= 2020–21 Al Ahly SC season =

Al Ahly
2020–21 season
- President: Mahmoud El Khatib
- Manager: Pitso Mosimane
- Stadium: Cairo International Stadium; Al Ahly WE Stadium
- Egyptian Premier League: 2nd
- Egypt Cup: Final
- Egyptian Super Cup: Runners-up
- CAF Champions League: Winners
- CAF Super Cup: Winners
- FIFA Club World Cup: Third place
- Top goalscorer: League: Mohamed Sherif (21); All: Mohamed Sherif (28)
- Biggest win: 4–0 vs Al Ittihad; 4–0 vs AS SONIDEP; 4–0 vs Smouha; 4–0 vs Ceramica Cleopatra
- Biggest defeat: 0–2 vs Bayern Munich
Home colours	Away colours	Third colours
- All statistics correct as of 25 September 2021.

The 2020–21 Al Ahly SC season was the 113th season in the football club's history and 62nd consecutive and overall season in the top flight of Egyptian football, the Egyptian Premier League. In addition to the domestic league, Al Ahly also are participating in this season's editions of the domestic cup, the Egypt Cup, the Egyptian Super Cup, and the first-tier African cup, the CAF Champions League. The season covers a period from 13 December 2020 to 30 July 2021.

== Kit information ==
Supplier: Umbro
Sponsors: WE, SAIB Bank, GLC Paints, Tiger Chips, Royal Dutch Shell

Home	Home alt.	Away	Third	Third alt.

== Players ==
=== Current squad ===
As of 20 December 2020

Squad no.	Name	Nationality	Position(s)	Date of birth	Signed from	Apps	Goals
Goalkeepers
1	Mohamed El Shenawy(captain)	(Egypt)	GK	18 December 1988 (age 37)	(Egypt) Petrojet	129	0
16	Ali Lotfi	(Egypt)	GK	14 October 1989 (age 37)	(Egypt) ENPPI	12	0
31	Mostafa Shobier	(Egypt)	GK	1 March 2000 (age 26)	Youth academy	1	0
Defenders
2	Mahmoud Wahid	(Egypt)	LB	19 June 1994 (age 32)	(Egypt) Misr Lel Makkasa	18	0
13	Badr Benoun	(Morocco)	CB	30 September 1993 (age 33)	(Morocco) Raja CA	2	0
4	Mahmoud Metwalli	(Egypt)	CB/DM	4 January 1993 (age 33)	(Egypt) Ismaily	17	0
5	Ramy Rabia	(Egypt)	CB/DM	20 May 1993 (age 33)	(Portugal) Sporting CP	168	11
6	Yasser Ibrahim	(Egypt)	CB	10 February 1993 (age 33)	(Egypt) Smouha	46	2
12	Ayman Ashraf	(Egypt)	CB/LB	9 April 1991 (age 35)	(Egypt) Smouha	143	4
3	Ahmed Ramadan	(Egypt)	RB/CB/DM	23 May 1997 (age 29)	(Egypt) Wadi Degla	3	0
20	Saad Samir	(Egypt)	CB	1 April 1989 (age 37)	Youth academy	195	13
21	Ali Maâloul	(Tunisia)	LB	3 January 1990 (age 36)	(Tunisia) CS Sfaxien	137	23
30	Mohamed Hany	(Egypt)	RB	25 January 1996 (age 30)	Youth academy	166	3
Midfielders
8	Hamdy Fathy	(Egypt)	DM/CB	1 October 1994 (age 32)	(Egypt) ENPPI	43	6
11	Walid Soliman (Vice-captain)	(Egypt)	AM/RW/LW	1 December 1984 (age 41)	(Egypt) ENPPI	260	62
15	Aliou Dieng	(Mali)	DM	16 October 1997 (age 29)	(Algeria) MC Alger	42	2
17	Amr El Solia	(Egypt)	CM/DM	2 April 1990 (age 36)	(United Arab Emirates) Al Shaab	184	19
19	Afsha	(Egypt)	AM/CM	5 March 1996 (age 30)	(Egypt) Pyramids	46	9
23	Nasser Maher	(Egypt)	AM/CM	8 February 1997 (age 29)	Youth Academy	39	3
24	Karim Walid	(Egypt)	CM/RB	8 August 1997 (age 29)	Youth academy	67	7
25	Akram Tawfik	(Egypt)	DM/CM/RB	8 November 1997 (age 29)	(Egypt) ENPPI	21	0
Forwards
7	Kahraba	(Egypt)	LW/ST	13 April 1994 (age 32)	(Portugal) C.D. Aves	25	7
9	Marwan Mohsen	(Egypt)	ST	26 February 1989 (age 37)	(Egypt) Ismaily	88	22
10	Mohamed Sherif	(Egypt)	ST/RW/LW	4 February 1996 (age 30)	(Egypt) Wadi Degla	13	4
14	Hussein El Shahat	(Egypt)	RW/AM/RB	21 June 1992 (age 34)	(United Arab Emirates) Al Ain	62	14
18	Salah Mohsen	(Egypt)	ST/LW/RW	1 September 1998 (age 28)	(Egypt) ENPPI	35	8
26	Walter Bwalya	(Democratic Republic of the Congo)	ST	5 May 1995 (age 31)	(Egypt) El Gouna	0	0
27	Taher Mohamed	(Egypt)	ST/LW	3 March 1997 (age 29)	(Egypt) Al Mokawloon	3	0
28	Junior Ajayi	(Nigeria)	LW/ST	29 January 1996 (age 30)	(Tunisia) CS Sfaxien	140	39

=== Youth Academy ===
Note: Flags indicate national team as defined under FIFA eligibility rules; some limited exceptions apply. Players may hold more than one non-FIFA nationality.

No.	Pos.	Nation	Player
33	DF	EGY	Faress Mohamed
34	DF	EGY	Mohamed Maghrabi
35	DF	EGY	Abdel Rahman Ashraf

No.	Pos.	Nation	Player
36	MF	EGY	Ahmed Nabil Koka
37	GK	EGY	Hamza Alaa

== Transfers ==
=== Transfers in ===
#	Position	Player	Transferred from	Fee	Date	Source
22	FW	(Egypt) Ahmed Yasser Rayyan	(Egypt) El Gouna	End of loan	31 October 2020	
25	MF	(Egypt) Akram Tawfik	(Egypt) El Gouna	End of loan	31 October 2020	
23	MF	(Egypt) Nasser Maher	(Egypt) Smouha	End of loan	31 October 2020	
10	MF	(Egypt) Mohamed Sherif	(Egypt) Enppi	End of loan	31 October 2020	
18	MF	(Egypt) Salah Mohsen	(Egypt) Smouha	End of loan	31 October 2020	
27	FW	(Egypt) Taher Mohamed	(Egypt) Al Mokawloon Al Arab	E£20m	9 July 2020	
13	DF	(Morocco) Badr Benoun	(Morocco) Raja Casablanca	E£31m	11 November 2020	
3	MF	(Egypt) Ahmed Ramadan Beckham	(Egypt) Wadi Degla SC	E£12m	23 November 2020	
26	ST	(Democratic Republic of the Congo) Walter Bwalya	(Egypt) El Gouna	E£28m	1 January 2021	

=== Transfers out ===
Position	Player	Transferred to	Fee	Date	Source
FW	(Egypt) Ramadan Sobhi	(England) Huddersfield	End of loan	30 June 2020	
GK	(Egypt) Sherif Ekramy	(Egypt) Pyramids	Released	26 September 2020	
DF	(Egypt) Hussein El Sayed	(Egypt) Tala'ea El Gaish	Undisclosed	15 October 2020	
MF	(Egypt) Hossam Ashour	(Egypt) Al Ittihad	Released	25 October 2020	
DF	(Egypt) Ahmed Fathy	(Egypt) Pyramids	Free transfer	31 October 2020	
DF	(Egypt) Basem Ali	(Egypt) Al Mokawloon	Free transfer	30 November 2020	
MF	(Egypt) Saleh Gomaa	(Egypt) Ceramica Cleopatra	Free transfer	3 December 2020	
MF	(Egypt) Ahmed El Sheikh	(Egypt) Pyramids	Free transfer	7 December 2020	
MF	(Angola) Geraldo	(Turkey) Ankaragücü	Released	29 January 2021	

==== Loans out ====
Position	Player	Loaned to	Date	Loan expires	Source
FW	(Egypt) Amr Gamal	(Egypt) Tala'ea El Gaish	9 August 2019	30 June 2021	
DF	(Egypt) Ahmed Alaa	(Egypt) Tala'ea El Gaish	9 August 2019	30 June 2021	
DF	(Egypt) Mohamed Abdelmonem	(Egypt) Smouha	23 January 2020	30 June 2021	
MF	(Egypt) Amar Hamdy	(Egypt) Al Ittihad	1 November 2020	30 June 2022	
DF	(Egypt) Mohamed Fakhri	National Bank of Egypt	12 November 2020	30 June 2021	
MF	(Egypt) Shady Radwan	National Bank of Egypt	16 November 2020	30 June 2021	
DF	(Egypt) Mahmoud El Gazzar	(Egypt) El Gouna	30 November 2020	30 June 2021	
MF	(Egypt) Arabi Badr	(Egypt) El Gouna	1 January 2020	30 June 2021	
FW	(Egypt) Ahmed Yasser Rayan	(Egypt) Ceramica Cleopatra	10 January 2020	30 June 2021	
FW	(Senegal) Aliou Badji	(Turkey) Ankaragücü	21 January 2020	30 June 2021	
DF	(Egypt) Mohamed Shokry	(Egypt) Smouha	28 January 2021	30 June 2022	

== Competitions ==
Win Draw Loss

=== Overview ===
Competition	First match	Last match	Starting round	Final position	Record							
Competition	First match	Last match	Starting round	Final position	Pld	W	D	L	GF	GA	GD	Win %
Egyptian Premier League	11 December 2020	27 August 2021	Matchday 1	2nd	34	22	10	2	72	29	+43	64.71
Egypt Cup	14 April 2021		Round of 32		3	3	0	0	5	2	+3	100.00
Egyptian Super Cup	21 September 2021		Final	Runners-up	1	0	0	1	0	0	+0	0.00
CAF Champions League	22 December 2020	17 July 2021	Group stage	Winners	13	9	3	1	26	6	+20	69.23
CAF Super Cup	28 May 2021		Final	Winners	1	1	0	0	2	0	+2	100.00
FIFA Club World Cup	4 February 2021	11 February 2021	Second round	Third place	3	2	0	1	1	2	−1	66.67
Total					55	37	13	5	106	39	+67	67.27

Last updated: 27 September 2021
Source: Competitions

=== Egyptian Premier League ===
==== League table ====
Pos	Team	Pld	W	D	L	GF	GA	GD	Pts	Qualification or relegation
1	Zamalek (Note: The 2020–21 Egyptian Premier League was not finished by the CAF deadline. As a result, the Egyptian Football Association announced that Zamalek and Al Ahly, who were at first and second place after 29 rounds respectively, will represent Egypt in the 2021–22 CAF Champions League. Meanwhile, Al Masry and Pyramids FC, who were at third and fourth place after 29 rounds respectively, will represent Egypt in the 2021–22 CAF Confederation Cup.) (C)	34	24	8	2	61	21	+40	80	Qualification for the Champions League
2	Al Ahly	34	22	10	2	72	29	+43	76	Qualification for the Champions League
3	Pyramids	34	13	16	5	51	37	+14	55	Qualification for the Confederation Cup
4	Smouha	34	12	18	4	54	41	+13	54	
5	Al Masry	34	13	11	10	44	38	+6	50	Qualification for the Confederation Cup

Source: Soccerway
Rules for classification: 1) Points; 2) Head-to-Head points; 3) Head-to-Head goal difference; 4) Head-to-Head goals scored; 5) Head-to-Head away goals scored; 6) Goal difference; 7) Goals scored.
(Note: Head-to-head record is used only after all the matches between the teams in question have been played).
(C) Champions

==== Results summary ====
Overall								Home						Away					
Pld	W	D	L	GF	GA	GD	Pts	W	D	L	GF	GA	GD	W	D	L	GF	GA	GD
34	22	10	2	72	29	+43	76	10	6	1	38	16	+22	12	4	1	34	13	+21

Source: Soccerway

==== Results by round ====
Round	1	2	3	4	5	6	7	8	9	10	11	12	13	14	15	16	17	18	19	20	21	22	23	24	25	26	27	28	29	30	31	32	33	34
Ground	H	H	H	A	H	A	H	A	H	A	H	A	A	H	A	H	A	A	A	A	H	A	H	A	H	A	H	A	H	H	A	H	A	H
Result	W	W	W	W	D	W	W	D	W	D	L	W	W	W	W	D	W	W	L	W	D	W	W	W	D	W	D	W	D	W	D	W	D	W
Position	1	1	1	1	1	1	1	2	1	2	2	2	2	2	2	2	2	2	2	2	2	1	1	2	2	2	3	2	2	2	2	2	2	2

Source: Soccerway
A = Away; H = Home; W = Win; D = Draw; L = Loss

==== Matches ====
The fixtures for the 2020–21 season were announced on 23 November 2020.

13 December 2020 1	Al Ahly	3–1	Misr Lel Makkasa	Al Salam City, Cairo
19:30 CAT (UTC+2)	Maâloul 5' (pen.); Kahraba 65'; El Solia 87'	Report	Mar. Hamdy 41'; Mody (yellow card) 90+6'	Stadium: Al Salam Stadium; Referee: Ibrahim Nour El Din

18 December 2020 2	Al Ahly	3–0	Ghazl El Mahalla	Al Salam City, Cairo
19:30 CAT (UTC+2)	Sherif 49', 80'; Kahraba 69'	Report	Rashwan (yellow card) 25'	Stadium: Al Salam Stadium; Referee: Tarek Magdy

28 December 2020 3	Al Ahly	4–0	Al Ittihad	Al Salam City, Cairo
19:30 CAT (UTC+2)	Kahraba 17'; Maâloul (yellow card) 45+4'; El Shahat 48'; Sherif 60'; Tawfik 85'; Hany (yellow card) 87'	Report	Yehia (yellow card) 23'	Stadium: Al Salam Stadium; Referee: Gehad Grisha
Note: Postponed from 23 December 2020.

1 January 2021 5	Al Ahly	0–0	Wadi Degla	Al Salam City, Cairo
19:30 CAT (UTC+2)	Dieng (yellow card) 64'	Report	Magdy (yellow card) 63'	Stadium: Al Salam Stadium; Referee: Ahmed El Ghandour

8 January 2021 6	Ceramica Cleopatra	0–2	Al Ahly	Suez City, Suez
19:30 CAT (UTC+2)	Mohsen (yellow card) 78'	Report	El Shenawy (yellow card) 72'; Kahraba 79'; Soliman 90+6'	Stadium: Suez Stadium; Referee: Mohamed Youssef

12 January 2021 7	Al Ahly	4–1	El Entag El Harby	Al Salam City, Cairo
19:30 CAT (UTC+2)	Maâloul 48'; El Shahat 69'; Soliman 77', 86'	Report	Morsy (yellow card) 66', (goal) 84'	Stadium: Al Salam Stadium; Referee: Mohamed Adel

17 January 2021 8	National Bank of Egypt	0–0	Al Ahly	El Max, Alexandria
17:00 CAT (UTC+2)	M. Magdy (yellow card) 84'	Report	Fathy (yellow card) 63'	Stadium: Haras El Hodoud Stadium; Referee: Mohamed Salama

21 January 2021 9	Al Ahly	3–2	Al Mokawloon Al Arab	Al Salam City, Cairo
17:00 CAT (UTC+2)	Ibrahim (yellow card) 8'; Taher 60'; Fathy (yellow card) 67'; Sherif 70', (yellow card) 82'; El Shahat (yellow card) 75'; Magdy 80'; El Solia (yellow card) 90'	Report	Dawouda (yellow card) 36'; Ashraf 38' (o.g.); Jaziri 44'; Hamdy (yellow card) 62'	Stadium: Al Salam Stadium; Referee: Mahmoud Nagy

26 January 2021 10	Pyramids	0–0	Al Ahly	New Cairo, Cairo
19:30 CAT (UTC+2)	Samy (yellow card) 26'	Report	Ramadan (yellow card) 22'; El Shahat (yellow card) 52'	Stadium: 30 June Stadium; Referee: Gehad Grisha

28 February 2021 14	Al Ahly	2–1	Tala'ea El Gaish	Al Salam City, Cairo
19:30 CAT (UTC+2)	Fathy (yellow card) 42'; Benoun (yellow card) 79'; Ajayi (yellow card) 25', (goal) 32', 90+1'	Report	Samir 26'; A. Gamal (yellow card) 36'	Stadium: Al Salam Stadium; Referee: Mahmoud El Banna
Note: Postponed from 18 February 2021.

10 March 2021 12	Ismaily	0–2	Al Ahly	Borg El Arab, Alexandria
19:30 CAT (UTC+2)	Sahraoui (yellow card) 42'; Hashem (yellow card) 55'	Report	El Shahat (yellow card) 32'; Benoun 72' (pen.); Ramadan (yellow card) 78'; S. Mohsen 88'; El Shenawy (yellow card) 90+4'	Stadium: Borg El Arab Stadium; Referee: Ibrahim Nour El Din
Note: Postponed from 8 February 2021.

18 April 2021 4	Zamalek	1–2	Al Ahly	Nasr City, Cairo
21:30 CAT (UTC+2)	Shikabala 31'; Alaa (penalty missed) 59', (yellow card) 64'; Bencharki (yellow card) 90+5'	Report	Sherif 21', 34'; Ramadan (yellow card) 79'	Stadium: Cairo International Stadium; Referee: Mahmoud El Banna
Note: Postponed from 28 December 2020.

21 April 2021 11	Al Ahly	1–2	Smouha	Al Salam City, Cairo
21:30 CAT (UTC+2)	El Shahat 33'; Ashraf (yellow card) 63'	Report	Abdel Halim 11'; Soliman (yellow card) 45+2'; El Tahir (yellow card) 77'; Hassan (yellow card) 73', (goal) 90+3'	Stadium: Al Salam Stadium; Referee: Mohamed El Sabahy
Note: Postponed from 4 February 2021.

24 April 2021 13	ENPPI	1–3	Al Ahly	New Cairo, Cairo
21:30 CAT (UTC+2)	Shalaby (yellow card) 36'; Sabry 55' (pen.)	Report	El Shahat 1'; Sherif 3'; El Solia 43'; Samir (yellow card) 54'	Stadium: Petro Sport Stadium; Referee: Mahmoud Ashour
Note: Postponed from 15 February 2021.

27 April 2021 15	Al Masry	1–2	Al Ahly	Shatby, Alexandria
21:30 CAT (UTC+2)	Gomaa (yellow card) 41'; Kamal 45+1'	Report	Sherif 11', 63'; Taher (yellow card) 87'	Stadium: Alexandria Stadium; Referee: Mohamed El Hanafy
Note: Postponed from 3 March 2021.

30 April 2021 16	Al Ahly	1–1	El Gouna	Al Salam City, Cairo
21:30 CAT (UTC+2)	Ramadan (yellow card) 53'; Taher 57'	Report	El Tayeb (yellow card) 52'; Aka (yellow card) 63'; Naguib 86'	Stadium: Al Salam Stadium; Referee: Mohamed Adel
Note: Postponed from 13 March 2021.

3 May 2021 19	Ghazl El Mahalla	1–0	Al Ahly	El Saba Banat, El Mahalla El Kubra
21:30 CAT (UTC+2)	Sayed 35'; Eid (yellow card) 45+3'; Fathallah (yellow card) 47'; Rashwan (yellow card) 59'; Moussa (yellow card) 79'; Yehia (yellow card) 80'; Shaaban (yellow card) 90+1'	Report	Bwalya (yellow card) 66'	Stadium: Ghazl El Mahalla Stadium; Referee: Mohamed Maarouf

6 May 2021 20	Al Ittihad	1–2	Al Ahly	Shatby, Alexandria
21:30 CAT (UTC+2)	Lowe (yellow card) 49'; Hamdy (yellow card) 52'; El Sabahy 90+2'	Report	Benoun 50' (pen.), (yellow card) 53'; Magdy 55'	Stadium: Alexandria Stadium; Referee: Mahmoud El Banna

10 May 2021 21	Al Ahly	1–1	Zamalek	Nasr City, Cairo
21:30 CAT (UTC+2)	Ashraf (yellow card) 43'; S. Mohsen 73'	Report	Sassi (yellow card) 22', (goal) 80'; Alaa (yellow card) 82'	Stadium: Cairo International Stadium; Referee: Amin Omar

1 July 2021 27	Al Ahly	2–2	Pyramids	Al Salam City, Cairo
21:00 CAT (UTC+2)	Fathy (yellow card) 21'; El Shahat 50'; Maâloul (penalty missed) 62'; Kahraba 81'	Report	Mansour (yellow card) 27'; Adel (yellow card) 39', (goal) 47'; Dunga (yellow card) 43' (red card) 45+4'; Fathy (yellow card) 63'; Traoré 90+3'	Stadium: Al Salam Stadium; Referee: Mohamed Adel
Note: Postponed from 26 June 2021.

4 July 2021 28	Smouha	0–4	Al Ahly	Shatby, Alexandria
21:00 CAT (UTC+2)	Homos (yellow card) 87'	Report	Sherif 40', 58'; El Shahat 42'; Maâloul 45' (pen.)	Stadium: Alexandria Stadium; Referee: Ibrahim Nour El Din

8 July 2021 26	Al Mokawloon Al Arab	0–2	Al Ahly	New Cairo, Cairo
21:00 CAT (UTC+2)		Report	S. Mohsen 77'; Sherif 90+4'	Stadium: Petro Sport Stadium; Referee: Mahmoud El Banna
Note: Postponed from 15 June 2021.

11 July 2021 18	Misr Lel Makkasa	1–4	Al Ahly	Attaka, Suez
19:00 CAT (UTC+2)	Mody 34' (pen.), (yellow card) 77'; Sobhy (yellow card) 55'	Report	Sherif 39', 62'; Desouki 75' (o.g.); El Solia (yellow card) 77'; Magdy 90+4'	Stadium: Egyptian Army Stadium; Referee: Mahmoud Ashour
Note: Postponed from 8 April 2021. Mohamed Desouki's own goal is also accredited as a goal for Mohamed Sherif.

22 July 2021 25	Al Ahly	1–1	National Bank of Egypt	Al Salam City, Cairo
19:00 CAT (UTC+2)	Magdy 48'; Ashraf (yellow card) 90+3'	Report	Farid (yellow card) 9'; Bambo 86'	Stadium: Al Salam Stadium; Referee: Abdel Aziz El Sayed
Note: Postponed from 29 May 2021.

25 July 2021 24	El Entag El Harby	2–3	Al Ahly	Al Salam City, Cairo
19:00 CAT (UTC+2)	Abou El Ezz 54'; El Shebini (yellow card) 63'; El Badry 64'; Salama (yellow card) 76'; Yehia (yellow card) 86'	Report	Hany (yellow card) 30'; Maâloul 38' (pen.); Ashraf (yellow card) 49'; Bwalya (yellow card) 73', (goal) 90+3'; El Shahat 85'; Sherif (yellow card) 90+6'	Stadium: Al Salam Stadium; Referee: Mohamed Maarouf
Note: Postponed from 26 May 2021.

29 July 2021 17	Aswan	1–3	Al Ahly	New Cairo, Cairo
19:00 CAT (UTC+2)	Osama (yellow card) 62'; Agbettor 85'	Report	Kahraba 22'; Ashraf (yellow card) 41'; Sherif 66'; Bwalya 90+5'	Stadium: Petro Sport Stadium; Referee: Mohamed Adel
Note: Postponed from 4 April 2021.

4 August 2021 22	Wadi Degla	1–2	Al Ahly	Al Salam City, Cairo
21:00 CAT (UTC+2)	Abdel Aati (yellow card) 66'; Sherif 67'; Walid (yellow card) 75'	Report	Kahraba 46'; Sherif 60'	Stadium: Al Salam Stadium; Referee: Ibrahim Nour El Din
Note: Postponed from 16 May 2021.

7 August 2021 23	Al Ahly	4–0	Ceramica Cleopatra	Al Salam City, Cairo
21:00 CAT (UTC+2)	Ibrahim 5'; Sherif 54' (pen.); Samy 72' (o.g.); Magdy 79'	Report	Amer (red card) 19'	Stadium: Al Salam Stadium; Referee: Amin Omar
Note: Postponed from 19 May 2021.

11 August 2021 29	Al Ahly	1–1	Ismaily	Shatby, Alexandria
21:00 CAT (UTC+2)	Sherif 22'; Ibrahim (yellow card) 76'; Taher (yellow card) 90+5'	Report	Dunga (yellow card) 25'; Ben Youssef 65'; Hassan (yellow card) 72'	Stadium: Alexandria Stadium; Referee: Mohamed El Hanafy

14 August 2021 30	Al Ahly	2–0	ENPPI	Al Salam City, Cairo
21:00 CAT (UTC+2)	Bwalya 3'; El Solia (yellow card) 16'; Magdy 28'	Report	Ebuka (yellow card) 14'; Sabry (yellow card) 67' (yellow-red card) 82'	Stadium: Al Salam Stadium; Referee: Mahmoud Ashour

17 August 2021 31	Tala'ea El Gaish	0–0	Al Ahly	Suez
19:00 CAT (UTC+2)	Gamal (yellow card) 25'; El Sisi (yellow card) 30'; Islam Gamal (yellow card) 73'; Mansi (yellow card) 80'	Report	Fathy (yellow card) 27'	Stadium: Egyptian Army Stadium; Referee: Ibrahim Nour El Din

20 August 2021 32	Al Ahly	4–2	Al Masry	Alexandria
CAT (UTC+2)	Mohsen 9' (yellow card) 73'; Taher 35' (yellow card) 60'; Tawfik (yellow card) 38'; El Shahat 45+2'; Kahraba 80'	Report	Gomaa (yellow card) 19'; Kamal 29'; Refaat 41' (pen.) (yellow card) 9'	Stadium: Alexandria Stadium; Referee: Mohamed Adel

23 August 2021 33	El Gouna	3–3	Al Ahly	El Gouna
CAT (UTC+2)	Naguib 7' (yellow card) 43'; Wael (yellow card) 58'; Shabrawy 86'; El Said 90+10' (pen.) (yellow card) 67'	Report	Hany (yellow card) 58'; Maâloul 61' (pen.); El Shahat 69'; Sherif 80'; Lotfi (yellow card) 90+4'	Stadium: Khaled Bichara Stadium; Referee: Amin Omar

27 August 2021 34	Al Ahly	2–1	Aswan	Cairo
CAT (UTC+2)	Sherif 69' (pen.); Mohsen 90+6'	Report	El Fil (yellow card) 62'; Dahroug (yellow card) 67'; Magdy 51'; Safi (yellow card) 73'	Stadium: Al Ahly WE Stadium; Referee: Said Hamza

=== Egypt Cup ===
14 April 2021 (Note: The Al Ahly v Al Nasr match, originally scheduled to be played on 19 February 2021, was postponed to avoid scheduling conflicts with Al Ahly's Champions League fixtures. The match was later rescheduled to be played on 14 April 2021.) Round of 32	Al Ahly	2–1	Al Nasr	Alexandria
21:30 CAT (UTC+2)	Soliman 45+2'; Bwalya 83'		El Saidy 54'	Stadium: Alexandria Stadium; Referee: Mohamed Abbas

25 September 2021 Round of 16	Al Ahly	1–0	ENPPI	Alexandria
19:00 CAT (UTC+2)	Mohsen 74'	Report		Stadium: Alexandria Stadium; Referee: Mahmoud El Banna

TBD (Note: The Al Ahly v Pyramids match, originally scheduled to be played on 29 September 2021, was postponed due to Egypt national team preparation for the 2022 FIFA World Cup qualifiers.) Quarter Final	Al Ahly	v	Pyramids
--:--

=== Egyptian Super Cup ===
21 September 2021	Al Ahly	0–0 (a.e.t.) (2–3 p)	Tala'ea El Gaish	Alexandria
19:00 CAT (UTC+2)		Report		Stadium: Borg El Arab Stadium; Referee: Mustapha Ghorbal (Algeria)
	Penalties
	Maâloul (penalty scored); Benoun (penalty missed); El Solia (penalty scored); Magdy (penalty missed); Sherif (penalty missed)		(penalty scored) El Sabahy; (penalty scored) Jouini; (penalty scored) El Sisi; (penalty missed) El Tayeb; (penalty missed) Magdy

=== CAF Super Cup ===
28 May 2021	Al Ahly (Egypt)	2–0	(Morocco) RS Berkane	Doha
18:00 CAT (UTC+2)	Sherif 57'; S. Mohsen 82'	Report		Stadium: Jassim bin Hamad Stadium; Attendance: 3,000

=== CAF Champions League ===
Al Ahly entered the competition for the 3rd consecutive time after winning the league and the CAF Champions League in the previous season. Al Ahly were ranked first in the CAF 5-year ranking prior to the start of the 2020–21 season. As a result, they entered the competition from the first round.

==== First round ====
Al Ahly were drawn against the winner of the tie involving AS SONIDEP from Niger and Mogadishu City from Somalia, which was won by the former.

23 December 2020 First leg	AS SONIDEP (Niger)	0–1	(Egypt) Al Ahly	Stade Général Seyni Kountché, Niamey
16:00 CAT (UTC+2)		Report	Dieng 33'	Referee: Daniel Laryea (Ghana)

5 January 2021 Second leg	Al Ahly (Egypt)	4–0 (5–0 agg.)	(Niger) AS SONIDEP	Al Salam Stadium, Cairo
19:00 UTC+2	Taher 13'; Soliman 37'; Benoun 67' (pen.); Kahraba 90+1'	Report		Referee: Yousri Bouali (Tunisia)

=== Group stage ===
The draw for the group stage was held on 8 January 2021. Al Ahly were drawn in Group A alongside AS Vita Club from the Democratic Republic of the Congo, Simba from Tanzania and Al Merrikh from Sudan.

==== Group A ====
Pos	Team	Pld	W	D	L	GF	GA	GD	Pts	Qualification	SIM	AHL	VIT	MER
1	(Tanzania) Simba	6	4	1	1	9	2	+7	13	Advance to knockout stage	—	1–0	4–1	3–0
2	(Egypt) Al Ahly	6	3	2	1	11	5	+6	11	Advance to knockout stage	1–0	—	2–2	3–0
3	(Democratic Republic of the Congo) AS Vita Club	6	2	1	3	10	12	−2	7		0–1	0–3	—	3–1
4	(Sudan) Al Merrikh	6	0	2	4	4	15	−11	2		0–0	2–2	1–4	—

Source: Soccerway

16 February 2021 (Note: The Al Ahly v Al Merrikh match, originally scheduled to be played on 13 February 2021, was rescheduled to be played on 16 February 2021 due to Al Ahly's participation in the 2020 FIFA Club World Cup in Qatar between 4 and 11 February 2021.) 1	Al Ahly (Egypt)	3–0	(Sudan) Al Merrikh	Cairo
21:00 CAT (UTC+2)	Magdy 57'; Kahraba 63'; Bwalya 71'	Report		Stadium: Cairo International Stadium; Referee: Janny Sikazwe (Zambia)

23 February 2021 2	Simba (Tanzania)	1–0	(Egypt) Al Ahly	Dar es Salaam
15:00 CAT (UTC+2)	Miquissone 31'	Report		Stadium: Benjamin Mkapa Stadium; Referee: Sidi Alioum (Cameroon)

5 March 2021 3	Al Ahly (Egypt)	2–2	(Democratic Republic of the Congo) AS Vita Club	Cairo
21:00 CAT (UTC+2)	Sherif 69'; Mohsen 71'	Report	Lilepo 41'; Tulengi 80' (pen.)	Stadium: Cairo International Stadium; Referee: Rédouane Jiyed (Morocco)

16 March 2021 4	AS Vita Club (Democratic Republic of the Congo)	0–3	(Egypt) Al Ahly	Kinshasa
15:00 CAT (UTC+2)		Report	Sherif 6'; Magdy 19'; Taher 78'	Stadium: Stade des Martyrs; Referee: Joshua Bondo (Botswana)

3 April 2021 5	Al Merrikh (Sudan)	2–2	(Egypt) Al Ahly	Omdurman
15:00 CAT (UTC+2)	Agab 26'; Bakhit 36'	Report	Benoun 81' (pen.); Ibrahim 90+4'	Stadium: Al Hilal Stadium; Referee: Bamlak Tessema Weyesa (Ethiopia)

9 April 2021 6	Al Ahly (Egypt)	1–0	(Tanzania) Simba	Cairo
21:00 CAT (UTC+2)	Sherif 32'	Report		Stadium: Al Salam Stadium; Referee: Mustapha Ghorbal (Algeria)

==== Quarter-finals ====
The draw for the quarter-finals was held on 30 April 2021. Al Ahly were drawn against Mamelodi Sundowns from South Africa.

15 May 2021 First leg	Al Ahly (Egypt)	2–0	(South Africa) Mamelodi Sundowns	Cairo
21:00 CAT (UTC+2)	Taher 23'; Mohsen 89'			Stadium: Al Ahly WE Stadium; Referee: Maguette N'Diaye (Senegal)

22 May 2021 Second leg	Mamelodi Sundowns (South Africa)	1–1 (1–3 agg.)	(Egypt) Al Ahly	Pretoria
15:00 CAT (UTC+2)	Lebusa 30'	Report	Ibrahim 11'	Stadium: Lucas Masterpieces Moripe Stadium; Referee: Janny Sikazwe (Zambia)

==== Semi-finals ====
19 June 2021 First leg	Espérance de Tunis (Tunisia)	0–1	(Egypt) Al Ahly	Radès
18:00 CAT (UTC+2)		Report	Sherif 67'	Stadium: Stade Olympique de Radès; Attendance: 6,000; Referee: Victor Gomes (South Africa)

26 June 2021 Second leg	Al Ahly (Egypt)	3–0 (4–0 agg.)	(Tunisia) Espérance de Tunis	Cairo
21:00 CAT (UTC+2)	Maaloul 38' (pen.); Sherif 56'; El Shahat 60'	Report		Stadium: Al Ahly WE Stadium; Referee: Sidi Alioum (Cameroon)

==== Final ====
17 July 2021	Kaizer Chiefs (South Africa)	0–3	(Egypt) Al Ahly	Casablanca
21:00 CAT (UTC+2)	Happy Mashiane (red card) 45+4'	Report	Sherif 53'; Magdy 64'; El Solia 74'	Stadium: Stade Mohammed V Referee: Pacifique Ndabihawenimana (Burundi)

=== FIFA Club World Cup ===
4 February 2021 Second round	Al-Duhail (Qatar)	0–1	(Egypt) Al Ahly	Al Rayyan, Qatar
20:30 AST (UTC+3)	Benatia (yellow card) 85'	Report	Fathi (yellow card) 27'; El Shahat 30'; Hany (yellow card) 89'	Stadium: Education City Stadium; Referee: Mario Escobar (Guatemala)

8 February 2021 Semi final	Al Ahly (Egypt)	0–2	(Germany) Bayern Munich	Al Rayyan, Qatar
21:00 AST (UTC+3)		Report	Lewandowski 17', 86'	Stadium: Ahmed bin Ali Stadium; Attendance: 7,982; Referee: Mohammed Abdulla Hassan Mohamed (United Arab Emirates)

11 February 2021 Match for third place	Al Ahly (Egypt)	0–0 (3–2 p)	(Brazil) Palmeiras	Al Rayyan, Qatar
18:00 AST (UTC+3)		Report	Weverton (yellow card) 27'; Willian (yellow card) 45+2'; Patrick (yellow card) 69'	Stadium: Education City Stadium; Attendance: 5,606; Referee: Maguette N'Diaye (Senegal)
	Penalties
	Benoun (penalty scored); El Solia (penalty missed); M. Mohsen (penalty missed); Hany (penalty scored); Ajayi (penalty scored)		(penalty missed) Rony; (penalty missed) Luiz Adriano; (penalty scored) Gustavo Scarpa; (penalty scored) Gómez; (penalty missed) Felipe Melo

== Statistics ==
=== Goalscorers ===
As of 27 September 2021

Rank	Position	Name	Premier League	Egypt Cup	Egyptian Super Cup	CAF Champions League	CAF Super Cup	Club World Cup	Total
1	FW	(Egypt) Mohamed Sherif	21	0	0	6	1	0	28
2	FW	(Egypt) Hussein El Shahat	9	0	0	1	0	1	11
3	FW	(Egypt) Kahraba	8	0	0	2	0	0	10
4	MF	(Egypt) Mohamed Magdy	6	0	0	3	0	0	9
5	FW	(Egypt) Salah Mohsen	5	1	0	1	1	0	8
6	FW	(Egypt) Taher Mohamed	3	0	0	3	0	0	6
6	DF	(Tunisia) Ali Maâloul	5	0	0	1	0	0	6
8	MF	(Egypt) Walid Soliman	3	1	0	1	0	0	5
8	FW	(Democratic Republic of the Congo) Walter Bwalya	3	1	0	1	0	0	5
10	DF	(Morocco) Badr Benoun	2	0	0	2	0	0	4
11	MF	(Egypt) Amr El Solia	2	0	0	1	0	0	3
11	DF	(Egypt) Yasser Ibrahim	1	0	0	2	0	0	3
13	FW	(Nigeria) Junior Ajayi	2	0	0	0	0	0	2
14	MF	(Mali) Aliou Dieng	-	0	0	1	0	0	1
14	MF	(Egypt) Akram Tawfik	1	0	0	0	0	0	1
14	FW	(Egypt) Marwan Mohsen	0	0	0	1	0	0	1
Own goal			1	0	0	0	0	0	1
Awarded goal			1	0	0	0	0	0	1
Total			72	3	0	26	2	1	105

=== Clean sheets ===
As of 27 September 2021

Rank	Name	Premier League	Egypt Cup	Egyptian Super Cup	CAF Champions League	CAF Super Cup	Club World Cup	Total
1	(Egypt) Mohamed El Shenawy	11	1	1	8	1	2	24
2	(Egypt) Ali Lotfi	1	0	0	1	0	0	2
3	(Egypt) Mostafa Shobair	0	0	0	0	0	0	0
Total		11	1	1	9	1	2	25
