= 2020–21 CAF Champions League knockout stage =

- Dates: 14 May – 17 July 2021

The 2020–21 CAF Champions League knockout stage started on 14 May with the quarter-finals and concluded on 17 July 2021 with the final to decide the champions of the 2020–21 CAF Champions League. A total of eight teams competed in the knockout stage.

Times are GMT as listed by CAF (local times, even if not different, are in parentheses).

== Round and draw dates ==
The schedule is as follows.

Round	Draw date	First leg	Second leg
Quarter-finals	30 April 2021	14–15 May 2021	21–22 May 2021
Semi-finals	30 April 2021	18–19 June 2021	25–26 June 2021
Final	30 April 2021	17 July 2021	

== Format ==
Each tie in the knockout stage, apart from the final, is played over two legs, with each team playing one leg at home. The team that scores more goals on aggregate over the two legs advances to the next round. If the aggregate score is level, the away goals rule is applied, i.e. the team that scores more goals away from home over the two legs advances. If away goals are also equal, then extra time is not played and the winners are decided by a penalty shoot-out. In the final, which is played as a single match, if the score is level at the end of normal time, extra time won't also be played and the winners will be decided by a penalty shoot-out. The mechanism of the draws for each round is as follows:

- In the draw for the quarter-finals, the four group winners are seeded, and the four group runners-up are unseeded. The seeded teams are drawn against the unseeded teams, with the seeded teams hosting the second leg. Teams from the same group cannot be drawn against each other, while teams from the same association can be drawn against each other.
- In the draws for semi-finals, there are no seedings, and teams from the same group or the same association can be drawn against each other. As the draws for the quarter-finals and semi-finals are held together before the quarter-finals are played, the identity of the quarter-final winners is not known at the time of the semi-final draw.

== Qualified teams ==
The knockout stage involves the 8 teams which qualify as winners and runners-up of each of the eight groups in the group stage.

Group	Winners	Runners-up
A	(Tanzania) Simba	(Egypt) Al Ahly
B	(South Africa) Mamelodi Sundowns	(Algeria) CR Belouizdad
C	(Morocco) Wydad AC	(South Africa) Kaizer Chiefs
D	(Tunisia) Espérance de Tunis	(Algeria) MC Alger

== Bracket ==
The bracket of the knockout stage is determined as follows:

Round	Matchups
Quarter-finals	(Group winners host second leg, matchups decided by draw, teams from same group cannot play each other): QF1; QF2; QF3; QF4
Semi-finals	(Matchups and order of legs decided by draw, between winners QF1, QF2, QF3, QF4): SF1; SF2
Final	Winners SF1 and SF2 will face each other to decide the champions

The bracket was decided after the draw for the knockout stage, which was held on 30 April 2021.

Quarter-finals
1	(Algeria) MC Alger	1	0	1
8	(Morocco) Wydad AC	1	1	2
4	(South Africa) Kaizer Chiefs	4	0	4
5	(Tanzania) Simba	0	3	3
2	(Algeria) CR Belouizdad	2	0	2 (2)
7	(Tunisia) Espérance de Tunis (p)	0	2	2 (3)
3	(Egypt) Al Ahly	2	1	3
6	(South Africa) Mamelodi Sundowns	0	1	1

Semi-finals
(Morocco) Wydad AC	0	0	0
(South Africa) Kaizer Chiefs	1	0	1
(Tunisia) Espérance de Tunis	0	0	0
(Egypt) Al Ahly	1	3	4

Final
(South Africa) Kaizer Chiefs	0
(Egypt) Al Ahly	3

== Quarter-finals ==
The draw for the quarter-finals was held on 30 April 2021.

=== Summary ===
The first legs were played on 14 and 15 May, and the second legs were played on 22 May 2021.

Team 1	Agg.	Team 2	1st leg	2nd leg
Al Ahly (Egypt)	3–1	(South Africa) Mamelodi Sundowns	2–0	1–1
MC Alger (Algeria)	1–2	(Morocco) Wydad AC	1–1	0–1
CR Belouizdad (Algeria)	2–2 (2–3 p)	(Tunisia) Espérance de Tunis	2–0	0–2
Kaizer Chiefs (South Africa)	4–3	(Tanzania) Simba	4–0	0–3

=== Matches ===
15 May 2021
19:00 (21:00 UTC+2)

Al Ahly (Egyptian Football Association)	2–0	(South African Football Association) Mamelodi Sundowns
Taher 23'; S. Mohsen 89'	Report

Al Salam Stadium, Cairo
Referee: Maguette N'Diaye (Senegal)
22 May 2021
13:00 (15:00 UTC+2)

Mamelodi Sundowns (South African Football Association)	1–1	(Egyptian Football Association) Al Ahly
Lebusa 30'	Report	Ibrahim 11'

Lucas Masterpieces Moripe Stadium, Pretoria
Referee: Janny Sikazwe (Zambia)

Al Ahly won 3–1 on aggregate.

14 May 2021
19:00 (20:00 UTC+1)

MC Alger (Algerian Football Federation)	1–1	(Royal Moroccan Football Federation) Wydad AC
Rebiaï 83'	Report	Jabrane 66' (pen.)

Stade du 5 Juillet, Algiers
Referee: Bamlak Tessema Weyesa (Ethiopia)
22 May 2021
16:00 (17:00 UTC+1)

Wydad AC (Royal Moroccan Football Federation)	1–0	(Algerian Football Federation) MC Alger
El Karti 90+2'	Report

Stade Mohammed V, Casablanca
Referee: Joshua Bondo (Botswana)

Wydad AC won 2–1 on aggregate.

15 May 2021
16:00 (17:00 UTC+1)

CR Belouizdad (Algerian Football Federation)	2–0	(Tunisian Football Federation) Espérance de Tunis
Draoui 35'; Sayoud 82'	Report

Stade du 5 Juillet, Algiers (Note: CR Belouizdad played their home matches at Stade du 5 Juillet, Algiers, instead of their regular home stadium Stade du 20 Août, Algiers, which did not meet CAF requirements.)
Referee: Jean-Jacques Ndala Ngambo (DR Congo)
22 May 2021
16:00 (17:00 UTC+1)

Espérance de Tunis (Tunisian Football Federation)	2–0	(Algerian Football Federation) CR Belouizdad
Benguit 68'; Ben Romdhane 87'	Report
Penalties
Ben Romdhane (penalty scored); Badri (penalty scored); Chaalali (penalty missed); Benguit (penalty scored)	3–2	(penalty missed) Sayoud; (penalty scored) Gasmi; (penalty scored) Draoui; (penalty missed) Djerrar; (penalty missed) Nessakh

Stade Hammadi Agrebi, Tunis
Referee: Bakary Gassama (Gambia)

2–2 on aggregate. Espérance de Tunis won 3–2 on penalties.

15 May 2021
16:00 (18:00 UTC+2)

Kaizer Chiefs (South African Football Association)	4–0	(Tanzania Football Federation) Simba
Mathoho 6'; Nurković 34', 57'; Castro 63'	Report

FNB Stadium, Johannesburg
Referee: Sidi Alioum (Cameroon)
22 May 2021
13:00 (16:00 UTC+3)

Simba (Tanzania Football Federation)	3–0	(South African Football Association) Kaizer Chiefs
Bocco 24', 56'; Chama 86'	Report

National Stadium, Dar es Salaam
Referee: Pacifique Ndabihawenimana (Burundi)

Kaizer Chiefs won 4–3 on aggregate.

== Semi-finals ==
The draw for the semi-finals was held on 30 April 2021 (after the quarter-finals draw).

=== Summary ===
The first legs were played on 19 June, and the second legs were played on 26 June 2021.

Team 1	Agg.	Team 2	1st leg	2nd leg
Wydad AC (Morocco)	0–1	(South Africa) Kaizer Chiefs	0–1	0–0
Espérance de Tunis (Tunisia)	0–4	(Egypt) Al Ahly	0–1	0–3

=== Matches ===
19 June 2021
19:00 (20:00 UTC+1)

Wydad AC (Royal Moroccan Football Federation)	0–1	(South African Football Association) Kaizer Chiefs
	Report	Nurković 34'

Stade Mohammed V, Casablanca
Referee: Maguette N'Diaye (Senegal)
26 June 2021
16:00 (18:00 UTC+2)

Kaizer Chiefs (South African Football Association)	0–0	(Royal Moroccan Football Federation) Wydad AC
	Report

FNB Stadium, Johannesburg
Referee: Jean-Jacques Ndala Ngambo (DR Congo)

Kaizer Chiefs won 1–0 on aggregate.

19 June 2021
17:00 (18:00 UTC+1) (Note: The Espérance de Tunis v Al Ahly match, originally scheduled to be played at 17:00 local time (UTC+1), was postponed for one hour due to clashes between Tunisian police officers and Espérance de Tunis fans.)

Espérance de Tunis (Tunisian Football Federation)	0–1	(Egyptian Football Association) Al Ahly
	Report	Sherif 67'

Stade Hammadi Agrebi, Tunis
Attendance: 5,000
Referee: Victor Gomes (South Africa)
26 June 2021
19:00 (21:00 UTC+2)

Al Ahly (Egyptian Football Association)	3–0	(Tunisian Football Federation) Espérance de Tunis
Maâloul 38' (pen.); Sherif 56'; El Shahat 60'	Report

Al Salam Stadium, Cairo
Referee: Sidi Alioum (Cameroon)

Al Ahly won 4–0 on aggregate.

== Final ==
The final will be played on 17 July 2021 at Stade Mohammed V, Casablanca.

17 July 2021
19:00 (20:00 UTC+1)

Kaizer Chiefs (South Africa)	0–3	(Egypt) Al Ahly
	Report	Sherif 53'; Magdy 64'; El Solia 74'

Stade Mohammed V, Casablanca
Referee: Pacifique Ndabihawenimana (Burundi)
