= 2021 Egyptian Super Cup =

2020–21 Egyptian Super Cup
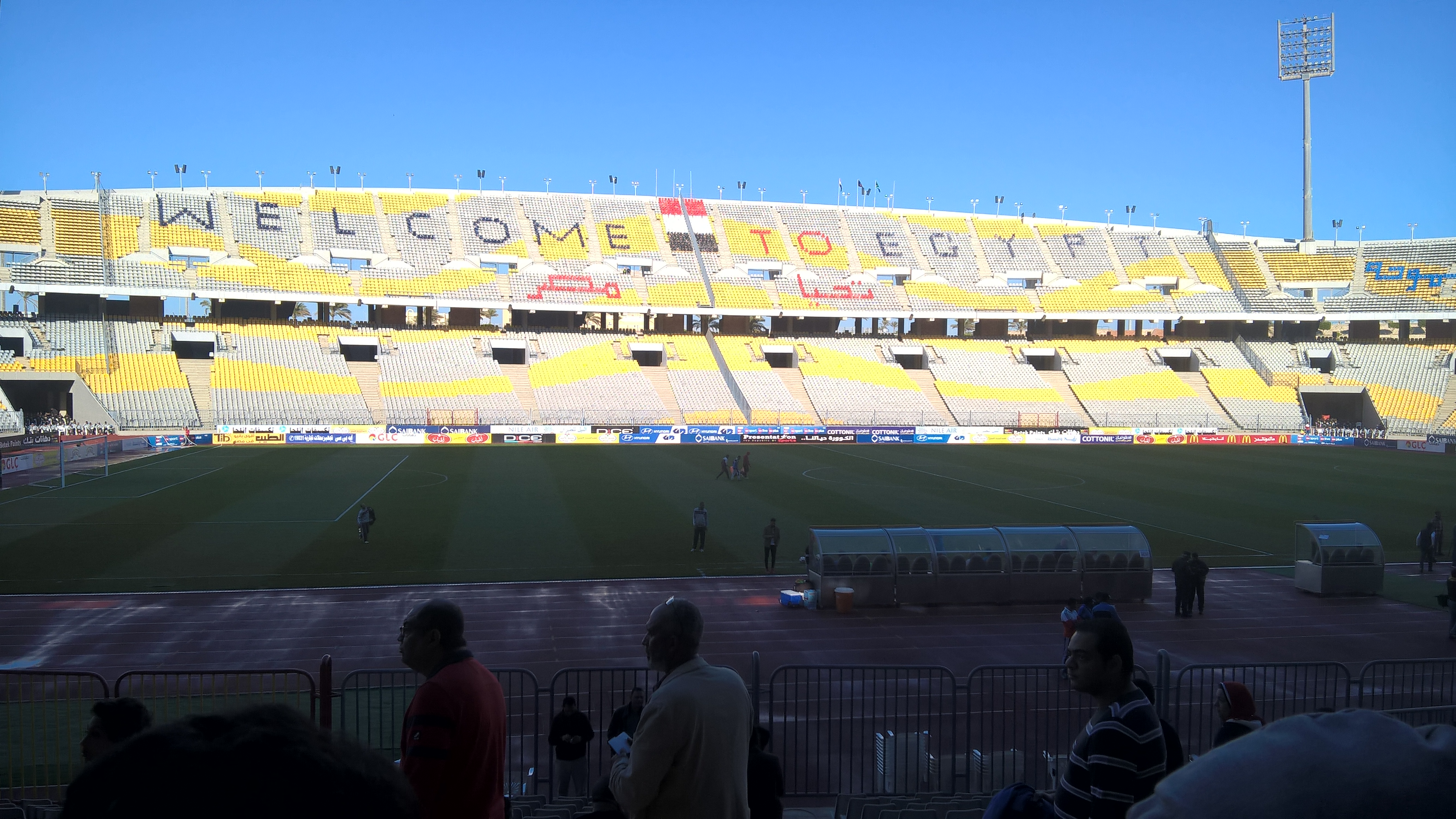
- Borg El Arab Stadium hosted the match
Al Ahly	Tala'ea El Gaish
0	0
- After extra time Tala'ea El Gaish won 3–2 on penalties
- Date: 21 September 2021
- Venue: Borg El Arab Stadium, Alexandria
- Referee: Mustapha Ghorbal (Algeria)
- Weather: Fair; 26 °C (79 °F); 78% humidity

The 2020-21 Egyptian Super Cup (also known as the 2020–21 SAIB Egyptian Super Cup for sponsorship reasons) was the 18th Egyptian Super Cup, an annual football match played between the winners of the previous season's Egyptian Premier League and Egypt Cup. It was played at Borg El Arab Stadium in Alexandria, Egypt, on 21 September 2021, contested by Al Ahly and Tala'ea El Gaish.

Since Al Ahly won the treble in the previous season (league, cup and CAF Champions League), Tala'ea El Gaish were awarded a spot in this season's super cup as the 2019–20 Egypt Cup runners-up. This was the last edition where the cup runners-up participate in the super cup if one team won the double in the previous season. Starting from the 2021–22 edition, the league runners-up would participate instead.

Tala'ea El Gaish won the match 3–2 on penalties, after the original and extra time ended 0–0, winning their first-ever title in all professional competitions.

== Venue ==
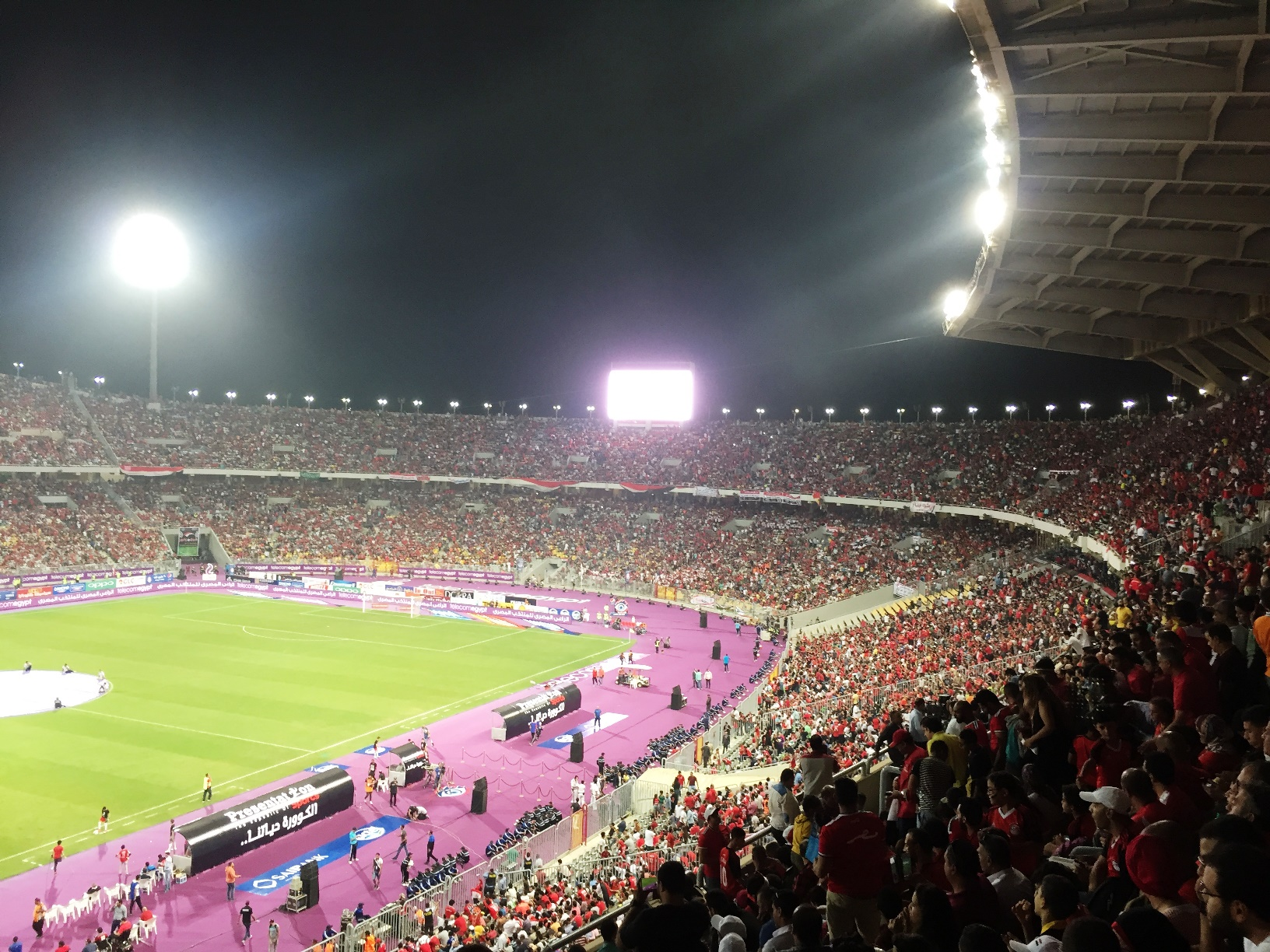
Borg El Arab Stadium during a match in the 2018 FIFA World Cup qualifiers.

The match was played at Borg El Arab Stadium in Alexandria, Egypt. It is one of the home venues for the Egyptian national team and occasionally hosts selected matches for different clubs in Egypt, including Al Ahly, Al Ittihad, Zamalek and others. It has an estimated capacity of 86,000 and is considered one of the most important sporting facilities in Egypt. It is the largest stadium in Egypt by seating capacity and the second largest stadium in Africa, after South Africa's FNB Stadium.

It was one of the eight venues that hosted the 2009 FIFA U-20 World Cup in the country, and one of the three venues that hosted the 2017 Arab Club Championship, hosting all Group C matches alongside one of the semi-final matches. The stadium also hosted one leg of the CAF Champions League finals in 2016, 2017 and 2018, and one leg of the 2019 CAF Confederation Cup Final.

The stadium hosted the super cup two times before. The first time was the 2012–13 edition when Al Ahly played against Egypt Cup winners ENPPI and secured a 2–1 win, while the second match was the 2018–19 edition that witnessed Al Ahly celebrating their 11th super cup title following their 3–2 victory over Egypt Cup winners Zamalek.

== Pre-game ==
=== Officials ===
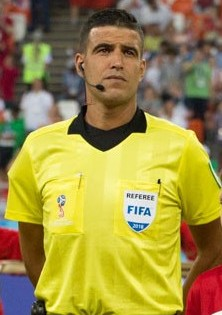
Mehdi Abid Charef was selected as the video assistant referee.

On 14 September 2021, it was reported that the match would be officiated by Algerian officials led by Mustapha Ghorbal. One day later, it was confirmed that Ghorbal had been chosen as the referee for the match. Ghorbal had been a FIFA referee since 2014 and officiated notable matches in the recent years, including the 2020 CAF Champions League Final between Al Ahly and Zamalek, and the 2021 CAF Super Cup between Al Ahly and RS Berkane. His compatriots Abdelhak Etchiali and Abbas Akram Zerhouni were chosen as the assistant referees, while Lyés Bekouassa was chosen as the fourth official. Mehdi Abid Charef was named the video assistant referee, and was assisted by Lahlou Benbraham.

=== Relocation to Borg El Arab ===
The match was initially planned to be played at the Cairo International Stadium in Cairo, Egypt, ahead of the 2020–21 season, but was postponed to a later date due to tight schedule for both teams. It was later rescheduled to be played on 1 July 2021, but was postponed once again after Al Ahly progressed to the final of 2020–21 CAF Champions League. Al Ahly went on to achieve their 10th Champions League title later that month after defeating Kaizer Chiefs of South Africa 3–0.

In early September 2021, the Egyptian Football Association announced the new date for the match, and moved it to Borg El Arab Stadium in Alexandria following the renovations made to the stadium.

=== 2021 summer signings participation ===
Despite the match was originally scheduled to be played before the start of the 2020–21 season, the Egyptian Football Association announced that both teams would be allowed to play their new signings who joined their respective clubs during the 2021 summer transfer window in the match.

== Match ==
21 September 2021
19:00 CAT (UTC+2)

Al Ahly	0–0 (a.e.t.)	Tala'ea El Gaish
	Report
Penalties
Maâloul (penalty scored); Benoun (penalty missed); El Solia (penalty scored); Magdy (penalty missed); Sherif (penalty missed)	2–3	(penalty scored) El Sabahy; (penalty scored) Jouini; (penalty scored) El Sisi; (penalty missed) El Tayeb; (penalty missed) Magdy

Borg El Arab Stadium, Alexandria
Referee: Mustapha Ghorbal (Algeria)

Al Ahly	Tala'ea El Gaish

GK	1	(Egypt) Mohamed El Shenawy (c)
LB	21	(Tunisia) Ali Maâloul
CB	6	(Egypt) Yasser Ibrahim
CB	12	(Egypt) Ayman Ashraf		(substituted off) 91'
RB	25	(Egypt) Akram Tawfik	(yellow card) 99'	(substituted off) 106'
CM	8	(Egypt) Hamdy Fathy		(substituted off) 120'
CM	17	(Egypt) Amr El Solia
AM	19	(Egypt) Mohamed Magdy
LW	27	(Egypt) Taher Mohamed		(substituted off) 61'
RW	14	(Egypt) Hussein El Shahat		(substituted off) 84'
CF	10	(Egypt) Mohamed Sherif
Substitutes:
GK	16	(Egypt) Ali Lotfi
DF	13	(Morocco) Badr Benoun		(substituted on) 120'
DF	20	(Egypt) Mahmoud Wahid
DF	30	(Egypt) Mohamed Hany		(substituted on) 106'
MF	15	(Mali) Aliou Dieng
MF	29	(Mozambique) Luís Miquissone		(substituted on) 61'
FW	7	(Egypt) Mahmoud Kahraba
FW	9	(Egypt) Hossam Hassan		(substituted on) 91'
FW	18	(Egypt) Salah Mohsen		(substituted on) 84'
Manager:
(South Africa) Pitso Mosimane

GK	18	(Egypt) Mohamed Bassam (c)
LB	21	(Egypt) Mohamed Nasef
CB	5	(Egypt) Ali El Fil	(substituted off) 67'
CB	6	(Egypt) Khaled Sotohi
RB	15	(Egypt) Hassan Magdy
CM	23	(Egypt) Abdel Rahman Osama	(substituted off) 57'
CM	22	(Egypt) Mohanad Lasheen
AM	8	(Egypt) Ahmed Abdel Rahman
LW	7	(Egypt) Amr El Sisi
RW	19	(Egypt) Ahmed Samir	(substituted off) 106'
CF	10	(Egypt) Mido Gaber	(substituted off) 82'
Substitutes:
GK	1	(Egypt) Mohamed Shaaban
DF	2	(Egypt) Ahmed Hany
DF	26	(Tunisia) Mohamed Ali Jouini	(substituted on) 82'
DF	31	(Egypt) Mohamed Samir
MF	17	(Egypt) Ali El Zahdi
MF	32	(Egypt) Mostafa El Zenary	(substituted on) 67'
MF	37	(Egypt) Mohamed Shehata
FW	11	(Egypt) Mohamed El Sabahy	(substituted on) 106'
FW	29	(Egypt) Karim El Tayeb	(substituted on) 57'
Manager:
(Egypt) Abdel Hamid Bassiouny

Assistant referees:
Abdelhak Etchiali (Algeria)
Abbas Akram Zerhouni (Algeria)
Fourth official:
Lyés Bekouassa (Algeria)
Video assistant referee:
Mehdi Abid Charef (Algeria)
Assistant video assistant referee:
Lahlou Benbraham (Algeria)

Match rules

- 90 minutes
- 30 minutes of extra time if necessary
- Penalty shoot-out if scores still level
- Nine named substitutes
- Maximum of five substitutions, with a sixth allowed in extra time (Note: Each team was only given three opportunities to make substitutions, with a fourth opportunity in extra time, excluding substitutions made at half-time, before the start of extra time and at half-time in extra time.)
