= 2020–21 CAF Champions League group stage =

- Dates: 12 February – 10 April 2021

Tournament statistics
- Matches played: 48
- Goals scored: 98 (2.04 per match)

The 2020–21 CAF Champions League group stage started on 12 February and ended on 10 April 2021. A total of 16 teams competed in the group stage to decide the eight places in the knockout stage of the 2020–21 CAF Champions League.

== Draw ==
The draw for the group stage was held on 8 January 2021, 12:30 GMT (14:30 local time, UTC+2), at the CAF headquarters in Cairo, Egypt. The 16 teams, all winners of the first round of qualifying, were drawn into four groups of four.

The teams were seeded by their performances in the CAF competitions for the previous five seasons (CAF 5-year ranking points shown in parentheses). Each group contained one team from each of Pot 1, Pot 2, Pot 3, and Pot 4, and each team was allocated to the positions in their group according to their pot.

Pot	Pot 1	Pot 2	Pot 3	Pot 4
Teams	(Egypt) Al Ahly (69 pts); (Morocco) Wydad AC (65 pts); (Tunisia) Espérance de Tunis (63 pts); (Democratic Republic of the Congo) TP Mazembe (55 pts)	(Egypt) Zamalek (54 pts); (South Africa) Mamelodi Sundowns (49 pts); (Guinea) Horoya (38 pts); (Democratic Republic of the Congo) AS Vita Club (23 pts)	(Sudan) Al Hilal (21.5 pts); (Angola) Petro de Luanda (12 pts); (Tanzania) Simba (12 pts); (Algeria) MC Alger (7 pts)	(Sudan) Al Merrikh (4 pts); (Algeria) CR Belouizdad; (Senegal) Teungueth; (South Africa) Kaizer Chiefs

== Format ==
In each group, teams play against each other home-and-away in a round-robin format. The winners and runners-up of each group will advance to the quarter-finals of the knockout stage.

=== Tiebreakers ===
Teams are ranked according to points (3 points for a win, 1 point for a draw, 0 points for a loss). If tied on points, tiebreakers are applied in the following order (Regulations III. 20 & 21):

1. Points in head-to-head matches among tied teams;
2. Goal difference in head-to-head matches among tied teams;
3. Goals scored in head-to-head matches among tied teams;
4. Away goals scored in head-to-head matches among tied teams;
5. If more than two teams are tied, and after applying all head-to-head criteria above, a subset of teams are still tied, all head-to-head criteria above are reapplied exclusively to this subset of teams;
6. Goal difference in all group matches;
7. Goals scored in all group matches;
8. Away goals scored in all group matches;
9. Drawing of lots.

== Schedule ==
The schedule of each matchday is as follows (matches scheduled in midweek in italics). Kick-off times are fixed at 13:00 (Saturdays only), 16:00 and 19:00 GMT.

Matchday	Dates	Matches
Matchday 1	12–13 February 2021	Team 1 vs. Team 4, Team 2 vs. Team 3
Matchday 2	23–24 February 2021	Team 3 vs. Team 1, Team 4 vs. Team 2
Matchday 3	5–6 March 2021	Team 4 vs. Team 3, Team 1 vs. Team 2
Matchday 4	16–17 March 2021	Team 3 vs. Team 4, Team 2 vs. Team 1
Matchday 5	2–3 April 2021	Team 4 vs. Team 1, Team 3 vs. Team 2
Matchday 6	9–10 April 2021	Team 1 vs. Team 3, Team 2 vs. Team 4

== Groups ==
=== Group A ===
Pos	Team	Pld	W	D	L	GF	GA	GD	Pts	Qualification	SIM	AHL	VIT	MER
1	(Tanzania) Simba	6	4	1	1	9	2	+7	13	Advance to knockout stage	—	1–0	4–1	3–0
2	(Egypt) Al Ahly	6	3	2	1	11	5	+6	11	Advance to knockout stage	1–0	—	2–2	3–0
3	(Democratic Republic of the Congo) AS Vita Club	6	2	1	3	10	12	−2	7		0–1	0–3	—	3–1
4	(Sudan) Al Merrikh	6	0	2	4	4	15	−11	2		0–0	2–2	1–4	—

Source: Soccerway
Rules for classification: Group stage tiebreakers
12 February 2021
19:00 (20:00 UTC+1)

AS Vita Club (Democratic Republic of the Congo)	0–1	(Tanzania) Simba
	Report	Mugalu 61' (pen.)

Stade des Martyrs, Kinshasa
Referee: Bakary Gassama (Gambia)
16 February 2021 (Note: The Al Ahly v Al Merrikh match, originally scheduled to be played on 13 February 2021, was rescheduled to be played on 16 February 2021 due to Al Ahly's participation in the 2020 FIFA Club World Cup in Qatar between 4 and 11 February 2021.)
19:00 (21:00 UTC+2)

Al Ahly (Egypt)	3–0	(Sudan) Al Merrikh
Magdy 57'; Kahraba 63'; Bwalya 71'	Report

Cairo International Stadium, Cairo
Referee: Janny Sikazwe (Zambia)

23 February 2021
13:00 (15:00 UTC+2)

Al Merrikh (Sudan)	1–4	(Democratic Republic of the Congo) AS Vita Club
Saadeldin 8'	Report	Mukokiani 28', 83'; Shabani 37' (pen.); Masasi 68'

Al Hilal Stadium, Omdurman (Note: Al Merrikh played their home matches at Al Hilal Stadium, Omdurman, instead of their regular home stadium Al Merrikh Stadium, Omdurman, which is undergoing renovation.)
Referee: Mustapha Ghorbal (Algeria)
23 February 2021
13:00 (16:00 UTC+3)

Simba (Tanzania)	1–0	(Egypt) Al Ahly
Miquissone 31'	Report

National Stadium, Dar es Salaam
Referee: Sidi Alioum (Cameroon)

6 March 2021
13:00 (15:00 UTC+2)

Al Merrikh (Sudan)	0–0	(Tanzania) Simba
	Report

Al Hilal Stadium, Omdurman
Referee: Bernard Camille (Seychelles)
6 March 2021
19:00 (21:00 UTC+2)

Al Ahly (Egypt)	2–2	(Democratic Republic of the Congo) AS Vita Club
Sherif 69'; M. Mohsen 71'	Report	Lilepo 41'; Tulengi 80' (pen.)

Cairo International Stadium, Cairo
Referee: Rédouane Jiyed (Morocco)

16 March 2021
13:00 (14:00 UTC+1)

AS Vita Club (Democratic Republic of the Congo)	0–3	(Egypt) Al Ahly
	Report	Sherif 6'; Magdy 19'; Taher 78'

Stade des Martyrs, Kinshasa
Referee: Joshua Bondo (Botswana)
16 March 2021
13:00 (16:00 UTC+3)

Simba (Tanzania)	3–0	(Sudan) Al Merrikh
Miquissone 18'; Husseini 39'; Mugalu 50'	Report

National Stadium, Dar es Salaam
Referee: Victor Gomes (South Africa)

3 April 2021
13:00 (15:00 UTC+2)

Al Merrikh (Sudan)	2–2	(Egypt) Al Ahly
Agab 26'; Bakhit 36'	Report	Benoun 81' (pen.); Ibrahim 90+4'

Al Hilal Stadium, Omdurman
Referee: Bamlak Tessema Weyesa (Ethiopia)
3 April 2021
13:00 (16:00 UTC+3)

Simba (Tanzania)	4–1	(Democratic Republic of the Congo) AS Vita Club
Miquissone 30'; Chama 45+1', 84'; Bwalya 66'	Report	Soze 32'

National Stadium, Dar es Salaam
Referee: Haythem Guirat (Tunisia)

9 April 2021
19:00 (20:00 UTC+1)

AS Vita Club (Democratic Republic of the Congo)	3–1	(Sudan) Al Merrikh
Mangoba 9'; Mayele 52'; Tulengi 80'	Report	Edjomariegwe 31'

Stade des Martyrs, Kinshasa
Referee: Abdel Aziz Mohamed Bouh (Mauritania)
9 April 2021
19:00 (21:00 UTC+2)

Al Ahly (Egypt)	1–0	(Tanzania) Simba
Sherif 32'	Report

Al Salam Stadium, Cairo
Referee: Mustapha Ghorbal (Algeria)

=== Group B ===
Pos	Team	Pld	W	D	L	GF	GA	GD	Pts	Qualification	MSD	CRB	TPM	HIL
1	(South Africa) Mamelodi Sundowns	6	4	1	1	10	4	+6	13	Advance to knockout stage	—	0–2	1–0	2–0
2	(Algeria) CR Belouizdad	6	2	3	1	6	6	0	9	Advance to knockout stage	1–5	—	2–0	1–1
3	(Democratic Republic of the Congo) TP Mazembe	6	1	2	3	3	6	−3	5		1–2	0–0	—	2–1
4	(Sudan) Al Hilal	6	0	4	2	2	5	−3	4		0–0	0–0	0–0	—

Source: Soccerway
Rules for classification: Group stage tiebreakers
13 February 2021
13:00 (15:00 UTC+2)

TP Mazembe (Democratic Republic of the Congo)	0–0	(Algeria) CR Belouizdad
	Report

Stade TP Mazembe, Lubumbashi
Referee: Eric Otogo-Castane (Gabon)
13 February 2021
16:00 (18:00 UTC+2)

Mamelodi Sundowns (South Africa)	2–0	(Sudan) Al Hilal
Lebusa 10'; Erasmus 90'	Report

Loftus Versfeld Stadium, Pretoria
Referee: Gehad Grisha (Egypt)

24 February 2021
13:00 (15:00 UTC+2)

Al Hilal (Sudan)	0–0	(Democratic Republic of the Congo) TP Mazembe
	Report

Al Hilal Stadium, Omdurman
Referee: Samir Guezzaz (Morocco)
28 February 2021 (Note: The CR Belouizdad v Mamelodi Sundowns match, originally scheduled to be played at Stade du 5 Juillet, Algiers (Note: CR Belouizdad played their home matches at Stade du 5 Juillet, Algiers, instead of their regular home stadium Stade du 20 Août, Algiers, which did not meet CAF requirements.) on 24 February 2021, was postponed due to restrictions related to the COVID-19 pandemic imposed by Algeria on travelers from South Africa out of concern of the variant 501.V2. The match was later rescheduled to be played outside Algeria on 28 February 2021 at National Stadium, Dar es Salaam (Tanzania).)
13:00 (16:00 UTC+3)

CR Belouizdad (Algeria)	1–5	(South Africa) Mamelodi Sundowns
Sayoud 44'	Report	Zwane 5' (pen.), 55'; Shalulile 8'; Maboe 75'; Erasmus 89'

National Stadium, Dar es Salaam (Tanzania)
Referee: Boubou Traoré (Mali)

5 March 2021
19:00 (20:00 UTC+1)

CR Belouizdad (Algeria)	1–1	(Sudan) Al Hilal
Koukpo 43'	Report	Abdel Rahman 3'

Stade du 5 Juillet, Algiers
Referee: Maguette N'Diaye (Senegal)
6 March 2021
13:00 (15:00 UTC+2)

TP Mazembe (Democratic Republic of the Congo)	1–2	(South Africa) Mamelodi Sundowns
Mputu 82'	Report	Shalulile 67'; Lakay 90'

Stade TP Mazembe, Lubumbashi
Referee: Sidi Alioum (Cameroon)

16 March 2021
13:00 (15:00 UTC+2)

Al Hilal (Sudan)	0–0	(Algeria) CR Belouizdad
	Report

Al Hilal Stadium, Omdurman
Referee: Mohamed Maarouf (Egypt)
16 March 2021
16:00 (18:00 UTC+2)

Mamelodi Sundowns (South Africa)	1–0	(Democratic Republic of the Congo) TP Mazembe
Maboe 28'	Report

Loftus Versfeld Stadium, Pretoria
Referee: Youssef Essrayri (Tunisia)

2 April 2021
13:00 (15:00 UTC+2)

Al Hilal (Sudan)	0–0	(South Africa) Mamelodi Sundowns
	Report

Al Hilal Stadium, Omdurman
Referee: Janny Sikazwe (Zambia)
2 April 2021
19:00 (20:00 UTC+1)

CR Belouizdad (Algeria)	2–0	(Democratic Republic of the Congo) TP Mazembe
Sayoud 84'; Bechou 86'	Report

Stade du 5 Juillet, Algiers
Referee: Mahmoud El Banna (Egypt)

9 April 2021
13:00 (15:00 UTC+2)

TP Mazembe (Democratic Republic of the Congo)	2–1	(Sudan) Al Hilal
Beya 18'; Tshibangu 76'	Report	Mugadam 2'

Stade TP Mazembe, Lubumbashi
Referee: Pacifique Ndabihawenimana (Burundi)
9 April 2021
13:00 (15:00 UTC+2)

Mamelodi Sundowns (South Africa)	0–2	(Algeria) CR Belouizdad
	Report	Sayoud 29'; Gasmi 45'

Loftus Versfeld Stadium, Pretoria
Referee: Joshua Bondo (Botswana)

=== Group C ===
Pos	Team	Pld	W	D	L	GF	GA	GD	Pts	Qualification	WAC	KZC	HOR	PET
1	(Morocco) Wydad AC	6	4	1	1	9	1	+8	13	Advance to knockout stage	—	4–0	2–0	2–0
2	(South Africa) Kaizer Chiefs	6	2	3	1	5	6	−1	9 (Note: Tied on head-to-head points (2), on head-to-head goal difference (0) and on head-to-head goals scored (2). Head-to-head away goals scored: Kaizer Chiefs 2, Horoya 0.)	Advance to knockout stage	1–0	—	0–0	2–0
3	(Guinea) Horoya	6	2	3	1	5	4	+1	9		0–0	2–2	—	2–0
4	(Angola) Petro de Luanda	6	0	1	5	0	8	−8	1		0–1	0–0	0–1	—

Source: Soccerway
Rules for classification: Group stage tiebreakers
Notes:
13 February 2021
16:00 (16:00 UTC+0)

Horoya (Guinea)	2–0	(Angola) Petro de Luanda
Nikièma 36' (pen.); Barry 85'	Report

General Lansana Conté Stadium, Conakry
Referee: Beida Dahane (Mauritania)

23 February 2021
13:00 (14:00 UTC+1)

Petro de Luanda (Angola)	0–1	(Morocco) Wydad AC
	Report	El Kaabi 71'

Estádio 11 de Novembro, Luanda
Referee: Jean-Jacques Ndala Ngambo (DR Congo)
23 February 2021
16:00 (18:00 UTC+2)

Kaizer Chiefs (South Africa)	0–0	(Guinea) Horoya
	Report

FNB Stadium, Johannesburg
Referee: Joshua Bondo (Botswana)

28 February 2021 (Note: The Wydad AC v Kaizer Chiefs match, originally scheduled to be played at Stade Mohammed V, Casablanca on 13 February 2021, was postponed due to restrictions related to the COVID-19 pandemic imposed by Morocco on travelers from South Africa out of concern of the variant 501.V2. The match was later rescheduled to be played outside Morocco on 28 February 2021 at Stade du 4 Août, Ouagadougou (Burkina Faso).)
16:00 (16:00 UTC+0)

Wydad AC (Morocco)	4–0	(South Africa) Kaizer Chiefs
Ounajem 7'; El Kaabi 44'; Msuva 86'; Jabrane 90+2' (pen.)	Report

Stade du 4 Août, Ouagadougou (Burkina Faso)
Referee: Sadok Selmi (Tunisia)

6 March 2021
16:00 (18:00 UTC+2)

Kaizer Chiefs (South Africa)	2–0	(Angola) Petro de Luanda
Mathoho 30'; Mashiane 79'	Report

FNB Stadium, Johannesburg
Referee: Bamlak Tessema Weyesa (Ethiopia)
6 March 2021
19:00 (20:00 UTC+1)

Wydad AC (Morocco)	2–0	(Guinea) Horoya
El Kaabi 19'; Msuva 90'	Report

Stade Mohammed V, Casablanca
Referee: Mehdi Abid Charef (Algeria)

16 March 2021
16:00 (16:00 UTC+0)

Horoya (Guinea)	0–0	(Morocco) Wydad AC
	Report

General Lansana Conté Stadium, Conakry
Referee: Daniel Laryea (Ghana)
16 March 2021
16:00 (17:00 UTC+1)

Petro de Luanda (Angola)	0–0	(South Africa) Kaizer Chiefs
	Report

Estádio 11 de Novembro, Luanda
Referee: Pacifique Ndabihawenimana (Burundi)

3 April 2021
16:00 (17:00 UTC+1)

Petro de Luanda (Angola)	0–1	(Guinea) Horoya
	Report	S. Camara 2'

Estádio 11 de Novembro, Luanda
Referee: Pierre Atcho (Gabon)
3 April 2021
16:00 (18:00 UTC+2)

Kaizer Chiefs (South Africa)	1–0	(Morocco) Wydad AC
Parker 48'	Report

FNB Stadium, Johannesburg
Referee: Ibrahim Nour El Din (Egypt)

10 April 2021
19:00 (19:00 UTC+0)

Horoya (Guinea)	2–2	(South Africa) Kaizer Chiefs
Barry 45+2'; S. Camara 69'	Report	Cardoso 67' (pen.); Billiat 76'

General Lansana Conté Stadium, Conakry
Referee: Bakary Gassama (Gambia)
10 April 2021
19:00 (20:00 UTC+1)

Wydad AC (Morocco)	2–0	(Angola) Petro de Luanda
El Karti 15'; Ounajem 22'	Report

Stade Mohammed V, Casablanca
Referee: Mutaz Ibrahim (Libya)

=== Group D ===
Pos	Team	Pld	W	D	L	GF	GA	GD	Pts	Qualification	EST	MCA	ZAM	TEU
1	(Tunisia) Espérance de Tunis	6	3	2	1	9	6	+3	11	Advance to knockout stage	—	1–1	3–1	2–1
2	(Algeria) MC Alger	6	2	3	1	4	4	0	9	Advance to knockout stage	1–1	—	0–2	1–0
3	(Egypt) Zamalek	6	2	2	2	7	5	+2	8		0–1	0–0	—	4–1
4	(Senegal) Teungueth	6	1	1	4	4	9	−5	4		2–1	0–1	0–0	—

Source: Soccerway
Rules for classification: Group stage tiebreakers
12 February 2021
19:00 (21:00 UTC+2)

Zamalek (Egypt)	0–0	(Algeria) MC Alger
	Report

Cairo International Stadium, Cairo
Referee: Bamlak Tessema Weyesa (Ethiopia)
13 February 2021
13:00 (14:00 UTC+1)

Espérance de Tunis (Tunisia)	2–1	(Senegal) Teungueth
Khenissi 45' (pen.); Khalid 73'	Report	Sillah 33'

Stade Olympique de Radès, Tunis
Referee: Peter Waweru (Kenya)

23 February 2021
16:00 (16:00 UTC+0)

Teungueth (Senegal)	0–0	(Egypt) Zamalek
	Report

Stade Lat-Dior, Thiès
Referee: Daniel Laryea (Ghana)
23 February 2021
19:00 (20:00 UTC+1)

MC Alger (Algeria)	1–1	(Tunisia) Espérance de Tunis
Bensaha 27'	Report	Benguit 60'

Stade du 5 Juillet, Algiers
Referee: Rédouane Jiyed (Morocco)

6 March 2021
16:00 (16:00 UTC+0)

Teungueth (Senegal)	0–1	(Algeria) MC Alger
	Report	Belkheir 14'

Stade Lat-Dior, Thiès
Referee: Beida Dahane (Mauritania)
6 March 2021
16:00 (17:00 UTC+1)

Espérance de Tunis (Tunisia)	3–1	(Egypt) Zamalek
Togui 26'; Ben Romdhane 45' (pen.), 53'	Report	Abou El Fotouh 39'

Stade Olympique de Radès, Tunis
Referee: Janny Sikazwe (Zambia)

16 March 2021
19:00 (20:00 UTC+1)

MC Alger (Algeria)	1–0	(Senegal) Teungueth
Benaldjia 25'	Report

Stade du 5 Juillet, Algiers
Referee: Boubou Traoré (Mali)
16 March 2021
19:00 (21:00 UTC+2)

Zamalek (Egypt)	0–1	(Tunisia) Espérance de Tunis
	Report	Elhouni 73'

Cairo International Stadium, Cairo
Referee: Jean-Jacques Ndala Ngambo (DR Congo)

3 April 2021
16:00 (16:00 UTC+0)

Teungueth (Senegal)	2–1	(Tunisia) Espérance de Tunis
Niang 38'; B. D. Diop 72'	Report	Ben Romdhane 28'

Stade Lat-Dior, Thiès
Referee: Blaise Yuven Ngwa (Cameroon)
3 April 2021
19:00 (20:00 UTC+1)

MC Alger (Algeria)	0–2	(Egypt) Zamalek
	Report	Obama 7'; Shikabala 33'

Stade du 5 Juillet, Algiers
Referee: Noureddine El Jaafari (Morocco)

10 April 2021
16:00 (17:00 UTC+1)

Espérance de Tunis (Tunisia)	1–1	(Algeria) MC Alger
Ben Khalifa 31'	Report	Belkheir 68'

Stade Olympique de Radès, Tunis
Referee: Victor Gomes (South Africa)
10 April 2021
16:00 (18:00 UTC+2)

Zamalek (Egypt)	4–1	(Senegal) Teungueth
Mah. Hamdy 16', 41'; Mar. Hamdy 25', 38'	Report	Sakho 48'

Cairo International Stadium, Cairo
Referee: Mahamadou Keita (Mali)
