= 2021 CAF Champions League final =

African football tournament final

- Event: 2020–21 CAF Champions League
Kaizer Chiefs	Al Ahly
(South Africa)	(Egypt)
0	3
- Date: 17 July 2021
- Venue: Stade Mohammed V, Casablanca, Morocco
- Man of the Match: Amr El Solia (Al Ahly)
- Referee: Pacifique Ndabihawenimana (Burundi)
- Weather: Fair; 25 °C (77 °F); 57% humidity

The 2021 CAF Champions League final was the final match of the 2020–21 CAF Champions League, the 57th season of Africa's premier club football tournament organised by CAF, and the 25th edition under the current CAF Champions League title. It was played at the Stade Mohammed V in Casablanca, Morocco on 17 July 2021.

Al Ahly defeated Kaizer Chiefs 3–0 to win a record-extending 10th CAF Champions League title. They also earned the right to play against Raja Casablanca, the winners of the 2020–21 CAF Confederation Cup, in the 2021–22 CAF Super Cup. Al Ahly also qualified for the 2021 FIFA Club World Cup in United Arab Emirates, entering from the second round.

== Teams ==
In the following table, finals until 1996 were in the African Cup of Champions Club era, since 1997 were in the CAF Champions League era.

Team	Zone	Previous finals appearances (bold indicates winners)
(South Africa) Kaizer Chiefs	COSAFA (Southern Africa)	None
(Egypt) Al Ahly	UNAF (North Africa)	13 (**1982**, 1983, **1987**, **2001**, **2005**, **2006**, 2007, **2008**, **2012**, **2013**, 2017, 2018, **2020**)

== Venue ==
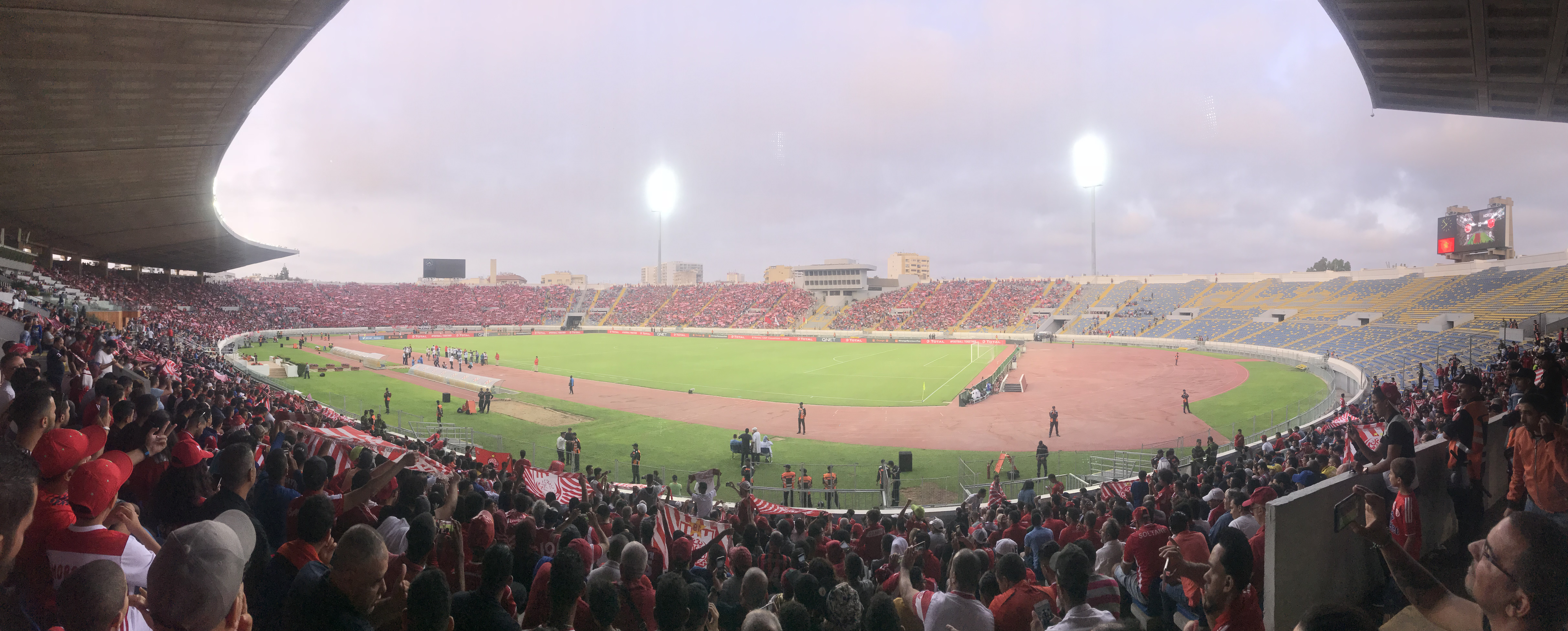
Stade Mohammed V in Casablanca, Morocco hosted the match.

For the second consecutive year, the final was played as a single match at a pre-selected venue by CAF instead of a two-legged fixtures format, which was being used in the competition since 1966.

On 16 May 2021, Stade Mohammed V in Casablanca, Morocco was chosen by a CAF Executive Committee to host the final during a meeting in Kigali, Rwanda.

== Road to the final ==
Note: In all results below, the score of the finalist is given first (H: home; A: away).

(South Africa) Kaizer Chiefs				Round	(Egypt) Al Ahly			
Opponent	Agg.	1st leg	2nd leg	Qualifying rounds	Opponent	Agg.	1st leg	2nd leg
(Cameroon) PWD Bamenda	1–0	1–0 (A)	0–0 (H)	Preliminary round	Bye			
(Angola) 1º de Agosto	1–0	0–0 (H)	1–0 (A)	First round	(Niger) AS SONIDEP	5–0	1–0 (A)	4–0 (H)
Opponent	Result			Group stage	Opponent	Result		
(Morocco) Wydad AC	0–4 (A)			Matchday 1	(Sudan) Al Merrikh	3–0 (H)		
(Guinea) Horoya	0–0 (H)			Matchday 2	(Tanzania) Simba	0–1 (A)		
(Angola) Petro de Luanda	2–0 (H)			Matchday 3	(Democratic Republic of the Congo) AS Vita Club	2–2 (H)		
(Angola) Petro de Luanda	0–0 (A)			Matchday 4	(Democratic Republic of the Congo) AS Vita Club	3–0 (A)		
(Morocco) Wydad AC	1–0 (H)			Matchday 5	(Sudan) Al Merrikh	2–2 (A)		
(Guinea) Horoya	2–2 (A)			Matchday 6	(Tanzania) Simba	1–0 (H)		
**Group C runners-up**: Pos / Team / Pld / Pts; 1 / (Morocco) Wydad AC / 6 / **13**; **2** / (South Africa) Kaizer Chiefs / **6** / **9**; 3 / (Guinea) Horoya / 6 / **9**; 4 / (Angola) Petro de Luanda / 6 / **1**; Source: Soccerway				Final standings	**Group A runners-up**: Pos / Team / Pld / Pts; 1 / (Tanzania) Simba / 6 / **13**; **2** / (Egypt) Al Ahly / **6** / **11**; 3 / (Democratic Republic of the Congo) AS Vita Club / 6 / **7**; 4 / (Sudan) Al Merrikh / 6 / **2**; Source: Soccerway			
Opponent	Agg.	1st leg	2nd leg	Knockout stage	Opponent	Agg.	1st leg	2nd leg
(Tanzania) Simba	4–3	4–0 (H)	0–3 (A)	Quarter-finals	(South Africa) Mamelodi Sundowns	3–1	2–0 (H)	1–1 (A)
(Morocco) Wydad AC	1–0	1–0 (A)	0–0 (H)	Semi-finals	(Tunisia) Espérance de Tunis	4–0	1–0 (A)	3–0 (H)

== Format ==
The final was played as a single match at a pre-selected venue, with the winner of semi-final 1 according to the knockout stage draw designated as the "home" team for administrative purposes. If scores were level after full time, extra time would not to be played and the winner would be decided by a penalty shoot-out (Regulations Article III. 28).

== Match ==
=== Details ===
17 July 2021
19:00 GMT
(20:00 UTC+1)

Kaizer Chiefs (South Africa)	0–3	(Egypt) Al Ahly
	Report	Sherif 53'; Magdy 64'; El Solia 74'

Stade Mohammed V, Casablanca
Referee: Pacifique Ndabihawenimana (Burundi)

**Kaizer Chiefs**	**Al Ahly**

GK	1	(Nigeria) Daniel Akpeyi
RB	2	(South Africa) Ramahlwe Mphahlele
CB	3	(South Africa) Eric Mathoho
CB	4	(South Africa) Daniel Cardoso
LB	23	(South Africa) Reeve Frosler
RM	12	(South Africa) Njabulo Blom		(substituted off) 59'
CM	14	(Zimbabwe) Willard Katsande		(substituted off) 76'
LM	25	(South Africa) Bernard Parker (c)	(yellow card) 9'
RF	15	(South Africa) Nkosingiphile Ngcobo		(substituted off) 46'
CF	9	(Serbia) Samir Nurković		(substituted off) 90+2'
LF	19	(South Africa) Happy Mashiane	(red card) 45+4'
Substitutes:
GK	26	(South Africa) Bruce Bvuma
DF	20	(South Africa) Yagan Sasman
DF	27	(South Africa) Siphosakhe Ntiya-Ntiya
DF	30	(South Africa) Siyabonga Ngezana
MF	5	(Kenya) Teddy Akumu		(substituted on) 59'
MF	22	(South Africa) Philani Zulu		(substituted on) 76'
FW	7	(Zambia) Lazarous Kambole		(substituted on) 90+2'
FW	8	(Colombia) Leonardo Castro
FW	11	(Zimbabwe) Khama Billiat		(substituted on) 46'
Manager:
(Scotland) Stuart Baxter

GK	1	(Egypt) Mohamed El Shenawy (c)
RB	25	(Egypt) Akram Tawfik
CB	3	(Morocco) Badr Benoun	(yellow card) 80'	(substituted off) 90'
CB	12	(Egypt) Ayman Ashraf	(yellow card) 21'	(substituted off) 46'
LB	21	(Tunisia) Ali Maâloul
CM	17	(Egypt) Amr El Solia
CM	8	(Egypt) Hamdy Fathy
RW	14	(Egypt) Hussein El Shahat	(yellow card) 90+2'
AM	19	(Egypt) Mohamed Magdy		(substituted off) 90'
LW	27	(Egypt) Taher Mohamed	(yellow card) 50'	(substituted off) 67'
CF	10	(Egypt) Mohamed Sherif		(substituted off) 90'
Substitutes:
GK	13	(Egypt) Ali Lotfi
DF	2	(Egypt) Mahmoud Wahid
DF	6	(Egypt) Yasser Ibrahim		(substituted on) 46'
DF	30	(Egypt) Mohamed Hany
MF	15	(Mali) Aliou Dieng	(yellow card) 86'	(substituted on) 67'
FW	7	(Egypt) Mahmoud Kahraba		(substituted on) 90'
FW	9	(Egypt) Marwan Mohsen
FW	18	(Egypt) Salah Mohsen		(substituted on) 90'
FW	28	(Nigeria) Junior Ajayi		(substituted on) 90'
Manager:
(South Africa) Pitso Mosimane

Man of the Match:
Mohamed Magdy
(Al Ahly)

Assistant referees:
Elvis Guy Noupue (Cameroon)
Dick Okello (Uganda)
Fourth official:
Eric Otogo-Castane (Gabon)
Video assistant referee:
Rédouane Jiyed (Morocco)
Assistant video assistant referees:
Zakaria Brinsi (Morocco)
Bouchra Karboubi (Morocco)

**Match rules**

- 90 minutes.
- Penalty shoot-out if scores level.
- Nine named substitutes, of which up to five may be used. (Note: Each team was only given three opportunities to make substitutions, excluding substitutions made at half-time.)

=== Statistics ===
First half
Statistic	Kaizer Chiefs	Al Ahly
Goals scored	0	0
Total shots	1	6
Shots on target	1	0
Saves	0	1
Ball possession	28%	72%
Corner kicks	3	2
Yellow cards	1	1
Red cards	1	0

Second half
Statistic	Kaizer Chiefs	Al Ahly
Goals scored	0	3
Total shots	2	10
Shots on target	0	4
Saves	1	0
Ball possession	31%	69%
Corner kicks	3	4
Yellow cards	0	4
Red cards	0	0

Overall
Statistic	Kaizer Chiefs	Al Ahly
Goals scored	0	3
Total shots	3	16
Shots on target	1	4
Saves	1	1
Ball possession	30%	70%
Corner kicks	6	6
Yellow cards	1	5
Red cards	1	0

== See also ==
- 2021 CAF Confederation Cup Final
- 2021–22 CAF Super Cup
