= 2025–26 Al-Ahly Benghazi season =

Al-Ahly Benghazi
2025–26 season
- Manager: Tarek Mostafa (until 29 December); Reda Hakam (from 4 January)
- Stadium: Benina Martyrs Stadium
- Libyan Premier League: 3rd
- Championship round: 3rd
- Libyan Cup: Runners-up

The 2025–26 season is the 79th year in the history of Al Ahly Sports Club, with the team participating in the Libyan Premier League and the Libyan Cup.

== Transfers ==
=== In ===
Pos.	Player	Transferred from	Fee	Date	Source
MF	(Mozambique) Luís Miquissone	(Mozambique) UD Songo		23 January 2026	

== Pre-season and friendlies ==
29 March 2026 Friendly	Al-Ahly Benghazi	3–2	Al Tahaddy	Benghazi
				Stadium: Benina Martyrs Stadium

31 March 2026 Friendly	Al-Ahly Benghazi	0–0	Al-Ahly Tripoli	Benghazi
				Stadium: Benghazi International Stadium

== Competitions ==
=== Overall record ===
Competition	First match	Last match	Starting round	Final position	Record							
Competition	First match	Last match	Starting round	Final position	Pld	W	D	L	GF	GA	GD	Win %
Libyan Premier League Preliminary stage	18 December 2025	24 April 2026	Matchday 1	3rd	16	9	6	1	23	6	+17	56.25
Libyan Premier League Championship round	7 May 2026	23 May 2026	Matchday 1	3rd	5	3	0	2	9	6	+3	60.00
Libyan Cup	14 February 2026	9 June 2026		Runners-up	5	3	1	1	6	2	+4	60.00
Total					26	15	7	4	38	14	+24	57.69

Source: Competitions

=== Libyan Premier League ===
==== Preliminary stage ====
Round	1	2	3	4	5	6	7	8	9	10	11	12	13	14	15	16
Ground	A	H	A	H	A	H	A	H	A	H	A	H	H	A	H	A
Result	D	D	W	W	D	W	L	W	W	D	W	D	W	W	D	W
Position																

A = Away; H = Home; W = Win; D = Draw; L = Loss

18 December 2025 1	Al-Anwar	2–2	Al-Ahly Benghazi

25 December 2025 2	Al-Ahly Benghazi	0–0	Al-Hilal Benghazi

31 December 2025 3	Al Ta'awon	0–1	Al-Ahly Benghazi

6 January 2026 4	Al-Ahly Benghazi	3–0	Al-Suqoor

14 January 2026 5	Darnes	0–0	Al-Ahly Benghazi

27 January 2026 6	Al-Ahly Benghazi	2–0	Al-Borouq

2 February 2026 7	Al Ittihad Al Asskary	1–0	Al-Ahly Benghazi

8 February 2026 8	Al Ittihad Al Asskary	3–0	Al Sadaqa

26 February 2026 9	Al-Hilal Benghazi	1–2	Al-Ahly Benghazi

4 March 2026 10	Al-Ahly Benghazi	0–0	Al Ta'awon

10 March 2026 11	Al-Suqoor	0–2	Al-Ahly Benghazi

14 March 2026 12	Al-Ahly Benghazi	2–2	Darnes

18 March 2026 13	Al-Ahly Benghazi	2–0	Al-Anwar

14 April 2026 14	Al-Borouq	0–2	Al-Ahly Benghazi

19 April 2026 15	Al-Ahly Benghazi	0–0	Al Ittihad Al Asskary

24 April 2026 16	Al Sadaqa	0–2	Al-Ahly Benghazi

==== Championship round ====
Round	1	2	3	4	5
Ground	H	H	A	A	A
Result	W	L	W	L	W
Position					

A = Away; H = Home; W = Win; D = Draw; L = Loss

7 May 2026 1	Al-Ahly Benghazi	2–1	Al Ittihad Al Asskary

11 May 2026 2	Al-Ahly Benghazi	1–2	Al Akhdar

15 May 2026 3	Al-Hilal Benghazi	1–2	Al-Ahly Benghazi

19 May 2026 4	Al-Nasr	1–0	Al-Ahly Benghazi

23 May 2026 5	Al-Afreeki	1–4	Al-Ahly Benghazi

=== Libyan Cup ===
14 February 2026 First round	Al-Ahly Benghazi	1–0	Al-Borouq

5 April 2026 Round of 16	Al-Ahly Benghazi	3–0	Al Ta'awon

30 April 2026 Quarter-finals	Al-Ahly Benghazi	2–1	Al-Hilal Benghazi

31 May 2026 Semi-finals	Al-Ahly Benghazi	0–0 (4–2 p)	Al Akhdar

9 June 2026 Final	Al-Ahly Benghazi	0–1	Al-Ahli Tripoli
