= Luís Miquissone =

Mozambican footballer (born 1995)

Personal information
- Full name: Luís Jose Miquissone
- Date of birth: 25 July 1995 (age 31)
- Place of birth: Maputo, Mozambique
- Height: 1.70 m (5 ft 7 in)
- Position: Midfielder

Team information
- Current team: Al Ahly SC

Senior career*
Years	Team	Apps	(Gls)
2014–2018	UD Songo		(15)
2018–2020	Mamelodi Sundowns	0	(0)
2018	→ Chippa United (loan)	0	(0)
2018–2019	→ Royal Eagles (loan)	1	(0)
2019–2020	→ UD Songo (loan)	28	(18)
2020–2021	Simba	50	(18)
2021–2023	Al Ahly	21	(5)
2022–2023	→ Abha (loan)	4	(0)
2023–2024	Simba	19	(0)
2025	UD Songo	0	(0)
2026-	Al Ahly SC	0	(0)

International career^{‡}
2013–2014	Mozambique U-20	?	(0)
2015–	Mozambique	40	(9)
- * Club domestic league appearances and goals ‡ National team caps and goals as of 7 September 2024

Luís Jose Miquissone (born 25 July 1995) is a Mozambican professional footballer who plays as a midfielder for Libyan Premier League club Al Ahly SC and the Mozambique national team.

== Club career ==
=== Mamelodi Sundowns ===
Miquissone was signed by Mamelodi Sundowns in January 2018 whilst Pitso Mosimane was the head coach but was immediately loaned out to Chippa United for the remainder of the 2017–18 South African Premier Division season, before being loaned to Royal Eagles for the 2018–19 National First Division season.

=== Simba ===
Miquissone joined Tanzanian club Simba in January 2020 exiting Sundowns without featuring in a match. He signed a two-year deal with the club and became their first signing of the season. He immediately became a fan's favourite and one of the club's top performers. He helped them to win the Ligi Kuu Bara in his debut season and later making it a double by winning the Tanzanian FA Cup. In August 2020, he won the Tanzanian Community Shield after Simba won the match through goals from John Bocco and Bernard Morrison. On 23 February 2021, he scored the lone goal in a 2020–21 CAF Champions League group stage match against his future club Al Ahly which was being coached by his former coach Pitso Mosimane, handing the Red Devils their only loss en route to achieve their tenth CAF Champions League title. He was adjudged the CAF Player of the Week for his performance. Ironically, after not making any appearance whilst at Sundowns with Pitso Mosimane in charge, from February 2021 to July 2021 he was now being linked with a move to Al Ahly, whilst Pitso was in charge. At the end of the 2020–21 season, his last season with Simba he won the Ligi Kuu Bara. On 25 July 2021, he also played a key role in the club completing a historic domestic double in two consecutive years after Taddeo Lwanga scored a lone goal in the final against fierce rivals Young Africans.

=== Al Ahly ===
In August 2021, Miquissone joined Egyptian giants Al Ahly on a four-year deal, his signing was announced by the club on the same day as South African Percy Tau. He became the first-ever Mozambican to sign for Al Ahly. After signing for the club, he described the club as being the biggest club in Africa. He made his debut on 21 September coming on in the 61st minute for Taher Mohamed during a their 2020–21 Egyptian Super Cup against Tala'ea El Gaish, with Al Ahly losing 3–2 in a penalty shootout after the match remained goalless after full time and extra time. Luis scored his first goal for Al Ahly on 22 February against Misr Lel Makasa in the 13th minute and scored another goal in the same match in the 15th minute. Luis Miquissone scored his third goal for Al Ahly against Ittihad Alexandria, in which Al Ahly won 1–0.

=== Abha ===
On 2 September 2022, Miquissone joined Saudi Arabian club Abha on a season-long loan.

== International career ==
Miquissone made his debut for the Mozambique national team on 29 March 2015 in a friendly match against Botswana, in the process he scored his debut goal scoring an equalizer to give Mozambique an eventual 2–1 victory.

== Career statistics ==
=== International goals ===
Scores and results list Mozambique's goal tally first.

No	Date	Venue	Opponent	Score	Result	Competition
1.	29 March 2015	Lobatse Stadium, Lobatse, Botswana	Botswana	1–1	2–1	Friendly
2.	20 June 2015	Estádio do Ferroviário, Beira, Mozambique	Seychelles	1–0	5–1	2016 African Nations Championship qualification
3.	20 June 2015	Estádio do Ferroviário, Beira, Mozambique	Seychelles	3–0	5–1	2016 African Nations Championship qualification
4.	4 July 2015	Stade Linité, Victoria, Seychelles	Seychelles	1–0	4–0	2016 African Nations Championship qualification
5.	27 May 2018	Old Peter Mokaba Stadium, Polokwane, South Africa	Madagascar	1–1	1–2	2018 COSAFA Cup
6.	29 May 2018	Seshego Stadium, Polokwane, South Africa	Comoros	2–0	3–0	2018 COSAFA Cup
7.	29 May 2018	Seshego Stadium, Polokwane, South Africa	Comoros	3–0	3–0	2018 COSAFA Cup
8.	31 May 2018	Peter Mokaba Stadium, Polokwane, South Africa	Seychelles	1–0	2–1	2018 COSAFA Cup
9.	4 August 2019	Estádio do Zimpeto, Maputo, Mozambique	Madagascar	3–0	3–2	2020 African Nations Championship qualification

== Honours ==
UD Songo

- Moçambola: 2017
- Taça de Moçambique: 2016, 2019

Simba

- Ligi Kuu Bara: 2019–20, 2020–21
- Tanzania FA Cup: 2019–20, 2020–21
- Tanzania Community Shield: 2020

Al Ahly

- FIFA Club World Cup Third-Place: 2021
- Egypt Cup: 2021–22

Individual

- Ligi Kuu Bara Player of the Month: March 2021
