= Adrar =

Adrar (in Tifinagh script "ⴰⴷⵔⴰⵔ"), a Berber word meaning "mountain", is the name of several areas in Northwest Africa:

== Algeria ==
- Adrar, Algeria, a town in Algeria
- Adrar Province, an administrative division of Algeria
- Adrar District, a district of Adrar Province, Algeria
- Adrar Afao, the highest peak in the Tassili n'Ajjer range in SE Algeria
- Adrar n Jerjer, a mountain range of the Tell Atlas

== Mauritania ==
- Adrar Plateau, a natural and historical region of the Sahara in Mauritania
- Adrar Region, an administrative division of Mauritania

== Mali ==
- Adrar des Ifoghas, a massif in the Kidal Region of Mali
