= Mohamed Magdy =

Egyptian footballer (born 1996)

Mohamed Magdy محمد مجدي
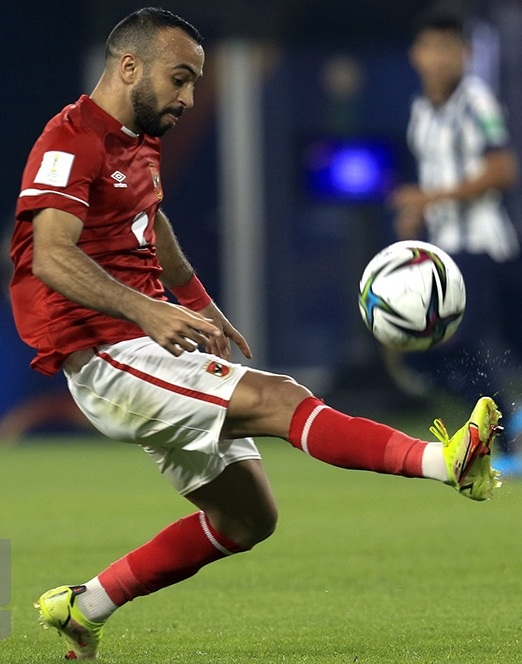
- Afsha with Al Ahly at the 2021 FIFA Club World Cup

Personal information
- Full name: Mohamed Magdy Mohamed Morsy
- Date of birth: 6 March 1996 (age 30)
- Place of birth: Kombera, Giza, Egypt
- Height: 1.68 m (5 ft 6 in)
- Position: Attacking midfielder

Team information
- Current team: Al Ahly
- Number: 19

Youth career
- Kombera
- ENPPI

Senior career*
Years	Team	Apps	(Gls)
2013–2018	ENPPI	61	(9)
2014–2015	→ El Raja (loan)	17	(2)
2018–2019	Pyramids	23	(5)
2019–	Al Ahly	277	(45)
2026	→ Al Ittihad (loan)	18	(2)

International career^{‡}
2018–	Egypt	22	(7)
- * Club domestic league appearances and goals as of 30 May 2026 ‡ National team caps and goals as of 2 December 2025

Mohamed Magdy Mohamed Morsy (Arabic: محمد مجدي محمد مرسي; born 6 March 1996), known by his nickname Afsha (Arabic: قفشة), is an Egyptian professional footballer who plays as an attacking midfielder for Egyptian Premier League club Al Ahly.

== Club career ==
Afsha started his career at ENPPI and Pyramids, before joining Al Ahly in 2019. In the 2020 CAF Champions League Final, he scored the iconic winning goal for Al Ahly in a 2–1 victory over their rivals Zamalek. He also netted in a 3–0 win over Kaizer Chiefs in the 2021 CAF Champions League Final.

On 4 February 2023, Afsha scored the only goal in a 1–0 victory over Seattle Sounders FC in the 2022 FIFA Club World Cup second round, sending Al-Ahly to the semi-finals.

== Career statistics ==
=== Club ===
As of 31 October 2025

Appearances and goals by club, season and competition
Club	Season	League			Egypt Cup		Continental		Other		Total	
Club	Season	Division	Apps	Goals	Apps	Goals	Apps	Goals	Apps	Goals	Apps	Goals
ENPPI	2013–14	EPL	13	0	2	0	—		—		15	0
ENPPI	2015–16	EPL	4	0	3	0	—		—		7	0
ENPPI	2016–17	EPL	14	1	2	1	—		—		16	2
ENPPI	2017–18	EPL	30	8	1	0	—		—		31	8
ENPPI	Total		61	9	8	1	0	0	0	0	69	10
El Raja (loan)	2014–15	EPL	17	2	1	0	—		—		18	2
Pyramids	2018–19	EPL	23	5	1	1	—		—		24	6
Al Ahly	2018–19	EPL	0	0	1	0	0	0	1	0	2	0
Al Ahly	2019–20	EPL	29	5	4	1	9	3	1	0	43	9
Al Ahly	2020–21	EPL	31	6	5	1	12	3	5	0	53	10
Al Ahly	2021–22	EPL	26	8	3	0	11	2	5	0	45	10
Al Ahly	2022–23	EPL	29	3	5	2	9	0	4	1	47	6
Al Ahly	2023–24	EPL	26	4	1	0	12	2	8	1	47	7
Al Ahly	2024–25	EPL	4	1	0	0	4	1	5	1	13	3
Al Ahly	Total		145	27	19	4	57	11	29	3	250	45
Career total			246	43	29	6	57	11	29	3	361	63

=== International ===
As of match played 2 December 2025.

Appearances and goals by national team and year
National team	Year	Apps	Goals
Egypt	2018	1	0
Egypt	2019	3	0
Egypt	2020	2	1
Egypt	2021	11	3
Egypt	2022	2	0
Egypt	2023	0	0
Egypt	2024	2	0
Egypt	2025	2	1
Total		22	7

As of 2 December 2025

Scores and results list Egypt's goal tally first, score column indicates score after each Afsha goal.

List of international goals scored by Afsha
No.	Date	Venue	Opponent	Score	Result	Competition
1.	17 November 2020	Stade de Kégué, Lomé, Togo	Togo	1–0	3–1	2021 Africa Cup of Nations qualification
2.	25 March 2021	Nyayo National Stadium, Nairobi, Kenya	Kenya	1–0	1–1	2021 Africa Cup of Nations qualification
3.	1 September 2021	30 June Stadium, Cairo, Egypt	Angola	1–0	1–0	2022 FIFA World Cup qualification
4.	16 November 2021	Borg El Arab Stadium, Cairo, Egypt	Gabon	1–0	2–1	2022 FIFA World Cup qualification
5.	1 December 2021	Al Thumama Stadium, Al Thumama, Qatar	Lebanon	1–0	1–0	2021 FIFA Arab Cup
6.	6 September 2025		Tunisia	1–0	1–0	Friendly
7.	2 December 2025	Lusail Stadium, Lusail, Qatar	Kuwait	1–1	1–1	2025 FIFA Arab Cup

== Honours ==
Al Ahly

- Egyptian Premier League: 2019–20, 2022–23, 2023–24
- Egypt Cup: 2019–20, 2021–22, 2022–23
- Egyptian Super Cup: 2019, 2022, 2023, 2023–24, 2024
- CAF Champions League: 2019–20, 2020–21, 2022–23, 2023–24
- CAF Super Cup: 2021 (May), 2021 (December)
- FIFA African–Asian–Pacific Cup: 2024
