= Ricky Tulengi =

Congolese footballer

Personal information
- Full name: Ricky Tulengi Sindani
- Date of birth: 2 February 1993 (age 33)
- Place of birth: Zaire
- Position: Midfielder

Team information
- Current team: FC Oqtepa
- Number: 21

Senior career*
Years	Team	Apps	(Gls)
2019–2020	Difaâ El Jadida	3	(0)
2020–	AS Vita Club		

International career^{‡}
2016–	DR Congo	9	(0)
- * Club domestic league appearances and goals as of 21 January 2020 ‡ National team caps and goals as of 21 January 2020

Ricky Tulengi (born 2 February 1993) is a Congolese professional footballer who plays as a midfielder.
