= Mosa Lebusa =

South African soccer player

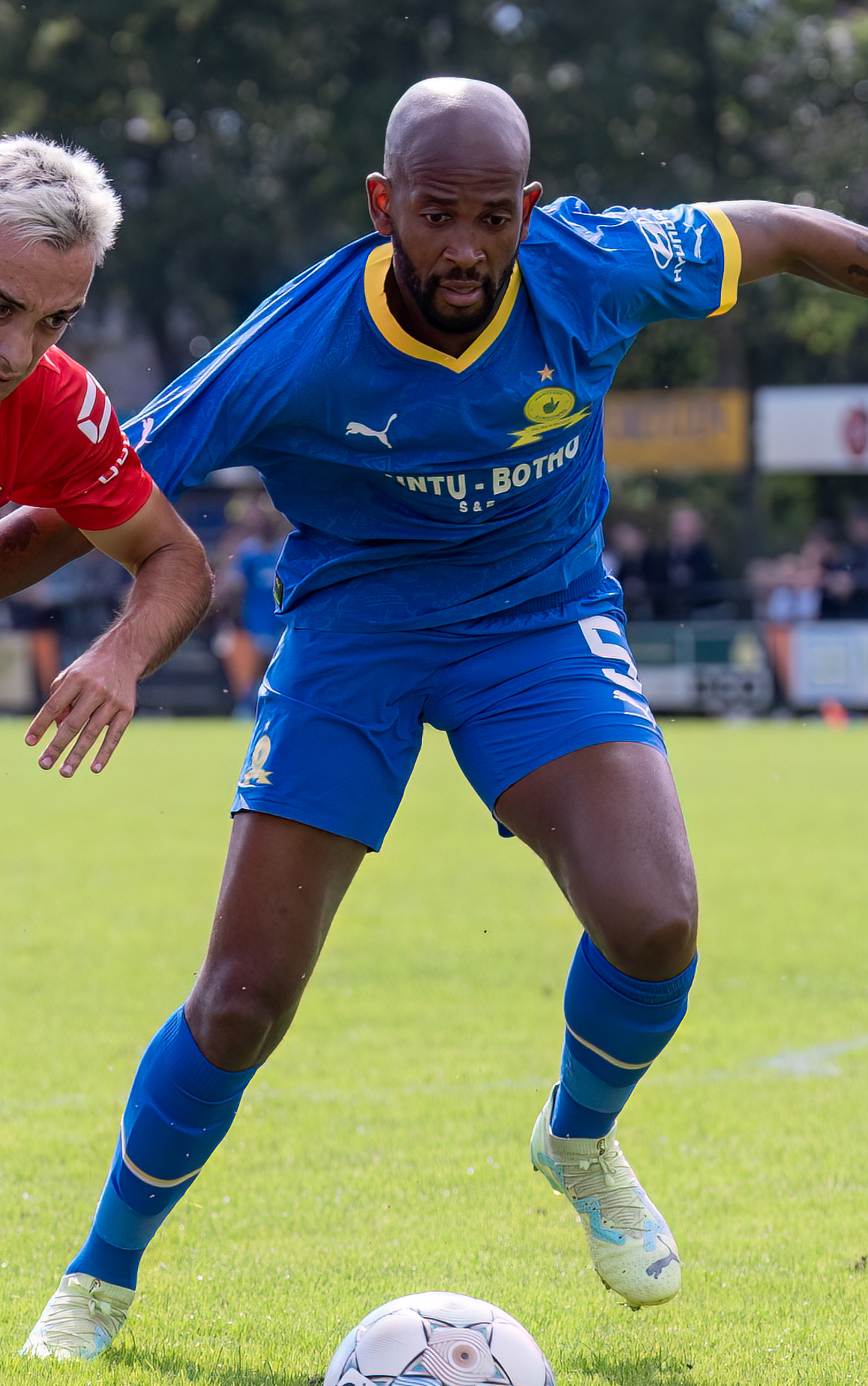

Personal information
- Full name: Mosa Lebusa
- Date of birth: 10 October 1992 (age 34)
- Place of birth: Welkom, South Africa
- Height: 1.83 m (6 ft 0 in)
- Positions: Centre-back; left-back

Team information
- Current team: Stellenbosch FC
- Number: 5

Youth career
- Dinonyana FC
- Ajax Cape Town

Senior career*
Years	Team	Apps	(Gls)
2012–2018	Ajax Cape Town	129	(9)
2018–2025	Mamelodi Sundowns	209	(9)
2026-	Stellenbosch FC	0	(0)

International career^{‡}
2015–	South Africa	4	(0)
- * Club domestic league appearances and goals as of 3 January 2026 ‡ National team caps and goals as of 10:53, 15 November 2020 (UTC)

Mosa Lebusa (born 10 October 1992) is a South African professional soccer player who plays for Stellenbosch FC.
