= 2021 FIFA Club World Cup =

International association football tournament held in 2022

FIFA Club World Cup UAE 2021 presented by Alibaba Cloud كأس العالم للأندية لكرة القدم الإمارات العربية المتحدة 2021

Tournament details
- Host country: United Arab Emirates
- Dates: 3–12 February 2022
- Teams: 7 (from 6 confederations)
- Venues: 2 (in 1 host city)

Final positions
- Champions: (England) Chelsea (1st title)
- Runners-up: (Brazil) Palmeiras
- Third place: (Egypt) Al Ahly
- Fourth place: (Saudi Arabia) Al-Hilal

Tournament statistics
- Matches played: 8
- Goals scored: 27 (3.38 per match)
- Attendance: 100,752 (12,594 per match)
- Top scorer(s): (Belgium) Romelu Lukaku (Chelsea) (Brazil) Raphael Veiga (Palmeiras) (Egypt) Yasser Ibrahim (Al Ahly) (Mali) Abdoulay Diaby (Al-Jazira); 2 goals each
- Best player: (Brazil) Thiago Silva (Chelsea)
- Fair play award: (England) Chelsea

The 2021 FIFA Club World Cup (officially known as the FIFA Club World Cup UAE 2021 presented by Alibaba Cloud for sponsorship reasons) was the 18th edition of the FIFA Club World Cup, a FIFA-organised international club football tournament between the winners of the six continental confederations, as well as the host nation's league champions. The tournament was held from 3 to 12 February 2022 in the United Arab Emirates.

Defending champions Bayern Munich did not qualify as they were eliminated in the quarter-finals of the 2020–21 UEFA Champions League. The eventual winners of that competition, Chelsea, won the Club World Cup for the first time, beating Al-Hilal of Saudi Arabia 1–0 in the semi-finals before requiring extra time to claim a 2–1 win over Brazilian side Palmeiras in the final.

== Host appointment ==
An expanded Club World Cup in China was planned to be held in June and July 2021. However, due to fixture congestion caused by the postponement of the 2020 Summer Olympics and the impact of the COVID-19 pandemic on football, the Tokyo Olympics, UEFA European Championship and Copa América were postponed from mid-2020 to mid-2021. As a result, FIFA announced in March 2020 that they would postpone the expanded Club World Cup to later in 2021, 2022 or 2023, before commencing it in 2025.

On 4 December 2020, the FIFA Council announced that the Club World Cup, using the previous format, would be held in late 2021 and hosted by Japan. However, on 8 September 2021, the Japan Football Association dropped its commitment to host the tournament, owing to the possibility of restrictions on fan attendance due to the COVID-19 pandemic in Japan. Numerous countries expressed interest in hosting the tournament as bidding was reopened, including Brazil, Egypt, Qatar, Saudi Arabia, South Africa, and the United Arab Emirates. On 20 October 2021, the FIFA Council named the United Arab Emirates as the host of the tournament, and postponed the event from late 2021 to early 2022.

== Qualified teams ==
Location of the teams participating in the 2021 FIFA Club World Cup

Team	Confederation	Qualification	Qualified date	Participation
Entering in the semi-finals
(Brazil) Palmeiras	CONMEBOL	Winners of the 2021 Copa Libertadores	27 November 2021	2nd (Previous: 2020)
(England) Chelsea	UEFA	Winners of the 2020–21 UEFA Champions League	29 May 2021	2nd (Previous: 2012)
Entering in the second round
(Saudi Arabia) Al-Hilal	AFC	Winners of the 2021 AFC Champions League	23 November 2021	2nd (Previous: 2019)
(Egypt) Al Ahly	CAF	Winners of the 2020–21 CAF Champions League	17 July 2021	7th (Previous: 2005, 2006, 2008, 2012, 2013, 2020)
(Mexico) Monterrey	CONCACAF	Winners of the 2021 CONCACAF Champions League	28 October 2021	5th (Previous: 2011, 2012, 2013, 2019)
Entering in the first round
(French Polynesia) AS Pirae	OFC	Nominated by OFC (Note: The 2021 OFC Champions League was cancelled due to the COVID-19 pandemic. Initially New Zealand's Auckland City were nominated to represent the OFC based on sporting merit principles, but they withdrew due to logistical complications related to the pandemic, and AS Pirae were chosen in their place.)	31 December 2021	Debut
(United Arab Emirates) Al-Jazira	AFC (host)	Winners of the 2020–21 UAE Pro League	20 October 2021 (Note: Although Al-Jazira won the UAE Pro League on 11 May, and the last remaining team from the United Arab Emirates in the 2021 AFC Champions League was eliminated on 16 October, Al-Jazira's participation was not confirmed until the United Arab Emirates was appointed as tournament host on 20 October.)	2nd (Previous: 2017)

== Venues ==
The matches were played at two venues in the city of Abu Dhabi, both of which hosted matches at the 2019 AFC Asian Cup.

Abu Dhabi		Location of the host city of the 2021 FIFA Club World Cup.
Mohammed bin Zayed Stadium	Al Nahyan Stadium	Location of the host city of the 2021 FIFA Club World Cup.
Capacity: 37,500	Capacity: 15,000	Location of the host city of the 2021 FIFA Club World Cup.

== Match officials ==
Five referees, ten assistant referees, and seven video assistant referees were appointed for the tournament.

Confederation	Referees	Assistant referees	Video assistant referees
AFC	(Australia) Chris Beath	(Australia) Anton Shchetinin; (Australia) Ashley Beecham	(United Arab Emirates) Ammar Al-Jeneibi
CAF	(Algeria) Mustapha Ghorbal	(Algeria) Mokrane Gourari; (Algeria) Abdelhak Etchiali	
CONCACAF	(Mexico) César Ramos	(Mexico) Alberto Morin; (Mexico) Miguel Hernández	(Canada) Drew Fischer
CONMEBOL	(Argentina) Fernando Rapallini	(Argentina) Juan Pablo Belatti; (Argentina) Diego Bonfá	(Colombia) Nicolás Gallo; (Argentina) Mauro Vigliano
UEFA	(France) Clément Turpin	(France) Nicolas Danos; (France) Cyril Gringore	(France) Willy Delajod; (Italy) Massimiliano Irrati; (Netherlands) Pol van Boekel

One support referee was also named for the tournament.

Confederation	Support referee
OFC	(Papua New Guinea) David Yareboinen

Semi-automated offside technology was tested during the tournament.

== Squads ==
Each team named a 23-man squad (three of whom had to be goalkeepers). Injury replacements were allowed until 24 hours before the team's first match.

== Matches ==
The draw of the tournament was held on 29 November 2021, 17:00 CET (UTC+1), at the FIFA headquarters in Zurich, Switzerland, to decide the matchups of the second round (between the first round winner and teams from AFC, CAF and CONCACAF), and the opponents of the two second round winners in the semi-finals (against teams from CONMEBOL and UEFA).

If a match was tied after normal playing time:

- For elimination matches, extra time was played. If still tied after extra time, a penalty shoot-out was held to determine the winner.
- For the matches for fifth place and third place, no extra time was played, and a penalty shoot-out was held to determine the winner.

First round
3 February – Abu Dhabi (MBZ)
(United Arab Emirates) Al-Jazira	4
(French Polynesia) AS Pirae	1

Second round
6 February – Abu Dhabi (MBZ)
(Saudi Arabia) Al-Hilal	6
(United Arab Emirates) Al-Jazira	1
5 February – Abu Dhabi (ANS)
(Egypt) Al Ahly	1
(Mexico) Monterrey	0

Semi-finals
9 February – Abu Dhabi (MBZ)
(Saudi Arabia) Al-Hilal	0
(England) Chelsea	1
8 February – Abu Dhabi (ANS)
(Brazil) Palmeiras	2
(Egypt) Al Ahly	0
Match for fifth place
9 February – Abu Dhabi (ANS)
(Mexico) Monterrey	3
(United Arab Emirates) Al-Jazira	1

Final
12 February – Abu Dhabi (MBZ)
(England) Chelsea (a.e.t.)	2
(Brazil) Palmeiras	1
Match for third place
12 February – Abu Dhabi (ANS)
(Saudi Arabia) Al-Hilal	0
(Egypt) Al Ahly	4

All times are local, GST (UTC+4).

=== First round ===
3 February 2022
20:30

Al-Jazira (United Arab Emirates)	4–1	(French Polynesia) AS Pirae
Al-Ameri 5'; A. Al-Attas 25'; Kosanović 41'; Diaby 63'	Report	Rabii 48' (o.g.)

Mohammed bin Zayed Stadium, Abu Dhabi
Attendance: 4,970
Referee: Mustapha Ghorbal (Algeria)

=== Second round ===
5 February 2022
20:30

Al Ahly (Egypt)	1–0	(Mexico) Monterrey
Hany 53'	Report

Al Nahyan Stadium, Abu Dhabi
Attendance: 9,396
Referee: Chris Beath (Australia)

6 February 2022
20:30

Al-Hilal (Saudi Arabia)	6–1	(United Arab Emirates) Al-Jazira
Ighalo 36'; Pereira 40'; Kanno 57'; Al-Dawsari 77'; Marega 88'; Carrillo 90+2' (pen.)	Report	Diaby 14'

Mohammed bin Zayed Stadium, Abu Dhabi
Attendance: 12,538
Referee: César Ramos (Mexico)

=== Semi-finals ===
8 February 2022
20:30

Palmeiras (Brazil)	2–0	(Egypt) Al Ahly
Veiga 39'; Dudu 49'	Report

Al Nahyan Stadium, Abu Dhabi
Attendance: 11,902
Referee: Clément Turpin (France)

9 February 2022
20:30

Al-Hilal (Saudi Arabia)	0–1	(England) Chelsea
	Report	Lukaku 32'

Mohammed bin Zayed Stadium, Abu Dhabi
Attendance: 19,175
Referee: César Ramos (Mexico)

=== Match for fifth place ===
9 February 2022
17:30

Monterrey (Mexico)	3–1	(United Arab Emirates) Al-Jazira
Sultan 4' (o.g.); Funes Mori 11'; Montes 25'	Report	Bruno 90+1'

Al Nahyan Stadium, Abu Dhabi
Attendance: 892
Referee: Mustapha Ghorbal (Algeria)

=== Match for third place ===
12 February 2022
17:00

Al-Hilal (Saudi Arabia)	0–4	(Egypt) Al Ahly
	Report	Ibrahim 8', 17'; Abdel Kader 40'; El Solia 64'

Al Nahyan Stadium, Abu Dhabi
Attendance: 9,008
Referee: Clément Turpin (France)

=== Final ===
12 February 2022
20:30

Chelsea (England)	2–1 (a.e.t.)	(Brazil) Palmeiras
Lukaku 54'; Havertz 117' (pen.)	Report	Veiga 64' (pen.)

Mohammed bin Zayed Stadium, Abu Dhabi
Attendance: 32,871
Referee: Chris Beath (Australia)

== Goalscorers ==
Rank	Player	Team	Goals
1	(Mali) Abdoulay Diaby	(United Arab Emirates) Al-Jazira	2
1	(Egypt) Yasser Ibrahim	(Egypt) Al Ahly	2
1	(Belgium) Romelu Lukaku	(England) Chelsea	2
1	(Brazil) Raphael Veiga	(Brazil) Palmeiras	2
5	(Egypt) Ahmed Abdel Kader	(Egypt) Al Ahly	1
5	(United Arab Emirates) Zayed Al-Ameri	(United Arab Emirates) Al-Jazira	1
5	(United Arab Emirates) Ahmed Al-Attas	(United Arab Emirates) Al-Jazira	1
5	(Saudi Arabia) Salem Al-Dawsari	(Saudi Arabia) Al-Hilal	1
5	(Brazil) Bruno	(United Arab Emirates) Al-Jazira	1
5	(Peru) André Carrillo	(Saudi Arabia) Al-Hilal	1
5	(Brazil) Dudu	(Brazil) Palmeiras	1
5	(Egypt) Amr El Solia	(Egypt) Al Ahly	1
5	(Mexico) Rogelio Funes Mori	(Mexico) Monterrey	1
5	(Egypt) Mohamed Hany	(Egypt) Al Ahly	1
5	(Germany) Kai Havertz	(England) Chelsea	1
5	(Nigeria) Odion Ighalo	(Saudi Arabia) Al-Hilal	1
5	(Saudi Arabia) Mohamed Kanno	(Saudi Arabia) Al-Hilal	1
5	(Serbia) Miloš Kosanović	(United Arab Emirates) Al-Jazira	1
5	(Mali) Moussa Marega	(Saudi Arabia) Al-Hilal	1
5	(Mexico) César Montes	(Mexico) Monterrey	1
5	(Brazil) Matheus Pereira	(Saudi Arabia) Al-Hilal	1

1 own goal

- (Morocco) Mohammed Rabii (Al-Jazira, against AS Pirae)
- (United Arab Emirates) Zayed Sultan (Al-Jazira, against Monterrey)

== Awards ==
The following awards were given at the conclusion of the tournament. Thiago Silva of Chelsea won the Golden Ball award, sponsored by Adidas, which is jointly awarded with the Alibaba Cloud Award to recognise the player of the tournament.

Adidas Golden Ball Alibaba Cloud Award	Adidas Silver Ball	Adidas Bronze Ball
(Brazil) Thiago Silva (Chelsea)	(Brazil) Dudu (Palmeiras)	(Brazil) Danilo (Palmeiras)
FIFA Fair Play Award
(England) Chelsea

FIFA also named a man of the match for the best player in each game at the tournament.

Alibaba Cloud Match Award
Match	Man of the match	Club	Opponent	Ref.
1	(United Arab Emirates) Mohammed Jamal	(United Arab Emirates) Al-Jazira	(French Polynesia) AS Pirae	
2	(Egypt) Ramy Rabia	(Egypt) Al Ahly	(Mexico) Monterrey	
3	(Brazil) Matheus Pereira	(Saudi Arabia) Al-Hilal	(United Arab Emirates) Al-Jazira	
4	(Brazil) Raphael Veiga	(Brazil) Palmeiras	(Egypt) Al Ahly	
5	(Argentina) Maximiliano Meza	(Mexico) Monterrey	(United Arab Emirates) Al-Jazira	
6	(Croatia) Mateo Kovačić	(England) Chelsea	(Saudi Arabia) Al-Hilal	
7	(Egypt) Yasser Ibrahim	(Egypt) Al Ahly	(Saudi Arabia) Al-Hilal	
8	(Germany) Antonio Rüdiger	(England) Chelsea	(Brazil) Palmeiras	
