= Amr El Solia =

Egyptian footballer (born 1990)

Amr El Solia عمرو السولية
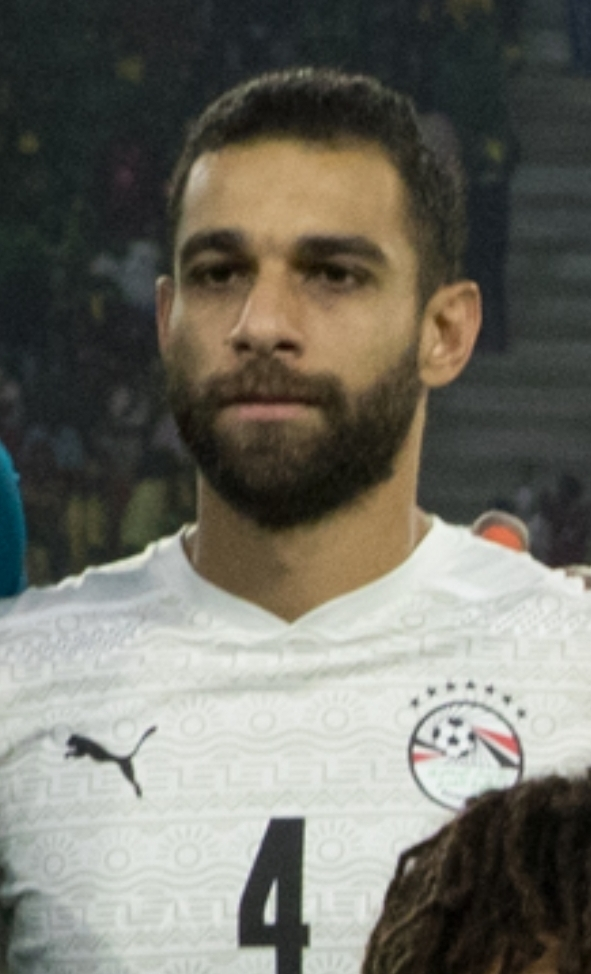
- El Solia with Egypt at the 2021 Africa Cup of Nations

Personal information
- Full name: Amr Mohamed Eid El Solia
- Date of birth: 2 April 1990 (age 36)
- Place of birth: Mansoura, Egypt
- Height: 1.83 m (6 ft 0 in)
- Position: Midfielder

Team information
- Current team: Ceramica Cleopatra
- Number: 17

Youth career
- Baladeyet El-Mahalla
- Ismaily

Senior career*
Years	Team	Apps	(Gls)
2009–2015	Ismaily	125	(16)
2015–2016	Al Shaab	12	(3)
2016–2025	Al Ahly	287	(19)
2025–	Ceramica Cleopatra	12	(2)

International career
2009–2012	Egypt U23	21	(4)
2010–	Egypt	52	(1)
Medal record
Representing Egypt
Men's football
Africa Cup of Nations
Runner-up	2021 Cameroon
- * Club domestic league appearances and goals as of 2 November 2025

Amr Mohamed Eid El Solia (Arabic: عمرو محمد عيد السولية; born on 2 April 1990) is an Egyptian professional footballer who plays as a midfielder for Egyptian Premier League club Ceramica Cleopatra and the Egypt national team. He featured in the 2021 AFCON final match against Senegal.

== Career ==
In July 2014, El Solia was linked with a move to Norwegian Tippeligaen side Stabæk, managed by former Egypt manager Bob Bradley, but this move never came to fruition.

El Solia is the first player to score in three CAF Champions League Finals, after scoring in the 2018 CAF Champions League Final against Espérance de Tunis, 2020 CAF Champions League Final against Zamalek and in the 2021 CAF Champions League Final against Kaizer Chiefs.

In July 2025, El Solia joined Ceramica Cleopatra.

== Career statistics ==
=== With clubs ===
Team	Season	League		Cup		Continental tournaments		Other tournaments		Total	
Team	Season	App	Goals	App	Goals	App	Goals	App	Goals	App	Goals
Ismaily SC	2008–09	1	0			—				1	0
Ismaily SC	2009–10	27	3	4	0	11	0	—		42	3
Ismaily SC	2010–11	26	3	1	0	2	0	—		29	3
Ismaily SC	2011–12	12	0	0	0	—				12	0
Ismaily SC	2012–13	14	4	0	0	5	0	—		19	4
Ismaily SC	2013–14	10	1	3	1	—				13	2
Ismaily SC	2014–15	36	4	2	2	—				38	6
Ismaily SC	Total	126	15	10	3	18	0	—		154	18
Al Shaab	2015–16	12	3	6	0	—				18	3
Al Shaab	Total	12	3	6	0	—				18	3
Al Ahly SC	2015–16	10	0	2	1	4	0	—		16	1
Al Ahly SC	2016–17	22	1	3	0	13	0	0	0	38	1
Al Ahly SC	2017–18	30	2	3	2	11	1	0	0	44	5
Al Ahly SC	2018–19	27	2	2	0	10	1	1	0	40	3
Al Ahly SC	2019–20	28	7	2	0	13	1	1	0	43	8
Al Ahly SC	2020–21	25	2	4	0	11	1	4	0	41	3
Al Ahly SC	2021–22	17	1	2	0	11	1	2	1	35	3
Al Ahly SC	2022–23	19	4	0	0	8	0	3	0	30	4
Al Ahly SC	2023–24	1	0	0	0	5	0	5	0	11	0
Total		179	19	18	3	86	5	19	1	302	28

=== International ===
As of match played 14 June 2022

National Team	Year	Apps	Goals
Egypt	2010	3	0
Egypt	2011	7	0
Egypt	2013	6	0
Egypt	2014	2	0
Egypt	2015	1	0
Egypt	2019	2	0
Egypt	2020	1	0
Egypt	2021	15 (Note: Six appearances in FIFA Arab Cup)	1
Egypt	2022	11 (Note: Six appearances in Africa Cup of Nations)	0
Total		48	1

List of international goals scored by Amr El Solia
No.	Date	Venue	Opponent	Score	Result	Competition
1	7 December 2021	Al Janoub Stadium, Al Wakrah, Qatar	Algeria	1–1	1–1	2021 FIFA Arab Cup

== Honours ==
Al Ahly

- Egyptian Premier League: 2015–16, 2016–17, 2017–18, 2018–19, 2019–20, 2022–23, 2023–24
- Egypt Cup: 2016–17, 2019–20, 2021–22, 2022–23
- Egyptian Super Cup: 2018, 2019, 2022, 2023–24, 2024
- CAF Champions League: 2019–20, 2020–21, 2022–23, 2023–24
- CAF Super Cup: 2021 (May), 2021 (Dec)
- FIFA Club World Cup third-place: 2020, 2021, 2023
- FIFA African–Asian–Pacific Cup: 2024

Egypt

- Africa Cup of Nations runner-up: 2021
