= Yasser Ibrahim =

Egyptian footballer (born 1993)

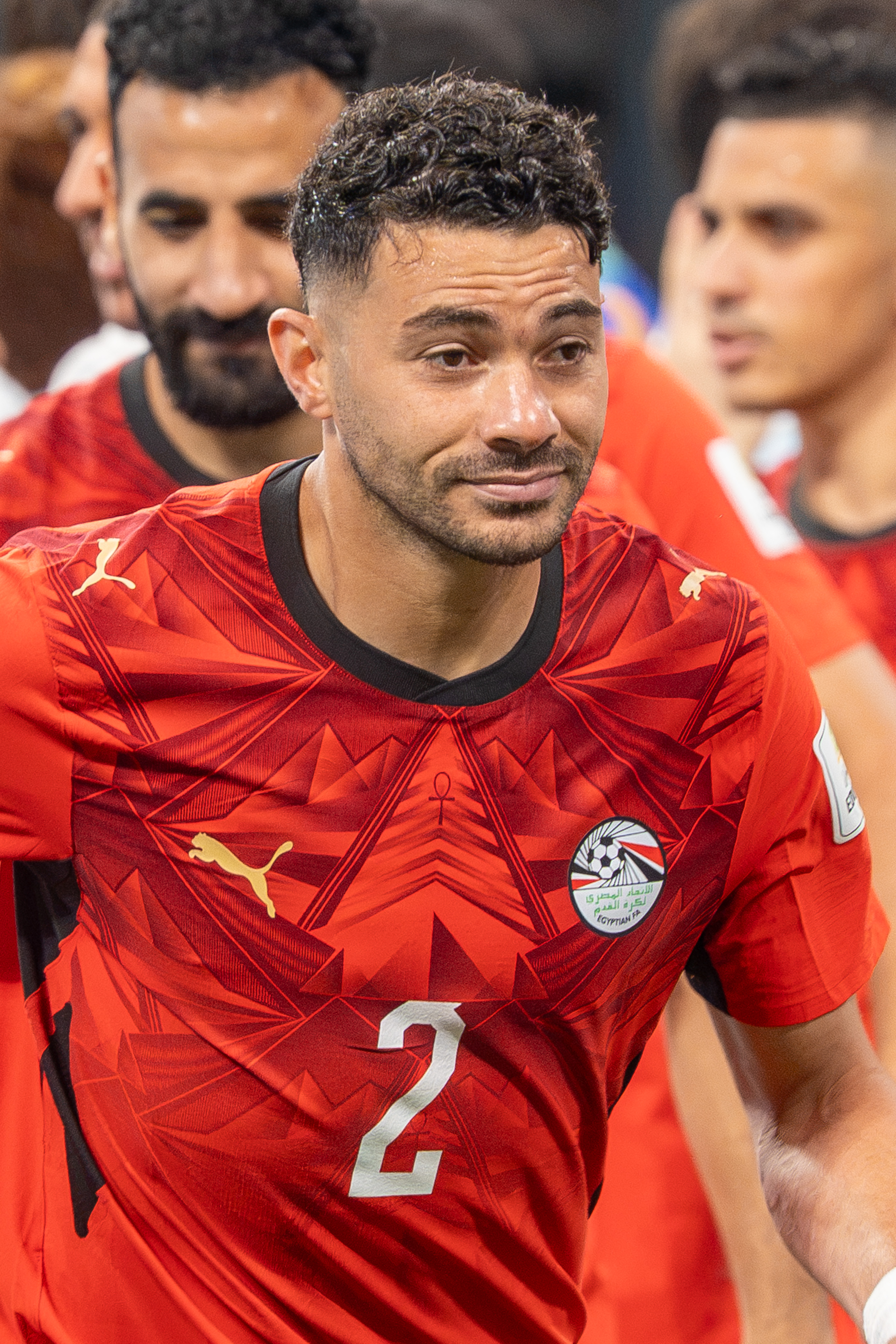
- Ibrahim with Egypt in 2026

Personal information
- Full name: Yasser Ibrahim Ahmed El Hanafi
- Date of birth: 10 February 1993 (age 33)
- Place of birth: Mansoura, Egypt
- Height: 1.85 m (6 ft 1 in)
- Position: Centre-back

Team information
- Current team: Al Ahly
- Number: 6

Youth career
- Mansoura

Senior career*
Years	Team	Apps	(Gls)
2011–2013	Mansoura		
2013–2015	Zamalek	10	(1)
2014–2015	→ Smouha (loan)	18	(0)
2015–2018	Smouha	80	(1)
2019–	Al Ahly	83	(3)

International career^{‡}
2011	Egypt U19	1	(0)
2013	Egypt U20	22	(0)
2014–2015	Egypt U23	4	(0)
2022–	Egypt	23	(2)
- * Club domestic league appearances and goals as of 26 July 2023 ‡ National team caps and goals as of 7 July 2026

Yasser Ibrahim Ahmed El Hanafi (Note: Arabic: ياسر إبراهيم أحمد الحنفي) (born 10 February 1993) is an Egyptian professional footballer who plays as a centre-back for Egyptian Premier League club Al Ahly and the Egypt national team.

== Club career ==
Born in Mansoura, Egypt, Ibrahim began his football journey with the youth academy of his hometown club, Mansoura SC. Ibrahim commenced his senior career at El Mansoura SC, where he played from 2011 to 2013.

In 2013, he transferred to Zamalek SC, making 10 league appearances and scoring once. During his tenure, he contributed to the team's Egypt Cup victory in the 2013–14 season. Initially joining Smouha SC on loan in 2014, Ibrahim's move became permanent in 2015. Over four seasons, he amassed 80 league appearances and netted one goal.

On 7 January 2019, Ibrahim signed with Al Ahly SC. Since then, he has been instrumental in the club's defense, contributing to multiple domestic and continental titles.

== International career ==
On 2 December 2025, Ibrahim was called up to the Egypt squad for the 2025 Africa Cup of Nations. He was named in the 26-man squad for the 2026 FIFA World Cup. He scored his first World Cup goal, opening the scoring in a 3–2 defeat to Argentina in the round of 16.

== Career statistics ==
=== Club ===
As of match played 23 February 2024

Appearances and goals by club, season and competition
Club	Season	League			National Cup		Continental		Other		Total	
Club	Season	Division	Apps	Goals	Apps	Goals	Apps	Goals	Apps	Goals	Apps	Goals
Zamalek	2013–14	Egyptian Premier League	10	1	1	0	8	0	0	0	19	1
Smouha	2014–15	Egyptian Premier League	18	0	1	0	9	0	—		28	0
Smouha	2015–16	Egyptian Premier League	17	0	2	0	—		—		19	0
Smouha	2016–17	Egyptian Premier League	18	0	3	0	0	0	—		21	0
Smouha	2017–18	Egyptian Premier League	30	1	4	1	—		—		34	2
Smouha	2018–19	Egyptian Premier League	15	0	1	0	—		—		16	0
Smouha	Total		98	1	11	1	9	0	—		118	2
Al Ahly	2018–19	Egyptian Premier League	13	0	0	0	5	0	1	0	19	0
Al Ahly	2019–20	Egyptian Premier League	14	1	4	0	8	1	1	0	23	2
Al Ahly	2020–21	Egyptian Premier League	18	1	3	0	11	2	3	0	31	3
Al Ahly	2021–22	Egyptian Premier League	17	0	0	0	12	0	3	2	32	2
Al Ahly	2022-23	Egyptian Premier League	21	1	2	0	9	0	1	0	33	1
Al Ahly	2023-24	Egyptian Premier League	4	1	—		6	0	6	0	16	1
Al Ahly	Total		87	4	9	0	68	3	15	2	154	9
Career total			195	6	21	1	45	3	15	2	291	12

=== International ===
As of match played 7 July 2026

National Team	Year	Apps	Goals
Egypt U-19	2011	2	0
Egypt U-20	2013	7	0
Egypt U-23	2014	2	0
Egypt U-23	2015	2	0
Egypt	2022	4	0
Egypt	2023	2	0
Egypt	2025	5	0
Egypt	2026	12	2
Total		23	2

As of match played 7 July 2026
Egypt score listed first, score column indicates score after each Ibrahim goal.

No.	Date	Venue	Opponent	Score	Result	Competition
1	5 January 2026	Adrar Stadium, Adrar, Morocco	Benin	2–1	3–1	2025 Africa Cup of Nations
2	7 July 2026	Mercedes-Benz Stadium, Atlanta, United States	Argentina	1–0	2–3	2026 FIFA World Cup

== Honours ==
=== Club ===
Zamalek

- Egypt Cup: 2013–14

Al Ahly

- Egyptian Premier League: 2018–19, 2019–20, 2022–23
- Egypt Cup: 2019–20, 2021–22, 2022–23
- Egyptian Super Cup: 2018–19, 2023–24
- CAF Champions League: 2019–20, 2020–21, 2022–23, 2023-24
- CAF Super Cup: 2021 (May), 2021 (December)
- FIFA African–Asian–Pacific Cup: 2024

=== International ===
Egypt U20

- Africa U-20 Cup of Nations: 2013

=== Individual ===
- FIFA Club World Cup top scorer: 2021
