= Mohamed Sherif =

Egyptian footballer (born 1996)

Mohamed Sherif محمد شريف
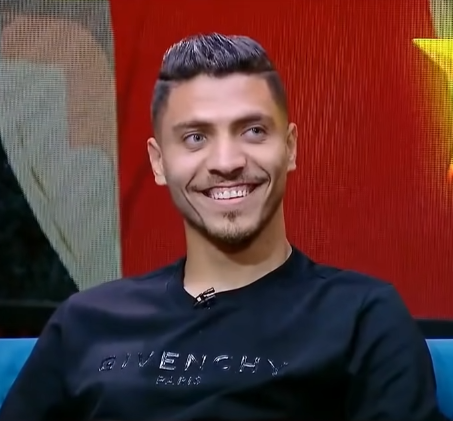
- Sherif in 2021

Personal information
- Full name: Mohamed Sherif Mohamed Ragaei Bakr
- Date of birth: 4 February 1996 (age 30)
- Place of birth: Cairo, Egypt
- Height: 1.86 m (6 ft 1 in)
- Position: Striker

Team information
- Current team: Al-Zawraa (on loan from Al Ahly)

Youth career
- –2015: Wadi Degla

Senior career*
Years	Team	Apps	(Gls)
2015–2018	Wadi Degla	61	(4)
2018–2023	Al Ahly	88	(41)
2019–2020	→ ENNPI (loan)	30	(14)
2023–2025	Al-Khaleej	45	(9)
2025–	Al Ahly	15	(2)
2026–	→ Al-Zawraa (loan)	0	(0)

International career^{‡}
2020–	Egypt	18	(5)
Medal record
Representing Egypt
Men's football
Africa Cup of Nations
Runner-up	2021 Cameroon
- * Club domestic league appearances and goals as of 15 August 2026 ‡ National team caps and goals as of 3 February 2022

Mohamed Sherif Mohamed Ragaei Bakr (Arabic: محمد شريف محمد رجائي بكر; born 4 February 1996) is an Egyptian professional footballer who plays as a striker for Iraqi Premier League club Al-Zawraa, on loan from Egyptian Premier League club Al Ahly, and the Egypt national team.

== Career ==
Sherif was the 2020–21 CAF Champions League top goalscorer with six goals, the first player from Al Ahly to achieve this since Mohamed Aboutrika in the 2006 CAF Champions League. In addition, Sherif was the League top goal scorer with 21 goals. On 14 August 2026, he joined Iraqi Premier League club Al-Zawraa on loan for the 2026–27 season.

== Career statistics ==
=== Club ===
As of 31 July 2024

Appearances and goals by club, season and competition
Club	Season	League			Cup		Continental		Other		Total	
Club	Season	Division	Apps	Goals	Apps	Goals	Apps	Goals	Apps	Goals	Apps	Goals
Wadi Degla	2014–15	EPL	2	0	0	0	—		—		2	0
Wadi Degla	2015–16	EPL	21	1	1	0	—		—		22	1
Wadi Degla	2016–17	EPL	19	1	2	1	—		—		21	2
Wadi Degla	2017–18	EPL	19	2	2	2	—		—		21	4
Wadi Degla	Total		61	4	5	3	0	0	0	0	66	7
Al Ahly	2017–18	EPL	3	0	0	0	0	0	0	0	3	0
Al Ahly	2018–19	EPL	6	2	1	2	2	0	0	0	9	4
Al Ahly	2020–21	EPL	31	20	1	0	14	7	3	0	48	28
Al Ahly	2021–22	EPL	20	7	5	0	14	6	2	0	41	13
Al Ahly	2022–23	EPL	28	11	1	0	13	2	4	1	46	14
Al Ahly	Total		88	41	8	2	43	15	9	1	158	60
ENPPI (loan)	2019–20	EPL	30	14	1	0	—		—		31	14
Al-Khaleej	2023–24	SPL	30	6	3	0	—		—		33	6
Career total			208	65	17	5	43	15	9	1	283	87

=== International ===
As of 4 December 2021

Scores and results list Egypt's goal tally first, score column indicates score after each Sherif goal.

List of international goals scored by Mohamed Sherif
No.	Date	Venue	Opponent	Score	Result	Competition
1	17 November 2020	Stade de Kégué, Lomé, Togo	Togo	2–0	3–1	2021 Africa Cup of Nations qualification
2	29 March 2021	Cairo International Stadium, Cairo, Egypt	Comoros	2–0	4–0	2021 Africa Cup of Nations qualification
3	4 December 2021	Stadium 974, Doha, Qatar	Sudan	5–0	5–0	2021 FIFA Arab Cup

== Honours ==
Al Ahly

- Egyptian Premier League: 2017–18, 2018–19, 2022–23
- CAF Champions League: 2020–21, 2022–23
- CAF Super Cup: 2021 (May), 2021 (December)
- Egypt Cup: 2021–22
- Egyptian Super Cup: 2021–22

Individual

- Egyptian Premier League top goalscorer: 2020–21
- CAF Champions League top goalscorer: 2020–21
