= List of football clubs in Niger =

The following is an incomplete list of association football clubs based in Niger. For a complete list see Category:Football clubs in Niger

== A ==
- Akokana FC d'Arlit (Arlit)
- Alkali Nassara Club (Maradi)
- AS Bourja (Maradi)
- AS Douanes (Niamey)
- AS-FNIS (Niamey)
- AS Madaoua
- AS NIGELEC (Niamey)
- ASFAN (Niamey)
- Askia
- AS Police (Niamey)
- ASAF Zinder (Zinder)
- AS Toudou (Agadez)

== D ==
- Dan Gourmou FC (Tahoua)
- Dan Kassawa FC (Maradi)

== E ==
- Entente FC
- Espoir FC (Niger)
- Etoile Rouge

== J ==
- Jangorzo FC
- JS Ader
- JS du Ténéré

== K ==
- Kandadji Sport
- Kandarga FC

== L ==
- Lada FC
- Lantarki FC

== M ==
- Malbaza FC

== N ==
- National Dendi FC
- Nassara FC Tessaoua
- Ni'ima FC

== O ==
- Olympic FC de Niamey

== R ==
- Racing Club de Lazaret

== S ==
- Sahel SC
- Soniantcha FC

== T ==
- Telwa FC

== U ==
- Urana FC

== W ==
- Wombeye AC

== Z ==
- Zumunta AC
