= 2017–18 Ligue 1 (Niger) =

Ligue 1
- Season: 2017–18
- Champions: AS SONIDEP

The 2017–18 Ligue 1 season is the 48th edition (since independence) of the top level of football competition in Niger. It began on 22 December 2017 and ended on 12 August 2018.

== Standings ==
Pos	Team	Pld	W	D	L	GF	GA	GD	Pts	Qualification or relegation
1	AS SONIDEP	30	20	8	2	46	13	+33	68	Champions
2	AS GNN	30	16	7	7	40	24	+16	55	
3	AS FAN	30	15	9	6	62	31	+31	54	
4	ASN NIGELEC	30	12	11	7	43	31	+12	47	
5	US Gendarmerie Nationale	30	14	5	11	36	29	+7	47	
6	Police	30	12	10	8	44	27	+17	46	
7	Akokana FC	30	10	14	6	25	24	+1	44	
8	Sahel	30	12	5	13	28	26	+2	41	
9	Douanes	30	9	11	10	32	32	0	38	
10	Urana	30	6	16	8	18	23	−5	34	
11	AS Racing FC de Boukoki	30	6	12	12	22	39	−17	30	
12	JS Tahoua FC	30	6	12	12	31	48	−17	30	
13	Espoir FC	30	5	13	12	26	51	−25	28	
14	Jangorzo	30	6	10	14	33	46	−13	28	
15	Olympic	30	6	8	16	25	43	−18	26	Qualification to relegation play-offs
16	Entente	30	4	11	15	26	50	−24	23	Relegation to lower division

Updated to match(es) played on unknown. Source:

== See also ==
- 2018 Niger Cup
