= 2016–17 Ligue 1 (Niger) =

Ligue 1
- Season: 2016–17
- Champions: AS FAN

The 2016–17 Ligue 1 season is the top level of football competition in Niger. It began on 4 December 2016 and concluded on 25 June 2017.

== Standings ==
Pos	Team	Pld	W	D	L	GF	GA	GD	Pts	Qualification or relegation
1	AS FAN (C)	26	15	7	4	47	21	+26	52	Champions
2	Gendarmerie Nationale	26	15	1	10	36	24	+12	46	
3	Douanes	26	13	5	8	46	26	+20	44	
4	AS GNN	26	11	7	8	38	19	+19	40	
5	Police	26	10	9	7	30	29	+1	39	
6	Sahel	26	9	9	8	30	29	+1	36	
7	Olympic	26	9	9	8	22	26	−4	36	
8	AS SONIDEP	26	8	11	7	22	20	+2	35	
9	ASN Nigelec	26	9	8	9	19	25	−6	35	
10	Urana	26	8	9	9	15	18	−3	33	
11	Jangorzo	26	8	6	12	31	37	−6	30	
12	Akokana	26	7	8	11	24	26	−2	29	
13	Racing de Boukoki (O)	26	4	12	10	19	33	−14	24	Relegation Play-off
14	Tagour Provincial Club (R)	26	5	1	20	17	63	−46	16	Relegation

(C) Champions; (O) Play-off winners; (R) Relegated
