= 2015–16 Ligue 1 (Niger) =

Ligue 1
- Season: 2015–16
- Champions: AS FAN

The 2015–16 Ligue 1 season is the top level of football competition in Niger. It began on 25 December 2015 and concluded on 1 August 2016.

== Standings ==
Pos	Team	Pld	W	D	L	GF	GA	GD	Pts	Qualification or relegation
1	AS FAN	26	18	7	1	56	11	+45	61	League Champions
2	Sahel SC	26	14	6	6	38	25	+13	48	
3	AS GNN	26	13	7	6	44	20	+24	46	
4	AS Douanes	26	13	6	7	39	18	+21	45	
5	US Gendarmerie Nationale	26	9	13	4	38	25	+13	40	
6	Akokana FC	26	10	8	8	33	27	+6	38	
7	ASN Nigelec	26	10	8	8	35	31	+4	38	
8	AS SONIDEP	26	8	11	7	25	20	+5	35	
9	Urana FC	26	6	11	9	24	29	−5	29	
10	AS Police	26	7	8	11	17	25	−8	29	
11	Olympic FC	26	6	7	13	22	39	−17	25	
12	Tagour Provincial Club	26	7	4	15	20	58	−38	25	
13	Espoir FC	26	5	5	16	17	48	−31	20	Relegation play-offs
14	Dan Kassawa FC	26	3	5	18	17	49	−32	14	Relegated to lower division
