= 2018–19 Super Ligue (Niger) =

Super Ligue
- Season: 2018–19
- Champions: AS SONIDEP
- Relegated: Tahoua; Akokana

The 2018–19 Super Ligue is the 49th season (since independence) of the Super Ligue, the top-tier football league in Niger. The season started on 28 December 2018. AS SONIDEP were crowned champions. They also won the domestic cup tournament and the super cup in the league season.

== Standings ==
Pos	Team	Pld	W	D	L	GF	GA	GD	Pts	Qualification or relegation
1	AS SONIDEP (C)	26	17	7	2	37	13	+24	58	Champions
2	Police	26	15	7	4	38	21	+17	52	
3	AS GNN	26	12	8	6	33	24	+9	44	
4	AS FAN	26	11	8	7	30	21	+9	41	
5	Sahel	26	10	11	5	35	28	+7	41	
6	Gendarmerie Nationale	26	10	5	11	27	27	0	35	
7	ASN Nigelec	26	7	11	8	32	20	+12	32	
8	Racing de Boukoki	26	7	10	9	27	34	−7	31	
9	Douanes	26	6	10	10	20	20	0	28	
10	Jangorzo	26	7	7	12	25	38	−13	28	
11	Espoir	26	7	6	13	19	46	−27	27	
12	Urana	26	4	12	10	23	27	−4	24	
13	JS Tahoua (R)	26	5	9	12	23	36	−13	24	Relegation
14	Akokana (R)	26	3	11	12	15	29	−14	20	Relegation

(C) Champions; (R) Relegated

== Attendances ==
#	Football club	Average attendance
1	Sahel SC	2,216
2	AS FAN	2,027
3	AS SONIDEP	987
4	Espoir FC	784
5	US GN	478
6	AS GNN	401
7	ASN NIGELEC	310
8	Urana FC	204
9	AS Police Nationale	169
10	AS Douane de Niamey	168
11	Racing de Boukoki	136
12	JS Tahoua	122
13	Akokana FC	111
14	Jangorzo FC	109
