= Niger national under-20 football team =

National under-20 association football team representing Niger

Niger U-20
- Nickname: Ménas
- Association: Nigerien Football Federation
- Confederation: CAF (Africa)
- Sub-confederation: WAFU (West Africa)
- Head coach: (Niger) Ismaïla Tiemoko
- Home stadium: Stade Seyni Kountché
- FIFA code: NIG
First colours	Second colours

First international
- Niger 1–2 Tunisia (Niamey, Niger; 10 August 1990)

Biggest win
- Niger 3–0 Liberia (Niamey, Niger; 22 April 2013)

Biggest defeat
- Niger 0–1 Nigeria (Niamey, Niger; 8 February 2019)

Africa U-20 Cup of Nations
- Appearances: 1 (first in 2019)
- Best result: Group stage (2019)

The Niger national under-20 football team represents Niger in international football through the Nigerien Football Federation, a member of Confederation of African Football (CAF). Niger plays in the colors of the flag of Niger, white, green and orange. Their nickname comes from the Dama gazelle, native to Niger, the Hausa name of which is Meyna or Ménas The Dama appears on their badge in the colors of the national flag.

== Players ==
The following squad was called up of recent 2021 Arica U-20 Cup of Nations qualifiers.

No.	Pos.	Player	Date of birth (age)	Club
1	GK	Abdoul Kahar Issoufou	7 September 1999 (aged 19)	(Nigerien Football Federation) AS Police
2	MF	Yacine Wa Massamba	9 March 2000 (aged 18)	(Nigerien Football Federation) ASN Nigelec
3	DF	Ismael Issaka	18 July 2000 (aged 18)	(Nigerien Football Federation) AS Police
4	DF	Nasser Mahaman	24 September 2000 (aged 18)	(Nigerien Football Federation) Jangorzo FC
5	MF	Abdoul Moumouni Amadou	7 August 2002 (aged 16)	(Nigerien Football Federation) US GN
6	MF	Issah Salou	4 February 1999 (aged 19)	(Ghana Football Association) Sporting Club
7	MF	Abdoul Kader Aboubacar	31 December 2000 (aged 18)	(Nigerien Football Federation) Urana FC
8	MF	Mahamadou Sabo	30 May 2000 (aged 18)	(Nigerien Football Federation) AS SONIDEP
9	FW	Kairou Amoustapha	1 January 2001 (aged 18)	(Nigerien Football Federation) ASN Nigelec
10	MF	Rachid Alfari	30 December 2000 (aged 18)	(Nigerien Football Federation) AS FAN
11	FW	Abdoul Malik Moustapha	12 November 2001 (aged 17)	(Nigerien Football Federation) Racing FC
12	DF	Djibrilla Ibrahim	2 March 2002 (aged 16)	(Ghana Football Association) Cheetah FC
13	DF	Maman Bachir Moussa	8 August 2000 (aged 18)	(Nigerien Football Federation) AS Douanes
14	DF	Inoussa Amadou	5 September 2000 (aged 18)	(Nigerien Football Federation) AS SONIDEP
15	FW	Seyni Koudou	1 January 2000 (aged 19)	(Nigerien Football Federation) AS Zam
16	GK	Abdoulaye Boubacar	1 January 2001 (aged 18)	(Nigerien Football Federation) AS FAN
17	FW	Ibrahim Boubacar	1 January 2000 (aged 19)	(Football Association of Slovenia) ND Ilirija 1911
18	DF	Ibrahim Namata	10 May 2000 (aged 18)	(Nigerien Football Federation) Sahel SC
19	MF	Boubacar Goumey	14 July 2000 (aged 18)	(Nigerien Football Federation) ASN Nigelec
20	DF	Djabiri Ibrahim	10 October 1999 (aged 19)	(Nigerien Football Federation) Urana FC
21	GK	Khaled Lawali	15 July 2000 (aged 18)	(Nigerien Football Federation) Sahel SC

== Recent fixtures & results ==
The following is a list of match results from the previous 12 months, as well as any future matches that have been scheduled.

Win Draw Loss

== Competitive records ==
=== FIFA U-20 World Cup ===
Year	Round	GP	W	D*	L	GS	GA	GD
(Tunisia) 1977	Did not participate	-	-	-	-	-	-	-
(Japan) 1979	Did not participate	-	-	-	-	-	-	-
(Australia) 1981	Did not participate	-	-	-	-	-	-	-
(Mexico) 1983	Withdrew	-	-	-	-	-	-	-
(Soviet Union) 1985	Did not qualify	-	-	-	-	-	-	-
(Chile) 1987	Disqualified	-	-	-	-	-	-	-
(Saudi Arabia) 1989	Did not qualify	-	-	-	-	-	-	-
(Portugal) 1991	Did not qualify	-	-	-	-	-	-	-
(Australia) 1993	Did not qualify	-	-	-	-	-	-	-
(Qatar) 1995	Did not qualify	-	-	-	-	-	-	-
(Malaysia) 1997	Did not qualify	-	-	-	-	-	-	-
(Nigeria) 1999	Did not qualify	-	-	-	-	-	-	-
(Argentina) 2001	Did not qualify	-	-	-	-	-	-	-
(United Arab Emirates) 2003	Did not qualify	-	-	-	-	-	-	-
(Netherlands) 2005	Did not qualify	-	-	-	-	-	-	-
(Canada) 2007	Did not qualify	-	-	-	-	-	-	-
(Egypt) 2009	Did not qualify	-	-	-	-	-	-	-
(Colombia) 2011	Did not qualify	-	-	-	-	-	-	-
(Turkey) 2013	Did not qualify	-	-	-	-	-	-	-
(New Zealand) 2015	Did not qualify	-	-	-	-	-	-	-
(South Korea) 2017	Did not qualify	-	-	-	-	-	-	-
(Poland) 2019	Did not qualify	-	-	-	-	-	-	-
(Argentina) 2023	Did not qualify	-	-	-	-	-	-	-
(Chile) 2025	Did not qualify	-	-	-	-	-	-	-
(Azerbaijan) (Uzbekistan) 2027	To be determined	-	-	-	-	-	-	-
Total	0/25	0	0	0	0	0	0	+0

=== Africa U-20 Cup of Nations ===
Year	Round	GP	W	D	L	GS	GA	GD
1977	Did not participate	-	-	-	-	-	-	-
1979	Did not participate	-	-	-	-	-	-	-
1981	Did not participate	-	-	-	-	-	-	-
1983	Did not participate	-	-	-	-	-	-	-
1985	Did not qualify	-	-	-	-	-	-	-
1987	Disqualified	-	-	-	-	-	-	-
1989	Did not qualify	-	-	-	-	-	-	-
(Egypt) 1991	Did not qualify	-	-	-	-	-	-	-
(Mauritius) 1993	Did not qualify	-	-	-	-	-	-	-
(Nigeria) 1995	Did not qualify	-	-	-	-	-	-	-
(Morocco) 1997	Did not qualify	-	-	-	-	-	-	-
(Ghana) 1999	Did not qualify	-	-	-	-	-	-	-
(Ethiopia) 2001	Did not qualify	-	-	-	-	-	-	-
(Burkina Faso) 2003	Did not qualify	-	-	-	-	-	-	-
(Benin) 2005	Did not qualify	-	-	-	-	-	-	-
(Democratic Republic of the Congo) 2007	Did not qualify	-	-	-	-	-	-	-
(Rwanda) 2009	Did not qualify	-	-	-	-	-	-	-
(South Africa) 2011	Did not qualify	-	-	-	-	-	-	-
(Algeria) 2013	Did not qualify	-	-	-	-	-	-	-
(Senegal) 2015	Did not qualify	-	-	-	-	-	-	-
(Zambia) 2017	Did not qualify	-	-	-	-	-	-	-
(Niger) 2019	Group stage	3	0	2	1	4	5	-1
(Mauritania) 2021	Did not qualify	-	-	-	-	-	-	-
(Egypt) 2023	Did not qualify	-	-	-	-	-	-	-
Total	1/23	3	0	2	1	4	5	-1
