= Abdoulaye Katkoré =

Nigerien footballer

Personal information
- Full name: Abdoulaye Boureima Katkoré Amadou
- Date of birth: 26 March 1993 (age 33)
- Place of birth: Niamey, Niger
- Height: 1.89 m (6 ft 2 in)
- Position: Centre-back

Youth career
- ASN Nigelec

Senior career*
Years	Team	Apps	(Gls)
2012–2015	ASN Nigelec		
2015–2018	AS FAN		
2018–2019	Safa		
2019–2023	AS Douanes		
2023–2024	Al-Minaa		
2024	Al-Zulfi		
2024–2025	Al-Entesar		

International career^{‡}
2014–	Niger	67	(0)
- * Club domestic league appearances and goals as of 27 September 2025 ‡ National team caps and goals as of 4 June 2025

Abdoulaye Boureima Katkoré (born 26 March 1993) is a Nigerien professional footballer who plays for the Niger national team. Mainly a central defender, he can also play as a right-back.

== Club career ==
He joined Al-Minaa in Iraq in October 2023. On 25 January 2024, Katkoré joined Saudi club Al-Zulfi.

== International career ==
Katkoré made his full international debut with the Niger national team on 22 May 2014, starting in a friendly match 2–1 loss against Ukraine.

== Honours ==
ASN Nigelec

- Niger Cup: 2013

AS FAN

- Niger Premier League: 2016, 2017
