= Abdoul Razak Seyni =

Nigerien footballer

Personal information
- Date of birth: 1 January 1990 (age 36)
- Place of birth: Niamey, Niger
- Height: 1.80 m (5 ft 11 in)
- Position: Defender

Team information
- Current team: USGN

Senior career*
Years	Team	Apps	(Gls)
2012–2013	Olympic		
2013–2015	Liberté		
2015–2017	Sahel		
2017–2019	SONIDEP		
2019–	US Gendarmerie Nationale		

International career^{‡}
2018–	Niger	14	(1)
- * Club domestic league appearances and goals as of 26 April 2021 ‡ National team caps and goals as of 26 April 2021

Abdoul Razak Seyni (born 1 January 1990) is a Nigerien footballer who plays for US Gendarmerie Nationale. He was a squad member for the 2020 African Nations Championship.

== International career ==
=== International goals ===
Scores and results list Niger's goal tally first.

No.	Date	Venue	Opponent	Score	Result	Competition
1.	10 October 2019	Stade Général Seyni Kountché, Niamey, Niger	Zambia	1–1	1–1	Friendly
