= Football in Niger =

- Country: Niger
- Governing body: Nigerien Football Federation
- National teams: Niger national football team Niger women's national football team

Club competitions
- Super Ligue

International competitions
- CAF Champions League; CAF Confederation Cup; CAF Super Cup; FIFA Club World Cup; FIFA World Cup (National Team); African Cup of Nations (National Team)

Football is the most popular sport in Niger, a nation of over 26 million. Approximately 30% of the people in Niger are interested in football.

== International ==
Despite the sport's popularity in the country, Niger have so far been rather unsuccessful in international football, never winning a major tournament and failing to qualify for any FIFA World Cup finals, though they did reach the quarterfinals of qualifying for the 1982 World Cup, losing to Algeria. They either failed to qualify for or were forced to withdraw from every African Nations Cup between 1969 and 2010. Niger finally participated in the competition for the first time in 2012 after topping a qualifying group that included South Africa and Egypt. Later that year, they defeated Guinea over two legs to reach the 2013 Africa Cup of Nations. On both occasions, Niger finished bottom of their group, gaining a solitary point in 2013. They have been unable to qualify for any subsequent edition of the tournament, despite the competition's expansion from 16 teams to 24 from 2019 onwards.

As of 2023, there are no Nigerien nationals playing with top level European clubs. In the 2000s, a handful of Nigerien internationals have played in Europe including Moussa Yahaya at Legia Warsaw in Poland and Ibrahim Tankary in Belgium's Jupiler League. Moussa Narry, a Nigerien citizen but a Ghana international, played in the Netherlands and with AJ Auxerre and Le Mans FC of France.

== Domestic ==
Football in Niger is almost entirely amateur, with some of the ten teams in the Niger Premier League (begun in 1966) being semi-professional. The Niger Cup (begun in 1974) is open to amateur leagues throughout the nation. League play has been dominated by clubs from the capital city of Niamey, with Sahel SC Niamey and Olympic FC de Niamey capturing almost two thirds of the titles between them. Below this there are numerous local and national amateur leagues and competitions. Many sections of the Nigerien government, notably the police and armed forces, sponsor amateur clubs.

Football's popularity and the Nigerien people's passion for the international game were highlighted by former World Footballer of the Year Zinedine Zidane's visit to Niger in 2007. Mobbed by fans at every stop, Zidane delivered funds and toured projects both football- and development-related.

== Nigerien football topics ==
- Nigerien Football Federation
- Niger men's national football team
- Niger women's national football team

=== Football stadiums in Niger ===
#	Stadium	Capacity	City	Tenants	Image
1	Stade Général Seyni Kountché	50,000	Niamey	Niger national football team	
2	Stade municipal	10,000	Niamey		
3	Stade de Zinder	10,000	Zinder		

=== Nigerien footballers ===
- Ismaël Alassane
- Kassaly Daouda
- Alhassane Issoufou
- Daouda Kamilou
- Moussa Maazou
- Abdoul Moumouni
- Mohammed Muyei
- Moussa Narry
- Ibrahim Tankary
- Moussa Yahaya

=== Nigerien international referees ===
- Lucien Bouchardeau (1961–2018)
- Ibrahim Chaibou (born 1966)

== Attendances ==
The average attendance per top-flight football league season and the club with the highest average attendance:

Season	League average	Best club	Best club average
2018-19	587	Sahel SC	2,216

Source: League page on Wikipedia

== See also ==
- Lists of stadiums
