= Souleymane Dela Sacko =

Nigerien football midfielder (born 1984)

Dela Sacko
Personal information
- Full name: Souleymane Dela Sacko
- Date of birth: 19 November 1984 (age 41)
- Place of birth: Niamey, Niger
- Height: 1.84 m (6 ft 0 in)
- Position: Central midfielder

Team information
- Current team: AS SONIDEP

Senior career*
Years	Team	Apps	(Gls)
2006–2007	Étoile Filante Ouagadougou		
2007–2008	AS Korofina		
2008–2009	AS Mangasport		
2009–2010	Sourou Sport		
2010–2013	AS Mangasport		
2013–2014	Olympic Niamey		
2014–2016	AS GNN		
2016–2017	AS Douanes		
2017–2019	AS GNN		
2019–	AS SONIDEP		

International career^{‡}
2007–2019	Niger	53	(3)
- * Club domestic league appearances and goals ‡ National team caps and goals as of 3 November 2021

Souleymane Dela Sacko (born 19 November 1984) is a Nigerien footballer who plays as a midfielder for AS SONIDEP and the Niger national football team. He was part of the team in World Cup qualifiers.

== Career ==
He previously played in Étoile Filante Ouagadougou in Burkina Faso.

== International career ==
He is a member of the Niger national football team. He usually wears number 12. He was the captain of the team in 2008.

=== International goals ===
Scores and results list Niger's goal tally first.

List of international goals scored by Souleymane Dela Sacko
No.	Date	Venue	Opponent	Score	Result	Competition
1	3 June 2007	Stade Général-Seyni-Kountché, Niamey, Niger	Lesotho	2–0	2–0	2008 Africa Cup of Nations qualification
2	27 July 2013	Stade Général-Seyni-Kountché, Niamey, Niger	Burkina Faso	1–0	1–0 (5–6 p)	2014 African Nations Championship qualification
3	14 June 2015	Stade Général-Seyni-Kountché, Niamey, Niger	Namibia	1–0	1–0	2017 Africa Cup of Nations qualification
