= Kader Amadou =

Nigerien footballer (born 1989)

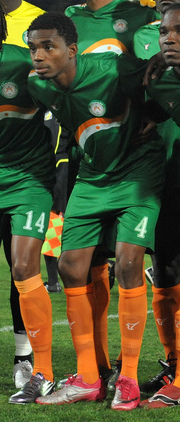
- Amadou with Niger in 2011

Personal information
- Full name: Amadou Abdoul Kader Dodo
- Date of birth: 3 April 1989 (age 37)
- Place of birth: Niamey, Niger
- Height: 1.85 m (6 ft 1 in)
- Positions: Right-back; centre-back

Team information
- Current team: AS SONIDEP

Senior career*
Years	Team	Apps	(Gls)
2007–2009	Olympic F.C.		
2009–2010	ASFAN		
2010–2011	Cotonsport FC		
2012–2015	Olympic F.C.		
2015–	AS SONIDEP		

International career
2006–2016	Niger	29	(0)
- * Club domestic league appearances and goals

Kader Amadou Dodo (born 5 April 1989) is a Nigerien footballer who plays as a right-back or centre-back for AS SONIDEP.

== Early life ==
Amadou was born in Niamey, Niger.

== Club career ==
In November 2010 Amadou left ASFAN and signed for Cotonsport FC de Garoua. From 2011/12 season he plays in Olympic F.C. again. He is right-footed, 185 cm tall and has 75 kg.

== International career ==
Kader played for the Niger national team. He was part of the team in World Cup 2010 qualifiers, and 2012 African Nations Cup.
