= 2020–21 CAF Champions League qualifying rounds =

- Dates: 28 November 2020 – 6 January 2021

Tournament statistics
- Matches played: 67
- Goals scored: 143 (2.13 per match)

The 2020–21 CAF Champions League qualifying rounds were played from 28 November 2020 to 6 January 2021. A total of 54 teams competed in the qualifying rounds to decide the 16 places in the group stage of the 2020–21 CAF Champions League.

== Draw ==
The draw for the qualifying rounds was held on 9 November 2020 at the CAF headquarters in Cairo, Egypt.

The entry round of the 54 teams entered into the draw was determined by their performances in the CAF competitions for the previous five seasons (CAF 5-year ranking points shown in parentheses).

Entry round	First round (10 teams)	Preliminary round (44 teams)
Teams	(Egypt) Al Ahly (69 pts); (Morocco) Wydad AC (65 pts); (Tunisia) Espérance de Tunis (63 pts); (Democratic Republic of the Congo) TP Mazembe (55 pts); (Egypt) Zamalek (54 pts); (South Africa) Mamelodi Sundowns (49 pts); (Morocco) Raja Casablanca (39 pts); (Guinea) Horoya (38 pts); (Democratic Republic of the Congo) AS Vita Club (23 pts); (Angola) 1º de Agosto (22 pts)	(Sudan) Al Hilal (21.5 pts); (Nigeria) Enyimba (21 pts); (Tunisia) CS Sfaxien (16 pts); (Angola) Petro de Luanda (12 pts); (Tanzania) Simba (12 pts); (Kenya) Gor Mahia (11 pts); (Libya) Al Nasr (10 pts); (Zimbabwe) FC Platinum (9 pts); (Zambia) Nkana (8 pts); (Algeria) MC Alger (7 pts); (Ghana) Asante Kotoko (4 pts); (Sudan) Al Merrikh (4 pts); (Mauritania) FC Nouadhibou (2.5 pts); (Republic of the Congo) AS Otohô (2 pts); (Algeria) CR Belouizdad; (Benin) Buffles du Borgou; (Botswana) Jwaneng Galaxy; (Burkina Faso) Rahimo; (Burundi) Le Messager Ngozi; (Cameroon) PWD Bamenda; (Chad) Gazelle; (Comoros) US Zilimadjou; (Djibouti) GR/SIAF; (Eswatini) Young Buffaloes; (Ethiopia) Mekelle 70 Enderta; (Equatorial Guinea) Akonangui; (Gabon) AS Bouenguidi; (The Gambia) Gambia Armed Forces; (Guinea) Ashanti de Siguiri; (Ivory Coast) RC Abidjan; (Lesotho) Bantu; (Libya) Al Ahly Benghazi; (Mali) Stade Malien; (Mozambique) Costa do Sol; (Niger) AS SONIDEP; (Nigeria) Plateau United; (Rwanda) APR; (Senegal) Teungueth; (Somalia) Mogadishu City; (South Africa) Kaizer Chiefs; (Togo) ASKO Kara; (Uganda) Vipers; (Zambia) Forest Rangers; (Zanzibar) Mlandege

== Format ==
In the qualifying rounds, each tie was played on a home-and-away two-legged basis. If the aggregate score was tied after the second leg, the away goals rule would be applied, and if still tied, extra time would not be played, and the penalty shoot-out would be used to determine the winner (Regulations III. 13 & 14).

== Schedule ==
The schedule of the competition was as follows.

Round	First leg	Second leg
Preliminary round	28–29 November 2020	4–6 December 2020
First round	22–23 December 2020	5–6 January 2021

== Bracket ==
The bracket of the draw was announced by the CAF on 9 November 2020. The 16 winners of the first round advanced to the group stage, while the 16 losers of the first round entered the Confederation Cup play-off round.

Preliminary round
1	(Guinea) Ashanti de Siguiri	1	0	1
4	(Mali) Stade Malien	2	2 (awd.)	4
3	(Morocco) Wydad AC	Bye
2

First round
(Mali) Stade Malien	1	0	1
(Morocco) Wydad AC	0	3	3

Preliminary round
1	(The Gambia) Gambia Armed Forces	1	0	1
4	(Senegal) Teungueth	1	2	3
3	(Morocco) Raja Casablanca	Bye
2

First round
(Senegal) Teungueth (p)	0	0	0 (3)
(Morocco) Raja Casablanca	0	0	0 (1)

Preliminary round
1	(Ivory Coast) RC Abidjan (a)	1	1	2
4	(Togo) ASKO Kara	0	2	2
3	(Guinea) Horoya	Bye
2

First round
(Ivory Coast) RC Abidjan	1	0	1
(Guinea) Horoya	1	1	2

Preliminary round
1	(Niger) AS SONIDEP	2	2	4
4	(Somalia) Mogadishu City	0	0	0
3	(Egypt) Al Ahly	Bye
2

First round
(Niger) AS SONIDEP	0	0	0
(Egypt) Al Ahly	1	4	5

Preliminary round
1	(Libya) Al Ahly Benghazi	—	—	w/o
4	(Ethiopia) Mekelle 70 Enderta	—	—
3	(Tunisia) Espérance de Tunis	Bye
2

First round
(Libya) Al Ahly Benghazi	0	2	2
(Tunisia) Espérance de Tunis	0	3	3

Preliminary round
1	(Chad) Gazelle	—	—	w/o
4	(Djibouti) GR/SIAF	—	—
3	(Egypt) Zamalek	Bye
2

First round
(Chad) Gazelle	—	—
(Egypt) Zamalek	—	—	w/o

Preliminary round
1	(Zambia) Forest Rangers	0	0	0
4	(Gabon) AS Bouenguidi	0	2	2
3	(Democratic Republic of the Congo) TP Mazembe	Bye
2

First round
(Gabon) AS Bouenguidi	1	1	2
(Democratic Republic of the Congo) TP Mazembe	2	2	4

Preliminary round
1	(Botswana) Jwaneng Galaxy	4	1	5
4	(Comoros) US Zilimadjou	0	1	1
3	(South Africa) Mamelodi Sundowns	Bye
2

First round
(Botswana) Jwaneng Galaxy	0	1	1
(South Africa) Mamelodi Sundowns	2	3	5

Preliminary round
1	(Eswatini) Young Buffaloes (a)	0	1	1
4	(Burundi) Le Messager Ngozi	0	1	1
3	(Democratic Republic of the Congo) AS Vita Club	Bye
2

First round
(Eswatini) Young Buffaloes	2	1	3
(Democratic Republic of the Congo) AS Vita Club	2	4	6

Preliminary round
1	(Cameroon) PWD Bamenda	0	0	0
4	(South Africa) Kaizer Chiefs	1	0	1
3	(Angola) 1º de Agosto	Bye
2

First round
(South Africa) Kaizer Chiefs	0	1	1
(Angola) 1º de Agosto	0	0	0

Preliminary round
1	(Republic of the Congo) AS Otohô	1	0	1
4	(Sudan) Al Merrikh	1	2	3
3	(Burkina Faso) Rahimo	0	1	1
2	(Nigeria) Enyimba	1	1	2

First round
(Sudan) Al Merrikh	3	1	4
(Nigeria) Enyimba	0	2	2

Preliminary round
1	(Mauritania) FC Nouadhibou	1	0	1
4	(Ghana) Asante Kotoko	1	2 (awd.)	3
3	(Uganda) Vipers	0	0	0
2	(Sudan) Al Hilal	1	1	2

First round
(Ghana) Asante Kotoko	0	0	0
(Sudan) Al Hilal	1	2 (awd.)	3

Preliminary round
1	(Benin) Buffles du Borgou	1	1	2
4	(Algeria) MC Alger	1	5	6
3	(Zanzibar) Mlandege	0	1	1
2	(Tunisia) CS Sfaxien	5	3	8

First round
(Algeria) MC Alger	2	0	2
(Tunisia) CS Sfaxien	0	1	1

Preliminary round
1	(Lesotho) Bantu	0	0	0
4	(Zambia) Nkana	1	0	1
3	(Equatorial Guinea) Akonangui	0	2	2
2	(Angola) Petro de Luanda	1	2	3

First round
(Zambia) Nkana	1	0	1
(Angola) Petro de Luanda	1	1	2

Preliminary round
1	(Mozambique) Costa do Sol	1	0	1
4	(Zimbabwe) FC Platinum	2	2	4
3	(Nigeria) Plateau United	0	0	0
2	(Tanzania) Simba	1	0	1

First round
(Zimbabwe) FC Platinum	1	0	1
(Tanzania) Simba	0	4	4

Preliminary round
1	(Algeria) CR Belouizdad	2	2	4
4	(Libya) Al Nasr	0	0	0
3	(Rwanda) APR	2	1	3
2	(Kenya) Gor Mahia	1	3	4

First round
(Algeria) CR Belouizdad	6	2	8
(Kenya) Gor Mahia	0	1	1

== Preliminary round ==
The preliminary round, also called the first preliminary round, included the 44 teams that did not receive byes to the first round.

Team 1	Agg.	Team 2	1st leg	2nd leg
Ashanti de Siguiri (Guinea)	1–4	(Mali) Stade Malien	1–2	0–2 (awd.) (Note: The preliminary round second leg match between Ashanti de Siguiri and Stade Malien could not be played after 4 of the 17 players from Ashanti de Siguiri tested positive for COVID-19. Thus, Ashanti de Siguiri were not able to name the required 15 players for holding the match, and subsequently, Stade Malien were awarded a technical 2–0 victory for the second leg by CAF in accordance with the regulations related to COVID-19.)
Gambia Armed Forces (The Gambia)	1–3	(Senegal) Teungueth	1–1	0–2
RC Abidjan (Ivory Coast)	2–2 (a)	(Togo) ASKO Kara	1–0	1–2
AS SONIDEP (Niger)	4–0	(Somalia) Mogadishu City	2–0	2–0
Al Ahly Benghazi (Libya)	w/o (Note: Al Ahly Benghazi won on walkover after Mekelle 70 Enderta were not able to present themselves with 15 players (including 1 goalkeeper) for the first leg in Cairo citing the Tigray conflict.)	(Ethiopia) Mekelle 70 Enderta	—	—
Gazelle (Chad)	w/o (Note: Gazelle won on walkover after GR/SIAF failed to appear for the first leg in N'Djamena.)	(Djibouti) GR/SIAF	—	—
Forest Rangers (Zambia)	0–2	(Gabon) AS Bouenguidi	0–0	0–2
Jwaneng Galaxy (Botswana)	5–1	(Comoros) US Zilimadjou	4–0	1–1
Young Buffaloes (Eswatini)	1–1 (a)	(Burundi) Le Messager Ngozi	0–0	1–1
PWD Bamenda (Cameroon)	0–1	(South Africa) Kaizer Chiefs	0–1	0–0
AS Otohô (Republic of the Congo)	1–3	(Sudan) Al Merrikh	1–1	0–2
Rahimo (Burkina Faso)	1–2	(Nigeria) Enyimba	0–1	1–1
FC Nouadhibou (Mauritania)	1–3	(Ghana) Asante Kotoko	1–1	0–2 (awd.) (Note: The preliminary round second leg match between FC Nouadhibou and Asante Kotoko could not be played after 2 of the 16 players from FC Nouadhibou tested positive for COVID-19. Thus, FC Nouadhibou were not able to name the required 15 players for holding the match, and subsequently, Asante Kotoko were awarded a technical 2–0 victory for the second leg by CAF in accordance with the regulations related to COVID-19.)
Vipers (Uganda)	0–2	(Sudan) Al Hilal	0–1	0–1
Buffles du Borgou (Benin)	2–6	(Algeria) MC Alger	1–1	1–5
Mlandege (Zanzibar)	1–8	(Tunisia) CS Sfaxien	0–5	1–3
Bantu (Lesotho)	0–1	(Zambia) Nkana	0–1	0–0
Akonangui (Equatorial Guinea)	2–3	(Angola) Petro de Luanda	0–1	2–2
Costa do Sol (Mozambique)	1–4	(Zimbabwe) FC Platinum	1–2	0–2
Plateau United (Nigeria)	0–1	(Tanzania) Simba	0–1	0–0
CR Belouizdad (Algeria)	4–0	(Libya) Al Nasr	2–0	2–0
APR (Rwanda)	3–4	(Kenya) Gor Mahia	2–1	1–3

Notes:

29 November 2020
16:30 UTC+0

Ashanti de Siguiri (Guinea)	1–2	(Mali) Stade Malien
Diarra 79' (pen.)	Report	Coulibaly 22', 45'

Stade du 28 Septembre, Conakry
Referee: Raymond Coker (Sierra Leone)
5 December 2020
16:00 UTC+0

Stade Malien (Mali)	2–0 (awarded) (Note: The preliminary round second leg match between Ashanti de Siguiri and Stade Malien could not be played after 4 of the 17 players from Ashanti de Siguiri tested positive for COVID-19. Thus, Ashanti de Siguiri were not able to name the required 15 players for holding the match, and subsequently, Stade Malien were awarded a technical 2–0 victory for the second leg by CAF in accordance with the regulations related to COVID-19.)	(Guinea) Ashanti de Siguiri
	Report

Stade du 26 Mars, Bamako
Referee: Alioune Sow Sandigui (Senegal)

Stade Malien won 4–1 on aggregate.

29 November 2020
16:30 UTC+0

Gambia Armed Forces (The Gambia)	1–1	(Senegal) Teungueth
Joof 22'	Report	Niang 90'

Independence Stadium, Bakau
Referee: Gilberto dos Santos (Guinea-Bissau)
6 December 2020
17:00 UTC+0

Teungueth (Senegal)	2–0	(The Gambia) Gambia Armed Forces
Bassene 53'; Fall 81'	Report

Stade Lat-Dior, Thiès
Referee: George Rogers Jr (Liberia)

Teungueth won 3–1 on aggregate.

29 November 2020
16:00 UTC+0

RC Abidjan (Ivory Coast)	1–0	(Togo) ASKO Kara
Agbezudo 45' (o.g.)	Report

Stade National de la Côte d'Ivoire, Abidjan
Referee: Moussa Alou (Niger)
6 December 2020
15:30 UTC+0

ASKO Kara (Togo)	2–1	(Ivory Coast) RC Abidjan
Akaté 54'; Tchakei 90'	Report	Kouadio 4' (pen.)

Stade de Kégué, Lomé
Referee: Quadri Adebimpe (Nigeria)

2–2 on aggregate. RC Abidjan won on away goals.

29 November 2020
17:00 UTC+1

AS SONIDEP (Niger)	2–0	(Somalia) Mogadishu City
Inoussa 51'; Mourtala 65'	Report

Stade Général Seyni Kountché, Niamey
Referee: Vincent Kabore (Burkina Faso)
5 December 2020
17:00 UTC+3

Mogadishu City (Somalia)	0–2	(Niger) AS SONIDEP
	Report	Mourtala 5'; Mukhtar 36'

El Hadj Hassan Gouled Aptidon Stadium, Djibouti City (Djibouti) (Note: Teams from Somalia played their home matches outside the country due to security concerns from the ongoing civil war.)
Referee: James Alier Michael (South Sudan)

AS SONIDEP won 4–0 on aggregate.

28 November 2020
20:00 UTC+2

Al Ahly Benghazi (Libya)	Cancelled	(Ethiopia) Mekelle 70 Enderta
	Report

Petro Sport Stadium, Cairo (Egypt) (Note: Teams from Libya played their home matches outside the country due to security concerns from the ongoing civil war.)
5 December 2020
16:00 UTC+3

Mekelle 70 Enderta (Ethiopia)	Cancelled	(Libya) Al Ahly Benghazi
	Report

Addis Ababa National Stadium, Addis Ababa

Al Ahly Benghazi won on walkover after Mekelle 70 Enderta were not able to present themselves with 15 players (including 1 goalkeeper) for the first leg in Cairo citing the Tigray conflict.

29 November 2020
16:00 UTC+1

Gazelle (Chad)	Cancelled	(Djibouti) GR/SIAF
	Report

Stade Omnisports Idriss Mahamat Ouya, N'Djamena
4 December 2020
17:00 UTC+3

GR/SIAF (Djibouti)	Cancelled	(Chad) Gazelle
	Report

El Hadj Hassan Gouled Aptidon Stadium, Djibouti City

Gazelle won on walkover after GR/SIAF failed to appear for the first leg in N'Djamena.

28 November 2020
15:00 UTC+2

Forest Rangers (Zambia)	0–0	(Gabon) AS Bouenguidi
	Report

Levy Mwanawasa Stadium, Ndola
Referee: Brighton Chimene (Zimbabwe)
5 December 2020
15:30 UTC+1

AS Bouenguidi (Gabon)	2–0	(Zambia) Forest Rangers
Ndjave 47'; Aubiang 56'	Report

Stade Augustin Monédan de Sibang, Libreville
Referee: Pierre Kibingo (DR Congo)

AS Bouenguidi won 2–0 on aggregate.

28 November 2020
15:30 UTC+2

Jwaneng Galaxy (Botswana)	4–0	(Comoros) US Zilimadjou
Thatanyane 28'; Paeye 36'; Setsile 73'; Maswena 87'	Report

Lobatse Stadium, Lobatse
Referee: Audrick Nkole (Zambia)
6 December 2020
15:00 UTC+3

US Zilimadjou (Comoros)	1–1	(Botswana) Jwaneng Galaxy
Chamoune 78'	Report	Baruti 73'

Stade de Moroni, Moroni
Referee: Njaka Raharimanantsoa (Madagascar)

Jwaneng Galaxy won 5–1 on aggregate.

29 November 2020
13:00 UTC+2

Young Buffaloes (Eswatini)	0–0	(Burundi) Le Messager Ngozi
	Report

Mavuso Sports Centre, Manzini
Referee: Tshepo Gobagoba (Botswana)
6 December 2020
15:00 UTC+2

Le Messager Ngozi (Burundi)	1–1	(Eswatini) Young Buffaloes
Urasenga 39' (pen.)	Report	Maseko 15'

Urukundo Stadium, Ngozi
Referee: Omar Artan (Somalia)

1–1 on aggregate. Young Buffaloes won on away goals.

29 November 2020
15:00 UTC+1

PWD Bamenda (Cameroon)	0–1	(South Africa) Kaizer Chiefs
	Report	Mathoho 83'

Limbe Stadium, Limbe
Referee: Gauthier Mbina (Gabon)
5 December 2020
20:00 UTC+2

Kaizer Chiefs (South Africa)	0–0	(Cameroon) PWD Bamenda
	Report

FNB Stadium, Johannesburg
Referee: João Goma (Angola)

Kaizer Chiefs won 1–0 on aggregate.

29 November 2020
15:30 UTC+1

AS Otohô (Republic of the Congo)	1–1	(Sudan) Al Merrikh
Konté 90'	Report	Al-Tash 75'

Stade Omnisport Marien Ngouabi d'Owando, Owando
Referee: Antoine Essouma (Cameroon)
4 December 2020
15:00 UTC+2

Al Merrikh (Sudan)	2–0	(Republic of the Congo) AS Otohô
Wajdi 71'; Teiri 89'	Report

Al Hilal Stadium, Omdurman
Referee: Mashood Ssali (Uganda)

Al Merrikh won 3–1 on aggregate.

29 November 2020
16:00 UTC+0

Rahimo (Burkina Faso)	0–1	(Nigeria) Enyimba
	Report	Mbaoma 75'

Stade du 4 Août, Ouagadougou
Referee: Abdul Latif Qadiri (Ghana)
6 December 2020
16:00 UTC+1

Enyimba (Nigeria)	1–1	(Burkina Faso) Rahimo
Oladapo 60'	Report	Ware 75'

Enyimba International Stadium, Aba
Referee: Kouassi Biro (Ivory Coast)

Enyimba won 2–1 on aggregate.

29 November 2020
15:00 UTC+0

FC Nouadhibou (Mauritania)	1–1	(Ghana) Asante Kotoko
Tanjy 22' (pen.)	Report	Osman 6'

Stade Cheikha Ould Boïdiya, Nouadhibou
Referee: Gaoussou Kané (Mali)
6 December 2020
15:00 UTC+0

Asante Kotoko (Ghana)	2–0 (awarded) (Note: The preliminary round second leg match between FC Nouadhibou and Asante Kotoko could not be played after 2 of the 16 players from FC Nouadhibou tested positive for COVID-19. Thus, FC Nouadhibou were not able to name the required 15 players for holding the match, and subsequently, Asante Kotoko were awarded a technical 2–0 victory for the second leg by CAF in accordance with the regulations related to COVID-19.)	(Mauritania) FC Nouadhibou
	Report

Accra Sports Stadium, Accra
Referee: Komlanvi Aklassou (Togo)

Asante Kotoko won 3–1 on aggregate.

28 November 2020
16:00 UTC+3

Vipers (Uganda)	0–1	(Sudan) Al Hilal
	Report	Al-Shoala 26'

St. Mary's Stadium, Entebbe
Referee: Hassan Mohammed Hagi (Somalia)
6 December 2020
15:00 UTC+2

Al Hilal (Sudan)	1–0	(Uganda) Vipers
Aldai 63'	Report

Al Hilal Stadium, Omdurman
Referee: Thierry Nkurunziza (Burundi)

Al Hilal won 2–0 on aggregate.

28 November 2020
17:00 UTC+1

Buffles du Borgou (Benin)	1–1	(Algeria) MC Alger
Fehintola 71'	Report	Rebiaï 25'

Stade Charles de Gaulle, Porto-Novo
Referee: Patrick Tanguy Vlei (Ivory Coast)
19 December 2020 (Note: The MC Alger v Buffles du Borgou match, originally scheduled to be played on 5 December 2020, was postponed due to unavailability of direct flights from Benin to Algeria, which prevented Buffles du Borgou from appearing for the match in time. The match was later rescheduled to be played on 19 December 2020.)
20:45 UTC+1

MC Alger (Algeria)	5–1	(Benin) Buffles du Borgou
Djabou 6'; Abdelhafid 14', 72'; Frioui 82'; Bourdim 90+4'	Report	Ajayi 19'

Stade du 5 Juillet, Algiers
Referee: Mohamed Adel (Egypt)

MC Alger won 6–2 on aggregate.

28 November 2020
19:00 UTC+3

Mlandege (Zanzibar)	0–5	(Tunisia) CS Sfaxien
	Report	Eduwo 30'; Amamou 41'; Chaouat 56', 78', 84'

Amaan Stadium, Zanzibar City
Referee: Davies Omweno (Kenya)
5 December 2020
15:00 UTC+1

CS Sfaxien (Tunisia)	3–1	(Zanzibar) Mlandege
Kouakou 48'; Chaouat 71'; Eduwo 90'	Report	Mzee 68' (pen.)

Stade Taïeb Mhiri, Sfax
Referee: El Mabrouk Muhammad (Libya)

CS Sfaxien won 8–1 on aggregate.

29 November 2020
16:00 UTC+2

Bantu (Lesotho)	0–1	(Zambia) Nkana
	Report	Mbombo 13'

Setsoto Stadium, Maseru
Referee: Ishmael Chizinga (Malawi)
5 December 2020
15:00 UTC+2

Nkana (Zambia)	0–0	(Lesotho) Bantu
	Report

Nkana Stadium, Kitwe
Referee: Luxolo Badi (South Africa)

Nkana won 1–0 on aggregate.

29 November 2020
15:30 UTC+1

Akonangui (Equatorial Guinea)	0–1	(Angola) Petro de Luanda
	Report	Azulão 37'

Estadio de Ebibeyin, Ebebiyin
Referee: Juste Kokolo (Congo)
5 December 2020
17:00 UTC+1

Petro de Luanda (Angola)	2–2	(Equatorial Guinea) Akonangui
Azulão 25'; Yano 89'	Report	Lolín 51' (pen.), 70'

Estádio 11 de Novembro, Luanda
Referee: Retselisitsoe Molise (Lesotho)

Petro de Luanda won 3–2 on aggregate.

28 November 2020
15:30 UTC+2

Costa do Sol (Mozambique)	1–2	(Zimbabwe) FC Platinum
Mário 86'	Report	Kawondera 71'; Maguri 89'

Estádio do Zimpeto, Maputo
Referee: Keabetswe Dintwa (Botswana)
5 December 2020
15:00 UTC+2

FC Platinum (Zimbabwe)	2–0	(Mozambique) Costa do Sol
Stima 79'; Chikwende 90'	Report

National Sports Stadium, Harare
Referee: Derrick Kafuli (Zambia)

FC Platinum won 4–1 on aggregate.

29 November 2020
16:00 UTC+1

Plateau United (Nigeria)	0–1	(Tanzania) Simba
	Report	Chama 53'

New Jos Stadium, Jos
Referee: Gnama Aklesso (Togo)
5 December 2020
17:00 UTC+3

Simba (Tanzania)	0–0	(Nigeria) Plateau United
	Report

National Stadium, Dar es Salaam
Referee: Anthony Ogwayo (Kenya)

Simba won 1–0 on aggregate.

29 November 2020
17:00 UTC+1

CR Belouizdad (Algeria)	2–0	(Libya) Al Nasr
Koukpo 14'; Nessakh 60'	Report

Stade du 5 Juillet, Algiers
Referee: Jalal Jayed (Morocco)
6 December 2020
18:00 UTC+2

Al Nasr (Libya)	0–2	(Algeria) CR Belouizdad
	Report	Keddad 17'; Fakroun 90+3' (o.g.)

Petro Sport Stadium, Cairo (Egypt)
Referee: Naim Hosni (Tunisia)

CR Belouizdad won 4–0 on aggregate.

28 November 2020
15:00 UTC+2

APR (Rwanda)	2–1	(Kenya) Gor Mahia
Niyonzima 9'; Juma 61' (o.g.)	Report	Muguna 27'

Nyamirambo Regional Stadium, Kigali
Referee: Souleiman Ahmed Djama (Djibouti)
5 December 2020
16:00 UTC+3

Gor Mahia (Kenya)	3–1	(Rwanda) APR
Onyango 17'; Ochieng 90'; Kipkirui 90'	Report	Nsanzimfura 82'

Nyayo National Stadium, Nairobi
Referee: Mahmood Ismail (Sudan)

Gor Mahia won 4–3 on aggregate.

== First round ==
The first round, also called the second preliminary round, included 32 teams: the 10 teams that received byes to this round, and the 22 winners of the preliminary round.

Team 1	Agg.	Team 2	1st leg	2nd leg
Stade Malien (Mali)	1–3	(Morocco) Wydad AC	1–0	0–3
Teungueth (Senegal)	0–0 (3–1 p)	(Morocco) Raja Casablanca	0–0	0–0
RC Abidjan (Ivory Coast)	1–2	(Guinea) Horoya	1–1	0–1
AS SONIDEP (Niger)	0–5	(Egypt) Al Ahly	0–1	0–4
Al Ahly Benghazi (Libya)	2–3	(Tunisia) Espérance de Tunis	0–0	2–3
Gazelle (Chad)	w/o (Note: Gazelle failed to appear for the first leg in Cairo following disputes between the Ministry of Youth and Sports in the country and the Chadian Football Federation, which prevented the club from traveling to Egypt. As a result, Gazelle were disqualified from the competition by CAF, and Zamalek won on walkover.)	(Egypt) Zamalek	—	—
AS Bouenguidi (Gabon)	2–4	(Democratic Republic of the Congo) TP Mazembe	1–2	1–2
Jwaneng Galaxy (Botswana)	1–5	(South Africa) Mamelodi Sundowns	0–2	1–3
Young Buffaloes (Eswatini)	3–6	(Democratic Republic of the Congo) AS Vita Club	2–2	1–4
Kaizer Chiefs (South Africa)	1–0	(Angola) 1º de Agosto	0–0	1–0
Al Merrikh (Sudan)	4–2	(Nigeria) Enyimba	3–0	1–2
Asante Kotoko (Ghana)	0–3	(Sudan) Al Hilal	0–1	0–2 (awd.) (Note: The first round second leg match between Asante Kotoko and Al Hilal could not be played after 7 players from Asante Kotoko tested positive for COVID-19. Thus, Asante Kotoko were not able to name the required 15 players for holding the match, and subsequently, Al Hilal were awarded a technical 2–0 victory for the second leg by CAF in accordance with the regulations related to COVID-19.)
MC Alger (Algeria)	2–1	(Tunisia) CS Sfaxien	2–0	0–1
Nkana (Zambia)	1–2	(Angola) Petro de Luanda	1–1	0–1
FC Platinum (Zimbabwe)	1–4	(Tanzania) Simba	1–0	0–4
CR Belouizdad (Algeria)	8–1	(Kenya) Gor Mahia	6–0	2–1

Notes:

23 December 2020
16:00 UTC+0

Stade Malien (Mali)	1–0	(Morocco) Wydad AC
Coulibaly 58'	Report

Stade du 26 Mars, Bamako
Referee: Sekou Ahmed Touré (Guinea)
6 January 2021
17:00 UTC+1

Wydad AC (Morocco)	3–0	(Mali) Stade Malien
El Kaabi 43'; Ellafi 46', 64'	Report

Stade Mohammed V, Casablanca
Referee: Amin Omar (Egypt)

Wydad Casablanca won 3–1 on aggregate.

22 December 2020
17:00 UTC+0

Teungueth (Senegal)	0–0	(Morocco) Raja Casablanca
	Report

Stade Lat-Dior, Thiès
Referee: Boubou Traoré (Mali)
5 January 2021
19:00 UTC+1

Raja Casablanca (Morocco)	0–0	(Senegal) Teungueth
	Report
Penalties
Moutouali (penalty missed); Haddad (penalty missed); Sadaoui (penalty missed); El Wardi (penalty scored)	1–3	(penalty missed) Aboubakrine; (penalty scored) Ndoye; (penalty scored) Sarr; (penalty missed) B. Diop; (penalty scored) E. Diop

Stade Mohammed V, Casablanca
Referee: Lahlou Benbraham (Algeria)

0–0 on aggregate. Teungueth won 3–1 on penalties.

23 December 2020
16:00 UTC+0

RC Abidjan (Ivory Coast)	1–1	(Guinea) Horoya
Ballo 61'	Report	Nikiéma 36' (pen.)

Stade National de la Côte d'Ivoire, Abidjan
Referee: Kouassi Attiogbe (Togo)
6 January 2021
16:00 UTC+0

Horoya (Guinea)	1–0	(Ivory Coast) RC Abidjan
Sakin 52' (pen.)	Report

Stade du 28 Septembre, Conakry
Referee: Issa Sy (Senegal)

Horoya won 2–1 on aggregate.

23 December 2020
15:00 UTC+1

AS SONIDEP (Niger)	0–1	(Egypt) Al Ahly
	Report	Dieng 33'

Stade Général Seyni Kountché, Niamey
Referee: Daniel Laryea (Ghana)
5 January 2021
19:00 UTC+2

Al Ahly (Egypt)	4–0	(Niger) AS SONIDEP
Taher 13'; Soliman 37'; Benoun 67' (pen.); Kahraba 90+1'	Report

Al Salam Stadium, Cairo
Referee: Yousri Bouali (Tunisia)

Al Ahly won 5–0 on aggregate.

23 December 2020
18:00 UTC+2

Al Ahly Benghazi (Libya)	0–0	(Tunisia) Espérance de Tunis
	Report

Petro Sport Stadium, Cairo (Egypt)
Referee: Bamlak Tessema Weyesa (Ethiopia)
6 January 2021
15:00 UTC+1

Espérance de Tunis (Tunisia)	3–2	(Libya) Al Ahly Benghazi
Chaalali 15' (pen.); Ben Romdhane 63'; Marzouki 86'	Report	Alnaeli 60'; Alshaafi 76' (pen.)

Stade Hammadi Agrebi, Tunis
Referee: Mahmoud El Banna (Egypt)

Espérance de Tunis won 3–2 on aggregate.

23 December 2020
20:00 UTC+2

Gazelle (Chad)	Cancelled	(Egypt) Zamalek
	Report

Cairo Military Academy Stadium, Cairo (Egypt) (Note: The Gazelle v Zamalek match, originally scheduled to be played at Stade Omnisports Idriss Mahamat Ouya in N'Djamena, Chad, was moved to Cairo Military Academy Stadium in Cairo, Egypt, following request made by both clubs.)
Referee: Jean-Jacques Ndala Ngambo (DR Congo)
6 January 2021
19:30 UTC+2

Zamalek (Egypt)	Cancelled	(Chad) Gazelle
	Report

Petro Sport Stadium, Cairo

Zamalek won on walkover after Gazelle were disqualified by CAF for failing to appear for the first leg in Cairo.

23 December 2020
15:30 UTC+1

AS Bouenguidi (Gabon)	1–2	(Democratic Republic of the Congo) TP Mazembe
Aubiang 17'	Report	Ulimwengu 28', 63'

Stade Augustin Monédan de Sibang, Libreville
Referee: Messie Nkounkou (Congo)
6 January 2021
15:30 UTC+2

TP Mazembe (Democratic Republic of the Congo)	2–1	(Gabon) AS Bouenguidi
Ulimwengu 14'; Mwape 45'	Report	Boussougou 79'

Stade TP Mazembe, Lubumbashi
Referee: Blaise Ngwa (Cameroon)

TP Mazembe won 4–2 on aggregate.

22 December 2020
15:30 UTC+2

Jwaneng Galaxy (Botswana)	0–2	(South Africa) Mamelodi Sundowns
	Report	Mvala 10'; Shalulile 46'

Lobatse Stadium, Lobatse
Referee: Bernard Camille (Seychelles)
5 January 2021
18:00 UTC+2

Mamelodi Sundowns (South Africa)	3–1	(Botswana) Jwaneng Galaxy
Erasmus 38'; Mvala 67'; Morena 81'	Report	Sembowa 89'

Loftus Versfeld Stadium, Pretoria
Referee: Retselisitsoe Molise (Lesotho)

Mamelodi Sundowns won 5–1 on aggregate.

22 December 2020
15:00 UTC+2

Young Buffaloes (Eswatini)	2–2	(Democratic Republic of the Congo) AS Vita Club
Dlamini 44'; Matsebula 46'	Report	Mayele 86'; Tulengi 89' (pen.)

Mavuso Sports Centre, Manzini
Referee: Osiase Koto (Lesotho)
6 January 2021
15:30 UTC+1

AS Vita Club (Democratic Republic of the Congo)	4–1	(Eswatini) Young Buffaloes
Mayele 18'; Lilepo 75', 79'; Kalenda 88'	Report	Dlamini 83'

Stade des Martyrs, Kinshasa
Referee: Pierre Atcho (Gabon)

AS Vita Club won 6–3 on aggregate.

23 December 2020
18:00 UTC+2

Kaizer Chiefs (South Africa)	0–0	(Angola) 1º de Agosto
	Report

FNB Stadium, Johannesburg
Referee: Ibrahim Tsimanohitsy (Madagascar)
5 January 2021
16:00 UTC+1

1º de Agosto (Angola)	0–1	(South Africa) Kaizer Chiefs
	Report	Castro 41'

Estádio 11 de Novembro, Luanda
Referee: Brighton Chimene (Zimbabwe)

Kaizer Chiefs won 1–0 on aggregate.

23 December 2020
15:00 UTC+2

Al Merrikh (Sudan)	3–0	(Nigeria) Enyimba
Teiri 6', 44', 90'	Report

Al Hilal Stadium, Omdurman
Referee: Peter Waweru (Kenya)
6 January 2021
15:30 UTC+1

Enyimba (Nigeria)	2–1	(Sudan) Al Merrikh
Mbaoma 15', 50' (pen.)	Report	Teiri 8'

Enyimba International Stadium, Aba
Referee: Djindo Houngnandande (Benin)

Al Merrikh won 4–2 on aggregate.

23 December 2020
15:00 UTC+0

Asante Kotoko (Ghana)	0–1	(Sudan) Al Hilal
	Report	Bongonga 76'

Accra Sports Stadium, Accra
Referee: Bienvenu Sinko (Ivory Coast)
6 January 2021
15:00 UTC+2

Al Hilal (Sudan)	2–0 (awarded) (Note: The first round second leg match between Asante Kotoko and Al Hilal could not be played after 7 players from Asante Kotoko tested positive for COVID-19. Thus, Asante Kotoko were not able to name the required 15 players for holding the match, and subsequently, Al Hilal were awarded a technical 2–0 victory for the second leg by CAF in accordance with the regulations related to COVID-19.)	(Ghana) Asante Kotoko
	Report

Al Hilal Stadium, Omdurman
Referee: Louis Hakizimana (Rwanda)

Al Hilal won 3–0 on aggregate.

28 December 2020 (Note: The MC Alger v CS Sfaxien match, originally scheduled to be played on 22 or 23 December 2020, was rescheduled to be played on 28 December following the postponement of the preliminary round second leg match between MC Alger and Buffles du Borgou from 5 to 19 December 2020.)
20:45 UTC+1

MC Alger (Algeria)	2–0	(Tunisia) CS Sfaxien
Frioui 28', 34'	Report

Stade du 5 Juillet, Algiers
Referee: Samir Guezzaz (Morocco)
6 January 2021
16:00 UTC+1

CS Sfaxien (Tunisia)	1–0	(Algeria) MC Alger
Chaouat 45' (pen.)	Report

Stade Taïeb Mhiri, Sfax
Referee: Bakary Gassama (Gambia)

MC Alger won 2–1 on aggregate.

23 December 2020
15:00 UTC+2

Nkana (Zambia)	1–1	(Angola) Petro de Luanda
Chisala 58'	Report	Yano 90'

Nkana Stadium, Kitwe
Referee: Artur Adriano Alfinar (Mozambique)
6 January 2021
17:00 UTC+1

Petro de Luanda (Angola)	1–0	(Zambia) Nkana
Toni 77'	Report

Estádio 11 de Novembro, Luanda
Referee: Eric Otogo-Castane (Gabon)

Petro de Luanda won 2–1 on aggregate.

23 December 2020
15:00 UTC+2

FC Platinum (Zimbabwe)	1–0	(Tanzania) Simba
Chikwende 17'	Report

National Sports Stadium, Harare
Referee: Keabetswe Dintwa (Botswana)
6 January 2021
17:00 UTC+3

Simba (Tanzania)	4–0	(Zimbabwe) FC Platinum
Nyoni 38' (pen.); Kapombe 61'; Bocco 90'; Chama 90' (pen.)	Report

National Stadium, Dar es Salaam
Referee: Georges Gatogato (Burundi)

Simba won 4–1 on aggregate.

26 December 2020 (Note: The CR Belouizdad v Gor Mahia match, originally scheduled to be played on 23 December 2020, was rescheduled to be played on 26 December due to locked airspace in Kenya as a consequence of the COVID-19 pandemic in Kenya, which prevented Gor Mahia from traveling to Algeria in time of the original date.)
20:45 UTC+1

CR Belouizdad (Algeria)	6–0	(Kenya) Gor Mahia
Sayoud 6', 20', 52'; Belahouel 12'; Tabti 43'; Ngombo 68'	Report

Stade du 5 Juillet, Algiers
Referee: Sadok Selmi (Tunisia)
6 January 2021
15:00 UTC+3

Gor Mahia (Kenya)	1–2	(Algeria) CR Belouizdad
Ulimwengu 22'	Report	Sayoud 78'; Belharrane 83'

Nyayo National Stadium, Nairobi
Referee: Bernard Camille (Seychelles)

CR Belouizdad won 8–1 on aggregate.
