= 2020 CAF Champions League =

2020 CAF Champions League may refer to:

- 2019–20 CAF Champions League
- 2020–21 CAF Champions League
