= 2020 Champions League =

2020 Champions League may refer to:

== Football ==
- 2019–20 UEFA Champions League
- 2020–21 UEFA Champions League
- 2020 AFC Champions League
- 2019–20 CAF Champions League
- 2020–21 CAF Champions League
