= 2018 Niger Cup =

Tournament details
- Country: Niger

Final positions
- Champions: AS GNN

The 2018 Coupe nationale du Niger is the 43rd edition of the Coupe nationale du Niger, the knockout football competition of Niger.

== Round 1 ==
[May 20]

Entente FC (Dosso) lt Akokana FC d' Arlit (Agadez)

[May 22]

Representant de Zinder lt AS Université AM (Niamey)

AS Garde Nationale (Niamey) 5-0 Wombeye FC (Maradi)

AS Forces Armées Nigériennes (Niamey) lt US Gendarmerie Nationale (Niamey)

[May 23]

Soniantcha FC (Tillabery) lt Dan Gourmou (Tahoua)

Jangorzo FC (Maradi) 8-1 Espoir FC (Zinder)

Olympic FC (Niamey) 1-1 AS Douanes (Niamey) [3-4 pen]

Urana FC d' Arlit (Agadez) bt Arewa FC de Doutchi (Dosso)

AS Forage (Niamey) 1-4 Racing FC (Niamey)

Azzura FC (Zinder) 0-3 Sahel Sporting Club (Niamey)

[May 24]

Atlantique (Maradi) 0-3 ASN NIGELEC (Niamey)

AS ZAM (Niamey) bt AS Tsunami FTC (Niamey)

National Dendi (Dosso) 0-7 JS Tahoua

[May 25]

Nassara de Tessaoua (Maradi) 0-8 Nassara AC (Agadez)

[Jun 6]

Lantarki (Agadez) lt AS SONIDEP (Niamey)

Barka FC (Diffa) lt AS Police (Niamey)

== Round 2 ==
[Jun 10]

US Gendarmerie Nationale (Niamey) 0-1 Racing FC (Niamey)

[Jun 12]

AS Douanes (Niamey) 0-0 AS Police (Niamey) [4-5 pen]

AS SONIDEP (Niamey) 2-1 AS ZAM (Niamey)

[Jun 13]

Urana FC d' Arlit (Agadez) drw AS Université AM (Niamey) [AS Université on pen]

Nassara AC (Agadez) 1-3 Jangorzo FC (Maradi)

[Jun 16]

JS Tahoua 0-1 Sahel Sporting Club (Niamey)

ASN NIGELEC (Niamey) 2-1 Dan Gourmou (Tahoua)

[Jun 17]

AS Garde Nationale (Niamey) 2-1 Akokana FC d' Arlit (Agadez)

== Quarterfinals ==
[Jul 7]

AS Garde Nationale (Niamey) 2-1 AS SONIDEP (Niamey)

[Jul 8]

AS Université AM (Niamey) 0-2 Racing FC (Niamey)

Sahel Sporting Club (Niamey) 1-3 Jangorzo FC (Maradi)

[Jul 10]

ASN NIGELEC (Niamey) drw AS Police (Niamey) [5-3 pen]

== Semifinals ==
First leg

[Jul 15]

Jangorzo FC (Maradi) 2-3 Racing FC (Niamey)

[Jul 19]

ASN NIGELEC (Niamey) 0-1 AS Garde Nationale (Niamey)

Second leg

[Jul 22]

AS Garde Nationale (Niamey) 2-0 ASN NIGELEC (Niamey) [3-0 agg]

[Jul 26]

Racing FC (Niamey) 2-1 Jangorzo FC (Maradi) [5-3 agg]

== Final ==
[Aug 3, Stade Régional, Maradi]

AS Garde Nationale (Niamey) 0-0 Racing FC (Niamey) [5-4 pen]

== See also ==
- 2017–18 Niger Premier League
