= Super Ligue (Niger) =

Top-level football league in Niger

- Founded: 1966
- Country: Niger
- Confederation: CAF
- Number of clubs: 16
- Level on pyramid: 1
- Relegation to: Ligue Nationale
- Domestic cup: Niger Cup
- International cup(s): Champions League; Confederation Cup
- Current champions: ASN Nigelec (2025–26)
- Most championships: Sahel SC (13)
- Current: 2026–27 Super Ligue

The Super Ligue is the top division of football in Niger. There are 14 teams competing in the league, which operates on a system of promotion and relegation with the Ligue Nationale.

The league began in 1966, with Secteur 6 winning the first five championships. It was known as the Ligue 1 between 2010 and 2018, when it changed its name to Super Ligue.

== History ==
Although the championship has been contested since 1966, the structure has changed over time, and a number of years the competition has been canceled or shortened. In 2002, the league was completely cancelled.

Several major clubs dropped out in 2004 and 2005 for financial reasons and because of the 2005 famine afflicting the south center of the nation. In 2004, for instance, three clubs in the first round were disqualified, and more than two dozen matches were annulled or awarded after the fact for a variety of offences.

Since the 1990s, the clubs compete in a group stage, the winners of which advance to the "Super League" which contests the second half of the season, with the losers contesting a league to determine what clubs will be relegated to the Regional leagues. The Leagues in each of the Nigerien regions (called the Nigerien D2 Championships) then send champions to a play-off to determine which two clubs will be promoted.

Historically, Niamey has had the most accomplished regional league, and has provided most clubs in the national championship. Only two clubs from outside Niamey have ever won the championship. The Ligue de Niamey has been powerful enough that, after disputes over relegation on 2000, five Niamey clubs formed their own rival competition (the "Coupe des Sponsors"), and played only the Ligue de Niamey championship in the 2002 season, when the Nigerien Football Federation cancelled the season due to funding shortfalls.

== 2021−22 Super Ligue teams ==
Team	Location	Stadium	Capacity
Akokana FC	Arlit	Stade d'Arlit	7,000
AS Douanes	Niamey	Stade Général Seyni Kountché	50,000
AS Forces Armées	Niamey	Stade du Camp Bagagi Iya	5,000
AS GNN	Niamey	Stade Général Seyni Kountché	50,000
AS Police	Niamey	Stade Général Seyni Kountché	50,000
AS SONIDEP	Niamey	Stade municipal de Niamey	5,000
ASN Nigelec	Niamey	Stade Général Seyni Kountché	50,000
Espoir FC	Zinder	Stade de Zinder	10,000
JS Tahoua	Tahoua	Stade Régional de Tahoua	5,000
Olympic Niamey	Niamey	Stade Général Seyni Kountché	50,000
RC Boukoki	Niamey	Stade Général Seyni Kountché	50,000
Sahel SC	Niamey	Stade Général Seyni Kountché	50,000
Urana FC	Arlit	Stade d'Arlit	7,000
US Gendarmerie Nationale	Niamey	Stade Général Seyni Kountché	50,000

== Standings 2023-24 ==
The final 2023-24 Super Ligue standings:

#	Football club	Pts	Extra
1	AS GNN	73	Champions
2	AS FAN	70	
3	ASN NIGELEC	61	
4	AS Douanes	54	
5	US GN	50	
6	Sahel SC	45	
7	AS Police	42	
8	Urana FC	39	
9	Jangorzo FC	37	
10	AS Renaissance	36	
11	Olympic FC	35	
12	Espoir FC	33	
13	JS Tahoua	33	
14	Liberté FC	31	
15	Zumunta AC	30	Relegated
16	Tagour PC	29	Relegated
17	Akokana FC	24	Relegated

== Previous champions ==
Years	Champions
1966	Olympic (1)
1967	Olympic (2)
1968	Olympic (3)
1969	Olympic (4)
1970	Olympic (5)
1971	AS FAN (1)
1972	Not held
1973	Sahel SC (1)
1974	Sahel SC (2)
1975	AS FAN (2)
1976	Olympic (6)
1977	Olympic (7)
1978	Olympic (8)
1979	Not held
1980	AS Niamey (1)
1981	AS Niamey (2)
1982	AS Niamey (3)
1983	Jangorzo (1)
1984	Espoir (1)
1985	Zumunta AC (1)
1986	Sahel SC (3)
1987	Sahel SC (4)
1988	Zumunta AC (2)
1989	Olympic (9)
1990	Sahel SC (5)
1991	Sahel SC (6)
1992	Sahel SC (7)
1993	Zumunta AC (3)
1994	Sahel SC (8)
1995	Not held
1996	Sahel SC (9)
1997–98	Olympic (10)
1999	Olympic (11)
2000	JS Ténéré (1)
2001	JS Ténéré (2)
2002	Not held
2003	Sahel SC (10)
2004	Sahel SC (11)
2005	AS GNN (1)
2006	AS GNN (2)
2007	Sahel SC (12)
2008	AS Police (1)
2009	Sahel SC (13)
2010	AS FAN (3)
2010–11	AS GNN (3)
2011–12	Olympic (12)
2012–13	Douanes (1)
2013–14	AS GNN (4)
2014–15	Douanes (2)
2015–16	AS FAN (4)
2016–17	AS FAN (5)
2017–18	AS SONIDEP (1)
2018–19	AS SONIDEP (2)
2019–2020	Not held due to COVID-19
2020–21	US Gendarmerie Nationale (1)
2021–22	ASN Nigelec FC (1)
2022–23	AS GNN (5)
2023–24	AS GNN (6)
2024–25	AS FAN (6)
2025–26	ASN Nigelec FC (2)

== Qualification for CAF competitions ==
=== Association ranking for the 2025–26 CAF club season ===
The association ranking for the 2025–26 CAF Champions League and the 2025–26 CAF Confederation Cup will be based on results from each CAF club competition from 2020–21 to the 2024–25 season.

Legend

- CL: CAF Champions League
- CC: CAF Confederation Cup
- ≥: Associations points might increase on basis of its clubs performance in 2024–25 CAF club competitions
- Associations ranked 1–12 are eligible to enter two teams in each CAF club competition.

Rank			Association	2020–21 (× 1)		2021–22 (× 2)		2022–23 (× 3)		2023–24 (× 4)		2024–25 (× 5)		Total
2025	2024	Mvt	Association	CL	CC	CL	CC	CL	CC	CL	CC	CL	CC	Total
1	1	—	Egypt	8	3	7	4	8	2.5	7	7	10	4	190.5
2	2	—	Morocco	4	6	9	5	8	2	2	4	5	5	142
3	4	+1	South Africa	8	2	5	4	4	3	4	1.5	9	3	131
4	3	-1	Algeria	6	5	7	1	6	5	2	3	5	5	130
5	6	+1	Tanzania	3	0.5	0	2	3	4	6	0	2	4	82.5
6	5	-1	Tunisia	4	3	5	1	4	2	6	1	3	0.5	82.5
7	8	+1	Angola	1	0	5	0	2	0	3	1.5	2	2	55
8	7	-1	DR Congo	4	0	0	3	1	2	4	0	2	0	45
9	9	—	Sudan	3	0	3	0	3	0	2	0	3	0	41
10	11	+1	Ivory Coast	0	0	0	1	0	3	3	0	1	2	38
11	10	-1	Libya	0	0.5	0	5	0	0.5	0	3	0	0	24
12	12	—	Nigeria	0	2	0	0	0	2	0	2	0	1	21
13	15	+2	Mali	0	0	0	0	0	1	0	2	1	0.5	18.5
14	14	—	Ghana	0	0	0	0	0	0	1	3	0	0	16
15	13	-2	Guinea	2	0	1	0	2	0	0	0.5	0	0	12
16	19	+3	Botswana	0	0	1	0	0	0	1	0	0	0.5	8.5
17	21	+4	Senegal	1	2	0	0	0	0	0	0	0	1	8
18	17	-1	Mauritania	0	0	0	0	0	0	2	0	0	0	8
19	18	-1	Congo	0	0	0	1	0	1	0	0.5	0	0	7
20	16	-4	Cameroon	0	3	0	0.5	1	0	0	0	0	0	7
21	22	+1	Togo	0	0	0	0	0	1	0	0	0	0	3
22	22	—	Uganda	0	0	0	0	1	0	0	0	0	0	3
23	-	new	Mozambique	0	0	0	0	0	0	0	0	0	0.5	2.5
24	20	-4	Zambia	0	1.5	0	0.5	0	0	0	0	0	0	2.5
25	24	-1	Eswatini	0	0	0	0.5	0	0	0	0	0	0	1
25	24	-1	Niger	0	0	0	0.5	0	0	0	0	0	0	1
27	26	-1	Burkina Faso	0	0.5	0	0	0	0	0	0	0	0	0.5

== Performance by club ==
Club	Titles	Winning seasons
Sahel SC	13	1973, 1974, 1986, 1987, 1990, 1991, 1992, 1994, 1996, 2003, 2004, 2006–07, 2009
Olympic FC	12	1966, 1967, 1968, 1969, 1970, 1976, 1977, 1978, 1989, 1997–98, 1999, 2011–12
ASGNN	6	2004–05, 2005–06, 2010–11, 2013–14, 2022–23, 2023–24
AS FAN	6	1971, 1975, 2010, 2015–16, 2016–17, 2024-25
AS Niamey	3	1980, 1981, 1982
Zumunta AC	3	1985, 1988, 1993
AS Douanes	2	2012–13, 2014–15
AS SONIDEP	2	2017–18, 2018–19
JS du Ténéré	2	2000, 2001
Espoir FC	1	1984
Jangorzo FC	1	1983
AS Police	1	2008
US Gendarmerie Nationale	1	2020–21
ASN Nigelec	1	2021–22

== Top goalscorers ==
Season	Player	Team	Goals
2023–24	(Niger) Victorien Adebayor	AS GNN	22
2024-25	(Ghana) Elvis Bernard Addae	AS FAN	15
2025-26	Osman Ibrahim	Douanes	17

=== Multiple hat-tricks ===
Rank	Country	Player	Hat-tricks
1	(Niger)	Victorien Adebayor	2
