= AS Niamey =

Nigerien football club

- Full name: Association Sportive Niamey
- Ground: Stade Général Seyni Kountché; Niamey, Niger
- Capacity: 50,000
- League: Niger Premier League

Association Sportive Niamey, commonly referred to as AS Niamey, is a Nigerien association football club based in Niamey. AS Niamey has won the Niger Premier League three times in his history .

== Stadium ==
Currently the team plays at the 30000 capacity Stade Général Seyni Kountché.

== Performance in CAF competitions ==
- CAF Champions League: 1 appearance

2003 – First Round

== Honours ==
- Niger Premier League
  - Champions (3): 1980, 1981, 1982

== See also ==
- CAF Champions League 2003
