= Alkali Nassara Club =

Nigerien football club

- Full name: Alkali Nassara Club
- Founded: 1983
- Ground: Stade de Zinder
- Capacity: 10,000
- League: Niger Premier League
| Home colours | Away colours |

Alkali Nassara Club is a Nigerien football club based in Zinder, a town approximately 14 hours east of the capital Niamey. The team competes in the Niger Premier League.
