= Djibrilla Hima Hamidou =

Nigerien football official

Djibrilla Hima Hamidou (born 7 March 1965) is a Nigerien military officer and football official. He is known as "Pelé".

== Early life ==
Djibrilla Hima Hamidou was born in Niamey and belongs to the Zarma ethnic group.

== Career ==
In 1999, he was linked to the 1999 Nigerien coup d'état. He was also Spokesperson of the National Reconciliation Council of Niger, a military junta.

In 2013, Hamidou was re-elected President of the Federation of Nigerien Football for a four-year term.

In 2023, he was reportedly one of the leaders of the 2023 Nigerien coup d'état.

In 2024, he was appointed to the FIFA Council.
