= Ibrahim Tankary =

Nigerien footballer

Ibrahim Tankary (born 24 March 1972) is a Nigerien football striker. He currently plays for Rusas Foot.

== Career ==
Tankary arrived at Zulte-Waregem in the summer of 2004 from FC Brussels. He had previously played for Sint-Truidense in the Jupiler League (on loan from Zulte-Waregem) and Lommel, a now defunct club replaced by KVSK United. He left in August 2008 K. Londerzeel S.K. and signed for Rusas Foot.

== International ==
Tankary played for Niger, but also holds a Belgian nationality.
