= Mohamed Chamoune =

Comorian footballer

Personal information
- Full name: Mohamed Anoir Chamoune
- Date of birth: 6 November 1994 (age 32)
- Place of birth: Comoros
- Position: Defender

Team information
- Current team: Volcan Club

Senior career*
Years	Team	Apps	(Gls)
2018–2021	Zilimadjou		
2021–	Volcan Club		

International career
2021–	Comoros	1	(0)
- * Club domestic league appearances and goals as of 00:12, 17 June 2021 (UTC)

Mohamed Anoir Chamoune (born 6 November 1994) is a Comorian footballer who plays as a defender for Volcan Club and the Comoros national team.

== International career ==
Chamoune made his senior international debut for Comoros in a 2021 FIFA Arab Cup qualification match against Palestine, a 5–1 defeat.
