= Dan Kassawa FC =

Football club in niger

- Full name: Dan Kassawa Football Club
- Founded: 2008
- Ground: Stade de Maradi; Maradi, Niger
- Capacity: 10,000
- League: Niger Premier League
| Home colours | Away colours |

Dan Kassawa FC is a Nigerien football club based in Maradi, Niger. The club was formed in 2008 and plays in Niger Premier League.

== Stadium ==
The team currently plays at Stade de Maradi, which holds 10,000 people.

== Performance in CAF competitions ==
- 2011 WAFU Club Championship: 1 appearance
