= JS du Ténéré =

Nigerien football club

- Full name: Jeunesse Sportive du Ténéré
- Ground: Général Seyni Kountché Stadion; Niamey, Niger
- Capacity: 50,000
- League: Niger Premier League

JS du Ténéré is a Nigerien football club based in Niamey. Their home games are played at the Stade Général Seyni Kountché.

== Achievements ==
- Niger Premier League: 2

2000, 2001

- Niger Cup: 4

1997, 1998, 1999, 2000

== Performance in CAF competitions ==
- CAF Champions League: 1 appearance

2001 – First Round

- CAF Cup Winners' Cup: 1 appearance

2000 – Quarter-Finals
