= Niger Cup =

- Founded: 1974; 52 years ago
- Region: Niger
- Current champions: AS NIGELEC (2nd title)
- Most championships: Sahel (12 titles)
- 2025 Niger Cup

The Niger Cup (Coupe nationale du Niger) is the national football competition, on a knock-out-basis in Niger. It was founded in 1974. The most successful club is Sahel with 12 titles.

== Niger Cup Finals ==
Season	Winner	Score	Runner-up
1974	Sahel	3–0	Magaria
1975	Olympic	2–1	Tessaoua
1976	Liberté	2–1	Espoir
1977	Olympic	4–2	Espoir
1978	Sahel	4–3	Espoir
1979	AS Niamey	5–1	AS Tahoua
1980	AS Niamey	1–0	AS Zinder
1981	AS Niamey	3–0	Maradi
1982	Zindourma	2–1	AS Niamey
1983	Jangorzo	3–3 (4–3 pen.)	Olympic
1984	Espoir	1–0	Liberté
1985	Espoir	1–1 (6–5 pen.)	Olympic
1986	Sahel	2–0	Yadio
1987	Liberté	2–0	Ader
1988	Liberté	1–1 (6–5 pen.)	Ader
1989	Liberté	2–1	Ader
1990	Olympic	1–0	Liberté
1991	Olympic	0–0 (4–3 pen.)	Sahel
1992	Sahel	2–1	Olympic
1993	Sahel	2–1	Olympic
1994	Zumunta	3–1	Espoir
1995	ASFAN	3–1	Liberté
1996	Sahel	3–2	JS Ténéré
1997	JS Ténéré	6–2	Jangorzo
1998	JS Ténéré	4–0	Liberté
1999	JS Ténéré	2–0	Sahel
2000	JS Ténéré	3–1	Olympic
2001	Akokana	1–1 (5–4 pen.)	Jangorzo
2002	not held		
2003	Olympic	4–1	Alkali Nassara
2004	Sahel	2–1	Akokana
2005	tournament abandoned		
2006	Sahel	3–0	ASFAN
2007	AS-FNIS	3–0	Espoir de Zinde
2008	AS Police	2–0	Akokana
2009	ASFAN	1–0	AS-FNIS
2010	ASFAN	2–1	AS GNN
2011	Sahel	1–0	Jangorzo
2012	Sahel	2–1	Urana
2013	AS NIGELEC	1–0	Akokana
2014	Sahel	3–0	US GN
2015	AS SONIDEP	1–0	US GN
2016	AS Douanes	1–1 (4–3 pen.)	Akokana
2017	Sahel	0–0 (3–0 pen.)	AS SONIDEP
2018	AS GNN	0–0 (5–4 pen.)	Racing
2019	AS SONIDEP	1–0	US GN
2020	tournament abandoned		
2021	US GN	1–1 (4–3 pen.)	AS Police
2022	AS Douanes	1–1 (4–3 pen.)	US GN
2023	AS GNN	1–1 (5–4 pen.)	AS Douanes
2024	ASFAN	1–0	US GN
2025	AS NIGELEC	0–0 (4–3 pen.)	AS Douanes

== Performance by club ==
Club	Winners	Runners-up
Sahel	12	2
Olympic	5	5
Liberté	4	4
JS Ténéré	4	1
ASFAN	4	1
AS GNN	3	2
AS Niamey	3	1
Espoir	2	5
AS SONIDEP	2	1
AS Douanes	2	2
AS NIGELEC	2	-
US GN	1	5
Akokana	1	4
Jangorzo	1	3
AS Police	1	1
Zindourma	1	-
Zumunta	1	-
Ader	-	3
Alkali Nassara	-	1
Magaria	-	1
Maradi	-	1
Racing	-	1
AS Tahoua	-	1
Tessaoua	-	1
Urana	-	1
Yadio	-	1
AS Zinder	-	1
