= 2018–19 Benin Premier League =

Benin Premier League
- Season: 2018–19

The 2018–19 Benin Premier League is the 41st season of the Benin Premier League, the top-tier football league in Benin. The season started on 27 October 2018.

== Standings ==
Final table.

 1.Buffles du Borgou de Parakou (Borgou)       34  19  8  7  31-12  65  Champions
 2.Béké FC (Bembereke)                         34  17 10  7  44-25  61
 3.AS Tonnerre FC                              34  14 11  9  30-20  53
 4.Panthères de Djougou                        34  14  8 12  42-40  50
 5.Ayéma d'Adjarra FC                          34  13  9 12  34-29  48
 6.ASPAC (Cotonou)                             34  13  8 13  28-31  47
 7.Dragons de l'Ouémé FC                       34  13  7 14  37-37  46
 8.ESAE (Cotonou)                              34  12 10 12  25-26  46
 9.ASVO FC (Adjohoun)                          34  11 12 11  24-22  45
10.JA Cotonou                                  34  10 15  9  26-25  45
11.Jeunesse Sportive de Pobè FC                34  12  9 13  26-29  45
12.Union Sportive Sèmè Kraké                   34  10 14 10  22-24  44
13.Energie FC (Cotonou)                        34  10 13 11  28-27  43
14.UPI-ONM FC (Cotonou)                        34  12  7 15  29-42  43
----------------------------------------------------------------------
15.Avrankou Omnisport                          34  10 12 12  28-27  42  Relegated
16.AS Oussou Saka (Porto-Novo)                 34  10 11 13  27-34  41  Relegated
17.Dynamo FC d'Abomey                          34   9 11 14  32-37  38  Relegated
18.Soleil FC (Cotonou)                         34   7  5 22  29-55  26  Relegated
  -.AS Police                                   disqualified; all results annulled;
