= Stade d'Arlit =

Football stadium in Arlit, Niger

Coordinates: 18.7333°N 7.3833°E

- Interactive map of Stade d'Arlit
- Full name: Stade d'Arlit
- Location: Arlit, Niger
- Capacity: 7,000

Tenant
- Akokana F.C.

Stade d'Arlit is a multi-use stadium in Arlit, Niger. It is currently used mostly for football matches, on club level by Akokana F.C. of the Niger Premier League. The stadium has a capacity of 7,000 spectators.
