= Zumunta AC =

Nigerien football club

- Full name: Zumunta AC
- Ground: Général Seyni Kountché Stadion; Niamey, Niger
- Capacity: 50,000
- Chairman: Harouna Ansongo
- Manager: Ahmadou Gourma
- League: Niger League 2
- 2024–25: 4th, Group A
Home colours	Away colours

Zumunta AC is a Nigerien football club based in Niamey. Their home games are played at the Stade Général Seyni Kountché.

== Achievements ==
- Niger Premier League: 3

1985, 1988, 1993

- Niger Cup: 1

1994

== Performance in CAF competitions ==
- African Cup of Champions Clubs: 1 appearance

1994 – First Round

- CAF Cup: 2 appearances

1992 – First Round
1993 – Quarter-Finals

- CAF Cup Winners' Cup: 2 appearances

1978 – Preliminary Round
1995 – First Round

== Current squad ==
Note: Flags indicate national team as defined under FIFA eligibility rules; some limited exceptions apply. Players may hold more than one non-FIFA nationality.

No.	Pos.	Nation	Player
1	GK	NIG	Boubacar Sakho
2	DF	NIG	Assoumana Maidagi
