= Seyni Kountche Stadium =

Football stadium in Niamey, Niger

- SGSK
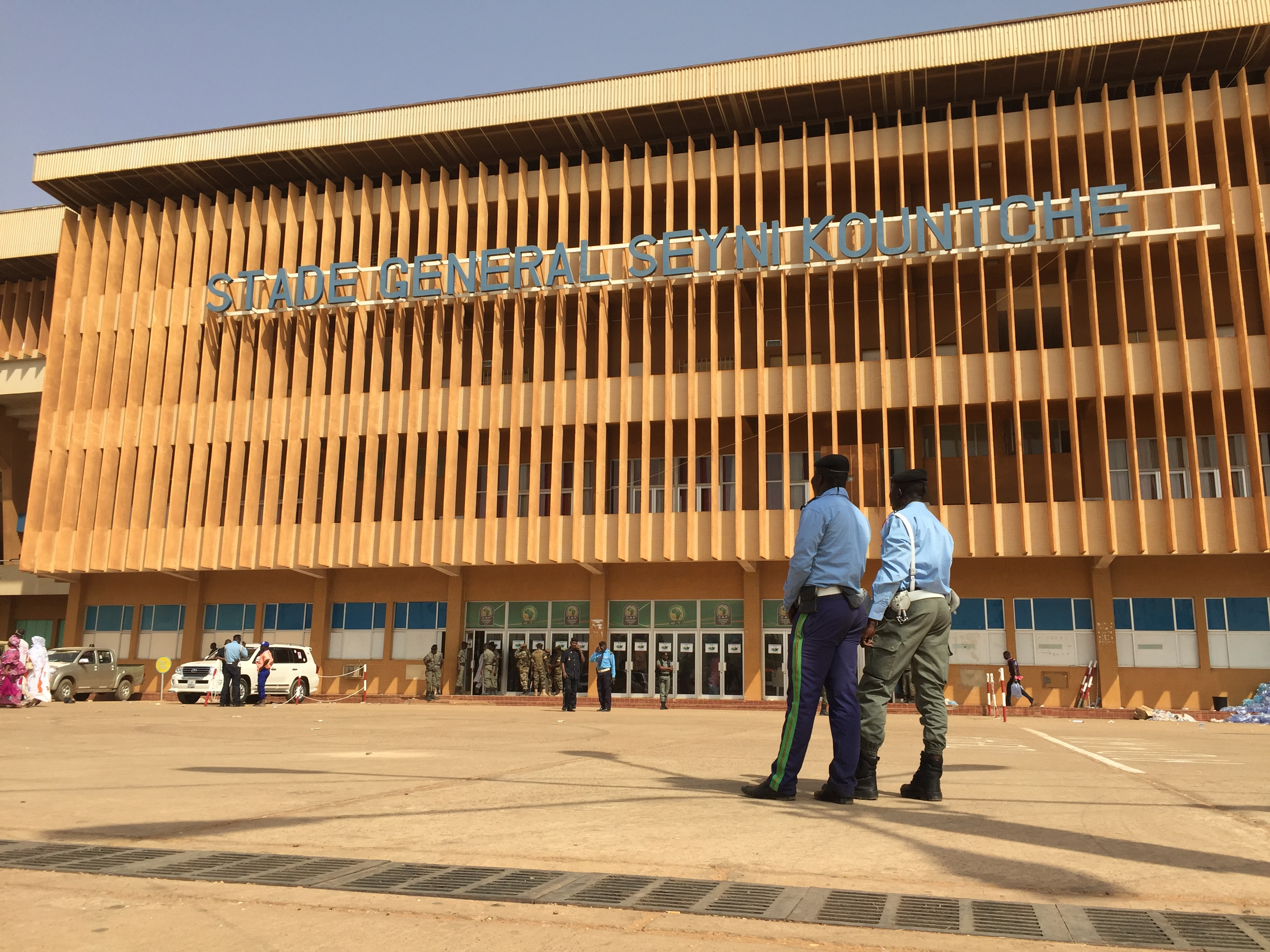
- Interactive map of Seyni Kountche Stadium
- Former names: Stade du 29 Juillet (-1987)
- Location: Boulevard du Zarmaganda & Avenue du Mali Bero; P.B. 11614; Niamey, Niger
- Coordinates: 13°31′38.1″N 2°06′32.3″E
- Owner: Government of Niger
- Operator: "Council of Stadium Administration"
- Capacity: 50,000
- Surface: Grass pitch, Track& field, indoor arenas

Construction
- Opened: 1989
- Renovated: 1999

Tenants
- Niger national football team Sahel SC; Olympic FC de Niamey; Zumunta AC; JS du Ténéré

Seyni Kountche Stadium is a multi-purpose stadium in Niamey, Niger. Used for football matches, it is home to the Niger national football team, as well as Niger Premier League clubs Sahel SC, Olympic FC de Niamey, Zumunta AC and JS du Ténéré, as well as club competitions such as the Niger Cup. The venue is also sometimes used for rugby union. It is the largest stadium in Niamey, followed by the 10,000-capacity Stade municipal.

== Overview ==
The stadium hosts both international athletics tournaments, and the finals of national athletics competitions. The stadium has an announced capacity of 35,000 people. It was named for the 1974-1987 military President of Niger Seyni Kountché following his death. Opened in 1989 on the site of the former Stade du 29 Juillet, it underwent a large Chinese government funded renovation and expansion into a multi-use complex in 1999. It is owned by the government of Niger, and operated by an appointed directorship and the "Council of Stadium Administration" ("Conseil d’Administration du Stade").

== Usage ==
The large athletic stadium is part of a larger multiuse complex which includes the Palais des Sports 3000 seat indoor arena, the Academy of Martial Arts of 2,000 seats, as well as performance spaces, thirty meeting rooms, and athletic training facilities. The complex includes facilities for track and field, Basketball, handball, and tennis. It has been the centrepoint of recent large cultural and sporting events such as the 2005 Jeux de la Francophonie and the 2009 first CEN-SAD Games. For large events such as these, the stadium is supplemented by local facilities such as the Stade Municipal de Niamey, Centre aéré de la BCEAO, the Nigerien Football Federation training centre, ASFAN's military stadium at Bagagi Iya army base, and fields at local institutions such as lycée La Fontaine (Niamey), the sports centre at Abdou Moumouni Dioffo University, and the fields at lycée technique Issa Béri. Near the stadium complex is the Niamey Racecourse (Hippodrome de Niamey) and the Niamey traditional sports arena, home to Nigerien Lutte Traditionnelle. The SGSK complex is regularly used for political events, exhibitions, and cultural activities.

== See also ==
- Football in Niger
- Lists of stadiums
