= Stade de Zinder =

Stadium in Zinder, Niger

Coordinates: 13°48′50″N 8°58′59″E

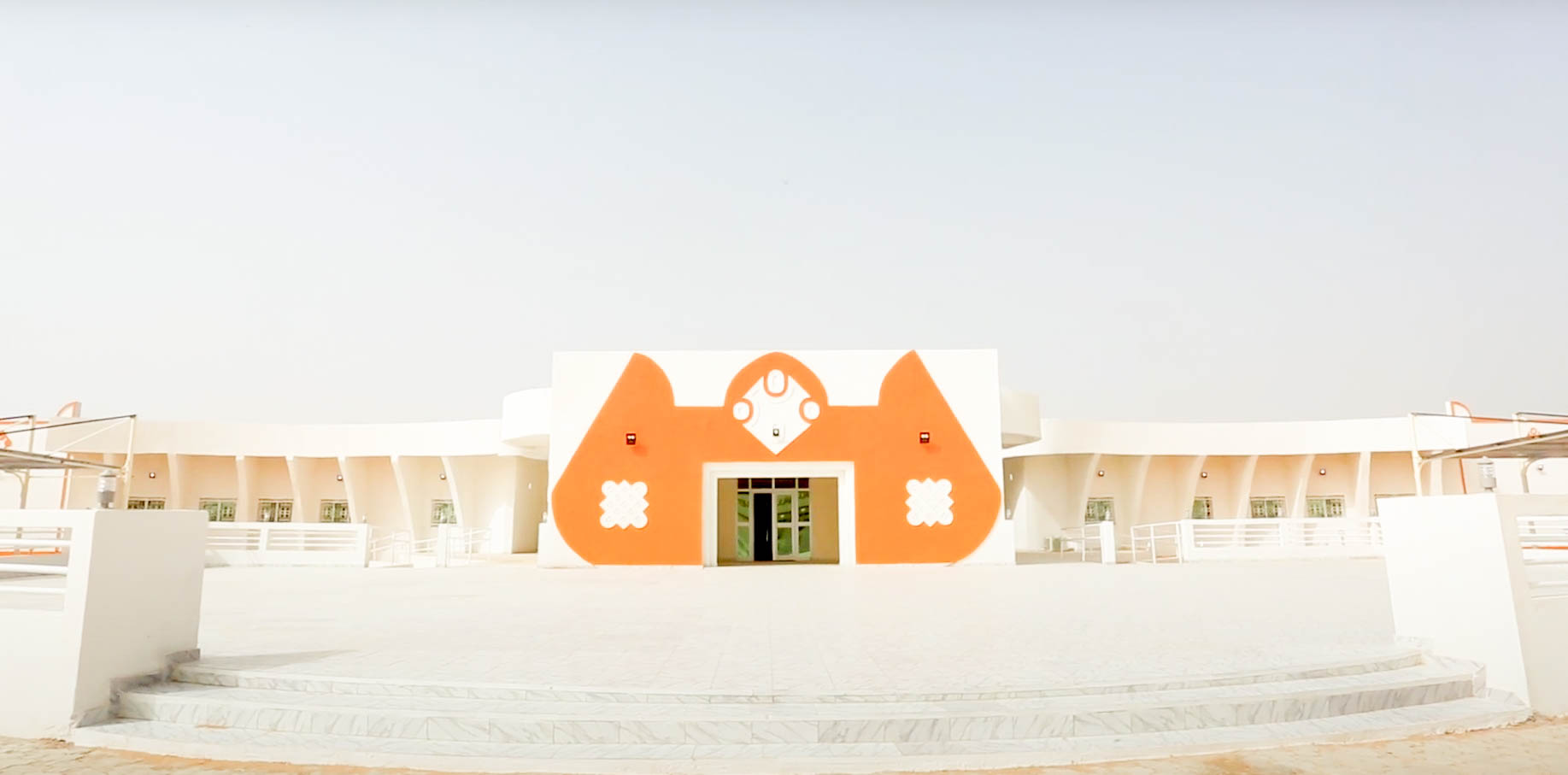
The front entrance of State de Zinder.

Stade municipal Lawandidi is a multi-use stadium in Zinder, Niger. It is currently used mostly for football matches and traditional wrestling, and serves as the home venue for Espoir FC. The stadium holds 10,000 people.

== See also ==
- Football in Niger
- Lists of stadiums
