= Espoir FC (Niger) =

Nigerien football club

- Full name: Espoir Football Club
- Ground: Stade de Zinder; Zinder, Niger
- Capacity: 10,000
- Chairman: Faroukou Jamaare
- Manager: Yahaya Kazaure
- League: Super Ligue
- 2025–26: 8th
Home colours	Away colours

Espoir FC is a Nigerien football club based in Zinder. Their home games are played at Stade de Zinder.

== Achievements ==
- Niger Premier League: 1

1984

- Niger Cup: 2

1984, 1985
