= AS FAN =

Association football club in Niger

- Full name: Association Sportive des Forces Armées Nigériennes
- Ground: Stade du Camp Bagagi Iya; Niamey, Niger
- Capacity: 5,000
- Chairman: Colonel Djibrilla Hima Hamidou "Pélé"
- Manager: Moussa Zamfara
- League: Niger Premier League
- 2025–26: 3rd
Home colours	Away colours

Association Sportive des Forces Armées Nigériennes, known simply AS FAN, is a Nigerien professional football club based in Niamey, which is operated by the Nigerien Armed Forces (the FAN). They play at the stade du camp Bagagi Iya, a small stadium in one of Niamey's military bases, although larger matches are played at the stade Général Seyni Kountché. Their current club president is Army Lieutenant Colonel Djibrilla Hima Hamidou (called Colonel "Pélé").

== History ==
ASFAN has won the Niger League Championship (today's Niger Premier League) six times, with their most recent win in 2024–25.

The club has reached the Coupe Nationale of Niger final only once: defeating Liberté FC 3–1 on 3 August 1995. From this win they qualified for the 1996 Coupe de l'Union des fédérations de football ouest-africaines (UFOA Cup). Reaching the final on 8 December 1996, ASFAN defeated East End Lions from Freetown, Sierra Leone, making them the only Nigerien football club to have won an international competition.

In 2009 they played in the Niger Premier League. They have entered the top national league every year since 2001, when they were one of fourteen clubs to boycott the championship over the relegation of Zumunta AC. In 2004 the championship was canceled.

Notable former players include Mâazou Ouwo, transferred in January 2008 to Sporting Lokeren in Belgium, who in 2009 moved to CSKA Moscow. ASFAN reportedly received 327 million FCFA for 2008 transfer fees.

In late 2008, they were chosen to compete in the 2009 African Confederation Cup in place of AS Police, who won both the Cup and League in 2008. As no system was previously in place, the Nigerien Football Federation chose 2008 League runners up ASFAN over Akokana Arlit, 2008 Cup finalists.

== Achievements ==
=== National ===
- Niger Premier League: 6

1971, 1975, 2010, 2016, 2017, 2025

- Niger Cup: 4

1995, 2009, 2010, 2024.

- Niger Super Cup: 3

2010, 2016, 2024.

=== Regional ===
- West African Club Championship: 1

1996.

== Performance in CAF competitions ==
- CAF Champions League: 4 appearances

2011 – Preliminary round
2017 – Preliminary round
2018 – Preliminary round
2025–26 – Preliminary round

- CAF Confederation Cup: 3 appearances

2009 – Preliminary round
2010 – Quarter-finals/Group stage
2024–25 – Preliminary round
