= Jangorzo FC =

Nigerien football club

- Full name: Jangorzo Football Club
- Ground: Stade de Maradi; Maradi, Niger
- Capacity: 7,000
- Chairman: Kabirou Borgou
- Manager: Ouada Gobir
- League: Second Division (II)
- 2024–25: ▼16th in Niger Premier League
Home colours

Jangorzo FC is a Nigerien football club based in Maradi. Their home games are played at Stade de Maradi.

== Achievements ==
- Niger Premier League: 1

1983

- Niger Cup: 1

1983
