= US GN =

Nigerien football club

- Full name: Union Sportive de la Gendarmerie Nationale
- Founded: 1996; 30 years ago
- Chairman: Hamidou Dosso
- Manager: Djibo Touré
- League: Super Ligue
- 2024–25: Super Ligue, 5th of 14

Union Sportive de la Gendarmerie Nationale is a Nigerien football club based in Niamey. It was founded in 1996, and competes in the Niger Premier League. In 2021, it won both the league and the cup, the first titles in the club's history.

== Stadium ==
The team plays its home matches at the 35,000 capacity Stade Général Seyni Kountché.

== Achievements ==
- Super Ligue: 1

2020–21

- Niger Cup: 1

2021

- Niger Super Cup: 0

== CAF competitions record ==
Last update: 24 February 2023

Season	Competition	Round	Club	Home	Away	Aggregate
2019–20	CAF Confederation Cup	PR	(Libya) Al-Ittihad	1–1	0–2	1–3
2020–21	CAF Confederation Cup	PR	(Mali) Yeelen Olympique	1–1	1–0	2–1
2020–21	CAF Confederation Cup	1R	(Algeria) JS Kabylie	1–2	2–0	1–4
2021–22	CAF Champions League	1R	(Burundi) Le Messager Ngozi	1–1	1–0	2–1
2021–22	CAF Champions League	2R	(Egypt) Al-Ahly	1–1	1–6	2–7
2021–22	CAF Confederation Cup	PO	(Democratic Republic of the Congo) DC Motema Pembe	2–0	0–1	2–1
2021–22	CAF Confederation Cup	GS	(Morocco) RS Berkane	2–2	3–5	4th
2021–22	CAF Confederation Cup	GS	(Tanzania) Simba	1–1	0–4	4th
2021–22	CAF Confederation Cup	GS	(Ivory Coast) ASEC Mimosas	2–0	1–2	4th

Notes

- PR: Preliminary round
- 1R: First round
- 2Q: Second qualifying round
- PO: Play-off round
- GS: Group stage
