= ASN Nigelec =

Nigerien football club

- Full name: Association Sportive Nationale de la Nigelec
- Ground: Stade Général Seyni Kountché
- Capacity: 50,000
- Chairman: Bassirou Daoura
- Manager: Idris Maradi
- League: Super Ligue
- 2025–26: Champions
Home colours	Away colours

Association Sportive Nationale de la Nigelec is a football (soccer) club from Niger based in Niamey. They won the Super Ligue for the first time in the 2021–22 season.

== Achievements ==
- Super Ligue: 2

2021–22, 2025–26.

- Niger Cup: 1

2013.

== CAF competitions record ==
Last update: 24 February 2023

Season	Competition	Round	Club	Home	Away	Aggregate
2014	CAF Confederation Cup	PR	(Algeria) CS Constantine	2–0	1–4	3–4
2022–23	CAF Champions League	1Q	(Guinea) SOA Renaissante	2–1	0–0	2–1
2022–23	CAF Champions League	2Q	(Morocco) Raja CA	0–2	1–0	0–3
2022–23	CAF Confederation Cup	PO	(Egypt) Pyramids	1–0	0–3	1–3

Notes

- PR: Preliminary round
- 1R: First round
- 2Q: Second qualifying round
- PO: Play-off round
- GS: Group stage
