= Urana FC =

Nigerien football club

Urana
- Full name: Urana FC d'Arlit
- Ground: Stade d'Arlit; Akokan
- Capacity: 7,000
- Chairman: Rhissa Iférouane
- Manager: Attaher Kidal
- League: Niger Premier League
- 2025–26: 12th
Home colours	Away colours	Third colours

Urana FC d'Arlit is a Nigerien football club based in Arlit. The club plays in Niger Premier League.

== Stadium ==
Homematches plays at the 7,000 capacity Stade d'Arlit.
