= Akokana FC =

Nigerien football club

- Full name: Akokana FC d'Arlit
- Ground: Stade d'Arlit; Arlit, Niger
- Capacity: 7,000
- Chairman: Abdoulaye Issa
- Manager: Ghali Hoggar
- League: Niger Premier League
- 2023–2024: 17th
Home colours

Akokana FC (Akokana FC d'Arlit ) is a semi-professional Football club based in the city of Arlit, Niger. The club currently competes in the Niger Premier League, the top football division in Niger.

The club won the Niger Cup in 2001.
