= AS Police (Niamey) =

Nigerien football club

- Full name: Association Sportive de la Police Nationale
- Founded: 1993
- Ground: Niamey, Niger
- Chairman: Issoufou Djingarey
- Manager: Soumana Bourem
- League: Niger Premier League
- 2025–26: 4th
Home colours	Away colours

Association Sportive Police, commonly referred to as AS Police, is a Nigerien association football club based in Niamey and sponsored by the Nigerien National Police. Founded in 1993, AS Police won the Niger Premier League and the Niger Cup double in 2008.

== Achievements ==
- Niger Premier League: 1

2008.

- Niger Cup: 1

2008.

- Niger Super Cup: 0

== Performance in CAF competitions ==
- CAF Champions League: 1 appearance

2009 - Preliminary Round

- CAF Confederation Cup: 1 appearance

2022 - First Round
