= AS GNN =

Nigerien football club

- Full name: Association sportive de la Garde nationale nigérienne
- Founded: 1974; 52 years ago as AS–FNIS; 2011; 15 years ago as AS–GNN
- Ground: Général Seyni Kountché Stadion; Niamey, Niger
- Capacity: 50,000
- Chairman: Col. Rabiou Aboubacar
- Manager: Oumar Kebbi
- League: Super Ligue
- 2025–26: 5th of 14
Home colours	Away colours

Association sportive de la Garde nationale nigérienne or simply AS GNN is a Nigerien football club based in Niamey and sponsored by the National Forces for Intervention and Security (FNIS).

In 2011 the club was renamed from AS-FNIS to AS GNN.

== Achievements ==
- Niger Premier League: 6

2005, 2006, 2011, 2014, 2023, 2024

- Niger Cup: 3

2007, 2018, 2023

- Niger Super Cup: 1

2011.

== Performance in CAF competitions ==
- CAF Champions League: 3 appearances

2006 – Preliminary Round
2007 – First Round
2012 –

- CAF Confederation Cup: 1 appearance

2008 – Preliminary Round

== Current squad ==
Note: Flags indicate national team as defined under FIFA eligibility rules; some limited exceptions apply. Players may hold more than one non-FIFA nationality.

No.	Pos.	Nation	Player
1	GK	NIG	Idrissa Dandano
2	DF	NIG	Abdoul Karim Paraiso
4	DF	NIG	Idrissa Halidou Garba
5	DF	NIG	Amadou Laouale
8	MF	NIG	Gafaru Adeleke
9	FW	NIG	Victorien Adebayor

No.	Pos.	Nation	Player
10	MF	NIG	Aziz Issoufou
11	MF	NIG	Moussa Hamza
12	DF	NIG	Djibrilla Moussa Bonkano
13	FW	NIG	Alhassane Kounshe
14	FW	NIG	Gbeneme Oumarou
18	DF	NIG	Issiaka Koudizé
