= Olympic FC de Niamey =

Nigerien football club

Olympic FC
- Full name: Olympic Football Club
- Founded: 1964; 62 years ago
- Ground: Général Seyni Kountché Stadion; Niamey, Niger
- Capacity: 50,000
- Chairman: (Niger) Mammanou Katagum
- Manager: (Nigeria) Hassan Abubakar
- League: Niger Premier League
- 2024–25: 8th
Home colours	Away colours

Olympic FC de Niamey is a Nigerien professional football club based in Niamey. Their home games are played at Général Seyni Kountché Stadion. The club was formed in 1964 from the football club Secteur 6.

== Achievements ==
- Niger Premier League: 12

1966, 1967, 1968, 1969, 1970 (as Secteur 6)
1976, 1977, 1978, 1989, 1998, 1999, 2012

- Niger Cup: 5

1975, 1977, 1990, 1991, 2003

== Performance in CAF competitions ==
- CAF Champions League: 1 appearance

2000 – Preliminary Round

- African Cup of Champions Clubs: 9 appearances

1967 – Preliminary Round
1968 – Preliminary Round
1969 – First Round

1970 – First Round
1971 – First Round
1975 – First Round

1977 – First Round
1978 – Second Round
1990 – Preliminary Round

- CAF Confederation Cup: 1 appearance

2004 – First Round

- CAF Cup: 1 appearance

1994 – Second Round

- CAF Cup Winners' Cup: 4 appearances

1991 – Second Round
1992 – Second Round

1993 – First Round

2001 – First Round
