= AS Douanes (Niger) =

Nigerien football club

- Full name: Association Sportive des Douanes de Niamey
- Ground: Général Seyni Kountché Stadion and Stade municipal de Niamey, Niamey, Niger
- Capacity: 50,000 and 5,000
- Chairman: Mamoudou Kollo
- Manager: Salou Ouallam
- League: Niger Premier League
- 2025–2026: 6th
Home colours

AS Douanes (Association Sportive des Douanes de Niamey, 'Niamey Customs Enforcement Sports Association') is a Nigerien football club based in Niamey and sponsored by the government taxation police. Prior to the 2005–6 season they played in the city of Tillabéry, and have competed in the top national league since the 2004 season, when they were promoted from the regional division 2. AS Douanes has won Nigerien league once but have never won cup championship.

== 2008 season ==
AS Douanes finished in third place in Group A of the first round of the 2008 Niger Premier League. They failed to qualify for the championship round, but easily avoided the elimination playoff, meaning they will return for the 2009 season.

== Achievements ==
- Niger Premier League: 2

2013, 2015.

- Niger Cup: 2

2016, 2022.

- Niger Super Cup: 2

2013, 2015.

== Performance in CAF competitions ==
- CAF Champions League: 1 appearance

2014 – Preliminary round

- CAF Confederation Cup: 0 appearances
