= AS SONIDEP =

Nigerien football club

- Full name: Association Sportive de la Société Nigérienne des Produits Pétroliers
- Ground: Stade municipal de Niamey, Stade Général Seyni Kountché (some games)
- Capacity: 5,000, 50,000
- Manager: Adourahamane Issa Maiga
- League: Niger Premier League
- 2017–18: 1st (champions)
Home colours	Away colours

AS SONIDEP, founded in 2014 by the Nigerien Petroleum Products Company (SONIDEP), is an association football club based in Niamey, Niger. It is the most recent Nigerien football club.

Internationally, the club participated in the CAF Confederation Cup of the 2015–2016 season following its success in the national cup. AS SONIDEP represents Niger in the African Champions League.

== Achievements ==
- Niger Premier League: 2

2018, 2019.

- Niger Cup: 2

2015, 2019.

== Performance in CAF competitions ==
- CAF Champions League: 3 appearances

2019 – preliminary round
2020 – preliminary round
2021 – first round

- CAF Confederation Cup: 2 appearances

2016 – preliminary round
2021 – play-off round

== Squad ==
Note: Flags indicate national team as defined under FIFA eligibility rules; some limited exceptions apply. Players may hold more than one non-FIFA nationality.

No.	Pos.	Nation	Player
1	GK	YEM	Bilal Saleh
16	GK	NIG	R. Oumarou
22	GK	NIG	M. Yahaya
5	MF	NIG	Aboubacar Traorè
2	DF	NIG	M. Aziz
13	DF	NIG	A. Razak
7	FW	NIG	Nicolas Koffi
3	DF	NIG	O. Barmou
4	DF	NIG	Abdel Kader Amadou
21	MF	NIG	S. Hamidou
14	MF	NIG	Mamane Amadou Sabo

No.	Pos.	Nation	Player
9	FW	NIG	K. Roberto
10	MF	NIG	M. Bily-To
15	MF	NIG	H. Abdou
6	MF	NIG	T. Samba
18	DF	NIG	S. Umar
28	MF	NIG	I. Amadou
12	MF	NIG	Gaddafi
26	FW	NIG	A. Idrissa
20	DF	NIG	A. César
11	MF	NIG	S. Lauali
8	DF	NIG	S. Traorè
