= Sahel SC =

Association football club in Niger

Sahel Sporting Club
- Full name: Sahel Sporting Club - SSC
- Nickname: SSC
- Founded: 1974
- Ground: Terrain musulman Niamey, Niger
- Chairman: Boubacar Saley
- Manager: (Niger) Maurice Gueye
- League: Super Ligue
- 2025–26: 7th
Home colours	Away colours

Sahel Sporting Club is a Nigerien professional football club based in Niamey. The club was formed in 1974 from the football club Secteur 7.

== Achievements ==
- Niger Premier League: 13
  - 1973 (as Secteur 7)
  - 1974, 1986, 1987, 1990, 1991, 1992, 1994, 1996, 2003, 2004, 2007, 2009
- Niger Cup: 12
  - 1974, 1978, 1986, 1992, 1993, 1996, 2004, 2006, 2011, 2012, 2014, 2017
  - Runner-up: 1991, 1999
- Niger Super Cup: 10
  - 1991, 1992, 1993, 1994, 2003, 2006, 2007, 2012, 2014, 2017
