= 2021–22 Al Ahly SC season =

Al Ahly
2021–22 season
- President: Mahmoud El Khatib
- Manager: Pitso Mosimane (until 13 June); Sami Komsan (interim 13 June – 30 June); Ricardo Soares (30 June – 31 August 2022)
- Stadium: Cairo International Stadium; Al Ahly WE Stadium
- Egyptian Premier League: 3rd
- 2020–21 Egypt Cup: Runners-up
- 2021–22 Egypt Cup: Quarter-finals
- CAF Champions League: Runners-up
- CAF Super Cup: Winners
- FIFA Club World Cup: Third Place (bronze medal winners)
Home colours	Away colours
- All statistics correct as of 15 September 2021.

The 2021–22 Al Ahly SC season was the 114th season in the football club's history and 63rd consecutive and overall season in the topflight of Egyptian football, the Egyptian Premier League. In addition to the domestic league, Al Ahly also are participating in this season's editions of the domestic cup, the Egypt Cup, and the first-tier African cup, the CAF Champions League and the FIFA Club World Cup.

== Kit information ==
Supplier: Umbro
Sponsors: WE, SAIB Bank, GLC Paints, Tiger Chips, Royal Dutch Shell

Home	Home alt	Away

== Players ==
=== Current squad ===
Stats As of 21 January 2022

Squad no.	Name	Nationality	Position(s)	Date of birth	Signed from	Apps	Goals
Goalkeepers
1	Mohamed El Shenawy(captain)	(Egypt)	GK	18 December 1988 (age 37)	(Egypt) Petrojet	169	0
16	Ali Lotfi	(Egypt)	GK	14 October 1989 (age 37)	(Egypt) ENPPI	22	0
31	Mostafa Shobier	(Egypt)	GK	1 March 2000 (age 26)	Youth academy	2	0
Defenders
2	Mahmoud Wahid	(Egypt)	LB	19 June 1994 (age 32)	(Egypt) Misr Lel Makkasa	33	0
13	Badr Benoun	(Morocco)	CB	30 September 1993 (age 33)	(Morocco) Raja CA	38	4
4	Mahmoud Metwalli	(Egypt)	CB/DM	4 January 1993 (age 33)	(Egypt) Ismaily	18	0
5	Ramy Rabia	(Egypt)	CB/DM	20 May 1993 (age 33)	(Portugal) Sporting CP	191	11
6	Yasser Ibrahim	(Egypt)	CB	10 February 1993 (age 33)	(Egypt) Smouha	77	5
24	Mohamed Abdelmonem	(Egypt)	CB	1 February 1999 (age 27)	Youth academy	0	0
12	Ayman Ashraf	(Egypt)	CB/LB	9 April 1991 (age 35)	(Egypt) Smouha	182	4
21	Ali Maâloul	(Tunisia)	LB	3 January 1990 (age 36)	(Tunisia) CS Sfaxien	166	28
30	Mohamed Hany	(Egypt)	RB	25 January 1996 (age 30)	Youth academy	198	3
28	Karim Fouad	(Egypt)	RB	1 October 1999 (age 27)	(Egypt) Nogoom	0	0
Midfielders
8	Hamdy Fathy	(Egypt)	DM/CB	1 October 1994 (age 32)	(Egypt) ENPPI	74	6
11	Walid Soliman (Vice-captain)	(Egypt)	AM/RW/LW	1 December 1984 (age 41)	(Egypt) ENPPI	276	67
15	Aliou Dieng	(Mali)	DM	16 October 1997 (age 29)	(Algeria) MC Alger	92	3
17	Amr El Solia	(Egypt)	CM/DM	2 April 1990 (age 36)	(United Arab Emirates) Al Shaab	223	21
19	Afsha	(Egypt)	AM/CM	5 March 1996 (age 30)	(Egypt) Pyramids	93	18
25	Akram Tawfik	(Egypt)	DM/CM/RB	8 November 1997 (age 29)	(Egypt) ENPPI	52	1
22	Mohamed Mahmoud	(Egypt)	DM/CM	7 May 1998 (age 28)	(Egypt) Wadi Degla SC	2	0
35	Ahmed Abdelkader	(Egypt)	AM	23 May 1999 (age 27)	Youth Academy	0	0
35	Ahmed Nabil Koka	(Egypt)	DM/CM	4 July 2001 (age 25)	Youth Academy	0	0
Forwards
10	Mohamed Sherif	(Egypt)	ST/RW/LW	4 February 1996 (age 30)	(Egypt) Wadi Degla	60	31
14	Hussein El Shahat	(Egypt)	RW/AM/RB	21 June 1992 (age 34)	(United Arab Emirates) Al Ain	104	25
18	Salah Mohsen	(Egypt)	ST/LW/RW	1 September 1998 (age 28)	(Egypt) ENPPI	67	15
27	Taher Mohamed	(Egypt)	ST/LW	3 March 1997 (age 29)	(Egypt) Al Mokawloon	42	6
38	Amar Hamdy	(Egypt)	RW	7 March 1999 (age 27)	(Egypt) Al Nasr	1	0
29	Luís Miquissone	(Mozambique)	RW	25 July 1995 (age 31)	(Tanzania) Simba	0	0
23	Percy Tau	(South Africa)	ST	13 May 1994 (age 32)	(England) Brighton & Hove Albion	0	0
9	Hossam Hassan	(Egypt)	ST	2 September 1993 (age 33)	(Egypt) Smouha	0	0
45	Ziad Tarek	(Egypt)	RW	6 September 2000 (age 26)	Youth academy	0	0

=== Youth Academy ===
Note: Flags indicate national team as defined under FIFA eligibility rules; some limited exceptions apply. Players may hold more than one non-FIFA nationality.

No.	Pos.	Nation	Player
32	FW	EGY	Ahmed Said Gharib
33	DF	EGY	Faress Mohamed
37	GK	EGY	Hamza Alaa
44	DF	EGY	Mohamed Ashraf

No.	Pos.	Nation	Player
39	DF	EGY	Abdel Rahman Ashraf
40	MF	EGY	Arabi Badr
43	MF	EGY	Mohamed Fakhri
43	MF	EGY	Mido Nabil

== Transfers ==
=== Transfers in ===
#	Position	Player	Transferred from	Fee	Date	Source
	FW	(Senegal) Aliou Badji	(Turkey) Ankaragücü	End of loan	30 June 2021	
	FW	(Egypt) Ahmed Yasser Rayyan	(Egypt) Ceramica Cleopatra	End of loan	30 August 2021	
	FW	(Egypt) Amar Hamdy	(Egypt) Al Ittihad	End of loan	30 August 2021	
	FW	(Egypt) Shady Radwan	National Bank of Egypt	End of loan	30 August 2021	
35	MF	(Egypt) Ahmed Abdelkader	(Egypt) Smouha	End of loan	30 August 2021	
9	FW	(Egypt) Hossam Hassan	(Egypt) Smouha	Undisclosed	26 August 2021	
	DF	(South Africa) Percy Tau	(England) Brighton & Hove Albion	£E35m	26 August 202	
29	MF	(Mozambique) Luís Miquissone	(Tanzania) Simba	£E15m	26 August 2021	
28	DF	(Egypt) Karim Fouad	(Egypt) Nogoom	£E13m	26 August 2021	
	FW	(Egypt) Mostafa El Badry	(Egypt) El Entag El Harby	£E7m	7 September 2021	
	DF	(Egypt) Mohamed Abdelmonem	(Egypt) Future	End of loan	30 January 2022	
	FW	(Democratic Republic of the Congo) Walter Bwalya	(Turkey) Malatyaspor	End of loan	1 January 2022	

=== Transfers out ===
Position	Player	Transferred to	Fee	Date	Source
DF	(Egypt) Ahmed Alaa	(Egypt) Al Masry	Released	30 August 2021	
FW	(Egypt) Marwan Mohsen	(Egypt) Future	Released	9 September 2021	
MF	(Egypt) Nasser Maher	(Egypt) Future	E£13m	1 October 2021	
FW	(Nigeria) Junior Ajayi	(Libya) Al Nasr	Released	19 February 2022	
FW	(Senegal) Aliou Badji	(France) Amiens	$18m	1 June 2022	

==== Loans out ====
Position	Player	Loaned to	Date	Loan expires	Source
FW	(Senegal) Aliou Badji	(France) Amiens	4 August 2021	30 June 2022	
FW	(Egypt) Ahmed Yasser Rayyan	(Turkey) Altay	17 August 2021	30 June 2022	
FW	(Democratic Republic of the Congo) Walter Bwalya	(Turkey) Malatyaspor	31 August 2021	1 January 2022	
DF	(Egypt) Ahmed Ramadan	(Egypt) Smouha	1 September 2021	30 September 2022	
MF	(Egypt) Shady Radwan	National Bank of Egypt	3 September 2021	30 September 2022	
MF	(Egypt) Mostafa El Badry	(Egypt) Future	7 September 2021	30 June 2023	
MF	(Egypt) Karim Walid	(Egypt) Future	13 September 2021	30 September 2022	
DF	(Egypt) Saad Samir	(Egypt) Future	15 September 2021	30 September 2022	
FW	(Democratic Republic of the Congo) Walter Bwalya	(Qatar) Al Sailiya	31 January 2022	30 June 2022	
DF	(Egypt) Mohamed El Maghrabi	(Czech Republic) Teplice	21 February 2022	30 June 2024	
FW	(Democratic Republic of the Congo) Walter Bwalya	(Saudi Arabia) Al Qadsiah	15 July 2022	30 June 2023	

== Competitions ==
Win Draw Loss

=== Overview ===
Competition	First match	Last match	Starting round	Final position	Record							
Competition	First match	Last match	Starting round	Final position	Pld	W	D	L	GF	GA	GD	Win %
Egyptian Premier League	27 October 2021	30 August 2022	Matchday 1	3rd	34	20	10	4	62	21	+41	58.82
2021–22 Egypt Cup	12 June 2022		Round of 32		2	2	0	0	2	0	+2	100.00
2020–21 Egypt Cup	26 June 2022	21 July 2022	Round of 16	Runners-up	3	2	0	1	5	3	+2	66.67
2022 EFA Cup	13 January 2022	30 January 2022	Group Stage	Group stage	5	0	4	1	3	6	−3	0.00
CAF Champions League	15 October 2021	30 May 2022	Second Round	Runners-up	13	6	4	3	23	13	+10	46.15
CAF Super Cup	22 December 2021		Final	Winners	1	1	0	0	1	1	+0	100.00
FIFA Club World Cup	2 February 2022	12 February 2022	Second round	Third place	3	2	0	1	5	2	+3	66.67
Total					61	33	18	10	101	46	+55	54.10

Last updated: 30 August 2022
Source: Competitions

=== Egyptian Premier League ===
==== League table ====
Pos	Team	Pld	W	D	L	GF	GA	GD	Pts	Qualification or relegation
1	Zamalek (Note: The 2021–22 Egyptian Premier League was not finished by the CAF deadline. As a result, the Egyptian Football Association announced that Zamalek and Al Ahly, who were at first and second place after 24 rounds respectively, represented Egypt in the 2022–23 CAF Champions League. Meanwhile, Future and Pyramids FC, who were at third and fourth place after 24 rounds respectively, represented Egypt in the 2022–23 CAF Confederation Cup.) (C)	34	24	5	5	62	29	+33	77	Qualification for the Champions League
2	Pyramids	34	22	5	7	56	25	+31	71	Qualification for the Confederation Cup
3	Al Ahly	34	20	10	4	62	21	+41	70	Qualification for the Champions League
4	Tala'ea El Gaish	34	14	14	6	27	24	+3	56 (Note: Head-to-Head points: Tala'ea El Gaish 6, Future 0.)	
5	Future	34	16	8	10	49	34	+15	56	Qualification for the Confederation Cup

Source: Soccerway
Rules for classification: 1) Points; 2) Head-to-Head points; 3) Head-to-Head goal difference; 4) Head-to-Head goals scored; 5) Head-to-Head away goals scored; 6) Goal difference; 7) Goals scored.
(Note: Head-to-head record is used only after all the matches between the teams in question have been played).
(C) Champions

==== Results summary ====
Overall								Home						Away					
Pld	W	D	L	GF	GA	GD	Pts	W	D	L	GF	GA	GD	W	D	L	GF	GA	GD
34	20	10	4	62	21	+41	70	13	4	0	36	5	+31	7	6	4	26	16	+10

Source: Soccerway

==== Results by round ====
Round	1	2	3	4	5	6	7	8	9	10	11	12	13	14	15	16	17	18	19	20	21	22	23	24	25	26	27	28	29	30	31	32	33	34
Ground	A	H	A	H	A	H	A	H	A	H	A	H	A	H	A	H	A	H	A	H	A	H	A	H	A	H	A	H	A	H	A	H	A	H
Result	W	W	W	W	W	W	D	W	D	W	W	W	L	W	W	D	D	D	D	D	D	W	L	W	L	W	W	D	W	W	D	W	L	W
Position	1	1	1	1	1	1	1	1	3	1	1							3			3		3	3	3	3	3	3	3	3	3	3	3	3

Updated to match(es) played on 11 March 2022. Source: Soccerway
A = Away; H = Home; W = Win; D = Draw; L = Loss

==== Matches ====
The fixtures for the 2021–22 season were announced on 12 October 2021.

27 October 2021 1	Ismaily	0–4	Al Ahly	Alexandria
20:00 CAT (UTC+2)	El Mohamady (yellow card) 28'	Report	Maâloul 21' (pen.); Tau 23', 32'; Dieng (yellow card) 45' (red card) 74'; El Solia (yellow card) 85'; Abd El Kader 87'	Stadium: Borg El Arab Stadium; Attendance: 1,000; Referee: Mohamed Adel

31 October 2021 2	Al Ahly	1–0	National Bank of Egypt	Cairo
20:00 CAT (UTC+2)	Sherif 62'	Report	Farid (yellow card) 51'	Stadium: Al Ahly WE Stadium; Attendance: 1,000; Referee: Mahmoud Ashour

5 November 2021 3	Zamalek	3–5	Al Ahly	Cairo
20:00 CAT (UTC+2)	Hamed (yellow card) 34'; El Said (yellow card) 38'; Fathi 51'; Zizo (yellow card) 66' (goal) 80' (pen.); Bencharki 90'	Report	Abou Gabal 16' (o.g.); Maâloul 20' (pen.) 63' (pen.); Sherif 25'; Aliou Dieng 53'; Ashraf (yellow card) 66'	Stadium: Cairo Stadium; Attendance: 2,000; Referee: Mohamed Adel

19 November 2021 4	Al Ahly	1–0	Al Mokawloon Al Arab	Cairo
20:00 CAT (UTC+2)	Ashraf (yellow card) 12'; Tawfik (yellow card) 45'; Fathy 67' (yellow card) 90+7' (red card) 90+9'	Report	Bassam (yellow card) 28'; Samir (yellow card) 38'; Abdelaziz (yellow card) 54'; Magdy (yellow card) 73'; Ali (yellow card) 90+1'	Stadium: Al Ahly WE Stadium; Attendance: 1,000

22 November 2021 5	Ghazl El Mahalla	2–3	Al Ahly	El Mahalla El Kubra
19:30 CAT (UTC+2)	Yehia 57'; Hamed (yellow card) 75'; Tawfik 90+4' (o.g.); El Nadry (yellow card) 90+6'	Report	Afsha 10'; Tau 49'; El Solia (yellow card) 55'; Benoun (yellow card) 84'; Maâloul 90+8'	Stadium: Ghazl El Mahalla Stadium; Attendance: 1,000; Referee: Mohamed Hanafi

25 November 2021 6	Al Ahly	4–1	Smouha	Cairo
16:00 CAT (UTC+2)	Benoun (penalty missed) 6'; Tawfik (yellow card) 13'; Ashraf 31'; Tau 35' 80'; El Shahat 67'	Report	Shokry (yellow card) 3'; Metwaly (yellow card) 45' (goal) 66'	Stadium: Al Ahly WE Stadium; Attendance: 1,000; Referee: Mahmoud El Banna

26 December 2021 7	Future	1–1	Al Ahly	Cairo
20:00 CAT (UTC+2)	Walid 57'; Mohamed (yellow card) 87'	Report	Sherif 3'; El Shenawy (yellow card) 40'; Benoun (yellow card) 90+2'	Stadium: Al Ahly WE Stadium; Attendance: 1,000; Referee: Mohamed Hanafi

22 February 2022 10	Al Ahly	4–0	Misr Lel Makkasa	Cairo
20:00 CAT (UTC+2)	Miquissone 13', 15'; El Shahat 43'; Sherif (yellow card) 48'; Tarek 87'; El Solia (yellow card) 90+3'	Report	Abdelmoniem (yellow card) 88'	Stadium: Al Ahly WE Stadium; Attendance: 1,000; Referee: Abdelaziz El Sayed

1 March 2022 11	Pharco	1–4	Al Ahly	Alexandria
20:00 CAT (UTC+2)	Ibrahim 17'; Emad (yellow card) 64'	Report	Sherif 5'; Afsha 7', 13'; Fathy (yellow card) 20'; Miquissone (yellow card) 27'; Tau (yellow card) 70'; Abdelmonem (yellow card) 27'; El Shahat 87'	Stadium: Alexandria Stadium; Attendance: 1,000; Referee: Mohamed Maarouf

8 March 2022 8	Al Ahly	3–0	Pyramids	Cairo
20:00 CAT (UTC+2)	Hany (yellow card) 19'; Afsha (yellow card) 38' (goal) 47'; Sherif (yellow card) 61' (goal) 90+6'; Abdelmonem (yellow card) 64'; El Solia 86'	Report	Sobhi (yellow card) 21'; Gaber (yellow card) 62'; Lakay (yellow card) 66'	Stadium: Al Ahly WE Stadium; Attendance: 2,000; Referee: Mahmoud El Banna

6 April 2022 12	Al Ahly	1–0	Al Ittihad	Cairo
21:30 CAT (UTC+2)	Dieng (yellow card) 7'; Tau (penalty missed) 17'; Miquissone 35'; Abdel Kader (yellow card) 43'	Report		Stadium: Al Ahly WE Stadium; Referee: Ahmed Ghandour

9 April 2022 13	Al Masry	1–0	Al Ahly	Alexandria
21:30 CAT (UTC+2)	Ayouni 8' (yellow card) 86'; Hassan Ali (yellow card) 11'	Report	Ashraf (yellow card) 7'; Dieng (yellow card) 38'	Stadium: Borg El Arab Stadium; Referee: Mahmoud Ashour

27 April 2022 16	Al Ahly	0–0	Tala'ea El Gaish	Cairo
21:30 CAT (UTC+2)		Report		Stadium: Al Ahly WE Stadium; Referee: Mahmoud El Banna

30 April 2022 17	Ceramica Cleopatra	1–1	Al Ahly	Nasr City, Cairo
21:30 CAT (UTC+2)	Mohamed Ibrahim (yellow card) 53'; Morsy 88'; Ahmed Mohsen (yellow card) 90+10'; Mohamed (yellow card) 90+11'	Report	Afsha 90+11' (pen.)	Stadium: Osman Ahmed Osman Stadium; Referee: Nader Kamar

18 May 2022 19	National Bank of Egypt	0–0	Al Ahly	Nasr City, Cairo
21:00 CAT (UTC+2)	Ahmed Said (yellow card) 66'; El Zonfouly (yellow card) 90+2'; Mahmoud Sayed (yellow card) 90+4'; Faisal (yellow card) 90+6'	Report	Ashraf (yellow card) 38'; Hany (yellow card) 66'	Stadium: Osman Ahmed Osman Stadium; Referee: Amin Omar

21 May 2022 15	ENPPI	1–2	Al Ahly	Cairo
22:00 CAT (UTC+2)	Atef (yellow card) 45+1'; Zeyad Kamal (yellow card) 57'; Mostafa Shalaby 76'; Ebuka (yellow card) 90+1'; Yehia (yellow card) 90+6' (yellow-red card) 90+7'	Report	Taher (yellow card) 60'; Hany (yellow card) 89'; Maâloul 90+5', 90+7' (yellow card) 90+9'	Stadium: Osman Ahmed Osman Stadium; Referee: Mohamed Sabahi

25 May 2022 14	Al Ahly	4–1	Eastern Company	Cairo
21:00 CAT (UTC+2)	El Shahat 25'; Taher 31' (pen.); Abdel Kader 57'; Rabia (yellow card) 85'; Soliman 90+1'	Report	Saber El Shimi (yellow card) 12'; Firas Ifia 76' (yellow card) 86'; Hossam Hassan (yellow card) 80'	Stadium: Al Ahly WE Stadium; Referee: Ibrahim Nour El Din

19 June 2022 20	Al Ahly	2–2	Zamalek	Cairo
20:00 CAT (UTC+2)	Sherif 12'; Mohsen 80'	Report	Bencharki 68'; Shikabala 76' (yellow card) 76'; Farouk (yellow card) 89'	Stadium: Al Ahly WE Stadium; Attendance: 5,000; Referee: José Munuera

22 June 2022 22	Al Ahly	2–1	Ghazl El Mahalla	Cairo
21:30 CAT (UTC+2)	Afsha 12' (pen.); Sherif 90+2'	Report	Mao 58'; Mostafa Mahmoud (yellow card) 79'; El Henawy (yellow card) 83'; El Sheikh (red card) 90+8'	Stadium: Al Ahly WE Stadium; Referee: Abdelaziz El Sayed

29 June 2022 23	Smouha	3–2	Al Ahly	Alexandria
21:30 CAT (UTC+2)	Ahmed Hakam (yellow card) 2'; Hamdy 9', 46'; El Ouadi 45+1'; Soliman (yellow card) 45+3'; Sherif Reda (yellow card) 45+4'	Report	Afsha (yellow card) 43'; Taher 59' (yellow card) 86'; Hassan 90+4'	Stadium: Alexandria Stadium; Referee: Mahmoud El Banna

5 July 2022 9	El Gouna	0–0	Al Ahly	El Gouna
21:00 CAT (UTC+2)	Seif El Agouz (yellow card) 12'; Mahmoud Shabrawy (yellow card) 46'	Report	Fouad (yellow card) 90+1'	Stadium: Khaled Bichara Stadium; Referee: Mohamed Adel

12 July 2022 24	Al Ahly	4–0	Future	Cairo
21:00 CAT (UTC+2)	Afsha 23', 45+1'; Fathy (yellow card) 38'; Maâloul 43' (pen.); Abdel Kader 59'; Mohsen (yellow card) 69'; Fakhri (yellow card) 82'	Report	Kamal (yellow card) 69'	Stadium: Al Ahly WE Stadium; Attendance: 2,500; Referee: Mohamed El Hanafi

16 July 2022 25	Pyramids	2–0	Al Ahly	Cairo
21:00 CAT (UTC+2)	Ben Youssef 29'; Tawfik (yellow card) 45'; Traoré 65'	Report	Hassan (yellow card) 36'; Fouad (yellow card) 70'; Abdel Kader (yellow card) 73'; Dieng (yellow card) 77'	Stadium: 30 June Stadium; Attendance: 2,500; Referee: Carlos del Cerro

24 July 2022 26	Al Ahly	2–0	El Gouna	Cairo
18:30 CAT (UTC+2)	El Solia (yellow card) 58'; Rabia 73'; Maâloul 78' (pen.)	Report	Abdelgawad (yellow card) 36'	Stadium: Al Ahly WE Stadium; Attendance: 2,500; Referee: Ibrahim Nour El Din

27 July 2022 27	Misr Lel Makkasa	0–1	Al Ahly	Cairo
21:00 CAT (UTC+2)	Mohamed Adel (yellow card) 26'; Mostafa (yellow card) 44'	Report	Dieng 23'; Hany (yellow card) 90+5'	Stadium: Cairo Military Academy Stadium; Referee: Mahmoud Nagi

30 July 2022 21	Al Mokawloon Al Arab	0–0	Al Ahly	Cairo
21:00 CAT (UTC+2)	Amir Abed (yellow card) 32'; Ahmed Mohamed (yellow card) 37'; Hassan El Shami (yellow card) 45+3'; Niass (yellow card) 80'; Abou El Saoud (yellow card) 85'	Report	Fouad (yellow card) 20'; Maâloul (penalty missed) 39'	Stadium: Osman Ahmed Osman Stadium; Referee: Mohamed Adel

3 August 2022 28	Al Ahly	0–0	Pharco	Cairo
21:00 CAT (UTC+2)	Rabia (yellow card) 61'; Mahmoud (yellow card) 90+4'	Report	Azmi Ghouma (yellow card) 27'; Encada (yellow card) 33'; Sokari (yellow card) 65'; Sobhy (yellow card) 81'; Mahmoud Emad (red card) 87'	Stadium: Al Ahly WE Stadium; Referee: Ahmed Ghandour

7 August 2022 29	Al Ittihad	0–3	Al Ahly	Alexandria
21:00 CAT (UTC+2)	Hesham Saleh (yellow card) 24'; Abdel Monsef (yellow card) 37'; Salifu (yellow card) 52' (yellow-red card) 69'; Simporé (yellow card) 55'; Ahmed Elkalamawy (yellow card) 58'; Hassan (yellow card) 65'	Report	Gharib 35' 47'; Tarek 44'; Abdelmonem (yellow card) 71'; Tau (yellow card) 90+4'	Stadium: Borg El Arab Stadium; Referee: Ibrahim Nour El Din

10 August 2022 30	Al Ahly	2–0	Al Masry	Alexandria
21:00 CAT (UTC+2)	Miquissone (yellow card) 10'; Fakhri (yellow card) 59'; Rabia 80' (pen.); Hany (yellow card) 90+1'; Hassan 90+6'	Report		Stadium: Borg El Arab Stadium; Referee: Mahmoud El Banna

17 August 2022 31	Eastern Company	0–0	Al Ahly	Cairo
21:00 CAT (UTC+2)	Ahmed Abdel Mawgod (yellow card) 22'; Ahmed Hamza (yellow card) 33'; Saleh (red card) 81'	Report		Stadium: Osman Ahmed Osman Stadium; Referee: Mohamed Sabahi

21 August 2022 18	Al Ahly	0–0	Ismaily	Alexandria
21:00 CAT (UTC+2)		Report	Madbouly (yellow card) 52'	Stadium: Borg El Arab Stadium; Referee: Mohamed El Hanafi

24 August 2022 32	Al Ahly	2–0	ENPPI	Cairo
18:00 CAT (UTC+2)	Miquissone 71'; Mahmoud 90'	Report	Ahmed El Agouz (yellow card) 4'; Hesham Adel (yellow card) 10'; Moamen Rady (yellow card) 57'; Mohamed Morsi (yellow card) 85'; Mostafa Shalaby (penalty missed) 69'	Stadium: Al Ahly WE Stadium; Referee: Tarek Magdy

26 August 2022 33	Tala'ea El Gaish	1–0	Al Ahly	Cairo
21:00 CAT (UTC+2)	Samir 67'	Report	Gharib (yellow card) 39'; Nabil (yellow card) 85'	Stadium: Cairo Military Academy Stadium; Referee: Mohamed Abass

29 August 2022 34	Al Ahly	4–0	Ceramica Cleopatra	Cairo
21:00 CAT (UTC+2)	Gharib 35'; Rabia 68' (pen.); Miquissone 72'; Rafaat Khalil 78' (yellow card) 90+1'		Bonsu (red card) 66'	Stadium: Al Ahly WE Stadium; Referee: Ahmed Gamal

=== Egypt Cup ===
==== 2020–21 Egypt Cup ====
26 June 2022 (Note: The Al Ahly v Pyramids match, originally scheduled to be played on 29 September 2021, was postponed due to Egypt national team preparation for the 2022 FIFA World Cup qualifiers.) Quarter-finals	Al Ahly	2–1	Pyramids	Cairo
21:00 CAT (UTC+2)	Taher 18'; Hossam Hassan 90'	Report	Sobhi 90+6' (pen.)	Stadium: Cairo Stadium; Attendance: 0 Referee: István Kovács

2 July 2022 Semi-finals	Al Ahly	2–0	Petrojet	Cairo
21:00	Afsha 8'; Abdelmonem 72'	Report		Stadium: Cairo Stadium; Attendance: 0 Referee: Mahmoud Nagi

21 July 2022 Final	Al Ahly	1–2	Zamalek	Cairo
21:00	Hassan 55'	Report	Zizo 5'; Ashour 29'	Stadium: Cairo International Stadium; Attendance: 5,000; Referee: Szymon Marciniak (Poland)

==== 2021–22 Egypt Cup ====
12 June 2022 Round of 32	Al Ahly	1–0	Al Masry Sallum	Cairo
21:00	Abdel Kader 59'	Report		Stadium: Al Ahly WE Stadium; Attendance: 0 Referee: Nader Kamar

14 August 2022 Round of 16	Al Ahly	1–0	Misr Lel Makkasa	Cairo
20:00	Rabia 90+1' (pen.)	Report	Hesham Hafez (yellow card) 66' (yellow-red card) 90+1'; Avire (yellow card) 86'; Mohamed Adel (yellow card) 90+1'	Stadium: Al Ahly WE Stadium; Referee: Wael Farhan

October 2022 Quarter Final	Al Ahly	v	Al Mokawloon Al Arab
20:00

=== 2022 EFA Cup ===
2022 EFA League Cup is the first edition of the EFA Cup, an annual knockout football competition for Egyptian Premier League clubs. Al Ahly played most of the matches with a squad mainly consists of youth team players.

==== Group stage ====
Pos	Team	Pld	W	D	L	GF	GA	GD	Pts	Qualification or relegation
1	Ismaily	5	2	3	0	7	3	+4	9	Advanced to Semifinals
2	Al Mokawloon Al Arab	5	2	2	1	4	3	+1	8	
3	Smouha	5	2	1	2	6	4	+2	7	
4	El Gouna	5	1	2	2	4	7	−3	5	
5	National Bank of Egypt	5	0	4	1	3	4	−1	4	
6	Al Ahly	5	0	4	1	3	6	−3	4	

Updated to match(es) played on unknown. Source: Soccerway

==== Matches ====
13 January 2022 1	Al Ahly	0–0	El Gouna	Cairo
14:30 CAT (UTC+2)		Report		Stadium: Al Ahly WE Stadium

17 January 2022 2	Ismaily	1–1	Al Ahly	Alexandria
14:30 CAT (UTC+2)	Algarañaz 16'	Report	Ahmed Sayed Gharib 90+2'	Stadium: Borg El Arab Stadium

21 January 2022 3	Al Ahly	1–1	Al Mokawloon Al Arab	Cairo
17:00 CAT (UTC+2)	Tarek 55'	Report	Hamdy Zaky 37' (pen.)	Stadium: Al Ahly WE Stadium

27 January 2022 4	Smouha	3–0	Al Ahly	Alexandria
17:00 CAT (UTC+2)	Abdelaati 27'; El Ouadi 48', 51'	Report		Stadium: Alexandria Stadium

30 January 2022 5	Al Ahly	1–1	National Bank of Egypt	Cairo
14:00 CAT (UTC+2)	Rabia 51'	Report	Helal 84' (pen.)	Stadium: Al Ahly WE Stadium

=== CAF Super Cup ===
22 December 2021	Al Ahly (Egypt)	1–1 (6–5 p)	(Morocco) Raja Casablanca	Ahmed bin Ali Stadium, Al Rayyan
17:00 GMT (20:00 UTC+3)	Taher 90'	Report	Ibrahim 13' (o.g.)	Referee: Jean-Jacques Ndala Ngambo (DR Congo)
	Penalties
	Maâloul (penalty scored); Benoun (penalty scored); Tau (penalty scored); Abdel Kader (penalty scored); Taher (penalty scored); Tawfik (penalty scored)		(penalty scored) Zrida; (penalty scored) El Wardi; (penalty scored) Hadhoudi; (penalty scored) Benhalib; (penalty scored) Moutouali; (penalty missed) Madkour

=== CAF Champions League ===
Al Ahly entered the competition for the 24th consecutive time after winning the league and the CAF Champions League in the previous season. Al Ahly were ranked first in the CAF 5-year ranking prior to the start of the 2021–22 season. As a result, they entered the competition from the Second round.

==== Qualifying rounds ====
===== Second round =====
16 October 2021 First leg	USGN (Niger)	1–1	(Egypt) Al Ahly	Niamey
16:30 UTC+1	Diori 75'	Report	Maâloul 19' (pen.)	Stadium: Stade Général Seyni Kountché; Referee: Daniel Nii Laryea (Ghana)

22 October 2021 Second leg	Al Ahly (Egypt)	6–1 (7–2 agg.)	(Niger) USGN	Cairo
18:00 UTC+2	Sherif 9'; Magdy 26', 58'; El Shahat 64'; Kahraba 69'; Fathy 89'	Report	Hinsa 35'	Stadium: Al Ahly WE Stadium; Referee: Ahmad Imtehaz Heeralall (Mauritius)

==== Group stage ====
===== Group A =====
Pos	Team	Pld	W	D	L	GF	GA	GD	Pts	Qualification	MSD	AHL	HIL	MER
1	(South Africa) Mamelodi Sundowns	6	5	1	0	10	2	+8	16	Advance to knockout stage	—	1–0	1–0	3–0
2	(Egypt) Al Ahly	6	3	1	2	7	5	+2	10	Advance to knockout stage	0–1	—	1–0	3–2
3	(Sudan) Al Hilal	6	1	1	4	4	8	−4	4 (Note: Head-to-head points: Al Hilal 3, Al Merrikh 3. Head-to-head goal differences: Al Hilal 0, Al Merrikh 0. Head-to-head away goals: Al Hilal 1, Al Merrikh 0)		2–4	0–0	—	1–0
4	(Sudan) Al Merrikh	6	1	1	4	5	11	−6	4		0–0	1–3	2–1	—

Source: CAF
Notes:

18 February 2022 Matchday 2	Al Hilal (Sudan)	0–0	(Egypt) Al Ahly	Omdurman
15:00 UTC+2		Report		Stadium: Al-Hilal Stadium; Referee: Noureddine El Jaafari (Morocco)

26 February 2022 Matchday 3	Al Ahly (Egypt)	0–1	(South Africa) Mamelodi Sundowns	Cairo
21:00 UTC+2		Report	Morena 85'	Stadium: Cairo International Stadium; Referee: Redouane Jiyed (Morocco)

5 March 2022 (Note: The Al Ahly v Al Merrikh match, originally scheduled to be played on 11/12 February 2022, was rescheduled to be played on 5 March 2022 due to Al Ahly's participation in the 2021 FIFA Club World Cup in United Arab Emirates between 3 and 12 February 2022.) Matchday 1	Al Ahly (Egypt)	3–2	(Sudan) Al Merrikh	Cairo
21:00 UTC+2	Sherif 2', 34'; Karshoum 76' (o.g.)	Report	Edjomariegwe 43'; Saadeldin 69'	Stadium: Cairo International Stadium; Referee: Hélder Martins de Carvalho (Angola)

12 March 2022 Matchday 4	Mamelodi Sundowns (South Africa)	1–0	(Egypt) Al Ahly	Johannesburg
15:00 UTC+2	Shalulile 23'	Report		Stadium: FNB Stadium; Referee: Bamlak Tessema Weyesa (Ethiopia)

18 March 2022 Matchday 5	Al Merrikh (Sudan)	1–3	(Egypt) Al Ahly	Cairo (Egypt) (Note: Al Merrikh play their group stage home matches at Al Ahly WE Al Salam Stadium, Cairo (Egypt), instead of their regular home stadium Al Merrikh Stadium, Omdurman (Sudan), which did not meet CAF requirements.)
18:00 UTC+2	Agab 60'	Report	Tau 19'; Sherif 72'; Abdel Kader 73'	Stadium: Al Ahly WE Al Salam Stadium

3 April 2022 Matchday 6	Al Ahly (Egypt)	1–0	(Sudan) Al Hilal	Cairo Egypt
22:00 UTC+2	El Shahat 74'	Report		Stadium: Al Ahly WE Al Salam Stadium; Referee: Janny Sikazwe (Zambia)

==== Knockout stage ====
===== Quarter-finals =====
16 April 2022 First leg	Al Ahly (Egypt)	2–1	(Morocco) Raja Casablanca	Cairo
22:00 UTC+2	El Solia 13' (pen.); El Shahat 23'	Report	Zrida 45+1'	Stadium: Al Ahly WE Al Salam Stadium; Referee: Jean Jacques Ndala Ngambo (DR Congo)

22 April 2022 Second leg	Raja Casablanca (Morocco)	1–1 (2–3 agg.)	(Egypt) Al Ahly	Casablanca
22:00 UTC+0	Ngoma 5'	Report	Abdelmonem 44'	Stadium: Stade Mohammed V Referee: Maguette Ndiaye (Senegal)

===== Semi-finals =====
7 May 2022 First leg	Al Ahly (Egypt)	4–0	(Algeria) ES Sétif	Cairo
21:00 UTC+2	Tau 30', 90'; Mohamed 54'; Sherif 72'	Report		Stadium: Al Ahly WE Al Salam Stadium; Referee: Bamlak Tessema Weyesa (Ethiopia)

14 May 2022 Second leg	ES Sétif (Algeria)	2–2 (2–6 agg.)	(Egypt) Al Ahly	Algiers (Note: ES Sétif play their group stage home matches at Stade du 5 Juillet, Algiers, instead of their regular home stadium Stade 8 Mai 1945, Sétif, which did not meet CAF requirements.)
20:00 UTC+1	Kendouci 45'; Benayad 61'	Report	Abdel Kader 2'; Sherif 90+2'	Stadium: Stade du 5 Juillet; Referee: Sadok Selmi (Tunisia)

===== Final =====
30 May 2022 Final	Al Ahly (Egypt)	0–2	(Morocco) Wydad AC	Casablanca, Morocco
20:00 UTC+1	Dieng (yellow card) 56'; Rabia (red card) 90+2'	Report	El Moutaraji 15', 48'; Farhane (yellow card) 44'	Stadium: Stade Mohammed V Attendance: 45,000; Referee: Victor Gomes (South Africa)

=== FIFA Club World Cup ===
5 February 2022 Second round	Al Ahly (Egypt)	1–0	(Mexico) Monterrey	Al Nahyan Stadium, Abu Dhabi
20:30 AST (UTC+3)	Maghraby (yellow card) 31'; Hany 53'; Afsha (yellow card) 66'; Lotfi (yellow card) 77'; Dieng (yellow card) 90+2'	Report		Attendance: 9,396; Referee: Chris Beath (Australia)

8 February 2022 Semi final	Palmeiras (Brazil)	2–0	(Egypt) Al Ahly	Al Nahyan Stadium, Abu Dhabi
20:30	Veiga 39'; Dudu 49'	Report	Ashraf (red card) 81'	Attendance: 11,902; Referee: Clément Turpin (France)

12 February 2022 Match for third place	Al Hilal (Saudi Arabia)	0–4	(Egypt) Al Ahly	Al Nahyan Stadium, Abu Dhabi
17:00	Pereira (red card) 14'; Kanno (red card) 28'; Al-Faraj (yellow card) 58'	Report	Ibrahim 8', 17'; Hany (yellow card) 32'; Abdel Kader 40'; Taher (yellow card) 45+6'; Sherif (yellow card) 55'; El Solia 64'	Attendance: 9,008; Referee: Clément Turpin (France)

== Statistics ==
=== Goalscorers ===
As of 31 August 2022

Rank	Position	Name	Premier League	Egypt Cup	EFA Cup	Egyptian Super Cup	CAF Champions League	CAF Super Cup	Club World Cup	Total
1	FW	(Egypt) Sherif	7	0	0	0	6	0	0	13
2	MF	(Egypt) Afsha	8	1	0	0	2	0	0	11
3	DF	(Tunisia) Maâloul	8	0	0	0	1	0	0	9
4	FW	(South Africa) Tau	5	0	0	0	3	0	0	8
5	FW	(Egypt) El Shahat	4	0	0	0	3	0	0	7
5	FW	(Egypt) Abd Elkader	3	1	0	0	2	0	1	7
7	MF	(Egypt) Taher	2	1	0	0	1	1	0	5
7	MF	(Mozambique) Miquissone	5	0	0	0	0	0	0	5
7	DF	(Egypt) Rabia	3	1	1	0	0	0	0	5
10	FW	(Egypt) Hossam Hassan	2	2	0	0	0	0	0	4
10	FW	(Egypt) Ahmed Sayed Gharib	3	0	1	0	0	0	0	4
12	MF	(Egypt) Ziad Tarek	2	0	1	0	0	0	0	3
12	DF	(Egypt) El Solia	1	0	0	0	1	0	1	3
14	DF	(Mali) Dieng	2	0	0	0	0	0	0	2
14	MF	(Egypt) Fathy	1	0	0	0	1	0	0	2
14	DF	(Egypt) Yasser	0	0	0	0	0	0	2	2
14	DF	(Egypt) Abdelmonem	0	1	0	0	1	0	0	2
18	DF	(Egypt) Ayman	1	0	0	0	0	0	0	1
18	FW	(Egypt) Salah Mohsen	1	0	0	0	0	0	0	1
18	MF	(Egypt) Walid Soliman	1	0	0	0	0	0	0	1
18	FW	(Egypt) Kahraba	0	0	0	0	1	0	0	1
18	DF	(Egypt) Hany	0	0	0	0	0	0	1	1
18	MF	(Egypt) Mohamed Mahmoud	1	0	0	0	0	0	0	1
18	MF	(Egypt) Rafaat Khalil	1	0	0	0	0	0	0	1
Own goals			1	0	0	0	1	0	0	2
Total			62	7	3	0	23	1	5	101

=== Clean sheets ===
As of 31 August 2022

Rank	Name	Premier League	Egypt Cup	EFA Cup	Egyptian Super Cup	CAF Champions League	CAF Super Cup	Club World Cup	Total
1	(Egypt) Mohamed El Shenawy	14	0	0	0	0	0	0	14
2	(Egypt) Ali Lotfi	6	1	0	0	1	0	2	10
3	(Egypt) Mostafa Shobier	3	1	1	0	0	0	0	4
Total		23	2	1	0	1	0	2	29
