= 2022 FIFA Club World Cup squads =

Below is a list of the 2022 FIFA Club World Cup squads. Each team had to name a 23-man squad (three of whom had to be goalkeepers). Injury replacements were allowed until 24 hours before the team's first match.

== Al Ahly ==
Manager: (Switzerland) Marcel Koller

Note: Flags indicate national team as defined under FIFA eligibility rules; some limited exceptions apply. Players may hold more than one non-FIFA nationality.

No.	Pos.	Nation	Player
1	GK	EGY	Mohamed El Shenawy
2	MF	EGY	Khaled Abdel Fattah
4	DF	EGY	Mahmoud Metwalli
5	DF	EGY	Ramy Rabia
6	DF	EGY	Yasser Ibrahim
7	MF	EGY	Kahraba
8	MF	EGY	Hamdy Fathy
9	MF	EGY	Ahmed Abdel Kader
10	FW	EGY	Mohamed Sherif
13	MF	EGY	Marwan Attia
14	MF	EGY	Hussein El Shahat
15	MF	MLI	Aliou Dieng

No.	Pos.	Nation	Player
16	GK	EGY	Ali Lotfi
17	MF	EGY	Amr El Solia
19	MF	EGY	Afsha
21	DF	TUN	Ali Maâloul
23	FW	RSA	Percy Tau
24	DF	EGY	Mohamed Abdelmonem
27	FW	EGY	Taher Mohamed
30	DF	EGY	Mohamed Hany
33	GK	EGY	Hamza Alaa
34	MF	EGY	Mohamed Fakhri
40	DF	EGY	Mohamed Ashraf

== Al-Hilal ==
Manager: (Argentina) Ramón Díaz

Note: Flags indicate national team as defined under FIFA eligibility rules; some limited exceptions apply. Players may hold more than one non-FIFA nationality.

No.	Pos.	Nation	Player
1	GK	KSA	Abdullah Al-Mayouf
4	DF	KSA	Khalifah Al-Dawsari
5	DF	KSA	Ali Al-Bulaihi
6	MF	COL	Gustavo Cuéllar
8	MF	KSA	Abdullah Otayf
9	FW	NGR	Odion Ighalo
10	FW	ARG	Luciano Vietto
11	FW	KSA	Saleh Al-Shehri
14	FW	KSA	Abdullah Al-Hamdan
16	MF	KSA	Nasser Al-Dawsari
17	FW	MLI	Moussa Marega
19	MF	PER	André Carrillo

No.	Pos.	Nation	Player
20	DF	KOR	Jang Hyun-soo
21	GK	KSA	Mohammed Al-Owais
28	MF	KSA	Mohamed Kanno
29	MF	KSA	Salem Al-Dawsari
31	GK	KSA	Habib Al-Wotayan
42	DF	KSA	Muath Faqihi
43	MF	KSA	Musab Al-Juwayr
66	DF	KSA	Saud Abdulhamid
67	DF	KSA	Mohammed Al-Khaibari
70	DF	KSA	Mohammed Jahfali
96	MF	BRA	Michael

== Auckland City ==
Manager: (Spain) Albert Riera

Note: Flags indicate national team as defined under FIFA eligibility rules; some limited exceptions apply. Players may hold more than one non-FIFA nationality.

No.	Pos.	Nation	Player
1	GK	NZL	Conor Tracey
2	MF	NZL	Mario Ilich
3	DF	NZL	Adam Mitchell
4	DF	NZL	Christian Gray
5	DF	NZL	Nikko Boxall
7	MF	NZL	Cameron Howieson
8	MF	ESP	Gerard Garriga
9	FW	NZL	Angus Kilkolly
10	FW	NZL	Dylan Manickum
11	FW	NZL	Ryan de Vries
12	DF	KOS	Regont Murati
13	DF	NZL	Nathan Lobo

No.	Pos.	Nation	Player
14	DF	NZL	Jordan Vale
15	MF	NZL	Aidan Carey
16	FW	NZL	Joseph Lee
17	MF	NZL	Reid Drake
18	GK	NZL	Finn Dockerty
19	FW	NZL	Liam Gillion
20	FW	ARG	Emiliano Tade
21	MF	NZL	Michael den Heijer
23	MF	NZL	Matt Ellis
24	GK	NZL	Cameron Brown
25	DF	JPN	Takuya Iwata

== Flamengo ==
Manager: (Portugal) Vítor Pereira

Note: Flags indicate national team as defined under FIFA eligibility rules; some limited exceptions apply. Players may hold more than one non-FIFA nationality.

No.	Pos.	Nation	Player
1	GK	BRA	Santos
2	DF	URU	Guillermo Varela
3	DF	BRA	Rodrigo Caio
4	DF	BRA	Léo Pereira
5	MF	CHI	Erick Pulgar
6	DF	BRA	Ayrton Lucas
7	MF	BRA	Éverton Ribeiro
8	MF	BRA	Thiago Maia
9	FW	BRA	Pedro
10	FW	BRA	Gabriel Barbosa
11	FW	BRA	Everton
14	MF	URU	Giorgian de Arrascaeta

No.	Pos.	Nation	Player
15	DF	BRA	Fabrício Bruno
16	DF	BRA	Filipe Luís
20	MF	BRA	Gerson
23	DF	BRA	David Luiz
25	GK	BRA	Matheus Cunha
30	DF	BRA	Pablo
31	FW	BRA	Marinho
32	MF	CHI	Arturo Vidal
34	DF	BRA	Matheuzinho
42	MF	BRA	Matheus França
45	GK	BRA	Hugo Souza

== Real Madrid ==
Manager: (Italy) Carlo Ancelotti

Note: Flags indicate national team as defined under FIFA eligibility rules; some limited exceptions apply. Players may hold more than one non-FIFA nationality.

No.	Pos.	Nation	Player
2	DF	ESP	Dani Carvajal
3	DF	BRA	Éder Militão
4	DF	AUT	David Alaba
5	DF	ESP	Jesús Vallejo
6	DF	ESP	Nacho
8	MF	GER	Toni Kroos
9	FW	FRA	Karim Benzema
10	MF	CRO	Luka Modrić
11	FW	ESP	Marco Asensio
12	MF	FRA	Eduardo Camavinga
13	GK	UKR	Andriy Lunin
15	MF	URU	Federico Valverde

No.	Pos.	Nation	Player
16	DF	ESP	Álvaro Odriozola
18	MF	FRA	Aurélien Tchouaméni
19	MF	ESP	Dani Ceballos
20	FW	BRA	Vinícius Júnior
21	FW	BRA	Rodrygo
22	DF	GER	Antonio Rüdiger
24	FW	DOM	Mariano Díaz
26	GK	ESP	Luis López
30	GK	ESP	Lucas Cañizares
31	MF	ESP	Mario Martín
33	MF	ESP	Sergio Arribas

== Seattle Sounders ==
Manager: (United States) Brian Schmetzer

Note: Flags indicate national team as defined under FIFA eligibility rules; some limited exceptions apply. Players may hold more than one non-FIFA nationality.

No.	Pos.	Nation	Player
3	DF	ECU	Xavier Arreaga
5	DF	CMR	Nouhou Tolo
6	MF	BRA	João Paulo
7	MF	USA	Cristian Roldan
9	FW	PER	Raúl Ruidíaz
10	MF	URU	Nicolás Lodeiro
11	MF	SVK	Albert Rusnák
12	FW	COL	Fredy Montero
13	FW	USA	Jordan Morris
16	DF	ESA	Alex Roldan
19	FW	BRA	Héber
22	MF	USA	Kelyn Rowe

No.	Pos.	Nation	Player
23	MF	BRA	Léo Chú
24	GK	SUI	Stefan Frei
25	DF	USA	Jackson Ragen
28	DF	COL	Yeimar Gómez Andrade
29	GK	USA	Jacob Castro
30	GK	USA	Stefan Cleveland
45	MF	USA	Ethan Dobbelaere
75	MF	USA	Danny Leyva
84	MF	USA	Josh Atencio
92	DF	FRA	Abdoulaye Cissoko
99	FW	USA	Dylan Teves

== Wydad Casablanca ==
Manager: (Tunisia) Mehdi Nafti

Note: Flags indicate national team as defined under FIFA eligibility rules; some limited exceptions apply. Players may hold more than one non-FIFA nationality.

No.	Pos.	Nation	Player
1	GK	MAR	Yanis Henin
2	MF	MAR	Ismail Moutaraji
3	DF	ALG	Houcine Benayada
4	DF	MAR	Amine Aboulfath
5	MF	MAR	Yahya Jabrane
6	MF	MAR	Jalal Daoudi
8	MF	MAR	Reda Jaadi
9	FW	CMR	Didier Lamkel Zé
10	MF	MAR	Ayman El Hassouni
11	FW	MAR	Mohamed Ounajem
13	MF	MAR	Abdellah Haimoud
14	DF	MAR	Yahia Attiyat Allah

No.	Pos.	Nation	Player
17	FW	MAR	Badie Aouk
20	FW	SEN	Bouly Sambou
22	DF	MAR	Ayoub El Amloud
23	FW	MAR	Hicham Boussefiane
25	DF	MAR	Amine Farhane
26	GK	MAR	Ahmed Reda Tagnaouti
30	FW	MAR	Saifeddine Bouhra
31	MF	MAR	Hamza Ait Allal
32	GK	MAR	Youssef El Motie
33	FW	MAR	Hamid Ahadad
35	DF	COD	Arsène Zola
