= 2023 Egyptian Super Cup =

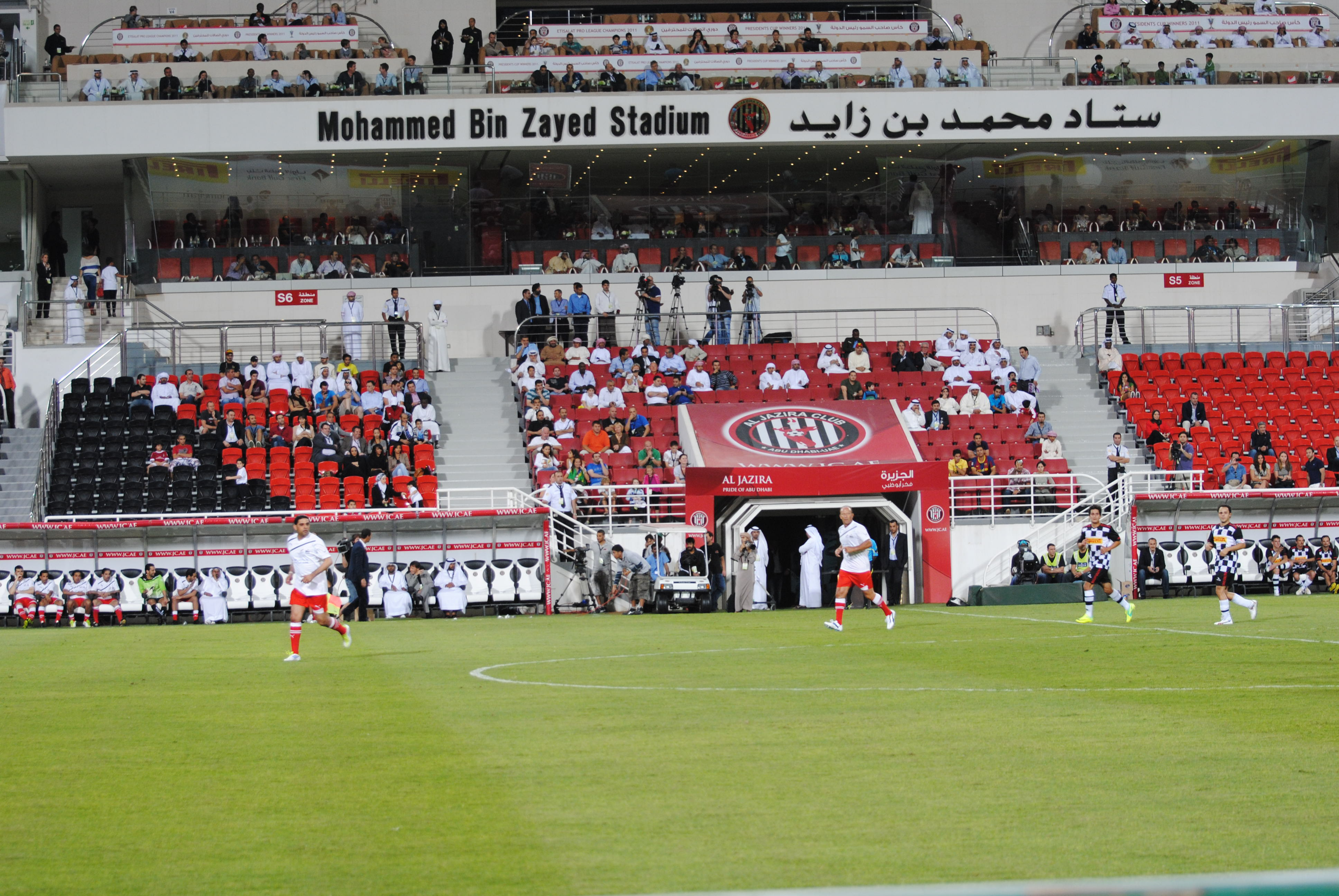
- Mohammed Bin Zayed stadium hosted the match
| Pyramids | Al Ahly |
| 0 | 1 |
- After extra time
- Date: 5 May 2023
- Venue: Mohammed bin Zayed Stadium, Abu Dhabi
- Man of the Match: Mohamed El Shenawy
- Referee: Mahmoud El Banna (Egypt)
- Attendance: 35,000

The 2023 Egyptian Super Cup was the 20th Egyptian Super Cup, an annual football match between the winners of the previous season's Egyptian Premier League and Egypt Cup. The match is usually contested by the winners of the Egyptian League and the Egypt Cup, but after the withdrawal of Zamalek. Pyramids qualified by default as the runners-up of the cup, and Al Ahly after winning the ( 2021–22 Egypt Cup) . The match was played on 5 May 2023 and for the 6th time in the United Arab Emirates at the Mohammed bin Zayed Stadium in Abu Dhabi. Al Ahly won the match 1–0 after extra time.

== Details ==
5 May 2023
21:00 GST

| Pyramids | 0–1 (a.e.t.) | Al Ahly |
|---|---|---|
| | Report | Ali Maaloul ET 96' (pen.) |

Mohammed bin Zayed Stadium, Abu Dhabi
Attendance: 35,000
Referee: Mahmoud El Banna (Egypt)

| Pyramids | Al Ahly |

| GK | 1 | (Egypt) Ahmed El Shenawy |
| RB | 24 | (Morocco) Mohamed Chibi | (yellow card) 99' |
| CB | 5 | (Egypt) Ali Gabr(c) |
| CB | 4 | (Egypt) Ahmed Samy | | (substituted off) 106' |
| LB | 21 | (Egypt) Mohamed Hamdi | | (substituted off) 91' |
| CM | 12 | (Egypt) Ahmed Tawfik |
| CM | 18 | (Morocco) Walid El Karti | | (substituted off) 120' |
| RW | 11 | (Egypt) Mostafa Fathi | | (substituted off) 91' |
| AM | 10 | (Egypt) Ramadan Sobhi |
| LW | 30 | (Egypt) Ibrahim Adel | | (substituted off) 67' |
| CF | 23 | (South Africa) Fagrie Lakay | | (substituted off) 82' |
Substitutes:
| GK | 25 | (Egypt) Ahmed Daador |
| DF | 24 | (Egypt) Ahmed Fathy |
| DF | 29 | (Egypt) Karim Hafez | | (substituted in) 91' |
| MF | 7 | (Burkina Faso) Blati Touré | (yellow card) 99' | (substituted in) 67' |
| MF | 13 | (Egypt) Dunga |
| MF | 33 | (Egypt) Mahmoud Saber | | (substituted in) 120' |
| FW | 8 | (Egypt) Islam Issa | | (substituted in) 91' |
| FW | 26 | (Egypt) Mohamed El Gabbas | | (substituted in) 106' |
| FW | 28 | (Tunisia) Fakhreddine Ben Youssef | (yellow card) 111' | (substituted in) 82' |
Manager:
(Portugal) Jaime Pacheco

| GK | 1 | (Egypt) Mohamed El Shenawy (c) |
| RB | 30 | (Egypt) Mohamed Hany | | (substituted off) 70' |
| CB | 4 | (Egypt) Mahmoud Metwalli |
| CB | 24 | (Egypt) Mohamed Abdelmonem |
| LB | 21 | (Tunisia) Ali Maâloul |
| CM | 8 | (Egypt) Hamdy Fathy | (yellow card) 99' | (substituted off) 106' |
| CM | 13 | (Egypt) Marwan Attia |
| RW | 23 | (South Africa) Percy Tau | | (substituted off) 106' |
| AM | 26 | (Algeria) Ahmed Kendouci | | (substituted off) 76' |
| LW | 9 | (Egypt) Ahmed Abdelkader | | (substituted off) 70' |
| CF | 10 | (Egypt) Mohamed Sherif | (yellow card) 41' | (substituted off) 76' |
Substitutes:
| GK | 16 | (Egypt) Ali Lotfi |
| DF | 2 | (Egypt) Khaled Abdelfattah | | (substituted in) 70' |
| MF | 15 | (Mali) Aliou Dieng | | (substituted in) 106' |
| MF | 19 | (Egypt) Afsha | | (substituted in) 76' |
| MF | 34 | (Egypt) Mohamed Fakhri |
| MF | 36 | (Egypt) Ahmed Nabil Koka |
| FW | 7 | (Egypt) Mahmoud Kahraba | | (substituted in) 76' |
| FW | 14 | (Egypt) Hussein El Shahat | | (substituted in) 70' |
| FW | 27 | (Egypt) Taher Mohamed | (yellow card) 111' | (substituted in) 106' |
Manager:
(Switzerland) Marcel Koller

Match officials:

- Assistant referees:
  - Ahmed Tawfeek Telb (Egypt)
  - Hany Abdelfattah (Egypt)
- Fourth official: Ahmed Issa Darweesh (UAE)
- Video assistant referee (VAR): Omar Mohamed Al Ali (UAE)

Match rules

- 90 minutes.
- 30 minutes of extra time if necessary.
- Penalty shoot-out if scores still level.
- Nine named substitutes, of which up to five may be used.
