= Ziad Tarek =

Egyptian footballer (born 2000)

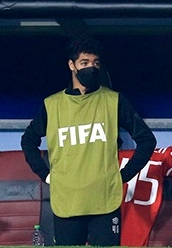
- Ziad Tarek with Al Ahly in 2021 FIFA Club World Cup

Personal information
- Full name: Ziad Tarek Mohamed Farag
- Date of birth: 6 September 2000 (age 26)
- Place of birth: Cairo, Egypt
- Height: 1.75 m (5 ft 9 in)
- Position: Winger

Team information
- Current team: We SC

Youth career
- 2009–2010: ENPPI
- 2010–2021: Al Ahly

Senior career*
Years	Team	Apps	(Gls)
2021–2023	Al Ahly	15	(2)
2021	→ Ismaily (loan)	3	(0)
2023	→ Smouha (loan)	8	(0)
2023–2024	ENPPI	0	(0)
2024	→ El Dakhleya (loan)	12	(0)
2025–2026	Haras El Hodoud	11	(0)
2026-	We SC	0	(0)
- * Club domestic league appearances and goals as of 16 August 2026

Ziad Tarek Mohamed Farag (Arabic: زياد طارق محمد فرج; born 6 September 2000) is an Egyptian professional footballer who plays as a winger for We SC.

== Club career ==
Born in the Egyptian capital of Cairo, Tarek began his career with ENPPI in the 2009–2010 season. After a year without being officially registered, he joined Al Ahly at the age of ten, a week after leaving ENPPI. He spent a brief loan spell with Ismaily before making his debut for Al Ahly in a 0–0 Egyptian League Cup draw with El Gouna as the squad had been hit by a Coronavirus outbreak as well as call ups for the 2021 Africa Cup of Nations. During his time with Al Ahly, he was seen as a successor to teammate Walid Soliman.

Having been unable to secure a place in the Al Ahly first team, despite featuring a number of times, he was loaned to Smouha in January 2023. However, shortly after joining, it was reported that Smouha manager Tarek El Ashry had informed Tarek that he would not feature in games as he did not want him at the club. El Ashry later clarified that he had told Tarek that he would have to fight for his place in the team, as he already had two good players in his position.

Tarek would later reveal in an interview with Sada El-Balad that after the rift with Tarek El Ashry at Smouha, he had remained with the club despite receiving offers from Ceramica Cleopatra and Al Ittihad, after receiving guarantees from Smouha president Mohamed Farag Amer that he was wanted at the club. After eight league appearances with Smouha, he returned to Al Ahly, but was signed on a free transfer by ENPPI in September 2023, after Al Ahly informed him he there was no place for him at the club.

Unable to break into the ENPPI first team, he was loaned to El Dakhleya, but again featured sparsely, later stating in the same interview with Sada El-Balad that the club did not make team selections based on merit, and rather would rely on individual's influences. Linked with a move to Zamalek, he would instead join Haras El Hodoud in early 2025.

== Career statistics ==
=== Club ===
As of 14 May 2025.

Appearances and goals by club, season and competition
Club	Season	League			National Cup (Note: Includes Egypt Cup)		League Cup (Note: Includes Egyptian League Cup)		Continental		Other		Total	
Club	Season	Division	Apps	Goals	Apps	Goals	Apps	Goals	Apps	Goals	Apps	Goals	Apps	Goals
Al Ahly	2020–21	Egyptian Premier League	0	0	1	0	0	0	0	0	0	0	1	0
Al Ahly	2021–22	Egyptian Premier League	14	2	2	0	5	1	0	0	0	0	21	3
Al Ahly	Total		14	2	3	0	5	1	0	0	0	0	22	3
Ismaily (loan)	2020–21	Egyptian Premier League	3	0	0	0	0	0	–		0	0	3	0
Smouha (loan)	2022–23	Egyptian Premier League	8	0	0	0	0	0	—				8	0
ENPPI	2023–24	Egyptian Premier League	0	0	2	0	0	0	—				2	0
El Dakhleya (loan)	2023–24	Egyptian Premier League	12	0	1	1	0	0	—				13	1
Haras El Hodoud	2024–25	Egyptian Premier League	4	0	0	0	0	0	—				4	0
Career total			41	2	6	1	5	1	0	0	0	0	52	4

== Honours ==
Al Ahly

- FIFA Club World Cup:Third-Place 2021
- Egypt Cup: 2021–22
