= Ahmed Sayed Gharib =

Egyptian footballer (born 2002)

Personal information
- Date of birth: 23 February 2002 (age 24)
- Place of birth: Cairo, Egypt
- Position: Forward

Team information
- Current team: ZED (on loan from Al Ahly)

Youth career
- –2021: Al Ahly

Senior career*
Years	Team	Apps	(Gls)
2021–	Al Ahly	5	(3)
2022–2023	→ Al Ittihad Alexandria (loan)	4	(0)
2023–	→ ZED (loan)	0	(0)
- * Club domestic league appearances and goals as of 8 August 2022

Ahmed Sayed (Arabic: احمد سيد; born 23 February 2002) is an Egyptian professional footballer who plays as a forward for ZED on loan from Al Ahly.

== Career ==
On 7 August 2022, Ahmed scored two goals against Al Ittihad Alexandria on his league debut.

== Career statistics ==
=== Club ===
As of 8 August 2022

Appearances and goals by club, season and competition
Club	Season	League			Cup		Continental		Other		Total	
Club	Season	Division	Apps	Goals	Apps	Goals	Apps	Goals	Apps	Goals	Apps	Goals
Al Ahly	2021–22	Egyptian Premier League	5	3	0	0	0	0	3	1	8	4
Al Ittihad Alexandria (loan)	2022–23	Egyptian Premier League	4	0	0	0	0	0	0	0	4	0
ZED (loan)	2022–23	Egyptian Second Division	0	0	0	0	0	0	0	0	0	0
Career total			9	3	0	0	0	0	3	1	12	4

== Honours ==
Al Ahly

- Egypt Cup: 2021–22
