= Mohamed El Shenawy =

Egyptian footballer (born 1988)

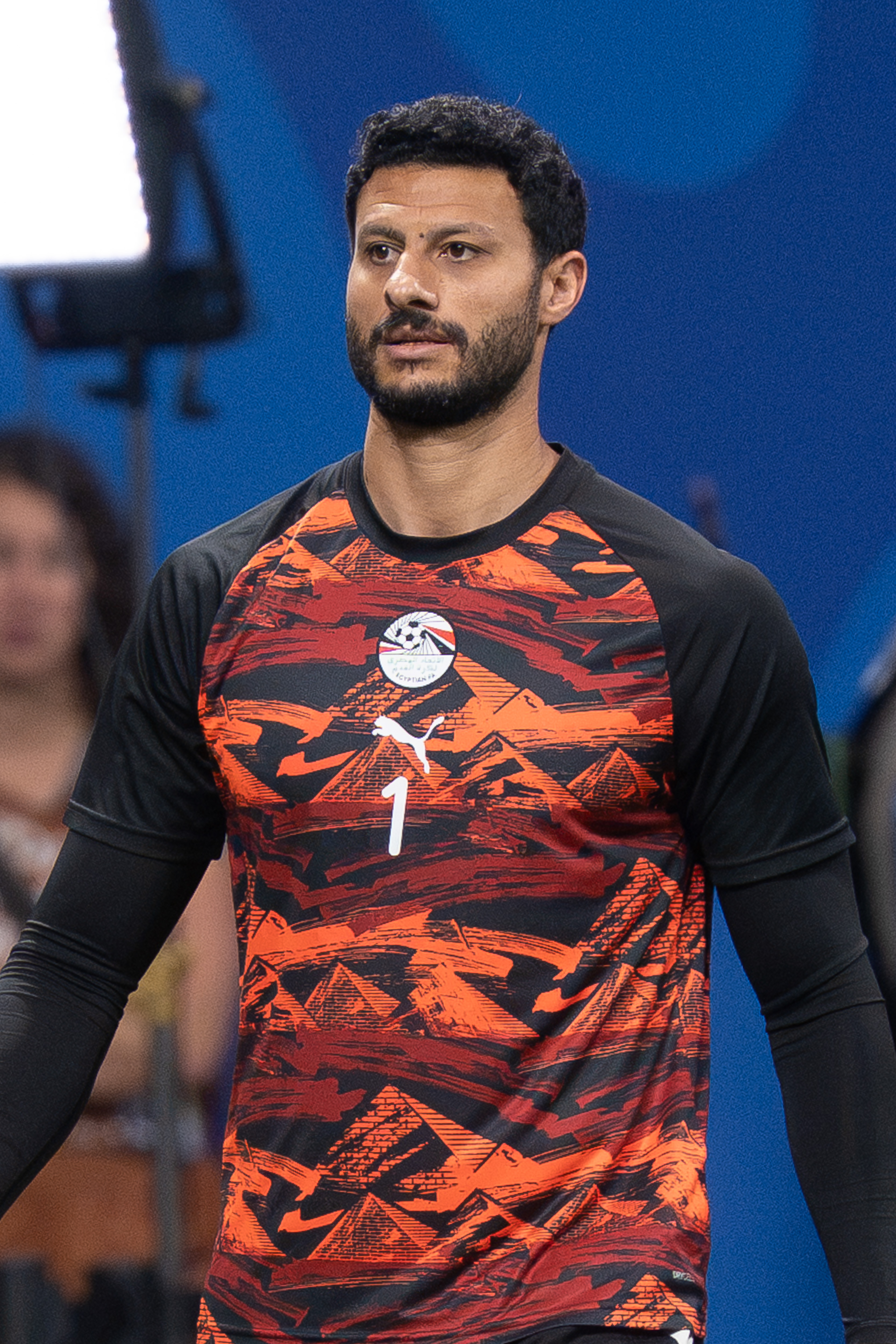
- El Shenawy with Egypt in 2026

Personal information
- Full name: Mohamed El Sayed Mohamed El Shenawy Gomaa
- Date of birth: 18 December 1988 (age 37)
- Place of birth: El Hamool, Kafr El Sheikh, Egypt
- Height: 1.91 m (6 ft 3 in)
- Position: Goalkeeper

Team information
- Current team: Al Ahly
- Number: 1

Youth career
- –2002: El Hamoul
- 2002–2009: Al Ahly

Senior career*
Years	Team	Apps	(Gls)
2007–2008	Al Ahly	1	(0)
2009–2013	Tala'ea El-Gaish	43	(0)
2012–2013	→ Haras El-Hodoud (loan)	15	(0)
2013–2016	Petrojet	82	(0)
2016–	Al Ahly	300	(0)

International career^{‡}
2021	Egypt Olympic (O.P.)	4	(0)
2018–	Egypt	77	(0)
Medal record
Representing Egypt
Men's football
Africa Cup of Nations
Runner-up	2021 Cameroon
- * Club domestic league appearances and goals as of 4 October 2025 ‡ National team caps and goals as of 28 May 2026

Mohamed El Sayed Mohamed El Shenawy Gomaa (Note: Arabic: محمد السيد محمد الشناوي جمعة) (born 18 December 1988) is an Egyptian professional footballer who plays as a goalkeeper for Egyptian Premier League club Al Ahly, which he captains, and the Egypt national team.

El Shenawy began his career as a youth player with Al Ahly but was released in 2009, joining Tala'ea El Gaish. He spent time on loan with Haras El-Hodoud before joining Petrojet in 2013. He returned to Al Ahly in July 2016 and then displaced Sherif Ekramy; he is considered one of the best goalkeepers in Africa. He helped the club win four consecutive Egyptian Premier League titles (2016–17, 2017–18, 2018–19 and 2019–20) and two consecutive CAF Champions League titles (2019–20 and 2020–21).

El Shenawy made his international debut for Egypt in March 2018 in a friendly match. He was selected as the starting goalkeeper for their squad at the 2018 FIFA World Cup, playing in their opening two matches.

== Club career ==
El-Shenawy began his career in the youth system at his hometown club El-Hamoul SC before moving to Al Ahly, joining the club at the age of fourteen in 2002. He failed to make a league appearance for the senior squad before being released by the club in 2009. Following his release, he joined fellow Egyptian Premier League side Tala'ea El Gaish. During his time with El Gaish, El Shenawy spent time on loan with Haras El-Hodood.

Mohamed El-Shenawy joined Petrojet in 2013. His form during the 2015–16 season, keeping a joint league-high eleven clean sheets in twenty-two appearances, including a run of seven matches without conceding, led his former club Al Ahly to attempt to resign him after attracting the attention of manager Martin Jol.

El-Shenawy rejoined Al-Ahly in July 2016, establishing himself in the first team over Sherif Ekramy after keeping five clean sheets in seven matches during January 2018, including helping the side to a 1–0 victory over Al-Masry in the 2017 Egyptian Super Cup. He also recorded the highest percentage of clean sheets by any goalkeeper in the Egyptian Premier League. In his first four seasons, El-Shenawy helped the club win the Egyptian Premier League in consecutive seasons. He also won the 2019–20 CAF Champions League to participate in the 2020 FIFA Club World Cup, in which he managed in the 3rd place playoff, to save two penalties in the 3–2 penalty shootout win over Palmeiras, as the game ended 0–0 after 90 minutes and extra time. In the first match of 2025 FIFA Club World Cup against Inter Miami, El-Shenawy produced a number of saves, including a long shot from Lionel Messi in the final minutes of the game, as the match ended in a goalless draw.

== International career ==
For the national team, Mohamed El-Shenawy represented Egypt at the under-18 level and later played for the Egypt national under-20 football team in the 2007 African Youth Championship. From 2013, he received several call-ups to the senior Egypt side before making his international debut in a 2–1 friendly defeat against Portugal. He earned praise for his performance in the match, with national team goalkeeping coach Ahmed Nagy commenting "He had a great game; I am so happy with his performance He deserves to be with the national team."

In May 2018, he was named in Egypt's preliminary squad for the 2018 FIFA World Cup in Russia. He played in warm up friendly matches against Colombia and Belgium prior to the tournament and was chosen as the starting goalkeeper for their opening match of the tournament against Uruguay, winning only his fourth cap, ahead of Essam El-Hadary and club teammate Ekramy. He was named Man of the Match in the first match after making several saves during a 1–0 defeat however, he declined to accept the award in the players' tunnel after the match due to its sponsorship by Budweiser and was only photographed with the award. As a Muslim, El-Shenawy is forbidden from drinking alcohol. Teammate Ekramy and Egyptian team director Ihab Leheta later attempted to persuade him to accept the award as a "historic" prize, but he again refused.

He retained his place for Egypt's second group match as they were eliminated after suffering a 3–1 defeat to hosts Russia. He was included in Egypt's squad for the 2021 Africa Cup of Nations, where the team reached the final but lost to Senegal in a penalty shootout.

On 2 December 2025, El Shenawy was called up to the Egypt squad for the 2025 Africa Cup of Nations. He was named in the 26-man squad for the 2026 FIFA World Cup, marking his second World Cup selection, a record he shared with Mohamed Salah and Trézéguet.

== Career statistics ==
=== Club ===
As of match played 23 June 2025

Appearances and goals by club, season and competition
Club	Season	League			National cup		Continental		Other		Total	
Club	Season	Division	Apps	Goals	Apps	Goals	Apps	Goals	Apps	Goals	Apps	Goals
Al Ahly	2007–08	Egyptian Premier League	1	0	0	0	0	0	0	0	1	0
Tala'ea El-Gaish	2009–10	Egyptian Premier League	21	0	2	0	—		—		23	0
Tala'ea El-Gaish	2010–11	Egyptian Premier League	19	0	0	0	—		—		19	0
Tala'ea El-Gaish	2011–12	Egyptian Premier League	3	0	0	0	—		—		3	0
Tala'ea El-Gaish	Total		44	0	2	0	0	0	0	0	46	0
Haras El-Hodoud (loan)	2012–13	Egyptian Premier League	15	0	0	0	—		—		15	0
Petrojet	2013–14	Egyptian Premier League	20	0	1	0	—		3 (Note: Appearances in the Championship playoffs)	0	24	0
Petrojet	2014–15	Egyptian Premier League	28	0	2	0	—		—		30	0
Petrojet	2015–16	Egyptian Premier League	34	0	0	0	—		—		34	0
Petrojet	Total		97	0	3	0	0	0	3	0	103	0
Al Ahly	2016–17	Egyptian Premier League	3	0	3	0	0	0	0	0	6	0
Al Ahly	2017–18	Egyptian Premier League	23	0	3	0	14 (Note: Appearances in CAF Champions League)	0	1 (Note: Appearance in Egyptian Super Cup)	0	41	0
Al Ahly	2018–19	Egyptian Premier League	23	0	1	0	8	0	1	0	33	0
Al Ahly	2019–20	Egyptian Premier League	30	0	3	0	13	0	1	0	47	0
Al Ahly	2020–21	Egyptian Premier League	26	0	4	0	12	0	5 (Note: One appearance in Egyptian Super Cup, one appearance in CAF Super Cup, and three appearances in FIFA Club World Cup)	0	47	0
Al Ahly	2021–22	Egyptian Premier League	24	0	3	0	10	0	2 (Note: One appearance in Egyptian Super Cup, and one appearance in CAF Super Cup)	0	39	0
Al Ahly	2022–23	Egyptian Premier League	29	0	4	0	12	0	5 (Note: One appearance in Egyptian Super Cup, and four appearances in FIFA Club World Cup)	0	50	0
Al Ahly	2023–24	Egyptian Premier League	17	0	—		9 (Note: Five appearances in CAF Champions league, and four appearances in the African Football League)	0	5 (Note: One appearance in Egyptian Super Cup, one appearance in CAF Super Cup, and three appearances in FIFA Club World Cup)	0	31	0
Al Ahly	2024–25	Egyptian Premier League	18	0	—		11	0	7 (Note: One appearance in Egyptian Super Cup, one appearance in CAF Super Cup, two appearances in FIFA Intercontinental Cup, and three appearances in FIFA Club World Cup)	0	36	0
Al Ahly	Total		193	0	21	0	89	0	27	0	330	0
Career total			334	0	26	0	89	0	30	0	495	0

=== International ===
As of match played 28 May 2026

Appearances and goals by national team and year
National team	Year	Apps	Goals
Egypt	2018	9 (Note: Two appearances in 2018 FIFA World Cup)	0
Egypt	2019	9 (Note: Four appearances in 2019 Africa Cup of Nations)	0
Egypt	2020	2	0
Egypt	2021	15 (Note: Six appearances in 2021 FIFA Arab Cup)	0
Egypt	2022	10 (Note: Four appearances in 2021 Africa Cup of Nations)	0
Egypt	2023	8	0
Egypt	2024	10 (Note: Three appearances in 2023 Africa Cup of Nations)	0
Egypt	2025	9 (Note: Two appearances in 2025 Africa Cup of Nations)	0
Egypt	2026	5 (Note: Three appearances in 2025 Africa Cup of Nations)	0
Total		77	0

== Honours ==
Al Ahly

- Egyptian Premier League: 2007–08, 2016–17, 2017–18, 2018–19, 2019–20, 2022–23, 2023–24
- Egypt Cup: 2016–17, 2019–20, 2021–22, 2022–23
- Egyptian Super Cup: 2018, 2019, 2022, 2023, 2023–24, 2024
- CAF Champions League: 2019–20, 2020–21, 2022–23, 2023-24
- CAF Super Cup: 2021 (May), 2021 (Dec)
- FIFA African–Asian–Pacific Cup: 2024

Individual

- African Inter-Club Player of the Year: 2022
- Africa Cup of Nations Group Stage Best XI: 2025
