= Mostafa El Badry =

Egyptian footballer (born 1997)

Personal information
- Full name: Mostafa El Badry
- Date of birth: 21 May 1997 (age 29)
- Place of birth: Aswan, Egypt
- Position: Attacking midfielder

Team information
- Current team: Petrojet SC
- Number: 19

Senior career*
Years	Team	Apps	(Gls)
–2017	KIMA Aswan		
2017–2018	Aswan	22	(1)
2018–2019	Al Ahly	0	(0)
2019–2021	El Entag El Harby	29	(11)
2020	→ Aswan (loan)		
2021–2023	Al Ahly		
2021–2023	→ Future (loan)		
2023–2025	→ Smouha (loan)		
2025–	Petrojet		
- * Club domestic league appearances and goals as of August 10, 2025

Mostafa El Badry (born 21 May 1997) is an Egyptian professional footballer who plays for Egyptian Premier League club Petrojet SC.
