= Ali Maâloul =

Tunisian footballer (born 1990)

Ali Maâloul عَلِيّ مَعْلُول
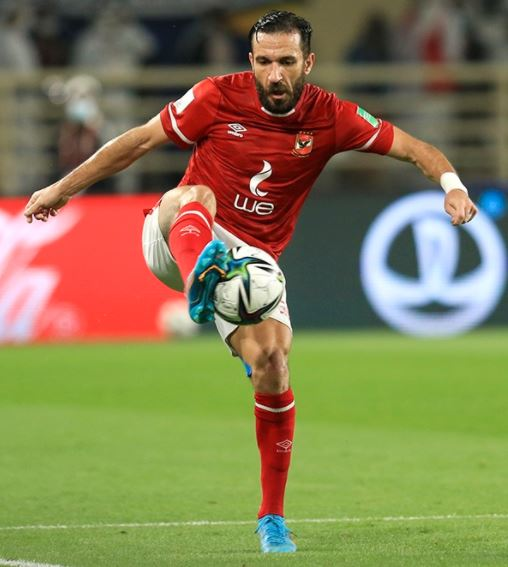
- Maâloul with Al Ahly at the 2021 FIFA Club World Cup

Personal information
- Full name: Ali Maâloul
- Date of birth: 1 January 1990 (age 36)
- Place of birth: Sfax, Tunisia
- Height: 1.75 m (5 ft 9 in)
- Position: Left-back

Team information
- Current team: CS Sfaxien
- Number: 10

Youth career
- 2001–2009: CS Sfaxien

Senior career*
Years	Team	Apps	(Gls)
2009–2016	CS Sfaxien	157	(31)
2016–2025	Al Ahly	163	(35)
2025–	CS Sfaxien	25	(2)

International career^{‡}
2013–	Tunisia	89	(3)
Medal record
Representing Tunisia
FIFA Arab Cup
Runner-up	2021 Qatar
- * Club domestic league appearances and goals as of 4 September 2026 ‡ National team caps and goals as of 1 April 2024

Ali Maâloul (Arabic: عَلِيّ مَعْلُول; born 1 January 1990) is a Tunisian professional footballer who plays as a left-back for Tunisian Ligue Professionnelle 1 club CS Sfaxien and the Tunisia national team.

== Club career ==
Maâloul started his career with hometown club CS Sfaxien and became their captain from the 2014–15 season. In the 2015–16 season, he became the top scorer in the league with 14 goals in 20 matches, a record for a defender since none has scored more than nine goals in a season. At CS Sfaxien, he wore the number 10 shirt, unusual for his position.

On 25 July 2016, Maâloul signed a four-year contract with Al Ahly, becoming one of the Egyptian giants' key players on their way to conquering many tournaments. In August 2025, after nine years away, he rejoined CS Sfaxien.

== International career ==
On 6 July 2013, Maâloul made his debut Tunisia in a 1–0 loss to Morocco in the 2014 African Nations Championship qualification phase. He also participated in two editions of the Africa Cup of Nations in 2015 and 2017. In the 2015 edition, he played four matches as Tunisia lost in the quarter-finals to hosts Equatorial Guinea in extra time. In the 2017 edition, he played three matches as Tunisia went out again in the quarter-finals, this time to Burkina Faso.

Maâloul also represented Tunisia at the 2016 African Nations Championship, playing three matches. Tunisia continued their quarter-final disappointment by losing to Mali. He also played two matches at the 2018 FIFA World Cup in Russia against England (2–1) and Belgium (5–2).

== Career statistics ==
=== Club ===
As of 28 December 2023

Appearances and goals by club, season and competition
Club	Season	League			National cup		Continental		Other		Total	
Club	Season	Division	Apps	Goals	Apps	Goals	Apps	Goals	Apps	Goals	Apps	Goals
CS Sfaxien	2008–09	Tunisian Ligue Professionnelle 1	2	0	0	0	—		0	0	2	0
CS Sfaxien	2009–10	Tunisian Ligue Professionnelle 1	15	0	2	0	13	0	—		30	0
CS Sfaxien	2010–11	Tunisian Ligue Professionnelle 1	20	1	0	0	—		—		20	1
CS Sfaxien	2011–12	Tunisian Ligue Professionnelle 1	28	2	1	0	—		—		29	2
CS Sfaxien	2012–13	Tunisian Ligue Professionnelle 1	13	1	0	0	4	0	5	0	22	1
CS Sfaxien	2013–14	Tunisian Ligue Professionnelle 1	29	8	4	1	12	3	1	1	46	13
CS Sfaxien	2014–15	Tunisian Ligue Professionnelle 1	23	3	2	0	4	1	—		29	4
CS Sfaxien	2015–16	Tunisian Ligue Professionnelle 1	27	16	0	0	—		—		27	16
CS Sfaxien	Total		157	31	9	1	33	4	6	1	205	37
Al Ahly	2015–16	Egyptian Premier League	0	0	1	0	2	0	0	0	3	0
Al Ahly	2016–17	Egyptian Premier League	23	1	4	0	12	2	0	0	39	3
Al Ahly	2017–18	Egyptian Premier League	13	0	0	0	9	1	1	0	23	1
Al Ahly	2018–19	Egyptian Premier League	26	8	1	0	8	2	1	0	36	10
Al Ahly	2019–20	Egyptian Premier League	23	5	2	0	10	4	1	0	36	9
Al Ahly	2020–21	Egyptian Premier League	23	5	3	0	4	1	4	0	34	6
Al Ahly	2021–22	Egyptian Premier League	21	8	1	0	12	1	5	0	39	9
Al Ahly	2022–23	Egyptian Premier League	25	8	0	0	14	0	5	2	45	10
Al Ahly	2023–24	Egyptian Premier League	3	0	0	0	3	0	8	2	14	2
Al Ahly	Total		163	35	13	0	74	11	26	4	277	50
Career total			320	66	22	1	107	15	32	5	473	87

=== International ===
As of 12 November 2025

Appearances and goals by national team and year
National team	Year	Apps	Goals
Tunisia	2013	1	0
Tunisia	2014	7	0
Tunisia	2015	12	0
Tunisia	2016	11	0
Tunisia	2017	11	0
Tunisia	2018	8	0
Tunisia	2019	9	0
Tunisia	2020	4	1
Tunisia	2021	11	1
Tunisia	2022	10	0
Tunisia	2023	4	1
Tunisia	2024	2	0
Tunisia	2025	1	0
Total		91	3

As of 12 September 2023
Scores and results list Tunisia's goal tally first, score column indicates score after each Maâloul goal.

List of international goals scored by Ali Maâloul
No.	Date	Venue	Opponent	Score	Result	Competition
1	9 October 2020	Stade Olympique de Radès, Radès, Tunisia	Sudan	2–0	3–0	Friendly
2	16 November 2021	Stade Olympique de Radès, Radès, Tunisia	Zambia	3–0	3–1	2022 FIFA World Cup qualification
3	24 March 2023	Stade Olympique de Radès, Radès, Tunisia	Libya	2–0	3–0	2023 Africa Cup of Nations qualification

== Honours ==
CS Sfaxien

- Tunisian Ligue Professionnelle 1: 2012–13
- CAF Confederation Cup: 2013
- North African Cup Winners Cup: 2009

Al Ahly

- Egyptian Premier League: 2016–17, 2017–18, 2018–19, 2019–20, 2022–23, 2023–24, 2024–25
- Egypt Cup: 2016–17, 2019–20, 2021–22, 2022–23
- Egyptian Super Cup: 2018, 2019, 2022, 2023, 2023–24
- CAF Champions League: 2019–20, 2020–21, 2022–23, 2023–24
- CAF Super Cup: 2021 (May), 2021 (December)

Tunisia

- FIFA Arab Cup runner-up: 2021
- Kirin Cup Soccer: 2022

Individual

- Tunisian Ligue Professionnelle 1 top goalscorer: 2015–16
- CAF Team of the Year: 2017
- FIFA Club World Cup top goalscorer: 2023
