= Shady Radwan =

Egyptian footballer (born 2001)

Personal information
- Date of birth: 1 September 2001 (age 25)
- Place of birth: Mansoura, Egypt
- Height: 1.73 m (5 ft 8 in)
- Position: Winger

Youth career
- Al Ahly

Senior career*
Years	Team	Apps	(Gls)
2020–2024	Al Ahly	2	(0)
2020–2022	→ National Bank (loan)	5	(0)
2025–	Teem FC		
- * Club domestic league appearances and goals as of 16:53, 15 May 2025 (UTC)

Shady Radwan (Arabic: شَادِي رِضْوَان; born 1 September 2001) is an Egyptian professional footballer who plays as a winger.

== Club career ==
=== Al Ahly ===
==== Early career ====
Born in Mansoura, Radwan would play on the streets before his father's friends encouraged him to enrol in an academy. After being rejected by a number of academies, he joined Al Ahly's affiliate academy in Mansoura, and after just two-and-a-half months, he was moved to the main club's academy. Despite playing as a winger, he topped the youth league's scoring charts two years in a row.

In October 2018, he was named by English newspaper The Guardian in their "Next Generation 2018" list, highlighting the best young players born in 2001. In a youth match against Petrojet in October 2018, he suffered a broken collarbone, undergoing surgery before suffering the same injury in December of the same year, requiring another surgery.

The following year, his performances in Al Ahly's academy drew the attention of Emirati side Al Ain. Having rejected Al Ain's initially approach, the Emirati side showed interest in signing him again May 2020.

==== Loan to National Bank ====
He was promoted to the first team in July 2020, training with the senior squad for the first time. Having made his professional debut against Pyramids on 11 October 2020, and featuring in a 3–0 win against Tala'ea El Gaish later in the same month, he was loaned to fellow Egyptian Premier League side National Bank on 10 November of the same year.

His debut with National Bank was delayed after he contracted COVID-19 in December 2020. He eventually made his debut on 2 February 2021, in a 0–0 draw with Al Masry, and would go on to make a further six appearances in all competitions over the next two years, having renewed the loan for the 2021–22 season, before a return to Al Ahly in August 2022. In April 2022, while still on loan at National Bank, he was subject to interest from Al Ahly's rivals, Zamalek.

==== Return to Al Ahly ====
Following the death of his father in January 2022, Radwan struggled to come to terms with the loss, and missed a number of Egyptian League Cup games for Al Ahly - games he had been promised by his coach in order to gain match experience. In August of the same year, he was linked with a move away from the club, having rejected a loan return to National Bank, with Tala'ea El Gaish reported as having bid for Radwan. He returned to first-team training with Al Ahly in September 2022, with his future at the club uncertain and Egyptian Premier League sides ENPPI, El Mokawloon and Ismaily reported to have launched bids.

Despite Al Ahly reportedly recommending to head coach Marcel Koller that Radwan be allowed to leave in the summer of 2022, he remained with the club. In April 2023, he suffered a tear to his cruciate ligament and cartilage. With his contract set to expire in July 2023, Radwan remained with Al Ahly to continue his recovery from the injury, with the club reportedly looking to make a decision on his future following his return to training. In October of the same year, a source close to Radwan told Egyptian news website Masrawy that the player was still with Al Ahly, was still in rehabilitation and was expected to return to training in early 2024.

=== Ismaily ===
In October 2024, Radwan began training with Ismaily, with the club looking to sign him after resolving contract disputes with former players.

== Personal life ==
On 11 July 2020, while driving in Nasr City, Cairo, Radwan accidentally struck a woman with his car. Despite the woman initially surviving the collision, she would later die at the Nasr City Hospital, with her family requesting E£750,000 in compensation. On 3 November of the same year, Radwan was sentenced to one year in prison, having failed to attend the court sessions. In January 2021, the appellate court reversed the decision, after a reconciliation was reached.

== Career statistics ==
=== Club ===
As of 6 November 2023.

Appearances and goals by club, season and competition
Club	Season	League			Cup		Continental		Other		Total	
Club	Season	Division	Apps	Goals	Apps	Goals	Apps	Goals	Apps	Goals	Apps	Goals
Al Ahly	2019–20	Egyptian Premier League	2	0	0	0	0	0	0	0	2	0
Al Ahly	2020–21	Egyptian Premier League	0	0	0	0	0	0	0	0	0	0
Al Ahly	2021–22	Egyptian Premier League	0	0	0	0	0	0	0	0	0	0
Al Ahly	2022–23	Egyptian Premier League	0	0	0	0	0	0	0	0	0	0
Al Ahly	2023–24	Egyptian Premier League	0	0	0	0	0	0	0	0	0	0
Al Ahly	Total		2	0	0	0	0	0	0	0	2	0
National Bank (loan)	2020–21	Egyptian Premier League	3	0	1 (Note: Appearances in the Egypt Cup)	0	–		0	0	4	0
National Bank (loan)	2021–22	Egyptian Premier League	2	0	1	0	–		0	0	3	0
National Bank (loan)	Total		5	0	2	0	0	0	0	0	7	0
Career total			7	0	2	0	0	0	0	0	9	0
