= Ali Lotfi (footballer) =

Egyptian footballer (born 1989)

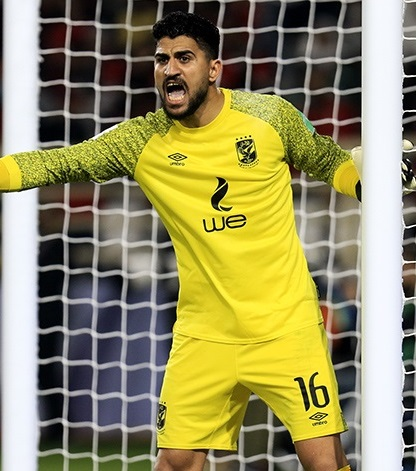
- Ali Lotfi playing for Al Ahly at the 2021 FIFA Club World Cup

Personal information
- Full name: Ali Lotfi Ibrahim Mostafa Swidan
- Date of birth: 14 October 1989 (age 37)
- Place of birth: Qalyubiyya, Egypt
- Height: 1.87 m (6 ft 2 in)
- Position: Goalkeeper

Team information
- Current team: ZED
- Number: 1

Senior career*
Years	Team	Apps	(Gls)
2009–2018	ENPPI	83	(0)
2018–2023	Al Ahly	29	(0)
2023–	ZED	62	(0)

International career
2009	Egypt U20	5	(0)
2010–2012	Egypt U23	5	(0)
2015	Egypt	1	(0)
- * Club domestic league appearances and goals as of 17 December 2025

Ali Lotfi Ibrahim Mostafa Swidan (Arabic: عَلِيّ لُطْفِيّ إِبْرَاهِيم مُصْطَفَى سُوَيْدَان; born 14 October 1989) is an Egyptian professional footballer who plays as a goalkeeper for ZED in the Egyptian Premier League.

== Club career ==
Lofti spent most of his playing career with ENPPI Club, but joined Al-Ahly to be the club's reserve goalkeeper. On April 18, 2021, he saved a penalty and a last minute header from Mahmoud Alaa and Al Ahly went on to win the Cairo derby against Zamalek 2–1.

== Honours ==
ENPPI

- Egypt Cup: 2010–11

Al Ahly

- Egyptian Premier League: 2017–18, 2018–19, 2019–20, 2022–23
- Egypt Cup: 2019–20, 2021–22, 2022–23
- Egyptian Super Cup: 2022, 2022–23
- CAF Champions League: 2019–20, 2020-21, 2022–23
- CAF Super Cup: 2021 (May), 2021 (December)
