= Khaled Abdelfattah =

Egyptian footballer (born 1999)

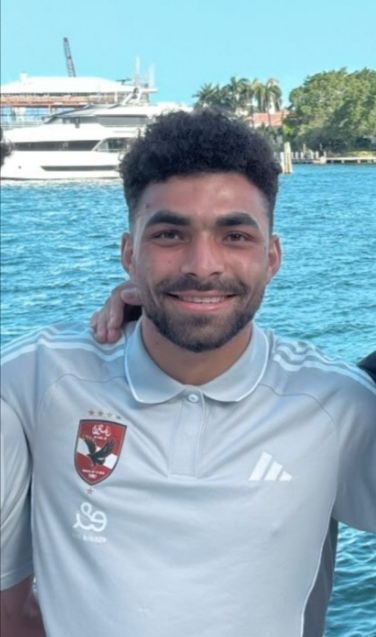
- Khaled Abdelfatah with Al Ahly in 2025

Personal information
- Full name: Khaled Mohamed Abdelfattah Ibrahim
- Date of birth: 22 January 1999 (age 27)
- Place of birth: Egypt
- Height: 1.73 m (5 ft 8 in)
- Position: Right-back

Team information
- Current team: Ceramica Cleopatra FC
- Number: 15

Youth career
- –2019: Smouha

Senior career*
Years	Team	Apps	(Gls)
2019–2023	Smouha	47	(2)
2023	→ Al Ahly (loan)	14	(0)
2023–2025	Al Ahly	12	(0)
2025-	Ceramica Cleopatra FC	2	(0)
- * Club domestic league appearances and goals as of 17 December 2025

Khaled Mohamed Abdelfattah Ibrahim (Arabic: خالد محمد عبدالفتاح إبراهيم; born 22 January 1999) is an Egyptian footballer who plays as a right-back for Egyptian Premier League club Al Ahly.

== Career statistics ==
=== Club ===
As of match played 12 March 2024.

Appearances and goals by club, season and competition
Club	Season	League			National Cup		Continental		Other		Total	
Club	Season	Division	Apps	Goals	Apps	Goals	Apps	Goals	Apps	Goals	Apps	Goals
Smouha	2019–20	Egyptian Premier League	8	0	0	0	—		—		8	0
Smouha	2020–21	Egyptian Premier League	1	0	1	0	—		—		2	0
Smouha	2021–22	Egyptian Premier League	28	2	2	0	—		—		30	2
Smouha	2022–23	Egyptian Premier League	10	0	0	0	—		—		10	0
Smouha	Total		47	2	3	0	0	0	—		50	2
Al Ahly	2022–23	Egyptian Premier League	14	0	3	0	6	0	2	0	25	0
Al Ahly	2023-24	Egyptian Premier League	2	0	—		1	0	2	0	5	0
Al Ahly	Total		16	0	3	0	7	0	4	0	30	0
Career Total			63	2	3	0	7	0	4	0	80	2

== Honours ==
Al Ahly

- Egyptian Premier League: 2022–23
- Egypt Cup: 2021–22, 2022–23
- Egyptian Super Cup: 2022-23, 2023–24
- CAF Champions League: 2022–23, 2023-24
- FIFA African–Asian–Pacific Cup: 2024
