= Mohamed Fakhri =

Egyptian footballer (born 1999)

Personal information
- Full name: Mohamed Fakhri Mahmoud Mahmoud Ramadan
- Date of birth: March 4, 1999 (age 27)
- Place of birth: Egypt
- Height: 1.83 m (6 ft 0 in)
- Position: Attacking midfielder

Team information
- Current team: Pharco FC
- Number: 14

Senior career*
Years	Team	Apps	(Gls)
2017–2018	Ghazl El Mahalla		
2018–2023	Al Ahly	22	(0)
2020–2021	→ National Bank of Egypt (loan)	6	(0)
2023-	Pharco FC	27	(2)
- * Club domestic league appearances and goals

Mohamed Fakhri Mahmoud Mahmoud Ramadan (Arabic: محمد فخري محمود محمود رمضان) (born March 4, 1999) is an Egyptian professional footballer who plays as an attacking midfielder for Egyptian Premier League club Al Ahly.

== Honours ==
Al Ahly

- Egyptian Premier League: 2017–18, 2018–19, 2019–20, 2022–23
- Egypt Cup: 2019–20, 2021–22
- Egyptian Super Cup: 2017–18, 2021–22, 2022–23
- CAF Super Cup: 2021 (Dec)
- CAF Champions League: 2019–20, 2022–23
