= Salah Atef =

Egyptian footballer (born 1991)

Rico
Personal information
- Full name: Salah Eldin Atef Salah Eldin
- Date of birth: 6 February 1991 (age 35)
- Place of birth: Cairo, Egypt
- Height: 1.84 m (6 ft 0 in)
- Position: Defensive midfielder

Team information
- Current team: Ghazl El Mahalla
- Number: 6

Senior career*
Years	Team	Apps	(Gls)
2013–2016	Ittihad El Shorta	76	(15)
2016–2017	Zamalek	13	(1)
2017–2020	Misr Lel Makkasa	78	(3)
2020–2022	ENPPI	31	(2)
2022–	Ghazl El Mahalla	7	(0)
- * Club domestic league appearances and goals as of 18:45, 20 November 2025 (UTC)

Salah Eldin Atef Salah Eldin (Arabic: صلاح الدين عاطف صلاح الدين) commonly known as Rico (born 6 February 1991) is an Egyptian footballer who plays as a defensive midfielder for Ghazl El Mahalla of Egypt. In 2016, he signed with Zamalek SC.
