= Ramy Rabia =

Egyptian footballer (born 1993)

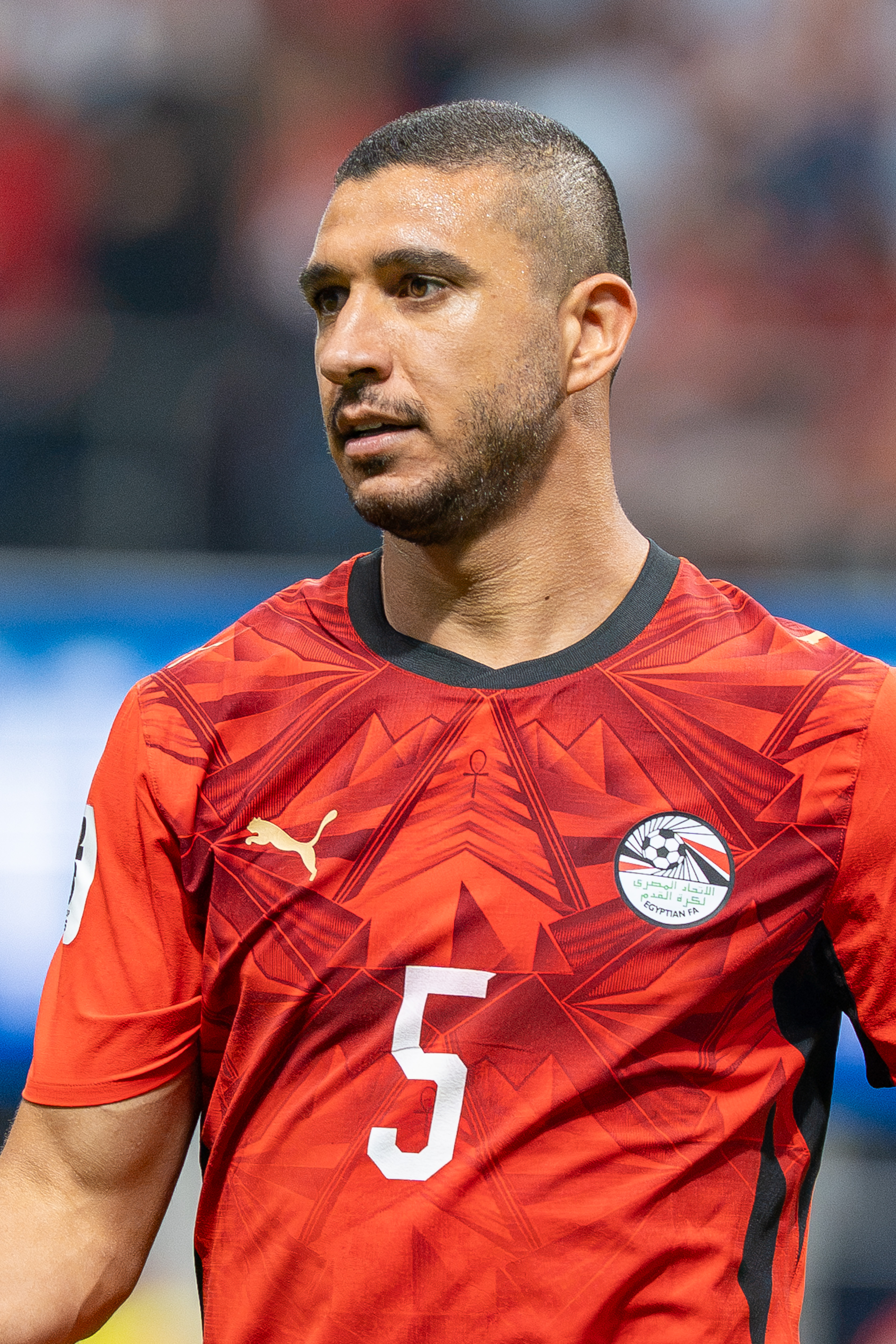
- Rabia with Egypt in 2026

Personal information
- Full name: Ramy Hisham Abdel Aziz Moustafa Rabia
- Date of birth: 20 May 1993 (age 33)
- Place of birth: Cairo, Egypt
- Height: 1.83 m (6 ft 0 in)
- Position: Centre-back

Team information
- Current team: Al Ain
- Number: 25

Youth career
- 2003–2010: Al Ahly

Senior career*
Years	Team	Apps	(Gls)
2010–2014	Al Ahly	26	(2)
2014–2015	Sporting CP	0	(0)
2014–2015	Sporting CP B	21	(0)
2015–2025	Al Ahly	162	(9)
2025–	Al Ain	11	(0)

International career^{‡}
2011–2013	Egypt U20	12	(1)
2014–2015	Egypt U23	5	(1)
2012–	Egypt	49	(6)
- * Club domestic league appearances and goals as of 17:40, 16 March 2026 (UTC) ‡ National team caps and goals as of 7 July 2026

Ramy Hisham Abdel Aziz Mostafa Rabia (Note: Arabic: رامي هشام عبد العزيز مصطفى ربيعة) (born 20 May 1993) is an Egyptian professional footballer who plays as a centre-back for UAE Pro League club Al Ain and the Egypt national team.

He began his career with Al Ahly, making his professional debut at the age of seventeen in 2010. Regarded as one of the brightest prospects in Egyptian football, he attracted attention from several clubs before joining Portuguese side Sporting CP in 2014 for a fee of €750,000. However, after one season in which he made only three first team appearances, he rejoined Al Ahly.

== Early life ==
Rabia was born in Cairo, Egypt on 20 May 1993. He started his football career at Al Ahly's academy.

== Club career ==
=== Al Ahly ===
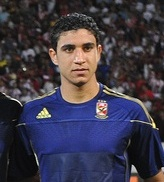
Ramy Rabia with Al Ahly in 2011

Rabia began his career with Al Ahly, making his debut against Haras El Hodoud under coach Abdul-Aziz Abdul-Shafi at the age of seventeen due to injuries to several first team players. Despite Abduk-Shafi's departure soon after, Rabia continued in the first team under new manager Manuel José de Jesus. After club captain Hossam Ghaly was ruled out with injury, Rabia was chosen as his replacement as a defensive midfielder during the 2013 FIFA Club World Cup in Morocco. He earned praise for his performances during the tournament and the club's subsequent league matches as he helped the club win the Egyptian Premier League title after overcoming a seven-point deficit to rivals Zamalek. He attracted attention from several European sides, including Manchester United, Chelsea and Borussia Dortmund. He was offered a trial with French side Lille but was forced to cancel after undergoing surgery for a knee injury suffered during a league match against Smouha.

In December 2013, English Premier League club Hull City submitted an offer for Rabia to join the club on a trial period with the possibility of a loan move for the remainder of the 2013–14 season. The club had previously approached Al Ahly prior to the Club World Cup but negotiations had been delayed to allow Rabia to take part in the competition. However, Al Ahly rejected the offer with club director Sayed Adbel-Hafiz stating "We totally refuse the idea of a player going out on loan from Al Ahly to a club that does not know if they will sign him or not." Despite the move being called off, Hull manager Steve Bruce described Rabia as having "a big future ahead of him."

During his first spell with Al Ahly, Rabia helped the side win two Egyptian Premier League titles, two CAF Champions League titles and two CAF Super Cups. Ramy Rabia is an Egyptian defender who currently plays for Al-Ahly in the Egyptian Premier League.

=== Sporting CP ===
In May 2014, Portuguese side Sporting CP submitted several offers for Rabia, starting at €250,000 and rising to €550,000, which were both rejected by Al Ahly who valued the player at €1.5 million. Al Ahly director Wael Gomaa urged Rabia to focus on his commitments to the club and ignore any transfer approaches. However, a transfer was eventually completed in a deal worth around €750,000 with Al Ahly set to earn 15% of any future transfer. Rabia joined the club on a six-year contract with a €45 million release clause. Following his departure, he released a statement to the club's fans, commenting "Al Ahly is the love of my life."

On his arrival at Sporting, Rabia joined the club's reserve side, Sporting CP B. He made his debut for the side in a 3–0 victory over Aves in the Segunda Liga and provided an assist for Lewis Enoh. However, Rabia was forced to undergo surgery on his stomach after his debut to fix a longstanding problem. He had been playing with the injury for a month but stated that he could not "take the pain anymore." After missing five weeks due to the surgery, Rabia returned to the club's reserve side but received criticism from Sporting manager Marco Silva after being deemed at fault for two goals during a 5–0 defeat against Atlético CP. Silva described Rabia as being "in a very delayed stage of his evolution as a player."

In January 2015, Rabia made his debut for Sporting's first team in a 1–0 victory over Boavista in the Taça de Portugal, a knockout cup competition, as a late substitute in place of Ryan Gauld. He made his first start for the club in the first leg of the following round, a 3–2 defeat to Belenenses. In total, he made three first team appearances for Sporting during the season, all in the Taça de Portugal.

=== Return to Al Ahly ===
After being sent to train with Sporting's reserve side during preseason prior to the 2015–16 season, Rabia announced his intention to leave Sporting either permanently or on loan. In August 2015, he rejoined his former club Al Ahly on a five-year contract. Al Ahly paid €750,000 to resign Rabia, the same amount he was sold for the previous season, with Sporting also set to receive 15% of any future transfer fee.

During the 2016–17 season, Rabia struggled to maintain his place in the side after suffering several injury setbacks. He was forced to undergo knee surgery in August 2016, initially expected to keep him out for one month, and needed a second operation on the injury the following month. After recovering from surgery, Rabia made two appearances for Al Ahly before experiencing a further setback after colliding with goalkeeper Ahmed Adel Abdel Moneam in training and suffering ankle ligament damage. His injury troubles continued the following season, suffering a groin injury during an international match in November 2017, missing ten matches. In January 2018, he again suffered a groin injury during a league match against rivals Zamalek and was ruled out for two months. After missing the remainder of the season, Rabia was forced to publicly deny reports that he could be forced to retire due to ongoing injury problems, commenting "I can't say when I will return, it takes time."

Rabia left the club at the end of the 2024–25 season, having accumulated a total of 337 appearances.

=== Al Ain ===
In June 2025, Rabia joined UAE Pro League side Al Ain as a free agent.

== International career ==
=== Youth teams ===
Rabia represented Egypt at under-20 level, captaining the side to victory in the 2013 African U-20 Championship. He scored the goal that confirmed the squad's qualification for the 2013 FIFA U-20 World Cup with a header during a 1–0 victory over Algeria and sent the side through to the semi-finals. He led the side to their fourth tournament title and first since 2003 after defeating Ghana in the final. Rabia later represented Egypt at under-23 level, playing in the side's unsuccessful qualifying campaign for the 2016 Summer Olympics.

Despite still being in recovery after undergoing knee surgery, Rabia was named in manager Rabie Yassin's preliminary squad for the Under-20 World Cup. The injury forced Rabia to miss the side's warm up matches prior to the tournament but he returned prior to Egypt's first group match and was appointed captain of the squad, commenting "I only came back a few days before our first game, so I didn't expect this honor and I know I owe the coach a lot." He featured in all three of Egypt's group matches as they were eliminated after finishing third.

=== Senior team ===
Rabia made his debut for the Egypt senior team under coach Bob Bradley on 28 December 2012 during a 2–0 victory over Qatar. On 7 March 2013, Rabia scored his first senior international goal in a friendly match against Qatar, scoring his side's only goal in a 3–1 defeat. He scored another goal in his following appearance, a 2–0 victory over Zambia before scoring his first competitive goal in 2015 during a 3–0 victory over Tanzania during the qualifying rounds of the 2017 Africa Cup of Nations.

In October 2017, Rabia was part of the Egyptian side that qualified for the 2018 FIFA World Cup, the first time the nation had reached a tournament since 1990, after defeating Congo 2–1. However, his injury problems during the 2017–18 led to him being omitted from Egypt's squad for the tournament.

On 2 December 2025, Rabia was called up to the Egypt squad for the 2025 Africa Cup of Nations.

On 20 May 2026, he was named in the 26-man squad for the 2026 FIFA World Cup.

== Career statistics ==
=== Club ===
As of match played 8 May 2025

Appearances and goals by club, season and competition
Club	Season	League			National cup (Note: Includes Egypt Cup, Taça de Portugal, Taça da Liga)		Continental		Other		Total	
Club	Season	Division	Apps	Goals	Apps	Goals	Apps	Goals	Apps	Goals	Apps	Goals
Al Ahly	2010–11	Egyptian Premier League	6	0	2	0	5 (Note: Appearance(s) in CAF Champions League)	0	—		13	0
Al Ahly	2011–12	Egyptian Premier League	2	0	—		3	0	—		5	0
Al Ahly	2012–13	Egyptian Premier League	8	1	—		9	0	4 (Note: One appearance in Egyptian Super Cup, one appearance in CAF Super Cup & two in FIFA Club World Cup)	1	21	2
Al Ahly	2013–14	Egyptian Premier League	10	1	—		4	0	3 (Note: One appearance in CAF Super Cup & two in FIFA Club World Cup)	0	17	1
Al Ahly	Total		26	2	2	0	21	0	7	1	56	3
Sporting CP	2014–15	Primeira Liga	0	0	3	0	—		—		3	0
Sporting CP B	2014–15	Liga Portugal 2	21	0	—		—		—		21	0
Al Ahly	2015–16	Egyptian Premier League	25	4	4	0	9	2	1 (Note: Appearance(s) in Egyptian Super Cup)	0	39	6
Al Ahly	2016–17	Egyptian Premier League	11	1	4	0	10	1	—		25	2
Al Ahly	2017–18	Egyptian Premier League	6	0	0	0	—		—		6	0
Al Ahly	2018–19	Egyptian Premier League	6	0	1	0	1	0	—		7	0
Al Ahly	2019–20	Egyptian Premier League	22	0	1	0	9	0	1	0	33	0
Al Ahly	2020–21	Egyptian Premier League	16	0	2	0	5	0	1 (Note: Appearance in CAF Super Cup)	0	24	0
Al Ahly	2021–22	Egyptian Premier League	20	3	5	1	3	0	2 (Note: Appearance(s) in FIFA Club World Cup)	0	30	4
Al Ahly	2022–23	Egyptian Premier League	16	0	4	0	5	0	1	0	26	0
Al Ahly	2023–24	Egyptian Premier League	24	0	1	0	12	0	9 (Note: One appearance in CAF Super Cup, two appearances in Egyptian Super Cup, two in FIFA Club World Cup & four in African Football League)	0	46	0
Al Ahly	2024–25	Egyptian Premier League	20	1	0	0	12	2	5 (Note: One appearance in CAF Super Cup, two appearances in Egyptian Super Cup, one in FIFA Intercontinental Cup)	0	37	3
Al Ahly	Total		166	9	22	1	66	5	20	0	274	15
Career total			213	11	27	1	87	5	27	1	354	18

=== International ===
As of match played 7 July 2026

Appearances and goals by national team and year
National team	Year	Apps	Goals
Egypt	2012	1	0
Egypt	2013	5	2
Egypt	2014	2	0
Egypt	2015	5	1
Egypt	2016	5	0
Egypt	2017	4	0
Egypt	2018	0	0
Egypt	2019	1	0
Egypt	2020	0	0
Egypt	2021	0	0
Egypt	2022	1	0
Egypt	2023	0	0
Egypt	2024	8	2
Egypt	2025	9	0
Egypt	2026	8	1
Total		49	6

Scores and results list Egypt's goal tally first, score column indicates score after each Rabia goal.

List of international goals scored by Ramy Rabia
No.	Date	Venue	Opponent	Score	Result	Competition
1	7 March 2013	Thani bin Jassim Stadium, Doha, Qatar	Qatar	1–0	1–3	Friendly
2	14 November 2013	30 June Stadium, Cairo, Egypt	Zambia	2–0	2–0	Friendly
3	14 June 2015	Borg El Arab Stadium, Alexandria, Egypt	Tanzania	1–0	3–0	2017 Africa Cup of Nations qualification
4	26 March 2024	New Administrative Capital Stadium, New Administrative Capital, Egypt	Croatia	1–0	2–4	2024 FIFA Series
5	6 September 2024	Cairo International Stadium, Cairo, Egypt	Cape Verde	1–0	3–0	2025 Africa Cup of Nations qualification
6	10 January 2026	Adrar Stadium, Agadir, Morocco	Ivory Coast	2–0	3–2	2025 Africa Cup of Nations

== Honours ==
Al Ahly

- Egyptian Premier League: 2010–11, 2013–14, 2015–16, 2016–17, 2017–18, 2018–19, 2019–20, 2022–23, 2023–24, 2024–25
- Egypt Cup: 2016–17, 2019–20, 2021–22, 2022–23
- Egyptian Super Cup: 2015, 2023–24, 2024
- CAF Champions League: 2012, 2013, 2019–20, 2020–21, 2022–23, 2023–24
- CAF Confederation Cup: 2014
- CAF Super Cup: 2013, 2014, 2021, 2022
- FIFA African–Asian–Pacific Cup: 2024

Sporting CP

- Taca de Portugal: 2014–15

Egypt U20

- African U-20 Championship: 2013
