= Hamdy Fathy =

Egyptian footballer (born 1994)

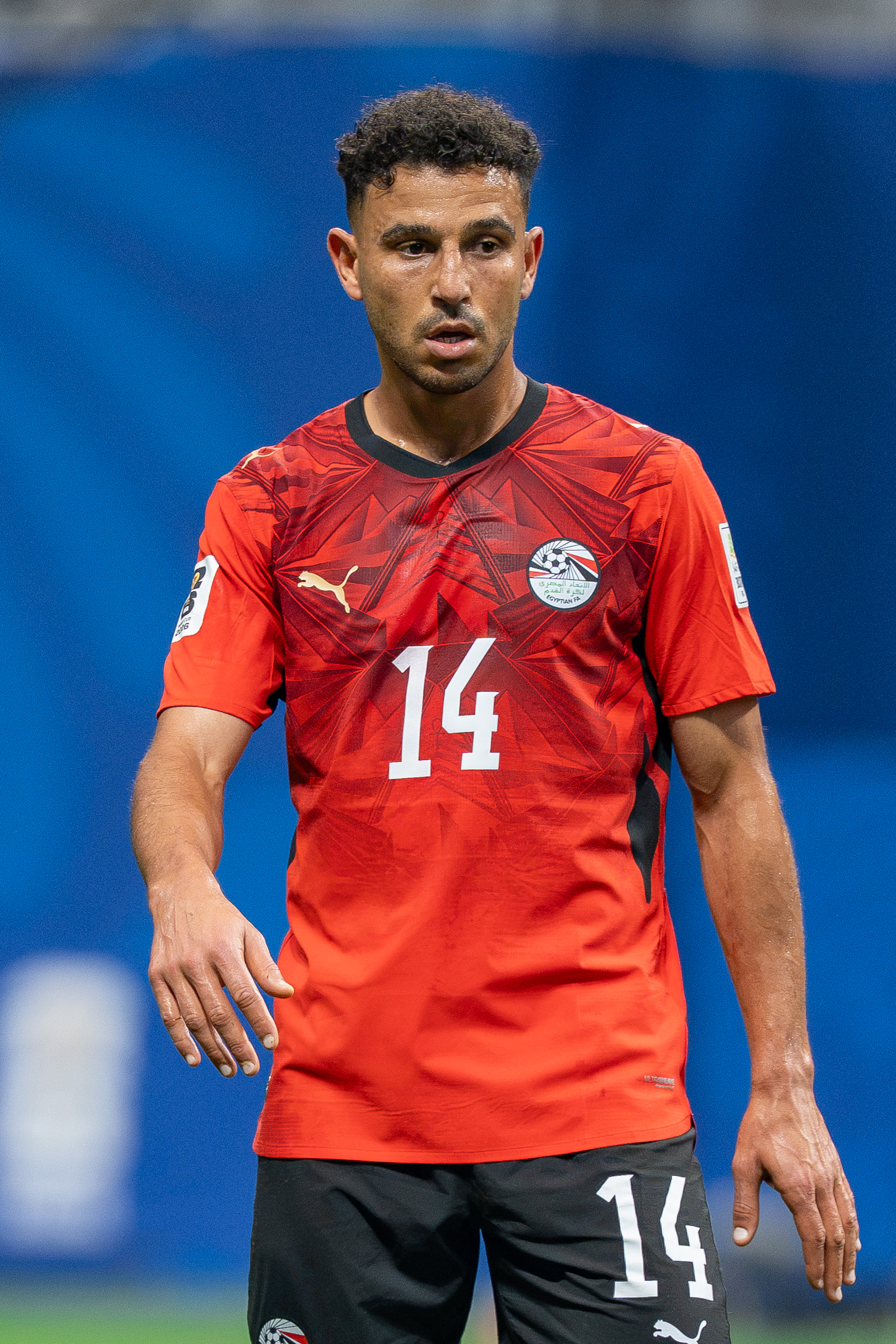
- Fathy with Egypt in 2026

Personal information
- Full name: Hamdy Fathy Abdelhalim Abdelfattah
- Date of birth: 29 September 1994 (age 32)
- Place of birth: Beheira, Egypt
- Height: 1.83 m (6 ft 0 in)
- Position: Defensive midfielder

Team information
- Current team: Al-Wakrah
- Number: 8

Youth career
- 2005–2014: Ala'ab Damanhour

Senior career*
Years	Team	Apps	(Gls)
2014–2015	Ala'ab Damanhour	31	(3)
2015–2018	Enppi	51	(6)
2016–2017	→ Petrojet (loan)	27	(2)
2019–2023	Al Ahly	89	(7)
2023–	Al-Wakrah	49	(5)
2025	→ Al Ahly (loan)	0	(0)

International career^{‡}
2019–	Egypt	67	(4)
Medal record
Representing Egypt
Men's football
Africa Cup of Nations
Runner-up	2021 Cameroon
- * Club domestic league appearances and goals as of 17 January 2026 ‡ National team caps and goals as of 7 July 2026

Hamdy Fathy Abdelhalim Abdelfattah (Note: Arabic: حمدي فتحي عبد الحليم عبد الفتاح) (born 29 September 1994) is an Egyptian professional footballer who plays as a defensive midfielder for Qatar Stars League club Al-Wakrah and the Egypt national team.

== Club career ==
Fathy began his career with Ala'ab Damanhour before moving to Enppi in 2015 and later joining Petrojet on loan. In 2019, he signed with Al Ahly and remained with the club until 2023, when he transferred to Qatari side Al-Wakrah.

=== 2025: Loan to Al Ahly ===
In December 2024, it was announced that he would return to Al Ahly on loan to participate in the 2025 FIFA Club World Cup.

== International career ==
On 14 October 2019, Fathy made his international debut and scored the only goal of the match in a 1–0 win against Botswana. Hamdy featured in the 2021 AFCON final match against Senegal.

On 2 December 2025, Fathy was called up to the Egypt squad for the 2025 Africa Cup of Nations.

On 20 May 2026, Fathy was named in Hossam Hassan's final 26-man squad for the 2026 FIFA World Cup.

== Career statistics ==
=== Club ===
Last updated on 26 January 2024

Appearances and goals by club, season and competition
Club	Season	League			National cup (Note: Includes Egypt Cup, Qatar Cup)		Continental		Other		Total	
Club	Season	Division	Apps	Goals	Apps	Goals	Apps	Goals	Apps	Goals	Apps	Goals
Ala'ab Damanhour	2014–15	Egyptian Premier League	30	3	0	0	—		—		30	3
ENPPI	2015–16	Egyptian Premier League	6	0	1	0	1	0	—		8	0
ENPPI	2016–17	Egyptian Premier League	0	0	0	0	—		—		0	0
ENPPI	2017–18	Egyptian Premier League	29	2	0	0	—		—		29	2
ENPPI	2018–19	Egyptian Premier League	16	3	1	0	—		—		17	3
ENPPI	Total		51	5	2	0	1	0	0	0	54	5
Petrojet (loan)	2016–17	Egyptian Premier League	27	2	2	0	—		—		29	2
Al Ahly	2018–19	Egyptian Premier League	13	2	1	0	1	0	1	0	16	2
Al Ahly	2019–20	Egyptian Premier League	18	3	5	1	5	2	0	0	28	6
Al Ahly	2020–21	Egyptian Premier League	21	0	3	0	12	0	4	0	40	0
Al Ahly	2021–22	Egyptian Premier League	20	1	2	2	16	1	2	0	40	4
Al Ahly	2022–23	Egyptian Premier League	17	1	1	0	12	3	6	0	36	4
Al Ahly	Total		89	7	9	1	39	4	13	0	150	12
Al-Wakrah	2023–24	Qatar Stars League	10	3	0	0	—		—		10	3
Al-Wakrah	Total		10	3	0	0	0	0	0	0	10	3
Career total			208	21	13	1	39	4	13	0	273	26

=== International ===
As of match played 15 November 2024

Appearances and goals by national team and year
National team	Year	Apps	Goals
Egypt	2019	2	2
Egypt	2020	1	0
Egypt	2021	13	0
Egypt	2022	11	0
Egypt	2023	9	2
Egypt	2024	13	0
Total		49	2

Scores and results list Egypt's goal tally first, score column indicates score after each Fathy goal.

List of international goals scored by Hamdy Fathy
No.	Date	Venue	Opponent	Score	Result	Competition
1	14 October 2019	Borg El Arab Stadium, Alexandria, Egypt	Botswana	1–0	1–0	Friendly
2	7 November 2019	Borg El Arab Stadium, Alexandria, Egypt	Liberia	1–0	1–0	Friendly
3	12 October 2023	Hazza bin Zayed Stadium, Abu Dhabi, United Arab Emirates	Zambia	1–0	1–0	Friendly
4	16 October 2023	Hazza bin Zayed Stadium, Abu Dhabi, United Arab Emirates	Algeria	1–0	1–1	Friendly

== Honours ==
Al Ahly

- Egyptian Premier League: 2018–19, 2019–20, 2022–23
- Egypt Cup: 2019–20, 2021–22
- Egyptian Super Cup: 2018–19, 2021–22, 2022–23
- CAF Champions League: 2019–20, 2020–21, 2022–23
- CAF Super Cup: 2021 (May), 2021 (December)

Al-Wakrah

- Qatar Cup: 2024
