= Ahmed Abdel Kader =

Egyptian footballer (born 1999)

Ahmed Abdel Kader أحمد عبد القادر
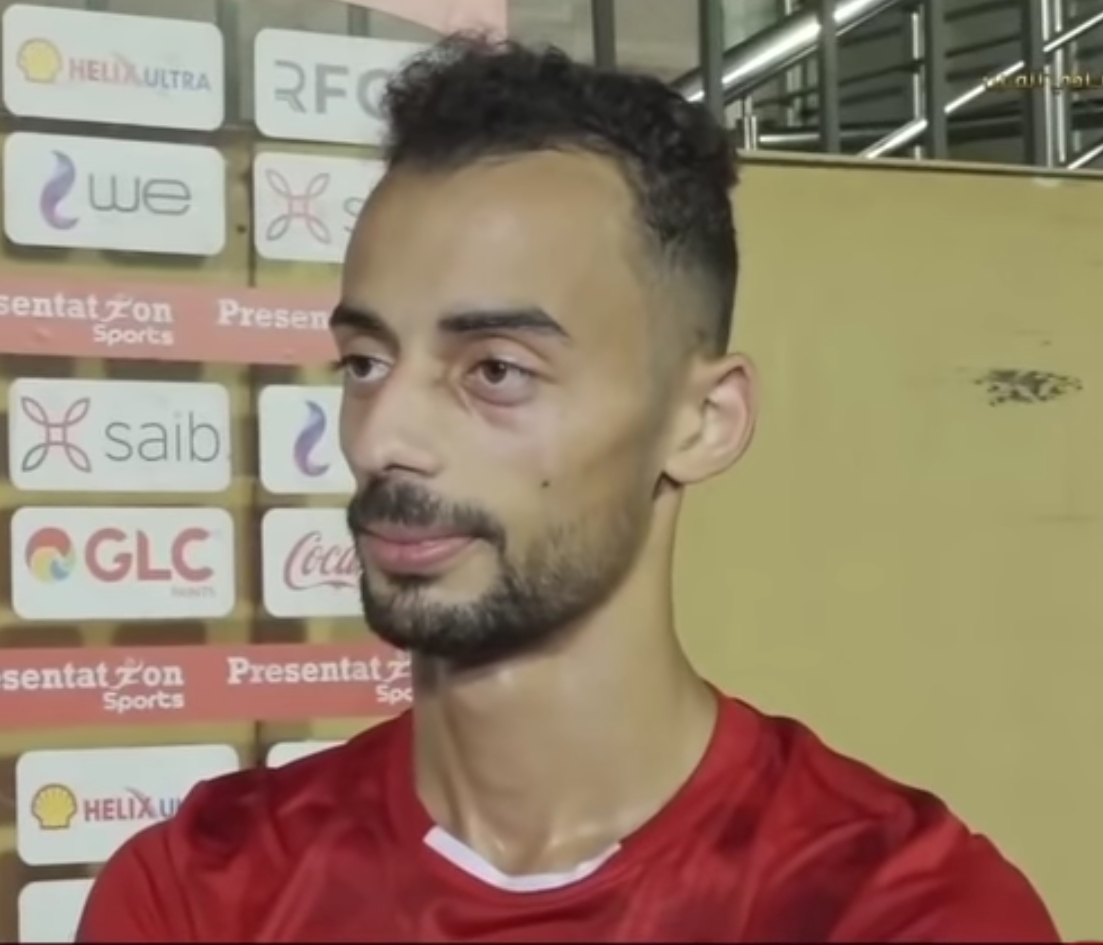
- Ahmed Abdel Kader in 2022

Personal information
- Full name: Ahmed Mohamed Abdel Kader Radwan
- Date of birth: 23 May 1999 (age 27)
- Place of birth: Sinbellawein, Egypt
- Height: 1.80 m (5 ft 11 in)
- Positions: Attacking midfielder; winger

Team information
- Current team: Pyramids
- Number: 9

Youth career
- –2018: Al Ahly
- 2018–2020: Sparta Prague

Senior career*
Years	Team	Apps	(Gls)
2019–2020	Sparta Prague B	4	(0)
2020–2026	Al Ahly	73	(11)
2020–2021	→ Smouha (loan)	27	(9)
2024–2025	→ Qatar (loan)	15	(5)
2026-	Pyramids	0	(0)

International career
2023	Egypt	1	(0)
- * Club domestic league appearances and goals as of 02:58, 16 August 2026 (UTC)

Ahmed Mohamed Abdel Kader Radwan (Arabic: أَحْمَد مُحَمَّد عَبْد الْقَادِر رِضْوَان; born 23 May 1999), commonly known as Ahmed Abdel Kader, is an Egyptian professional footballer who plays as an attacking midfielder for Pyramids.

== Career statistics ==
=== Club ===
As of match played 1 April 2024

Appearances and goals by club, season and competition
Club	Season	League			National cup (Note: Includes Egypt Cup)		Continental		Other		Total	
Club	Season	Division	Apps	Goals	Apps	Goals	Apps	Goals	Apps	Goals	Apps	Goals
Sparta Prague B	2017-18	Juniorska liga	7	0	—		—		—		7	0
Sparta Prague B	2018-19	Juniorska liga	2	1	—		—		—		2	1
Sparta Prague B	2019-20	Bohemian Football League	4	0	—		—		—		4	0
Sparta Prague B	Total		13	1	0	0	0	0	0	0	13	1
Al Ahly	2020-21	Egyptian Premier League	0	0	2	0	—		—		2	0
Al Ahly	2021-22	Egyptian Premier League	25	3	2	2	11 (Note: Appearance(s) in CAF Champions League)	2	5 (Note: One appearance in Egyptian Super Cup, one appearance in CAF Super Cup & three appearances and one goal in FIFA Club World Cup)	1	43	8
Al Ahly	2022-23	Egyptian Premier League	24	6	3	0	12	1	5 (Note: One appearance in Egyptian Super Cup & four appearances and two goals in FIFA Club World Cup)	2	44	9
Al Ahly	2023-24	Egyptian Premier League	4	0	—		2	1	1 (Note: Appearance in African Football League)	0	7	1
Al Ahly	Total		52	9	7	2	25	4	11	3	96	18
Smouha SC (loan)	2020-21	Egyptian Premier League	27	9	—		—		—		27	9
Career Total			92	19	7	2	25	4	11	3	136	28

== Honours ==
Al Ahly

- Egyptian Premier League: 2022–23
- CAF Super Cup: 2021 (December)
- FIFA Club World Cup:Third-Place 2021
- Egyptian Super Cup: 2021–22, 2022–23
- Egypt Cup: 2021–22, 2022–23
- CAF Champions League: 2022-23, 2023-24

=== International ===
As of match played 24 March 2023

National team	Year	Apps	Goals
Egypt	2023	1	0
Total		1	0
