= Mohamed Hany =

Egyptian footballer (born 1996)

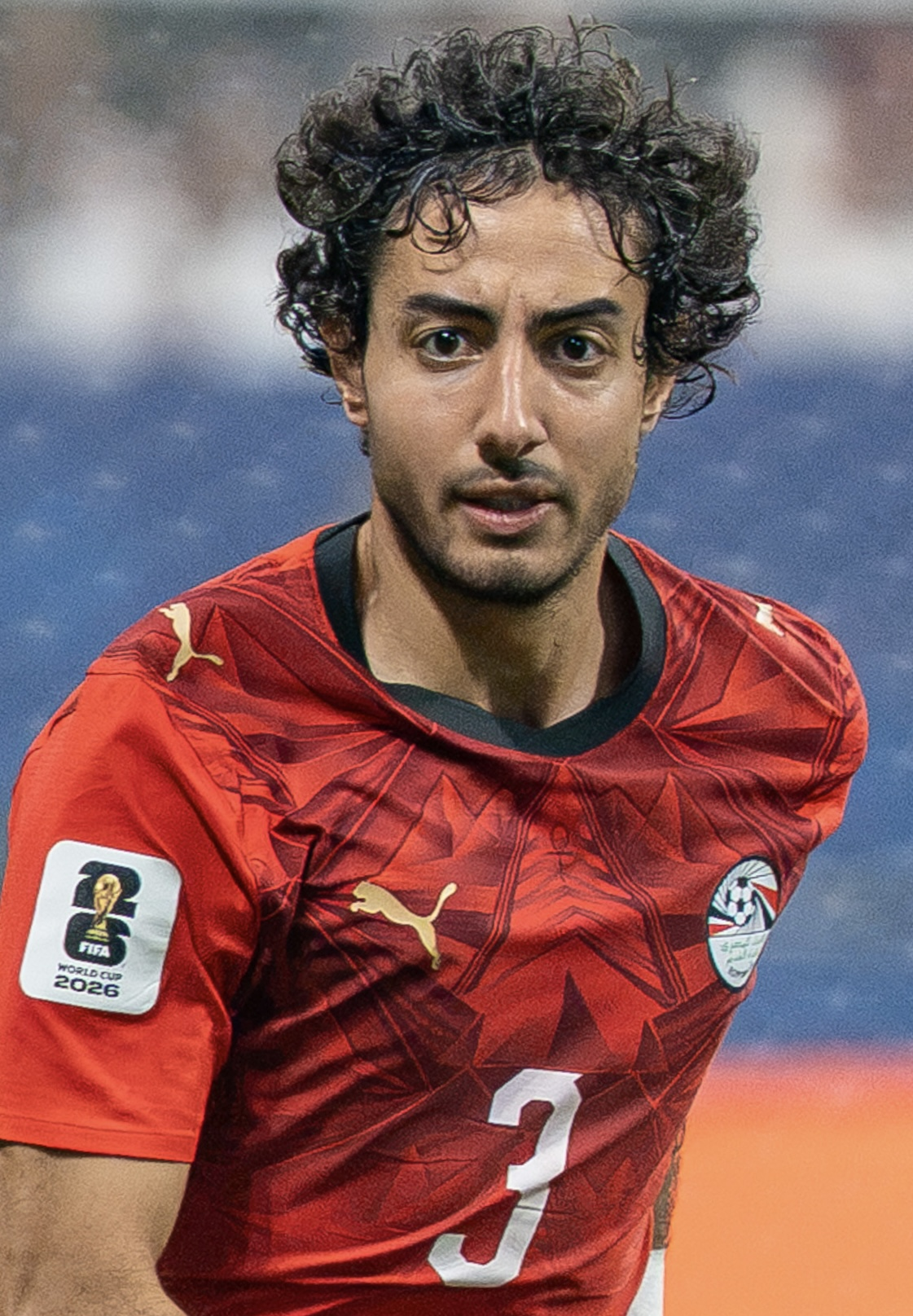
- Hany with Egypt in 2026

Personal information
- Full name: Mohamed Hany Gamal El-Demerdash
- Date of birth: 2 February 1996 (age 30)
- Place of birth: Cairo, Egypt
- Height: 1.75 m (5 ft 9 in)
- Position: Right-back

Team information
- Current team: Al Ahly
- Number: 30

Youth career
- 2005–2014: Al Ahly

Senior career*
Years	Team	Apps	(Gls)
2014–	Al Ahly	224	(5)

International career^{‡}
2015	Egypt U23	2	(0)
2016–	Egypt	52	(1)
- * Club domestic league appearances and goals as of 22 December 2025 ‡ National team caps and goals as of 13 November 2026

Mohamed Hany Gamal El-Demerdash (Note: Arabic: محمد هاني جمال الدمرداش) (born 2 February 1996) is an Egyptian professional footballer who plays as a right-back for Egyptian Premier League club Al Ahly and the Egypt national team.

== Club career ==
Mohamed Hany established himself at Egyptian club Al Ahly, where his performances helped the team win several domestic and continental trophies. He became an important player for the club, particularly at right-back. With Al Ahly, Hany has won four CAF Champions League titles and eight Egyptian Premier League titles, contributing both defensively and offensively.

== International career ==
On 2 December 2025, Hany was called up to the Egypt squad for the 2025 Africa Cup of Nations. He was named in the 26-man squad for the 2026 FIFA World Cup. On June 15, 2026, Hany scored an own goal in their opening match against Belgium in the 2026 FIFA World Cup, leveling the match at 1–1. He then scored another own goal in Egypt against Australia match in Round of 32, becoming the first player in World Cup history to score two own goals.

== Career statistics ==
=== Club ===
As of match played 29 March 2024

Appearances and goals by club, season and competition
Club	Season	League			National cup (Note: Includes Egypt Cup, Egyptian League Cup)		Continental		Other		Total	
Club	Season	Division	Apps	Goals	Apps	Goals	Apps	Goals	Apps	Goals	Apps	Goals
Al Ahly	2014-15	Egyptian Premier League	13	0	3	0	2 (Note: Appearance(s) in CAF Champions League)	0	—		18	0
Al Ahly	2015-16	Egyptian Premier League	15	0	2	0	5	0	—		22	0
Al Ahly	2016-17	Egyptian Premier League	17	0	1	0	6	0	1 (Note: Appearance(s) in Egyptian Super Cup)	0	25	0
Al Ahly	2017-18	Egyptian Premier League	19	1	2	0	7	0	—		28	1
Al Ahly	2018-19	Egyptian Premier League	20	1	1	0	9	0	1	0	31	1
Al Ahly	2019-20	Egyptian Premier League	29	1	3	0	8	0	1	0	41	1
Al Ahly	2020-21	Egyptian Premier League	22	0	3	0	7	0	5 (Note: One appearance in Egyptian Super Cup, one appearance in CAF Super Cup & three appearances in FIFA Club World Cup)	0	37	0
Al Ahly	2021-22	Egyptian Premier League	22	0	6	0	10	0	3 (Note: Appearance(s) in FIFA Club World Cup)	1	41	1
Al Ahly	2022-23	Egyptian Premier League	21	0	5	0	13	0	5 (Note: One appearance in Egyptian Super Cup & four appearances in FIFA Club World Cup)	0	44	0
Al Ahly	2023-24	Egyptian Premier League	11	1	—		8	0	9 (Note: One appearance in CAF Super Cup, two appearance in Egyptian Super Cup, three appearances in FIFA Club World Cup & three appearances in African Football League)	0	28	1
Career Total			189	4	26	0	75	0	25	1	315	5

=== International ===
Statistics accurate as of match played 13 November 2026.

Egypt
Year	Apps	Goals
2016	2	0
2017	0	0
2018	0	0
2019	4	0
2020	1	0
2021	1	0
2022	0	0
2023	7	0
2024	9	0
2025	11	0
2026	17	1
Total	52	1

As of match played 13 November 2026

Egypt score listed first, score column indicates score after each Hany goal

List of international goals scored by Mohamed Hany
No.	Date	Venue	Opponent	Score	Result	Competition
1	13 November 2026	Cairo International Stadium, Cairo, Egypt	Malawi	3–0	5–0	2027 Africa Cup of Nations qualification

== Honours ==
=== Al Ahly ===
- Egyptian Premier League: 2015–16, 2016–17, 2017–18, 2018–19, 2019–20, 2022–23, 2023–24, 2024–25
- Egypt Cup: 2016–17, 2019–20, 2021–22, 2022–23
- Egyptian Super Cup: 2017–18, 2018–19, 2021–22, 2022–23, 2023–24, 2024–25, 2025–26
- CAF Champions League: 2019–20, 2020–21, 2022–23, 2023–24
- CAF Super Cup: 2021 (May), 2021 (December)
- FIFA African–Asian–Pacific Cup: 2024
