= 2021–22 Egypt Cup =

Tournament details
- Country: Egypt
- Dates: 9 November 2021 – 23 December 2021 (qualifying competition); 10 March 2022 – 10 April 2023 (main competition)
- Teams: 174 (overall); 156 (qualifying competition); 32 (main competition)

Final positions
- Champions: Al Ahly (38th title)
- Runners-up: Pyramids
- Confederation Cup: Future (Note: The 2021–22 Egypt Cup was not finished by the CAF deadline. As a result, the Egyptian Football Association announced that Pyramids who were in the third place and Future who were in the fourth place after the end of the first half of the league, (after the end of the first half of the 2021–22 Egyptian Premier League), would take the cup winners slot and would represent Egypt in the 2022–23 CAF Confederation Cup.)
- All statistics correct as of 15 July 2022.

The 2021–22 Egypt Cup was the 90th edition of the oldest recognised football tournament in Africa. It started with the First Preliminary Round on 9 November 2021, and concluded with the final on 10 April 2023.

Egyptian Premier League side Zamalek are the defending champions, having defeated Al Ahly in the final.

== Teams ==
Round	Clubs remaining	Clubs involved	Winners from previous round	New entries this round	Leagues entering at this round
Main competition
Round of 32	32	32	14	18	Egyptian Premier League
Round of 16	16	16	16	none	none
Quarter-finals	8	8	8	none	none
Semi-finals	4	4	4	none	none
Final	2	2	2	none	none

== Round of 32 ==
All matches were played between 10 and 28 March 2022, except matches involving teams participating in African competitions (Al Ahly, Al Masry and Zamalek) were postponed and played on 12 June and 13 June 2022. All times are CAT (UTC+2).

10 March 2022	Al Mokawloon Al Arab (1)	1–0	Telecom Egypt (3)	Cairo
18:00	Ali 70'	Report	Ahmed Bondok (red card) 30'	Stadium: Osman Ahmed Osman Stadium; Referee: Hossam Azzab

11 March 2022	ENPPI (1)	7–1	Dayrout (2)	Cairo
15:00	Gomaa 7'; Mohamed Morsi 26', 43'; Shaaban AbdelHamid 68'; Amr Mostafa 73'; Rico 79'	Report	Saeed Gamal 90+2'	Stadium: Petro Sport Stadium; Referee: Ahmed Nasser

11 March 2022	Pharco (1)	1–2	Kafr El Sheikh (2)	Alexandria
18:00	Mohamed Osama 33'	Report	Ayman Moka 54' (pen.); Refaat Moftah 83'	Stadium: Haras El Hodoud Stadium; Referee: Amr Ayed

12 March 2022	El Gouna (1)	3–1	Banha (2)	Hurghada
15:00	Roshdi 11'; Tarek Samy 29'; Tarek 90+3'	Report	Hassan Zakaria 83'	Stadium: Khaled Bichara Stadium; Referee: Mohamed El Qelawi

12 March 2022	Ismaily (1)	0–0 (a.e.t.) (5–4 p)	Petrojet (2)	Ismailia
18:00		Report		Stadium: Ismailia Stadium; Referee: Mohamed Youssef
	Penalties
	El Wahsh (penalty scored); El Shamy (penalty missed); Mostafa (penalty scored); Madbouly (penalty scored); El Halwani (penalty scored); Abdel Hakim (penalty scored)		(penalty scored) Hossam Mohamed; (penalty scored) Mohamed El Sayed; (penalty scored) Mostafa Moawad; (penalty missed) Mahmoud Mansour; (penalty scored) Sameh Ibrahim; (penalty missed) Mohamed Nour

12 March 2022	Ceramica Cleopatra (1)	2–1	Al Ittihad (1)	Cairo
18:00	Dabo 32'; Mosaab El Batat 46'	Report	El Deeb 38'	Stadium: Osman Ahmed Osman Stadium; Referee: Tarek Magdy

13 March 2022	Ghazl El Mahalla (1)	1–1 (a.e.t.) (2–4 p)	Eastern Company (1)	El Mahalla
15:00	Abdo Yehia 58'	Report	Emad Mayhoub 76'	Stadium: Ghazl El Mahalla Stadium; Referee: Mohamed Salama
	Penalties
	El Henawy (penalty scored); Mohamed Bazoka (penalty scored); Ehab Samir (penalty missed); Yehia Hamed (penalty missed)		(penalty scored) Ahmed Thabet; (penalty scored) Mody Nasser; (penalty scored) Belal Aya; (penalty missed) Kamal Abo El Fetouh; (penalty scored) Youssef Magdy

13 March 2022	Tala'ea El Gaish (1)	3–1	Helwan (3)	Cairo
15:00	Samir 23' (pen.); Antwi 45+3'; Hassan Magdy 68'	Report	Ahmed Eid 28'	Stadium: Gehaz El Reyada Stadium; Referee: Ahmed Hamed

13 March 2022	National Bank of Egypt (1)	1–0	Aswan (2)	Cairo
18:00	Fady Farid 53'	Report		Stadium: Petro Sport Stadium; Referee: Amr El Shenawy

14 March 2022	Misr Lel Makkasa (1)	2–0	Beni Ebeid (2)	Cairo
15:00	Khaled Salah 30'; Mahmoud Fahmy 70'	Report		Stadium: Cairo Military Academy Stadium; Referee: Hosny Soltan

18 March 2022	Smouha (1)	2–0	Ala'ab Damanhour (2)	Alexandria
15:00	Sodiq Awujoola 24'; Sylla 37'; Abubakar Liday 90+3'	Report	Ali Oscar 41'	Stadium: Haras El Hodoud Stadium; Referee: Mohamed El Tabei

26 March 2022	Future (1)	1–1 (a.e.t.) (2–4 p)	Suez SC (2)	Cairo
18:00	Mohamed Reda 43' (pen.)	Report	Bassem Adel 77'	Stadium: Al Salam Stadium; Referee: Mahmoud Desouki
	Penalties
	Farouk (penalty scored); Mohamed Reda (penalty scored); Marwan Sahrawy (penalty missed); Karim Walid (penalty missed)		(penalty scored) Bassem Adel; (penalty scored) Ahmed Hatem; (penalty scored) Ibrahim Awaad; (penalty scored) Ahmed Fathy

28 March 2022	Pyramids (1)	1–0	La Viena	Cairo
18:00	Samy 35'	Report		Stadium: 30 June Stadium; Referee: Mohamed Abbas

12 June 2022	Al Masry (1)	2–1	El Mansoura (2)	Alexandria
18:30	Mohamed Grendo 73'; Ahmed El Sheikh 82'	Report	Ahmed Abdelaal 58' (pen.)	Stadium: Borg El Arab Stadium; Referee: Osama Ismaiel

12 June 2022	Al Ahly (1)	1–0	Al Masry Sallum (2)	Cairo
21:00	Abdel Kader 59'	Report		Stadium: Al Ahly WE Stadium; Referee: Nader Kamar

13 June 2022	Zamalek (1)	2–1 (a.e.t.)	El Dakhleya (2)	Cairo
20:00	Farouk 60'; Bencharki 105+1'	Report	Samir Fekry 4'	Stadium: Cairo Stadium; Referee: Mahmoud Bassiouny

== Round of 16 ==
All times are CAT (UTC+2).

1 July 2022	Al Mokawloon Al Arab (1)	2–0	El Gouna (1)	Cairo
20:00	Hinestroza 62'; Omar Bassam 74'	Report	Rizk (red card) 40'	Stadium: Osman Ahmed Osman Stadium; Referee: Mahmoud Nassef

5 July 2022	Smouha (1)	6–1	Kafr El Sheikh (2)	Alexandria
18:00	El Ouadi 14' 81' (penalty missed); Sodiq Awujoola 21' 59'; Hamdy 26'; Sylla 85'	Report	Gamal 16' (o.g.)	Stadium: Alexandria Stadium; Referee: Ahmed Nasser

6 July 2022	Tala'ea El Gaish (1)	0–1	Suez (2)	Cairo
18:00		Report	Adel Emam 66'	Stadium: Gehaz El Reyada Stadium; Referee: Ali El Saeed

6 July 2022	Pyramids (1)	2–1	Ceramica Cleopatra (1)	Cairo
21:00	Ben Youssef 17'; Issa 67'	Report	Hamza Magdy 69'; El Badry (yellow card) 30' (yellow-red card) 82'	Stadium: Cairo International Stadium; Referee: Walid Abdel Razek

7 July 2022	Al Masry (1)	1–0	Eastern Company (1)	Alexandria
18:00	Mohamed Grendo 79' (pen.)	Report		Stadium: Borg El Arab Stadium; Referee: Galal Ahmed

12 August 2022	ENPPI (1)	4–4 (a.e.t.) (1–3 p)	National Bank of Egypt (1)	Cairo
20:00	Mostafa Shalabi 35', 38'; Ebuka 92', 120'	Report	Mansi 24', 45+2', 105', 116'	Stadium: Petro Sport Stadium; Referee: Mahmoud Nagy
	Penalties
	Hesham Adel (penalty missed); Ahmed El Agouz (penalty scored); Girgis Magdy (penalty missed); Ebuka (penalty missed)		(penalty scored) Helal; (penalty scored) Ibrahim; (penalty missed) Yassin; (penalty scored) Faisal

14 August 2022	Al Ahly (1)	1–0	Misr Lel Makkasa (1)	Cairo
20:00	Rabia 90+4' (pen.)	Report		Stadium: Al Ahly WE Al Salam Stadium; Referee: Wael Farhan

15 August 2022	Zamalek (1)	1–0	Ismaily (1)	Cairo
20:00	Zizo 21' (pen.)	Report		Stadium: Cairo Stadium; Referee: Mohamed Adel

== Quarter-finals ==
All times are CAT (UTC+2).

27 November 2022	Al Ahly (1)	1–1 (a.e.t.) (4–3 p)	Al Mokawloon Al Arab (1)	Cairo
19:00	Fouad 68'	Report	Okoli 76'	Stadium: Al Salam Stadium; Referee: Nader Qamar
	Penalties
	Rabia (penalty scored); Hany (penalty scored); Dieng (penalty scored); Ibrahim (penalty scored)		(penalty missed) F. Kabore; (penalty scored) A. Eldin; (penalty scored) A. Abed; (penalty scored) Ochaya; (penalty missed) O. Fayed

27 November 2022	Pyramids (1)	1–0	National Bank of Egypt (1)	Cairo
16:00	Sobhi 16'	Report		Stadium: Petro Sport Stadium; Referee: Mahmoud Bassiouni

26 November 2022	Zamalek (1)	1–0	Al Masry (1)	Cairo
19:00	Zizo 59'	Report		Stadium: Cairo International Stadium; Referee: Abdelaziz El Sayed

14 August 2022	Suez (2)	0–2	Smouha (1)	Suez
18:00		Report	Mohamed Nadi 75'; Sylla 90+2'	Stadium: Egyptian Army Stadium; Referee: Mahmoud Mansour

== Semi-finals ==
All times are CAT (UTC+2).

16 January 2023	Zamalek (1)	1–1 (a.e.t.) (3–4 p)	Pyramids (1)	Cairo
19:00	H. Abdul-Majeed 6'	Report	W. El Karti 55'; A. Gabr (red card) 11'	Stadium: Cairo International Stadium; Referee: Mahmoud El Banna
	Penalties
	Zizo (penalty missed); Roqa (penalty scored); Shalaby (penalty scored); Ashour (penalty scored); Shikabala (penalty missed)		(penalty scored) Sobhi; (penalty scored) Ben Youssef; (penalty scored) El Gabbas; (penalty scored) Galal

17 January 2023	Al Ahly (1)	3–1	Smouha (1)	Cairo
19:00	A. Abdel Kader 8'; H. Fathy 11'; Kahraba 36'	Report	H. Hassan 90+1' (pen.)	Stadium: Cairo International Stadium; Referee: Tarek Magdi

== Final ==
10 April 2023	Al Ahly	2–1 (a.e.t.)	Pyramids	Cairo
21:15 Egypt Standard Time (UTC+02:00)	Kahraba 74'; H. Fathy 105'		W. El Karti 72'	Stadium: Cairo International Stadium; Attendance: 10,000; Referee: Amin Omar
