= 2019–20 Al Ahly SC season =

Al Ahly
2019–20 season
- President: Mahmoud El Khatib
- Manager: Martín Lasarte (30 December 2018 – 18 August 2019); Mohamed Youssef (caretaker) (18–31 August 2019); René Weiler (31 August 2019 – 1 October 2020); Pitso Mosimane (2 October 2020 –Present)
- Stadium: Cairo International Stadium; Al Ahly WE Stadium (Note: Despite the official name of Al Salam Stadium was supposed to be changed to Al Ahly Stadium on 1 January 2020, the stadium was still referred to with its old name.)
- Egyptian Premier League: Winners
- Egypt Cup: Winners
- Egyptian Super Cup: Runners-up
- CAF Champions League: Winners
- Top goalscorer: League: Walid Soliman (9 goals); All: Walid Soliman (14 goals)
Home colours	Away colours	Third colours
- All statistics correct as of 24 February 2020.

The 2019–20 Al Ahly season was the 112th season in the football club's history and 61st consecutive and overall season in the top flight of Egyptian football, the Egyptian Premier League. In addition to the domestic league, Al Ahly also participated in this season's editions of the domestic cup, the Egypt Cup, the Egyptian Super Cup, and the first-tier African cup, the CAF Champions League. The season covers a period from 1 July 2019 to 5 December 2020.

== Kit information ==
Supplier: Umbro
Sponsors: WE, SAIB Bank, GLC Paints, Tiger Chips, Royal Dutch Shell

Home	Away	Third

== Players ==
=== Current squad ===
As of 1 February 2020

Note: Flags indicate national team as defined under FIFA eligibility rules; some limited exceptions apply. Players may hold more than one non-FIFA nationality.

No.	Pos.	Nation	Player
1	GK	EGY	Mohamed El Shenawy (Captain)
3	MF	EGY	Akram Tawfik
4	MF	EGY	Nasser Maher
5	DF	EGY	Ramy Rabia
6	DF	EGY	Yasser Ibrahim
7	FW	EGY	Ramadan Sobhi
8	MF	EGY	Hamdy Fathy
9	FW	EGY	Marwan Mohsen
10	MF	EGY	Saleh Gomaa
11	MF	EGY	Walid Soliman
12	DF	EGY	Ayman Ashraf
13	DF	MAR	Badr Banoun
14	MF	EGY	Hussein El Shahat
15	MF	MLI	Aliou Dieng
16	GK	EGY	Ali Lotfi

No.	Pos.	Nation	Player
17	MF	EGY	Amr El Solia
18	FW	SEN	Aliou Badji
19	MF	EGY	Mohamed Magdy
20	DF	EGY	Saad Samir
21	DF	TUN	Ali Maâloul
22	MF	EGY	Ahmed El Sheikh
23	DF	EGY	Mahmoud Wahid
24	FW	EGY	Salah Mohsen
25	FW	EGY	Mohamed Sherif
26	FW	EGY	Mahmoud Kahraba
28	FW	NGR	Junior Ajayi
29	FW	ANG	Geraldo
30	DF	EGY	Mohamed Hany
76	GK	EGY	Mostafa Shobeir

=== Youth Academy ===
Note: Flags indicate national team as defined under FIFA eligibility rules; some limited exceptions apply. Players may hold more than one non-FIFA nationality.

No.	Pos.	Nation	Player
32	DF	EGY	Faress Mohamed
—	DF	EGY	Mohamed Maghrabi
34	DF	EGY	Abdel Rahman Ashraf
—	MF	EGY	Shady Radwan
40	MF	EGY	Arabi Badr

No.	Pos.	Nation	Player
—	MF	EGY	Mohamed Fakhri
36	MF	EGY	Ahmed Nabil Koka
38	DF	EGY	Mohamed Shokry
99	GK	EGY	Hamza Alaa

=== Out on loan ===
Note: Flags indicate national team as defined under FIFA eligibility rules; some limited exceptions apply. Players may hold more than one non-FIFA nationality.

No.	Pos.	Nation	Player
—	DF	EGY	Ahmed Alaa (at Tala'ea El Gaish until 30 June 2021)
—	DF	EGY	Basem Ali (at El Gouna until 30 June 2020)
—	DF	EGY	Mahmoud El Gazzar (at El Gouna until 30 June 2020)
—	DF	EGY	Hussein El Sayed (at CS Sfaxien until 30 June 2020)
—	MF	EGY	Amar Hamdy (at Tala'ea El Gaish until 30 June 2020)
—	MF	EGY	Nasser Maher (at Smouha until 30 June 2020)
—	DF	EGY	Karim Yehia (at Smouha until 30 June 2020)
—	DF	EGY	Mohamed Abdelmonem (at Smouha until 30 June 2021)

No.	Pos.	Nation	Player
—	MF	EGY	Akram Tawfik (at El Gouna until 30 June 2020)
—	FW	MAR	Walid Azaro (at Al Ettifaq until 30 June 2020)
—	FW	EGY	Amr Gamal (at Tala'ea El Gaish until 30 June 2021)
—	FW	EGY	Salah Mohsen (at Smouha until 30 June 2020)
—	FW	EGY	Ahmed Yasser Rayyan (at El Gouna until 30 June 2020)
—	FW	EGY	Mohamed Sherif (at ENPPI until 30 June 2020)
—	MF	EGY	Fawzi El Henawy (at Smouha until 30 June 2021)

== Transfers ==
=== Transfers in ===
#	Position	Player	Transferred from	Fee	Date	Source
42	DF	(Egypt) Mahmoud El Gazzar	(Egypt) El Gouna	End of loan	30 June 2019	
2	DF	(Egypt) Hussein El Sayed	(Saudi Arabia) Al Ettifaq	End of loan	30 June 2019	
5	MF	(Egypt) Amr Barakat	(Egypt) Smouha	End of loan	30 June 2019	
17	MF	(Egypt) Ahmed Hamdy	(Egypt) El Gouna	End of loan	30 June 2019	
35	MF	(Egypt) Akram Tawfik	(Egypt) El Gouna	End of loan	30 June 2019	
38	FW	(Egypt) Amar Hamdy	(Egypt) Al Ittihad	End of loan	30 June 2019	
40	FW	(Egypt) Fawzy El Henawy	(Egypt) Al Ittihad	End of loan	30 June 2019	
39	FW	(Egypt) Ahmed Yasser Rayyan	(Egypt) El Gouna	End of loan	30 June 2019	
15	MF	(Mali) Aliou Dieng	(Algeria) MC Alger	E£22m	5 July 2019	
4	DF	(Egypt) Mahmoud Metwalli	(Egypt) Ismaily	E£15m	30 July 2019	
19	MF	(Egypt) Mohamed Magdy	(Egypt) Pyramids	E£20m	31 July 2019	
26	FW	(Egypt) Mahmoud Kahraba	(Portugal) Desportivo das Aves	Undisclosed	13 December 2019	
18	FW	(Senegal) Aliou Badji	(Austria) Rapid Wien	E£38m	16 January 2020	
	FW	(Egypt) Taher Mohamed	(Egypt) Al Mokawloon Al Arab	E£20m	3 August 2020	

==== Loans in ====
#	Position	Player	Loaned from	Date	Loan expires	Source
7	FW	(Egypt) Ramadan Sobhi	(England) Huddersfield Town	5 July 2019	30 June 2020	

=== Transfers out ===
Position	Player	Transferred to	Fee	Date	Source
FW	(Egypt) Mohamed Naguib	(Egypt) El Gouna	Free Transfer	31 July 2019	
MF	(Egypt) Islam Mohareb	(Egypt) El Gouna	E£4m	12 August 2019	
MF	(Egypt) Amr Barakat	(Egypt) El Gouna	Undisclosed	12 August 2019	
MF	(Egypt) Ahmed Hamdy	(Egypt) El Gouna	Undisclosed	18 September 2019	
MF	(Egypt) Hesham Mohamed	(Egypt) Al Ittihad Alexandria	Free Transfer	20 August 2019	
MF	(Egypt) Ahmed Hamoudi	(Egypt) Pyramids FC	released	20 August 2019	
MF	(Egypt) Islam Gaber	(Egypt) El Raja	released	18 September 2019	

==== Loans out ====
Position	Player	Loaned to	Date	Loan expires	Source
FW	(Egypt) Ahmed Yasser Rayyan	(Egypt) El Gouna	3 August 2019	30 June 2020	
DF	(Egypt) Mahmoud El Gazzar	(Egypt) El Gouna	3 August 2019	30 June 2020	
MF	(Egypt) Akram Tawfik	(Egypt) El Gouna	3 August 2019	30 June 2020	
DF	(Egypt) Basem Ali	(Egypt) El Gouna	29 August 2019	30 June 2020	
DF	(Egypt) Ahmed Alaa	(Egypt) Tala'ea El Gaish	9 August 2019	30 June 2021	
FW	(Egypt) Amr Gamal	(Egypt) Tala'ea El Gaish	9 August 2019	30 June 2021	
MF	(Egypt) Nasser Maher	(Egypt) Smouha	19 August 2019	30 June 2020	
MF	(Egypt) Mohamed Sherif	(Egypt) Enppi	25 August 2019	30 June 2020	
FW	(Morocco) Walid Azaro	(Saudi Arabia) Ettifaq	22 January 2020	30 June 2020	
MF	(Egypt) Salah Mohsen	(Egypt) Smouha	26 January 2020	30 June 2020	
MF	(Egypt) Amar Hamdy	(Egypt) Tala'ea El Gaish	28 January 2020	30 June 2020	
DF	(Egypt) Mohamed Abdelmonem	(Egypt) Smouha	23 January 2020	30 June 2021	
DF	(Egypt) Karim Yehia	(Egypt) Smouha	23 January 2019	30 June 2020	
MF	(Egypt) Fawzi El Henawy	(Egypt) Smouha	18 July 2019	30 June 2021	

== Friendly matches ==
Win Draw Loss

3 July 2019	Al Ahly (Egypt)	0–0	(Egypt) El Motaheda HR	Cairo, Egypt
17:30 CAT (UTC+2)		Report		Stadium: Mokhtar El Tetsh Stadium

8 July 2019	Soccer Smart Academy (Spain)	0–9	(Egypt) Al Ahly	Alicante, Spain
16:30 CEST (UTC+2)		Report	El Shahat 11'; Azaro 37', 42'; Jordan 38' (o.g.); Ramadan 40'; S. Mohsen 61'; El Sheikh 67', 86'; Maher 81'	Stadium: La Finca

11 July 2019	Newport County (Wales)	1–1	(Egypt) Al Ahly	Murcia, Spain
18:30 CEST (UTC+2)	Amond 22' (pen.)	Report	El Sheikh 52'	Stadium: Pinatar Arena

15 July 2019	UCAM Murcia (Spain)	0–7	(Egypt) Al Ahly	Murcia, Spain
18:30 CEST (UTC+2)		Report	Ajayi 8', 44'; H. Fathy 14'; Azaro 17', 82'; Ramadan 29', 36'	Stadium: Pinatar Arena

19 July 2019	Al Ahly (Egypt)	4–0	(Egypt) Plastic Shubra El Kheima	Cairo, Egypt
18:00 CAT (UTC+2)	Azaro 51', 60'; Gomaa 72'; M. Mohsen 89' (pen.)	Report		Stadium: Mokhtar El Tetsh Stadium

14 October 2019	Al Ahly (Egypt)	1–0	(Egypt) Media	Cairo, Egypt
16:00 CAT (UTC+2)	Azaro 24'	Report		Stadium: Mokhtar El Tetsh Stadium

24 July 2020	Al Ahly (Egypt)	4–0	(Egypt) Smouha	Cairo, Egypt
17:00 CAT (UTC+2)	Kahraba 44', 80'; Mohsen 56'; Ajayi 81'	Report		Stadium: Mokhtar El Tetsh Stadium

28 July 2020	Al Ahly (Egypt)	5–2	(Egypt) El Gouna	Cairo, Egypt
17:00 CAT (UTC+2)	Soliman 2'; Ibrahim 41'; Afsha 51' (pen.) 83'; Badji 90'	Report	Mohamed Magdy 65' (pen.); Fathy 68' (o.g.)	Stadium: Mokhtar El Tetsh Stadium

== Competitions ==
=== Overview ===
Competition	First match	Last match	Starting round	Final position	Record							
Competition	First match	Last match	Starting round	Final position	Pld	W	D	L	GF	GA	GD	Win %
Egyptian Premier League	23 September 2019	31 October 2020	Matchday 1	Winners	34	28	5	1	74	8	+66	82.35
Egypt Cup	3 December 2019	5 December 2020	Round of 32	Winners	5	5	0	0	10	5	+5	100.00
Egyptian Super Cup	20 February 2020		Final	Runners-up	1	0	0	1	0	0	+0	0.00
CAF Champions League	11 August 2019	27 November 2020	Preliminary round	Winners	15	11	3	1	36	7	+29	73.33
Total					55	44	8	3	120	20	+100	80.00

Last updated: 6 December 2020
Source: Competitions

=== Egyptian Premier League ===
==== League table ====
Pos	Team	Pld	W	D	L	GF	GA	GD	Pts	Qualification or relegation
1	Al Ahly (C)	34	28	5	1	74	8	+66	89	Qualification for the Champions League
2	Zamalek	34	21	8	5	50	27	+23	68 (Note: As a result of Zamalek refusing to play their away fixture against Al Ahly on 24 February 2020, the club was subject to a 3-point deduction following the conclusion of the season.)	Qualification for the Champions League
3	Pyramids	34	19	8	7	54	33	+21	65	Qualification for the Confederation Cup (Note: Since the 2019–20 Egypt Cup wouldn't finish by the CAF deadline, the spot awarded to the Egypt Cup winners (Confederation Cup preliminary or first round) was passed to the fourth-placed team, Al Mokawloon Al Arab.)
4	Al Mokawloon Al Arab	34	15	9	10	45	34	+11	54	Qualification for the Confederation Cup
5	Smouha	34	11	18	5	44	33	+11	51	

Source: Soccerway
Rules for classification: 1) Points; 2) Head-to-Head points; 3) Head-to-Head goal difference; 4) Head-to-Head goals scored; 5) Head-to-Head away goals scored; 6) Goal difference; 7) Goals scored.
(Note: Head-to-head record is used only after all the matches between the teams in question have been played).
(C) Champions

==== Results summary ====
Overall								Home						Away					
Pld	W	D	L	GF	GA	GD	Pts	W	D	L	GF	GA	GD	W	D	L	GF	GA	GD
34	28	5	1	74	8	+66	89	14	3	0	38	2	+36	14	2	1	36	6	+30

Last updated: 7 November 2020.
Source: Soccerway

==== Results by round ====
Round	1	2	3	4	5	6	7	8	9	10	11	12	13	14	15	16	17	18	19	20	21	22	23	24	25	26	27	28	29	30	31	32	33	34
Ground	A	H	A	H	A	H	A	H	A	H	A	H	H	A	H	A	H	H	A	H	A	H	A	H	A	H	A	H	A	A	H	A	H	A
Result	W	W	W	W	W	W	W	W	W	W	W	W	W	W	W	W	W	D	D	W	L	W	W	W	W	W	D	D	W	W	W	W	D	W
Position	5	2	1	1	1	3	2	1	1	1	1	1	1	1	1	1	1	1	1	1	1	1	1	1	1	1	1	1	1	1	1	1	1	1

Updated to match(es) played on 7 November 2020. Source: Soccerway
A = Away; H = Home; W = Win; D = Draw; L = Loss

==== Matches ====
The fixtures for the 2019–20 season were announced on 12 September 2019.

23 September 2019 1	Smouha	0–1	Al Ahly	Alexandria
17:30 CAT (UTC+2)	Al Tarhoni (yellow card) 30'; Gamal (yellow card) 57'	Report	Ramadan 10'; Ashraf (yellow card) 27'	Stadium: Borg El Arab Stadium; Referee: Ahmed El Ghandour

2 October 2019 2	Al Ahly	4–0	El Entag El Harby	Cairo
20:00 CAT (UTC+2)	Ramadan 25'; Hany (yellow card) 51'; El Shahat 56'; Ajayi 69'; Soliman 88'	Report	Magdy (yellow card) 55'; Ma. Adel (yellow card) 68'	Stadium: Al Salam Stadium; Referee: Mohamed El Sabahy

5 October 2019 3	Aswan	1–5	Al Ahly	Aswan
15:00 CAT (UTC+2)	Oukri 67'; Abdel Zaher (yellow card) 75'	Report	Ajayi 7'; El Shahat 25'; H. Fathy 59'; Magdy 66' (pen.); Ramadan 86'	Stadium: Aswan Stadium; Referee: Mohamed El Hanafy

25 November 2019 (Note: All Egyptian Premier League fixtures scheduled to be played between 23 October and 22 November 2019 were postponed due to Egypt U-23 team's involvement in the 2019 Africa U-23 Cup of Nations.) 5	El Gouna	0–4	Al Ahly	El Gouna
17:00 CAT (UTC+2)	Leila (yellow card) 27'; Bwalya (yellow card) 29'; Magdy (yellow card) 61'	Report	Soliman 10', 42', 49'; El Shahat 88'	Stadium: El Gouna Stadium; Referee: Mohamed Maarouf

11 December 2019 7	Wadi Degla	0–3	Al Ahly	Cairo
19:30 CAT (UTC+2)	Ab. Ramadan (yellow card) 42'	Report	Ramadan 53'; Azaro 72'; El Sheikh 90+3'	Stadium: Al Salam Stadium (Note: The Wadi Degla v Al Ahly match was played at Al Salam Stadium instead of Petro Sport Stadium, both in Cairo, due to security concerns.); Referee: Said Hamza

15 December 2019 8	Al Ahly	1–0	Haras El Hodoud	Cairo
19:30 CAT (UTC+2)	Ashraf (yellow card) 71'; El Solia 81'	Report		Stadium: Cairo International Stadium; Referee: Ibrahim Nour El Din

19 December 2019 9	Ismaily	0–1	Al Ahly	Alexandria (Note: The Ismaily v Al Ahly match was played at Haras El Hodoud Stadium in Alexandria instead of Ismailia Stadium in Ismailia due to security concerns.)
19:30 CAT (UTC+2)	El Badry (yellow card) 82'	Report	Dieng (yellow card) 45+2'; Soliman 78'	Stadium: Haras El Hodoud Stadium; Referee: Mahmoud El Banna

23 December 2019 10	Al Ahly	4–0	Al Ittihad	Cairo
19:30 CAT (UTC+2)	Ashraf (yellow card) 30'; El Sheikh 45+3'; Magdy 54'; Azaro 66'; Maâloul 73' (pen.)	Report	El Azab (yellow card) 55'; N. El Sayed (yellow card) 55'; Rizk (yellow card) 72'	Stadium: Cairo International Stadium; Referee: Tarek Magdy

1 January 2020 11	Misr Lel Makkasa	0–2	Al Ahly	Cairo (Note: Misr Lel Makkasa play their home matches at Al Salam Stadium in Cairo instead of their regular stadium Faiyum Stadium in Faiyum.)
19:30 CAT (UTC+2)	Sobhy (yellow card) 20'; Mosaad (yellow card) 23'; Yassin (yellow card) 77'; Moses (yellow card) 84'	Report	Magdy (yellow card) 51', (goal) 80'; Maâloul 74' (pen.); Metwalli (yellow card) 84'	Stadium: Al Salam Stadium; Referee: Amin Omar

5 January 2020 12	Al Ahly	3–1	FC Masr	Cairo
19:30 CAT (UTC+2)	Ajayi 23'; Dieng (yellow card) 25'; M. Mohsen 51', 54'; Ashraf (yellow card) 74'	Report	El Sheikh 57'; Youssef (yellow card) 58'; Saleh (yellow card) 85'	Stadium: Cairo International Stadium; Referee: Mohamed Adel

15 January 2020 13	Al Ahly	5–0	Tanta	Cairo
19:30 CAT (UTC+2)	El Shahat 11'; Kahraba 79', 90+1'; El Sheikh 81'; M. Mohsen 89'	Report	Ghaly (yellow card) 45'	Stadium: Cairo International Stadium; Referee: Mahmoud Ashour

19 January 2020 14	Al Mokawloon Al Arab	0–2	Al Ahly	Cairo
19:30 CAT (UTC+2)	Salem (yellow card) 29'; Jaziri (yellow card) 45+2'	Report	El Shahat 20'; A. Fathy (yellow card) 38'; Rabia (yellow card) 61' (yellow-red card) 74'; Soliman 81'	Stadium: Al Salam Stadium (Note: The Al Mokawloon Al Arab v Al Ahly match was played at Al Salam Stadium instead of Osman Ahmed Osman Stadium, both in Cairo, due to security concerns.); Referee: Ahmed El Ghandour

6 February 2020 16	Pyramids	1–2	Al Ahly	Cairo
19:30 CAT (UTC+2)	Gabr 53'; Mansour (yellow card) 78' (yellow-red card) 90+3'; Issa (yellow card) 90+3'; Bakar (red card) 90+4'	Report	Maâloul (yellow card) 49'; Badji 77'; Ashraf (yellow card) 82'; Dieng 90+1'	Stadium: 30 June Stadium; Referee: Ibrahim Nour El Din

10 February 2020 17	Al Ahly	3–0	Tala'ea El Gaish	Cairo
19:30 CAT (UTC+2)	Rabia (yellow card) 19'; Ajayi 33'; El Solia 69'; Magdy 85'	Report	Shehata (yellow card) 82'; El Fil (yellow card) 84'; Stouhi (yellow card) 90+1'	Stadium: Cairo International Stadium; Referee: Mahmoud El Banna

14 February 2020 6	Al Ahly	3–0	Al Masry	Alexandria (Note: The Al Ahly v Al Masry match was played at Haras El Hodoud Stadium in Alexandria instead of Cairo International Stadium in Cairo due to security concerns.)
20:15 CAT (UTC+2)	Maâloul 10' (pen.); Rabia (yellow card) 26'; Soliman (yellow card) 34'; Ajayi 83'; Kahraba (yellow card) 85', (goal) 90+1'	Report	Shawky (yellow card) 12'; Simporé (yellow card) 27'; Attia (yellow card) 45+3'; Yasser (yellow card) 50'	Stadium: Haras El Hodoud Stadium; Referee: Mohamed El Hanafy

24 February 2020 (Note: The Al Ahly v Zamalek match, originally scheduled on 19 October 2019, was postponed due to security concerns.) 4	Al Ahly	2–0 (Awarded)	Zamalek	Cairo
20:30 CAT (UTC+2)		Report		Stadium: Cairo International Stadium; Referee: Gediminas Mažeika (Lithuania)
Note: Al Ahly were awarded a 2–0 win after Zamalek did not show up for the match.

11 March 2020 18	Al Ahly	1–1	Smouha	Cairo
19:30 CAT (UTC+2)	El Solial 90+3' (pen.)		Youssef Diop 69'	Stadium: Cairo International Stadium

9 August 2020 (Note: The Al Ahly v ENPPI match, originally scheduled on 24 January 2020, was postponed due to conflicting with Al Ahly v Étoile du Sahel match in the CAF Champions League, which is set to be played on 26 January 2020.) 15	Al Ahly	2–0	ENPPI	Cairo
20:00 CAT (UTC+2)	Ayman Ashraf (yellow card) 21'; Mohamed Hany 64'; Maâloul 90+5'	Summary	Ali Fawzy (yellow card) 26'; Mohamed Bassiouny (yellow card) 45'; Omar Bassam (yellow card) 90+2'	Stadium: Cairo International Stadium; Referee: (Egypt) Mahmoud El Banna

14 August 2020 19	El Entag El Harby	1–1	Al Ahly	Cairo
21:00 CAT (UTC+2)	Amr El Solia (yellow card) 30' (goal) 77'; Ramy Rabia (yellow card) 65'		Karim Afifi 77'; Moussa Diawara (yellow card) 65'	Stadium: Al Salam Stadium

17 August 2020 20	Al Ahly	3–0	Aswan	Cairo
21:00 CAT (UTC+2)	Geraldo 9'; Walid Soliman 83'; Aliou Badji 90+4'			Stadium: Cairo International Stadium

22 August 2020 21	Zamalek	3–1	Al Ahly	Cairo
21:00 CAT (UTC+2)	Zizo 13'; Mostafa Mohamed 71' (yellow card) 72'; Osama Faisal 90+3' (yellow card) 89'		Mohamed Hany (yellow card) 46'; Aliou Dieng (yellow card) 50'; Hamdy Fathy (yellow card) 50'; Yasser Ibrahim 62'; Amr El Solia (yellow card) 67'	Stadium: Cairo International Stadium

26 August 2020 22	Al Ahly	1–0	El Gouna	Cairo
21:00 CAT (UTC+2)	Aliou Dieng (yellow card) 13' (yellow-red card) 62'; Ahmed Fathy (yellow card) 89'; Marwan Mohsen 90+5'		Sobhi (yellow card) 40'; Mahmoud Shabrawy (yellow card) 90+6'; Islam Tarek (yellow card) 90+6'; Islam Mohareb (yellow card) 90+6'	Stadium: Cairo International Stadium

29 August 2020 23	Al Masry	0–2	Al Ahly	Alexandria
20:30 CAT (UTC+2)	Ahmed Yasser (yellow card) 8' (yellow-red card) 45+1'; Abdel Rahman Zein (yellow card) 90+1'		Aliou Badji 46'; Maâloul (yellow card) 49'; Hamdy Fathy 55'	Stadium: Borg El Arab Stadium

4 September 2020 24	Al Ahly	2–0	Wadi Degla	Cairo
20:00 CAT (UTC+2)	Marwan Mohsen 42'; Yasser Ibrahim (yellow card) 62'; Hamdy Fathy 90+4'		Marwan Hamdi (yellow card) 41'; Khaled Reda (yellow card) 90+5'	Stadium: Cairo International Stadium

7 September 2020 25	Haras El Hodoud	0–2	Al Ahly	Alexandria
20:30 CAT (UTC+2)	Walid Soliman 85'; Mohamed Magdy 90+6'			Stadium: Haras El Hodoud Stadium

11 September 2020 26	Al Ahly	3–0	Ismaily	Alexandria
20:30 CAT (UTC+2)	Aliou Badji 65'; El Sheikh 72'		Ibrahim Osama (yellow card) 69'; Mohamed El Shamy (yellow card) 71'; Ahmed Madbouly (yellow card) 90+1'	Stadium: Borg El Arab Stadium

14 September 2020 27	Al Ittihad	0–0	Al Ahly	Alexandria
20:30 CAT (UTC+2)	Kamar (yellow card) 46'; Raheel (yellow card) 67'; Mohamed (yellow card) 88'; Sayed Salem (yellow card) 90+5'		Fathy (yellow card) 55' (yellow-red card) 60'	Stadium: Borg El Arab Stadium; Referee: Ibrahim Nour El Din

19 September 2020 28	Al Ahly	0–0	Misr Lel Makkasa	Cairo
20:00 CAT (UTC+2)	Maâloul (yellow card) 39'		Mohamed Dabash (red card) 59'; Marey (yellow card) 87'	Stadium: Cairo Stadium; Referee: Mohamed Hanafy

23 September 2020 29	FC Masr	0–3	Al Ahly	Cairo
20:00 CAT (UTC+2)	Mostafa Soltan (yellow card) 52'; Moamen Ibrahim (yellow card) 81'; Willis Furtado (yellow card) 90'; Alaa Atta (yellow card) 90'		El Solia (pen.), 7'; Kahraba 57'; Ajayi 73'	Stadium: Cairo Military Academy Stadium; Referee: Mohamed Bassiouny

27 September 2020 30	Tanta	0–1	Al Ahly	Cairo
17:30 CAT (UTC+2)			El Solia (yellow card) 26' (goal) 79'; Ashraf (yellow card) 50'	Stadium: Al Salam Stadium

4 October 2020 31	Al Ahly	1–0	Al Mokawloon	Cairo
20:00 CAT (UTC+2)	El Solia (pen.), 40'; Yasser Ibrahim (yellow card) 50'Seifeddine Jaziri; Kahraba (yellow card) 50'; Ashraf (yellow card) 63'		Abed (yellow card) 89'; Jaziri (yellow card) 90'; Kabore (yellow card) 90+1'	Stadium: Cairo Stadium; Referee: Gehad Grisha

7 October 2020 32	Enppi	0–3	Al Ahly	Cairo
20:00 CAT (UTC+2)			Marwan Mohsen 3', 17'; Ajayi 80'	Stadium: Al Salam Stadium; Referee: Mohamed Yousef

11 October 2020 33	Al Ahly	0–0	Pyramids	Cairo
20:00 CAT (UTC+2)	Fathy (yellow card) 36'; El Solia (red card) 43'		El Said (yellow card) 29'; Farouk (yellow card) 34'; Bakry (yellow card) 45+4'; Hamdy (yellow card) 59'	Stadium: Cairo Stadium

31 October 2020 34	Tala'ea El Gaish	0–3	Al Ahly	Cairo
20:00 CAT (UTC+2)	Gamal (yellow card) 24'; Mohamed (yellow card) 28'		Walid Soliman 1'; Geraldo 18'; Kahraba 36' (yellow card) 37'	Stadium: Al Salam Stadium

=== Egypt Cup ===
Al Ahly entered the competition from the round of 32 and were given a home tie against Egyptian Second Division side Beni Suef. The bracket of the tournament was also decided at the time of the round of 32 draw; meaning that the path to the final for each time was decided prior to playing any matches. Also, all matches are played on stadiums selected by the Egyptian Football Association starting from the round of 16.

3 December 2019 Round of 32	Al Ahly	3–1	Beni Suef	Cairo
19:30 CAT (UTC+2)	Dieng (yellow card) 20'; El Shahat (yellow card) 33'; Azaro 67', 90+2'; El Sheikh 69'	Report	Ali (yellow card) 39'; Mahmoud (yellow card) 65'; Mahrous (yellow card) 76'; Abdel Razek 88'	Stadium: Cairo International Stadium; Referee: Mohamed Abbas

30 September 2020 Round of 16	Al Ahly	2–1	Tersana	Cairo
20:00 CAT (UTC+2)	Ajayi 7', 14'		Ibrahim Mansour 42'	Stadium: Al Salam Stadium

21 November 2020 Quarter-finals	Al Ahly	2–1	Abou Qir Fertilizers	Alexandria
17:00 CAT (UTC+2)	Soliman 15', 26' (pen.)		Kouyaté 38'	Stadium: Borg El Arab Stadium; Referee: Mohamed Salama

1 December 2020 Semi-finals	Al Ahly	2–1	Al Ittihad	Suez
20:00 CAT (UTC+2)	Magdy 71'; H. Fathy 89'	Report	Cissé 35'	Stadium: Suez Stadium; Referee: Mohamed Maarouf

5 December 2020 Final	Al Ahly	1–1 (a.e.t.) (3–2 p)	Tala'ea El Gaish	Alexandria
20:00 CAT	Kahraba 65'	Report	Mansi 90+2'	Stadium: Borg El Arab Stadium; Referee: Mohamed El Hanafy
	Penalties
	Maâloul (penalty scored); El Solia (penalty scored); Benoun (penalty scored); Ashraf (penalty missed); Magdy (penalty missed)		(penalty scored) Mohareb; (penalty missed) Mansi; (penalty missed) Sotohi; (penalty scored) Gamal; (penalty missed) El Sayed

=== Egyptian Super Cup ===
As the winners of the 2018–19 Egyptian Premier League, Al Ahly faced 2018–19 Egypt Cup winners Zamalek in the Egyptian Super Cup. The match was played on 20 February 2020 in the United Arab Emirates.

20 February 2020	Al Ahly	0–0 (3–4 p)	Zamalek	Abu Dhabi, United Arab Emirates
21:00 GST (UTC+4)	Ajayi (yellow card) 74'; Kahraba (red card) PSO	Report	Hamed (yellow card) 74'	Stadium: Mohammed bin Zayed Stadium; Referee: Svein Oddvar Moen (Norway)
	Penalties
	Maâloul (penalty scored); El Solia (penalty scored); Metwalli (penalty scored); Hany (penalty missed); Badji (penalty missed)		(penalty scored) Alaa; (penalty scored) Sassi; (penalty missed) Bencharki; (penalty scored) Hamed; (penalty scored) Gomaa

=== CAF Champions League ===
Al Ahly entered the competition for the 22nd consecutive time after winning the league in the previous season. Al Ahly were ranked 4th in the CAF 5-year ranking prior to the start of the 2019–20. As a result, they entered the competition from the preliminary round since only the top 3 ranked teams were given a bye to the first round.

==== Preliminary round ====
The draw for the preliminary round was held on 21 July 2019. Al Ahly were drawn against Atlabara from South Sudan.

11 August 2019 First leg	Atlabara (South Sudan)	0–4	(Egypt) Al Ahly	Alexandria, Egypt (Note: Teams from South Sudan played their home matches outside the country due to renovation process of Juba Stadium.)
19:00 CAT (UTC+2)	Mandela (yellow card) 70'	Report	Maâloul 12' (pen.); Azaro 32', 48'; El Solia (yellow card) 75'; El Sheikh 90+2'	Stadium: Borg El Arab Stadium; Attendance: 10,000; Referee: Brian Miiro Nsubuga (Uganda)

23 August 2019 Second leg	Al Ahly (Egypt)	9–0 (13–0 agg.)	(South Sudan) Atlabara	Alexandria, Egypt
19:00 CAT (UTC+2)	S. Mohsen 6', 40'; El Shahat 19', 46', 62', (yellow card) 28'; A. Fathy 45'; H. Fathy 55', 67'; Salim 81' (o.g.)	Report		Stadium: Borg El Arab Stadium; Attendance: 7,000; Referee: Lahlou Benbraham (Algeria)

==== First round ====
The draw for the first round was held on 21 July 2019 (after the preliminary round draw). Al Ahly were drawn against the winner of the tie involving Cano Sport from Equatorial Guinea and Mekelle 70 Enderta from Ethiopia, which was won by the former.

14 September 2019 First leg	Cano Sport (Equatorial Guinea)	0–2	(Egypt) Al Ahly	Malabo, Equatorial Guinea
17:00 WAT (UTC+1)		Report	Maâloul (yellow card) 42'; S. Mohsen 62'; Soliman 82'	Stadium: Estadio de Malabo; Referee: Ahmed Sékou Touré (Guinea)

28 September 2019 Second leg	Al Ahly (Egypt)	4–0 (6–0 agg.)	(Equatorial Guinea) Cano Sport	Alexandria, Egypt
21:00 CAT (UTC+2)	Dieng 8'; Ajayi 48'; El Shahat 55'; S. Mohsen 88'	Report		Stadium: Borg El Arab Stadium; Attendance: 7,000; Referee: Joshua Bondo (Botswana)

==== Group stage ====
The draw for the group stage was held on 9 October 2019. Al Ahly were drawn in Group B alongside Étoile du Sahel from Tunisia, Al Hilal from Sudan and FC Platinum from Zimbabwe.

Pos	Team	Pld	W	D	L	GF	GA	GD	Pts	Qualification
1	(Tunisia) Étoile du Sahel	6	4	0	2	8	3	+5	12	Advance to knockout stage
2	(Egypt) Al-Ahly	6	3	2	1	7	4	+3	11	Advance to knockout stage
3	(Sudan) Al-Hilal	6	3	1	2	7	6	+1	10	
4	(Zimbabwe) FC Platinum	6	0	1	5	2	11	−9	1	

Source: CAF
Rules for classification: Tiebreakers

29 November 2019 1	Étoile du Sahel (Tunisia)	1–0	(Egypt) Al Ahly	Radès, Tunisia
20:00 WAT (UTC+1)	Ben Ouannes (yellow card) 28'; Chikhaoui 50'; Kechrida (yellow card) 90+4'	Report	Ashraf (red card) 13'; Ajayi (yellow card) 45+2'	Stadium: Stade Olympique de Radès; Referee: Joshua Bondo (Botswana)

6 December 2019 2	Al Ahly (Egypt)	2–1	(Sudan) Al Hilal	Cairo, Egypt
21:00 CAT (UTC+2)	El Shahat 15'; Ramadan 37' (pen.)	Report	Boya (yellow card) 36'; Ali (yellow card) 83'; Abuaagla (yellow card) 89'; El Tahir 90+8'	Stadium: Al Salam Stadium; Referee: Lahlou Benbraham (Algeria)

28 December 2019 3	Al Ahly (Egypt)	2–0	(Zimbabwe) FC Platinum	Cairo, Egypt
21:00 CAT (UTC+2)	Soliman 8', 69' (pen.); El Shahat (yellow card) 90+2'	Report	Chinyengetere (yellow card) 9'; Bello (yellow card) 22'; Chafa (yellow card) 47'	Stadium: Al Salam Stadium; Referee: Georges Gatogato (Burundi)

11 January 2020 4	FC Platinum (Zimbabwe)	1–1	(Egypt) Al Ahly	Bulawayo, Zimbabwe
15:00 CAT (UTC+2)	Ngala 19'; Chikwende (yellow card) 90+2'	Report	Rabia (yellow card) 22'; M. Mohsen 52'; A. Fathy (yellow card) 68'	Stadium: Barbourfields Stadium; Referee: Jean-Jacques Ndala Ngambo (DR Congo)

26 January 2020 (Note: The Al Ahly v Étoile du Sahel match, originally scheduled on 24 January 2020, was postponed for 48 hours following request from the Egyptian Football Association due to security concerns ahead of the anniversary of the Egyptian revolution of 2011.) 5	Al Ahly (Egypt)	1–0	(Tunisia) Étoile du Sahel	Cairo, Egypt
21:00 CAT (UTC+2)	Ajayi 32'; M. Mohsen (yellow card) 81'; Kahraba (yellow card) 83'	Report	Ben Amor (yellow card) 3'; Aribi (yellow card) 90+3'	Stadium: Al Salam Stadium; Referee: Victor Gomes (South Africa)

1 February 2020 6	Al Hilal (Sudan)	1–1	(Egypt) Al Ahly	Omdurman, Sudan
21:00 CAT (UTC+2)	Merghani (yellow card) 3'; El Shighail (yellow card) 30'; Mohamed (yellow card) 43'; Mokhtar (yellow card) 70'; Omer 90+6'	Report	Ashraf (yellow card) 5'; Dieng (yellow card) 25'; Magdy 48'	Stadium: Al Hilal Stadium; Referee: Rédouane Jiyed (Morocco)

==== Quarter-finals ====
The draw for the quarter-finals was held on 5 February 2020. Al Ahly were drawn against Mamelodi Sundowns from South Africa.

29 February 2020 First leg	Al Ahly (Egypt)	2–0	(South Africa) Mamelodi Sundowns	Cairo, Egypt
18:00 CAT (UTC+2)	Maâloul 56', 68' (pen.)	Report		Stadium: Cairo International Stadium; Attendance: 40,000; Referee: Jean-Jacques Ndala Ngambo (DRCongo)

7 March 2020 Second leg	Mamelodi Sundowns (South Africa)	1–1 (1–3 agg.)	(Egypt) Al Ahly	Pretoria, South Africa
15:00 SAST (UTC+2)	Sirino 27'	Report	Maboe 21' (o.g.)	Stadium: Lucas Masterpieces Moripe Stadium; Referee: Bakary Gassama (Gambia)

==== Semi-finals ====
17 October 2020 First leg	Wydad Casablanca (Morocco)	0–2	(Egypt) Al-Ahly	Casablanca
21:00 CAT (UTC+2)		Report	Magdy 4'; Maâloul 62' (pen.)	Stadium: Stade Mohamed V Attendance: 0 Referee: Janny Sikazwe (Zambia)

23 October 2020 Second leg	Al Ahly (Egypt)	3–1 (5–1 agg.)	(Morocco) Wydad Casablanca	Cairo, Egypt
21:00 CAT (UTC+2)	Mohsen 5'; El Shahat 26'; Ibrahim 59'	Report	El Moutaraji 82'	Stadium: Cairo International Stadium; Attendance: 0 Referee: Victor Gomes (South Africa)

==== Final ====
27 November 2020
19:00 GMT
(21:00 UTC+2)

Zamalek (Egypt)	1–2	(Egypt) Al-Ahly
Shikabala 31'	Report	El Solia 5'; Magdy 86'

Cairo International Stadium, Cairo
Referee: Mustapha Ghorbal (Algeria)

Zamalek	Al-Ahly

== Statistics ==
=== Appearances and goals ===
As of 10 February 2020

No.	Pos	Player	Egyptian Premier League		Egypt Cup		Egyptian Super Cup		CAF Champions League		Total	
No.	Pos	Player	Apps	Goals	Apps	Goals	Apps	Goals	Apps	Goals	Apps	Goals
1	GK	(Egypt) Sherif Ekramy	0	0	1	0	0	0	0	0	1	0
4	DF	(Egypt) Mahmoud Metwalli	5+1	0	0	0	0	0	2+2	0	10	0
5	DF	(Egypt) Ramy Rabia	11	0	0	0	0	0	8+1	0	20	0
6	DF	(Egypt) Yasser Ibrahim	3	0	1	0	0	0	2+1	0	7	0
7	FW	(Egypt) Ramadan Sobhi	5+1	4	0	0	0	0	4	1	10	5
8	MF	(Egypt) Hamdy Fathy	3	1	0	0	0	0	3	2	6	3
9	FW	(Egypt) Marwan Mohsen	6+2	3	0+1	0	0	0	4+1	1	14	4
10	MF	(Egypt) Saleh Gomaa	0	0	0	0	0	0	1	0	1	0
11	MF	(Egypt) Walid Soliman	2+11	6	1	0	0	0	4+3	3	21	9
12	DF	(Egypt) Ayman Ashraf	11	0	1	0	0	0	7+1	0	20	0
13	GK	(Egypt) Ali Lotfi	0	0	0	0	0	0	2	0	2	0
14	MF	(Egypt) Hussein El Shahat	10+2	5	1	0	0	0	7+1	5	21	10
15	MF	(Mali) Aliou Dieng	6+2	1	1	0	0	0	5+3	1	17	2
16	GK	(Egypt) Mohamed El Shenawy	14	0	0	0	0	0	8	0	22	0
17	MF	(Egypt) Amr El Solia	13	2	0	0	0	0	10	0	23	2
18	FW	(Senegal) Aliou Badji	0+1	1	0	0	0	0	0+2	0	3	1
19	MF	(Egypt) Mohamed Magdy	14	4	0	0	0	0	6	1	20	5
20	DF	(Egypt) Saad Samir	1+1	0	0	0	0	0	1	0	3	0
21	DF	(Tunisia) Ali Maâloul	11	2	0	0	0	0	6	1	17	3
22	MF	(Egypt) Ahmed El Sheikh	6+1	3	1	1	0	0	4+2	1	14	5
23	DF	(Egypt) Mahmoud Wahid	2	0	1	0	0	0	3	0	6	0
24	DF	(Egypt) Ahmed Fathy	4+2	0	0+1	0	0	0	7	1	14	1
25	MF	(Egypt) Hossam Ashour	0+3	0	1	0	0	0	0+1	0	5	0
26	FW	(Egypt) Mahmoud Kahraba	0+5	2	0	0	0	0	0+3	0	8	2
28	FW	(Nigeria) Junior Ajayi	12+1	4	0	0	0	0	8+1	2	22	6
29	FW	(Angola) Geraldo	3+1	0	0+1	0	0	0	1+3	0	9	0
30	DF	(Egypt) Mohamed Hany	11+1	0	0	0	0	0	4+1	0	17	0
35	MF	(Egypt) Karim Walid	0	0	0	0	0	0	0	0	0	0
36	MF	(Egypt) Mohamed Mahmoud	0	0	0	0	0	0	0	0	0	0
72	GK	(Egypt) Mostafa Shobair	0	0	0	0	0	0	0	0	0	0
Players transferred out during the season
2	DF	(Egypt) Hussein El Sayed	0	0	0	0	0	0	0	0	0	0
9	FW	(Morocco) Walid Azaro	1+6	2	1	2	0	0	2+2	2	12	6
27	FW	(Egypt) Salah Mohsen	0+1	0	0	0	0	0	1+2	4	4	4
38	MF	(Egypt) Amar Hamdy	0	0	1	0	0	0	0	0	1	0

=== Goalscorers ===
As of 24 February 2020

Rank	Position	Name	Egyptian Premier League	Egypt Cup	Egyptian Super Cup	CAF Champions League	Total
1	MF	(Egypt) Hussein El Shahat	5	0	0	5	10
2	FW	(Egypt) Walid Soliman	6	0	0	3	9
3	FW	(Nigeria) Junior Ajayi	5	0	0	2	7
4	FW	(Morocco) Walid Azaro	2	2	0	2	6
5	MF	(Egypt) Mohamed Magdy	4	0	0	1	5
5	MF	(Egypt) Ahmed El Sheikh	3	1	0	1	5
5	FW	(Egypt) Ramadan Sobhi	4	0	0	1	5
8	DF	(Tunisia) Ali Maâloul	3	0	0	1	4
8	FW	(Egypt) Marwan Mohsen	3	0	0	1	4
8	FW	(Egypt) Salah Mohsen	0	0	0	4	4
11	MF	(Egypt) Hamdy Fathy	1	0	0	2	3
11	FW	(Egypt) Mahmoud Kahraba	3	0	0	0	3
13	MF	(Mali) Aliou Dieng	1	0	0	1	2
13	MF	(Egypt) Amr El Solia	2	0	0	0	2
15	FW	(Senegal) Aliou Badji	1	0	0	0	1
15	DF	(Egypt) Ahmed Fathy	0	0	0	1	1
Own goal			0	0	0	1	1
Awarded goal			2	0	0	0	2
Total			45	3	0	26	74

=== Clean sheets ===
As of 24 February 2020

Rank	Name	Egyptian Premier League	Egypt Cup	Egyptian Super Cup	CAF Champions League	Total
1	(Egypt) Mohamed El Shenawy	12	0	1	4	17
2	(Egypt) Ali Lotfi	0	0	0	2	2
3	(Egypt) Sherif Ekramy	0	0	0	0	0
4	(Egypt) Mostafa Shobair	0	0	0	0	0
Total		12	0	1	6	19
