= 2020 CAF Champions League final =

African football tournament final

- Event: 2019–20 CAF Champions League
Zamalek	Al Ahly
(Egypt)	(Egypt)
1	2
- Date: 27 November 2020
- Venue: Cairo International Stadium, Cairo, Egypt
- Man of the Match: Mohamed Magdy (Al-Ahly)
- Referee: Mustapha Ghorbal (Algeria)
- Attendance: 0
- Weather: Haze; 17 °C (63 °F); 72% humidity

The 2020 CAF Champions League final, known as The Final of the Century was the final of the 2019–20 CAF Champions League, the 56th edition of Africa's premier club football tournament organized by the Confederation of African Football (CAF), and the 24th edition under the current CAF Champions League title.

For the first time, the final was played as a single match at a venue pre-selected by CAF. It was originally scheduled to be played on 29 May 2020 at the Japoma Stadium in Douala, Cameroon. However, due to the COVID-19 pandemic, the match was postponed and Cameroon decided to withdraw from hosting. Instead, the final was played on 27 November 2020 at the Cairo International Stadium in Cairo, Egypt.

The final featured two Egyptian clubs, Al-Ahly and Zamalek, which made this the first CAF Champions League final to feature two clubs from the same country, as well as the first final to feature two clubs from the same city. As Al-Ahly and Zamalek were also Egypt's most successful clubs both in domestic and international competitions and share an intense rivalry, the final between two teams was considered as the most important game to have ever been played between two clubs.

Al-Ahly defeated Zamalek and won 2–1, winning their record-extending ninth title and their first since 2013. They also earned the right to play against the 2019–20 CAF Confederation Cup winners RS Berkane in the 2020–21 CAF Super Cup, and qualified for the 2020 FIFA Club World Cup in Qatar.

== Teams ==
In the following table, finals until 1996 were in the African Cup of Champions Club era, since 1997 were in the CAF Champions League era.

Team	Zone	Previous finals appearances (bold indicates winners)
(Egypt) Zamalek	UNAF (North Africa)	7 (**1984**, **1986**, **1993**, 1994, **1996**, **2002**, 2016)
(Egypt) Al Ahly	UNAF (North Africa)	12 (**1982**, 1983, **1987**, **2001**, **2005**, **2006**, 2007, **2008**, **2012**, **2013**, 2017, 2018)

== Venue ==
=== Original host selection ===
The CAF Executive Committee decided in June 2019 that the final would be played as a single match. Three member associations submitted bids during the period of 11–20 February 2020:
The CAF Emergency Committee made the final decision on 12 March 2020, and Japoma Stadium, Douala was officially announced as the final venue on 16 March 2020.

Country	Stadium	City	Capacity	Notes
Cameroon	Japoma Stadium	Douala	50,000	
Morocco	Stade Mohammed V	Casablanca	67,000	Hosted the 1988 African Cup of Nations Final
Tunisia	Stade Hammadi Agrebi	Radès	60,000	Hosted the 2004 African Cup of Nations Final

=== Postponement and relocation ===
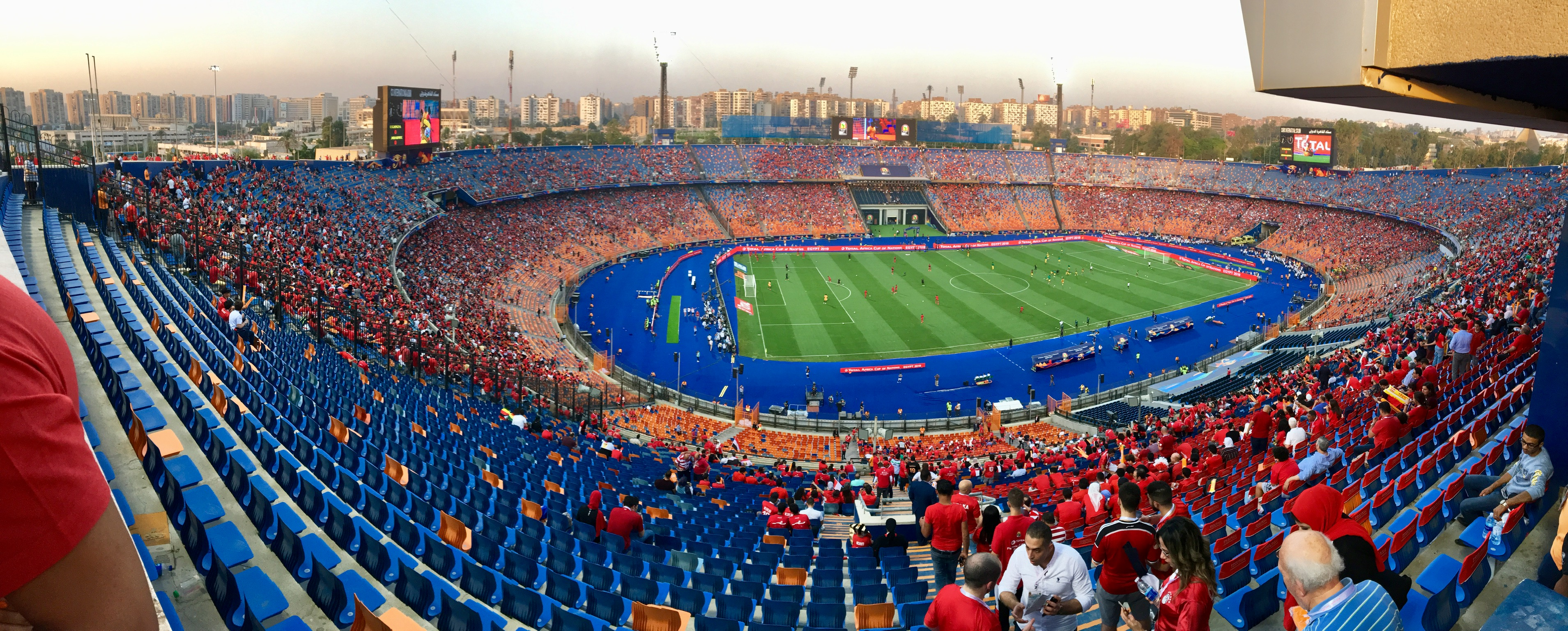
Cairo International Stadium in Cairo, Egypt, hosted the final.

On 18 April 2020, the CAF announced that the final had been postponed until further notice due to the COVID-19 pandemic.

In July, the Cameroonian Football Federation announced that they had withdrawn from hosting the final.

On 3 August 2020, the CAF announced that the final would be played on 16 or 17 October 2020. It would be played in Egypt if both semi-finalists from Egypt, Al-Ahly and Zamalek, reached the final, or in Morocco if both semi-finalists from Morocco, Raja Casablanca and Wydad Casablanca, reached the final. If one team from Egypt and one team from Morocco reached the final, it was initially decided that the final would be played in a neutral country.

On 10 September 2020, the CAF announced that at the request of the Royal Moroccan Football Federation, the final was rescheduled to 6 November 2020.

It was later decided that if the final were between a team from Egypt and a team from Morocco, the final would be played in either Egypt or Morocco, to be decided by a draw, which was held on 16 October 2020 in Casablanca, Morocco prior to the semi-final first legs, and the country drawn was Egypt.

Egypt was confirmed as the host country of the final after Al-Ahly eliminated Wydad Casablanca in the semi-final and reached the final on 23 October 2020.

The semi-final second leg between Zamalek and Raja Casablanca was postponed due to Raja Casablanca being required by Moroccan authorities to self-isolate until 27 October after eight players testing positive for the COVID-19 virus, with the total number of cases increasing to fourteen the following day, and as a result, the CAF announced on 30 October 2020 that the final was further postponed to 27 November 2020.

Borg El Arab Stadium, Alexandria was initially announced as the final venue, but it was decided in early November to relocate the match to Cairo International Stadium, Cairo due to expected heavy rains.

On 25 November 2020, the CAF and the Egyptian Football Association confirmed the final would be played behind closed doors.

== Road to the final ==
Note: In all results below, the score of the finalist is given first (H: home; A: away).

(Egypt) Zamalek				Round	(Egypt) Al Ahly			
Opponent	Agg.	1st leg	2nd leg	Qualifying rounds	Opponent	Agg.	1st leg	2nd leg
(Somalia) Dekedaha	13–0	7–0 (A)	6–0 (H)	Preliminary round	(South Sudan) Atlabara	13–0	4–0 (A)	9–0 (H)
(Senegal) Génération Foot	2–2 (a)	1–2 (A)	1–0 (H)	First round	(Equatorial Guinea) Cano Sport	6–0	2–0 (A)	4–0 (H)
Opponent	Result			Group stage	Opponent	Result		
(Democratic Republic of the Congo) TP Mazembe	0–3 (A)			Matchday 1	(Tunisia) Étoile du Sahel	0–1 (A)		
(Angola) 1º de Agosto	2–0 (H)			Matchday 2	(Sudan) Al-Hilal	2–1 (H)		
(Zambia) ZESCO United	1–1 (A)			Matchday 3	(Zimbabwe) FC Platinum	1–0 (H)		
(Zambia) ZESCO United	2–0 (H)			Matchday 4	(Zimbabwe) FC Platinum	1–1 (A)		
(Democratic Republic of the Congo) TP Mazembe	0–0 (H)			Matchday 5	(Tunisia) Étoile du Sahel	1–0 (H)		
(Angola) 1º de Agosto	0–0 (A)			Matchday 6	(Sudan) Al-Hilal	1–1 (A)		
**Group A runners-up**: Pos / Team / Pld / Pts; 1 / (Democratic Republic of the Congo) TP Mazembe / 6 / **14**; **2** / (Egypt) Zamalek / **6** / **9**; 3 / (Angola) 1º de Agosto / 6 / **4**; 4 / (Zambia) ZESCO United / 6 / **3**; Source: CAF				Final standings	**Group B runners-up**: Pos / Team / Pld / Pts; 1 / (Tunisia) Étoile du Sahel / 6 / **12**; **2** / (Egypt) Al-Ahly / **6** / **11**; 3 / (Sudan) Al-Hilal / 6 / **10**; 4 / (Zimbabwe) FC Platinum / 6 / **1**; Source: CAF			
Opponent	Agg.	1st leg	2nd leg	Knockout stage	Opponent	Agg.	1st leg	2nd leg
(Tunisia) Espérance de Tunis	3–2	3–1 (H)	0–1 (A)	Quarter-finals	(South Africa) Mamelodi Sundowns	3–1	2–0 (H)	1–1 (A)
(Morocco) Raja CA	4–1	1–0 (A)	3–1 (H)	Semi-finals	(Morocco) Wydad AC	5–1	2–0 (A)	3–1 (H)

== Format ==
The final was played as a single match at a pre-selected venue, with the winner of semi-final 1 according to the knockout stage draw designated as the "home" team for administrative purposes. If scores were level after full time, extra time was not to be played and the winner was to be decided by a penalty shoot-out (Regulations Article III. 28).

== Officials ==
On 26 November 2020, CAF named Algerian referee Mustapha Ghorbal as the referee for the match. Ghorbal had been a FIFA referee since 2014 and officiated two fixtures in the CAF Champions League during the 2019–20 season, including a match for Zamalek against Espérance de Tunis in the quarter-finals, which was won by the latter 1–0 thanks to a penalty. His compatriots Abdelhak Etchiali and Mokrane Gourari were chosen as the assistant referees, while Janny Sikazwe of Zambia was chosen as the fourth official. Moroccan referee Redouane Jiyed was named the video assistant referee, but his assistants were not announced prior to the match.

A few hours before the start of the match, CAF announced that Redouane Jiyed had tested positive for COVID-19 and was excluded from the final as a result. Janny Sikazwe, who was originally appointed as the fourth official, was given the role of the video assistant referee, while Egyptian referee Ibrahim Nour El Din was named the new fourth official for the match. The identity of the assistant video assistant referees was still known at this time.

== Match ==
=== Summary ===
El Solia opened the scoring for Al Ahly in the 5th minute with a downward header from four yards out a corner on the right. Shikabala equalized for Zamalek in the 31st minute when he cut in from the right before shooting left-footed form the edge of the penalty area to the top left corner of the net past Mohamed El Shenawy who did not move. Afsha got the winning goal for Al Ahly in the 86th minute when he controlled the ball on his knee after it was cleared by Mahmoud Alaa, before volleying to the right corner of the net with his right foot from outside the penalty area.

=== Details ===
27 November 2020
19:00 GMT
(21:00 UTC+2)

Zamalek (Egypt)	1–2	(Egypt) Al Ahly
Shikabala 31'	Report	El Solia 5'; Afsha 86'

Cairo International Stadium, Cairo
Attendance: 0 (Note: The match was played behind closed doors due to the COVID-19 pandemic in Africa.)
Referee: Mustapha Ghorbal (Algeria)

**Zamalek**	**Al Ahly**

GK	1	(Egypt) Mohamed Abou Gabal
RB	14	(Egypt) Ahmed Eid
CB	5	(Egypt) Mohamed Abdel Ghani
CB	4	(Egypt) Mahmoud Alaa
LB	23	(Egypt) Islam Gaber		(substituted off) 90+2'
CM	3	(Egypt) Tarek Hamed
CM	13	(Tunisia) Ferjani Sassi	(yellow card) 90+3'
RW	25	(Egypt) Ahmed "Zizo" Sayed
AM	10	(Egypt) Mahmoud Shikabala (c)		(substituted off) 55'
LW	20	(Morocco) Achraf Bencharki
CF	15	(Egypt) Mostafa Mohamed	(red card) 90+7'
Substitutes:
GK	16	(Egypt) Mahmoud Genesh
DF	6	(Egypt) Mohamed Abdel Salam
DF	7	(Egypt) Hazem Emam
FW	2	(Democratic Republic of the Congo) Kabongo Kasongo		(substituted on) 55'
FW	9	(Egypt) Omar El Said		(substituted on) 90+2'
FW	18	(Egypt) Karim Bambo
FW	27	(Morocco) Mohamed Ounajem
Manager:
(Portugal) Jaime Pacheco

GK	16	(Egypt) Mohamed El Shenawy (c)	(yellow card) 90+5'
RB	30	(Egypt) Mohamed Hany	(yellow card) 90+4'
CB	6	(Egypt) Yasser Ibrahim
CB	12	(Egypt) Ayman Ashraf
LB	21	(Tunisia) Ali Maâloul
CM	17	(Egypt) Amr El Solia	(yellow card) 73'
CM	8	(Egypt) Hamdy Fathy
RW	14	(Egypt) Hussein El Shahat	(red card) 90+6'
AM	19	(Egypt) Mohamed "Afsha" Magdy	(yellow card) 88'	(substituted off) 90+1'
LW	28	(Nigeria) Junior Ajayi		(substituted off) 67'
CF	18	(Egypt) Marwan Mohsen		(substituted off) 90+2'
Substitutes:
GK	13	(Egypt) Ali Lotfi
DF	2	(Egypt) Mahmoud Wahid
DF	3	(Egypt) Ramy Rabia		(substituted on) 90+1'
MF	22	(Egypt) Ahmed El Sheikh
FW	7	(Egypt) Mahmoud Kahraba		(substituted on) 90+2'
FW	9	(Senegal) Aliou Badji
FW	29	(Angola) Geraldo		(substituted on) 67'
Manager:
(South Africa) Pitso Mosimane

Man of the Match:
Mohamed Magdy
(Al-Ahly)

Assistant referees:
Abdelhak Etchiali (Algeria)
Mokrane Gourari (Algeria)
Fourth official:
Ibrahim Nour El Din (Egypt)
Video assistant referee:
Janny Sikazwe (Zambia)
Assistant video assistant referees:
Zakhele Siwela (South Africa)
Gerson Emiliano dos Santos (Angola)

**Match rules**

- 90 minutes.
- Penalty shoot-out if scores level.
- Seven named substitutes, of which up to five may be used. (Note: Each team was only given three opportunities to make substitutions, excluding substitutions made at half-time.)

=== Statistics ===
First half
Statistic	Zamalek	Al Ahly
Goals scored	1	1
Total shots	8	3
Shots on target	3	3
Saves	2	2
Ball possession	54%	46%
Corner kicks	4	1
Yellow cards	0	0
Red cards	0	0

Second half
Statistic	Zamalek	Al Ahly
Goals scored	0	1
Total shots	4	6
Shots on target	1	2
Saves	1	1
Ball possession	47%	53%
Corner kicks	3	2
Yellow cards	1	4
Red cards	1	1

Overall
Statistic	Zamalek	Al Ahly
Goals scored	1	2
Total shots	12	9
Shots on target	4	5
Saves	3	3
Ball possession	51%	49%
Corner kicks	7	3
Yellow cards	1	4
Red cards	1	1

== See also ==
- 2020 CAF Confederation Cup Final
- 2020–21 CAF Super Cup
- Cairo derby
