= 2019–20 CAF Champions League group stage =

- Dates: 29 November 2019 – 1 February 2020

Tournament statistics
- Matches played: 48
- Goals scored: 102 (2.13 per match)

The 2019–20 CAF Champions League group stage started on 29 November 2019 and ended on 1 February 2020. A total of 16 teams competed in the group stage to decide the eight places in the knockout stage of the 2019–20 CAF Champions League.

== Draw ==
The draw for the group stage was held on 9 October 2019, 20:00 CAT (UTC+2), at the Hilton Pyramids Golf in Cairo, Egypt. The 16 teams, all winners of the first round of qualifying, were drawn into four groups of four.

The teams were seeded by their performances in the CAF competitions for the previous five seasons (CAF 5-year ranking points shown in parentheses). Each group contained one team from each of Pot 1, Pot 2, Pot 3, and Pot 4, and each team was drawn into one of the positions in their group.

Pot	Pot 1	Pot 2	Pot 3	Pot 4
Teams	(Tunisia) Espérance de Tunis (63.5 pts); (Democratic Republic of the Congo) TP Mazembe (63 pts); (Morocco) Wydad AC (63 pts); (Egypt) Al-Ahly (57 pts)	(Tunisia) Étoile du Sahel (50 pts); (South Africa) Mamelodi Sundowns (49 pts); (Egypt) Zamalek (44 pts) (Note: Since the identity of the winners of the first round tie between Zamalek and Génération Foot was not known at the time of the draw, the ranking of the higher-ranked team Zamalek (44 pts) was used for seeding of the draw.); (Morocco) Raja Casablanca (25 pts)	(Algeria) USM Alger (25 pts); (Zambia) ZESCO United (24.5 pts); (Democratic Republic of the Congo) AS Vita Club (24 pts); (Sudan) Al-Hilal (19 pts)	(Angola) 1º de Agosto (16 pts); (Zimbabwe) FC Platinum (5 pts); (Angola) Petro de Luanda (2.5 pts); (Algeria) JS Kabylie

== Format ==
In each group, teams play against each other home-and-away in a round-robin format. The group winners and runners-up advance to the quarter-finals of the knockout stage.

=== Tiebreakers ===
Teams are ranked according to points (3 points for a win, 1 point for a draw, 0 points for a loss). If tied on points, tiebreakers are applied in the following order (Regulations III. 20 & 21):

1. Points in head-to-head matches among tied teams;
2. Goal difference in head-to-head matches among tied teams;
3. Goals scored in head-to-head matches among tied teams;
4. Away goals scored in head-to-head matches among tied teams;
5. If more than two teams are tied, and after applying all head-to-head criteria above, a subset of teams are still tied, all head-to-head criteria above are reapplied exclusively to this subset of teams;
6. Goal difference in all group matches;
7. Goals scored in all group matches;
8. Away goals scored in all group matches;
9. Drawing of lots.

== Schedule ==
The schedule of each matchday is as follows. Effective from the Champions League group stage, matches are played on Fridays and Saturdays. Kick-off times are fixed at 13:00 (Saturdays only), 16:00 and 19:00 GMT.

Note: Positions for scheduling do not use the seeding pots, e.g. Team 1 is not necessarily the team from Pot 1 in the draw.

Matchday	Dates		Matches
Matchday	Original dates	Revised dates	Matches
Matchday 1	29–30 November 2019		Team 1 vs. Team 4, Team 2 vs. Team 3
Matchday 2	6–7 December 2019		Team 3 vs. Team 1, Team 4 vs. Team 2
Matchday 3	27–28 December 2019		Team 4 vs. Team 3, Team 1 vs. Team 2
Matchday 4	14–15 February 2020	10–11 January 2020	Team 3 vs. Team 4, Team 2 vs. Team 1
Matchday 5	21–22 February 2020	24–25 January 2020	Team 4 vs. Team 1, Team 3 vs. Team 2
Matchday 6	6–7 March 2020	31 January – 1 February 2020	Team 1 vs. Team 3, Team 2 vs. Team 4

== Groups ==
Times are GMT as listed by CAF (local times, even if not different, are in parentheses).

=== Group A ===
Pos	Team	Pld	W	D	L	GF	GA	GD	Pts	Qualification	TPM	ZAM	AGO	ZES
1	(Democratic Republic of the Congo) TP Mazembe	6	4	2	0	11	4	+7	14	Advance to knockout stage	—	3–0	2–1	3–1
2	(Egypt) Zamalek	6	2	3	1	5	4	+1	9	Advance to knockout stage	0–0	—	2–0	2–0
3	(Angola) 1º de Agosto	6	0	4	2	4	7	−3	4		1–1	0–0	—	1–1
4	(Zambia) ZESCO United	6	0	3	3	5	10	−5	3		1–2	1–1	1–1	—

Source: CAF
Rules for classification: Tiebreakers
30 November 2019
13:00 (15:00 UTC+2)

TP Mazembe (Democratic Republic of the Congo)	3–0	(Egypt) Zamalek
Muleka 60', 84'; Mputu 66'	Report

Stade TP Mazembe, Lubumbashi
Referee: Mahamadou Keita (Mali)
30 November 2019
16:00 (17:00 UTC+1)

1º de Agosto (Angola)	1–1	(Zambia) ZESCO United
Mabululu 9'	Report	Mwape 16'

Estádio 11 de Novembro, Luanda
Referee: Andofetra Rakotojaona (Madagascar)

7 December 2019
16:00 (18:00 UTC+2)

ZESCO United (Zambia)	1–2	(Democratic Republic of the Congo) TP Mazembe
Kalengo 67'	Report	Muleka 10', 63'

Levy Mwanawasa Stadium, Ndola
Referee: Youssef Essrayri (Tunisia)
7 December 2019
19:00 (21:00 UTC+2)

Zamalek (Egypt)	2–0	(Angola) 1º de Agosto
Bencharki 16', 68'	Report

Al Salam Stadium, Cairo
Referee: Louis Hakizimana (Rwanda)

27 December 2019
16:00 (17:00 UTC+1)

1º de Agosto (Angola)	1–1	(Democratic Republic of the Congo) TP Mazembe
Mabululu 12'	Report	Kalaba 8'

Estádio 11 de Novembro, Luanda
Referee: Davies Omweno (Kenya)
28 December 2019
13:00 (15:00 UTC+2)

ZESCO United (Zambia)	1–1	(Egypt) Zamalek
Aladeokun 78'	Report	Mostafa 72'

Levy Mwanawasa Stadium, Ndola
Referee: Ahmad Heeralall (Mauritius)

10 January 2020
19:00 (21:00 UTC+2)

Zamalek (Egypt)	2–0	(Zambia) ZESCO United
Bencharki 4'; Mostafa 89'	Report

Al Salam Stadium, Cairo
Referee: Bamlak Tessema Weyesa (Ethiopia)
11 January 2020
13:00 (15:00 UTC+2)

TP Mazembe (Democratic Republic of the Congo)	2–1	(Angola) 1º de Agosto
Ushindi 59'; Muleka 68'	Report	Mabululu 8'

Stade TP Mazembe, Lubumbashi
Referee: Souleiman Ahmed Djama (Djibouti)

24 January 2020
19:00 (21:00 UTC+2)

Zamalek (Egypt)	0–0	(Democratic Republic of the Congo) TP Mazembe
	Report

Al Salam Stadium, Cairo
Referee: Maguette N'Diaye (Senegal)
25 January 2020
16:00 (18:00 UTC+2)

ZESCO United (Zambia)	1–1	(Angola) 1º de Agosto
Kalengo 50'	Report	Ary Papel 69'

Levy Mwanawasa Stadium, Ndola
Referee: Mehdi Abid Charef (Algeria)

1 February 2020
13:00 (14:00 UTC+1)

1º de Agosto (Angola)	0–0	(Egypt) Zamalek
	Report

Estádio 11 de Novembro, Luanda
Referee: Tsegay Mogos Teklu (Eritrea)
1 February 2020
13:00 (15:00 UTC+2)

TP Mazembe (Democratic Republic of the Congo)	3–1	(Zambia) ZESCO United
Muleka 32' (pen.), 79'; Ushindi 61'	Report	Kalengo 34'

Stade TP Mazembe, Lubumbashi
Referee: Norman Matemera (Zimbabwe)

=== Group B ===
Pos	Team	Pld	W	D	L	GF	GA	GD	Pts	Qualification	ESS	AHL	HIL	PLA
1	(Tunisia) Étoile du Sahel	6	4	0	2	8	3	+5	12	Advance to knockout stage	—	1–0	0–1	2–0
2	(Egypt) Al-Ahly	6	3	2	1	7	4	+3	11	Advance to knockout stage	1–0	—	2–1	2–0
3	(Sudan) Al-Hilal	6	3	1	2	7	6	+1	10		1–2	1–1	—	2–1
4	(Zimbabwe) FC Platinum	6	0	1	5	2	11	−9	1		0–3	1–1	0–1	—

Source: CAF
Rules for classification: Tiebreakers
29 November 2019
19:00 (20:00 UTC+1)

Étoile du Sahel (Tunisia)	1–0	(Egypt) Al-Ahly
Chikhaoui 50'	Report

Stade Olympique de Radès, Tunis (Note: Étoile du Sahel played their home matches at Stade Olympique de Radès, Tunis, instead of their regular home stadium Stade Olympique de Sousse, Sousse, which is undergoing renovation.)
Referee: Joshua Bondo (Botswana)
29 November 2019
19:00 (21:00 UTC+2)

Al-Hilal (Sudan)	2–1	(Zimbabwe) FC Platinum
Aldai 26', 70'	Report	Tigere 81'

Al-Hilal Stadium, Omdurman
Referee: Bakary Gassama (Gambia)

6 December 2019
19:00 (21:00 UTC+2)

Al-Ahly (Egypt)	2–1	(Sudan) Al-Hilal
El Shahat 15'; Ramadan 37' (pen.)	Report	El Tahir 90+8'

Al Salam Stadium, Cairo
Referee: Lahlou Benbraham (Algeria)
7 December 2019
13:00 (15:00 UTC+2)

FC Platinum (Zimbabwe)	0–3	(Tunisia) Étoile du Sahel
	Report	Aribi 23', 46'; Haj Hassen 90+1'

Barbourfields Stadium, Bulawayo
Referee: Helder Martins de Carvalho (Angola)

28 December 2019
16:00 (17:00 UTC+1)

Étoile du Sahel (Tunisia)	0–1	(Sudan) Al-Hilal
	Report	El Tahir 59'

Stade Olympique de Radès, Tunis
Referee: Noureddine El Jaafari (Morocco)
28 December 2019
19:00 (21:00 UTC+2)

Al-Ahly (Egypt)	2–0	(Zimbabwe) FC Platinum
Soliman 8', 69' (pen.)	Report

Al Salam Stadium, Cairo
Referee: Georges Gatogato (Burundi)

11 January 2020
13:00 (15:00 UTC+2)

FC Platinum (Zimbabwe)	1–1	(Egypt) Al-Ahly
Ngala 19'	Report	M. Mohsen 52'

Barbourfields Stadium, Bulawayo
Referee: Jean-Jacques Ndala Ngambo (DR Congo)
11 January 2020
19:00 (21:00 UTC+2)

Al-Hilal (Sudan)	1–2	(Tunisia) Étoile du Sahel
Al-Shoala 30'	Report	Aldamazin 35' (o.g.); Msakni 71'

Al-Hilal Stadium, Omdurman
Referee: Mustapha Ghorbal (Algeria)

25 January 2020
13:00 (15:00 UTC+2)

FC Platinum (Zimbabwe)	0–1	(Sudan) Al-Hilal
	Report	Aldai 84'

Barbourfields Stadium, Bulawayo
Referee: Janny Sikazwe (Zambia)
26 January 2020 (Note: The Al-Ahly v Étoile du Sahel match, originally scheduled on 24 January 2020, was postponed for 48 hours following request from the Egyptian Football Association due to security concerns ahead of the anniversary of the Egyptian revolution of 2011.)
19:00 (21:00 UTC+2)

Al-Ahly (Egypt)	1–0	(Tunisia) Étoile du Sahel
Ajayi 32'	Report

Al Salam Stadium, Cairo
Referee: Victor Gomes (South Africa)

1 February 2020
19:00 (20:00 UTC+1)

Étoile du Sahel (Tunisia)	2–0	(Zimbabwe) FC Platinum
Aribi 48'; Baayou 72'	Report

Stade Olympique de Radès, Tunis
Referee: Ahmad Heeralall (Mauritius)
1 February 2020
19:00 (21:00 UTC+2)

Al-Hilal (Sudan)	1–1	(Egypt) Al-Ahly
Abdel Raouf 90+6'	Report	Magdy 48'

Al-Hilal Stadium, Omdurman
Referee: Rédouane Jiyed (Morocco)

=== Group C ===
Pos	Team	Pld	W	D	L	GF	GA	GD	Pts	Qualification	MSD	WAC	PET	USM
1	(South Africa) Mamelodi Sundowns	6	4	2	0	9	3	+6	14	Advance to knockout stage	—	1–0	3–0	2–1
2	(Morocco) Wydad AC	6	2	3	1	10	6	+4	9	Advance to knockout stage	0–0	—	4–1	3–1
3	(Angola) Petro de Luanda	6	0	4	2	8	14	−6	4		2–2	2–2	—	1–1
4	(Algeria) USM Alger	6	0	3	3	6	10	−4	3		0–1	1–1	2–2	—

Source: CAF
Rules for classification: Tiebreakers
30 November 2019
16:00 (17:00 UTC+1)

USM Alger (Algeria)	1–1	(Morocco) Wydad AC
Zouari 5'	Report	Aouk 89'

Mustapha Tchaker Stadium, Blida (Note: USM Alger played their home matches at Mustapha Tchaker Stadium, Blida, and at Stade 20 Août 1955, Algiers, instead of their regular home stadium Omar Hamadi Stadium, Algiers, which did not meet CAF requirements.)
Referee: Bernard Camille (Seychelles)
30 November 2019
19:00 (21:00 UTC+2)

Mamelodi Sundowns (South Africa)	3–0	(Angola) Petro de Luanda
Affonso 7'; Madisha 29'; Mkhulise 76'	Report

Loftus Versfeld Stadium, Pretoria
Referee: Gehad Grisha (Egypt)

7 December 2019
13:00 (14:00 UTC+1)

Petro de Luanda (Angola)	1–1	(Algeria) USM Alger
Toni 64'	Report	Benchaâ 54'

Estádio 11 de Novembro, Luanda
Referee: Bamlak Tessema Weyesa (Ethiopia)
7 December 2019
19:00 (20:00 UTC+1)

Wydad AC (Morocco)	0–0	(South Africa) Mamelodi Sundowns
	Report

Stade Mohammed V, Casablanca
Referee: Jean-Jacques Ndala Ngambo (DR Congo)

28 December 2019
16:00 (17:00 UTC+1)

USM Alger (Algeria)	0–1	(South Africa) Mamelodi Sundowns
	Report	Kekana 59'

Mustapha Tchaker Stadium, Blida
Referee: Beida Dahane (Mauritania)
28 December 2019
19:00 (20:00 UTC+1)

Wydad AC (Morocco)	4–1	(Angola) Petro de Luanda
El Kaabi 29', 79', 90+3' (pen.); Wilson 84' (o.g.)	Report	Toni 68'

Stade Mohammed V, Casablanca
Referee: Janny Sikazwe (Zambia)

11 January 2020
13:00 (15:00 UTC+2)

Mamelodi Sundowns (South Africa)	2–1	(Algeria) USM Alger
Morena 36'; Vilakazi 45+1'	Report	Mahious 44'

Loftus Versfeld Stadium, Pretoria
Referee: Mahmoud El Banna (Egypt)
11 January 2020
16:00 (17:00 UTC+1)

Petro de Luanda (Angola)	2–2	(Morocco) Wydad AC
Herenilson 21'; Dany 45+1'	Report	Kasengu 14'; Jabrane 58' (pen.)

Estádio 11 de Novembro, Luanda
Referee: Kalilou Traoré (Ivory Coast)

24 January 2020
19:00 (20:00 UTC+1)

Wydad AC (Morocco)	3–1	(Algeria) USM Alger
El Karti 7'; Aouk 24'; Kasengu 45+1'	Report	Meftah 79'

Stade Mohammed V, Casablanca
Referee: Eric Otogo-Castane (Gabon)
25 January 2020
13:00 (14:00 UTC+1)

Petro de Luanda (Angola)	2–2	(South Africa) Mamelodi Sundowns
Job 41' (pen.); Tuyisenge 71'	Report	Sirino 23' (pen.); Madisha 90+1'

Estádio 11 de Novembro, Luanda
Referee: Mahamadou Keita (Mali)

1 February 2020
13:00 (14:00 UTC+1)

USM Alger (Algeria)	2–2	(Angola) Petro de Luanda
Mahious 33'; Ardji 70'	Report	Picas 80'; Toni 81'

Stade 20 Août 1955, Algiers
Referee: Sadok Selmi (Tunisia)
1 February 2020
13:00 (15:00 UTC+2)

Mamelodi Sundowns (South Africa)	1–0	(Morocco) Wydad AC
Nascimento 45+1' (pen.)	Report

Lucas Masterpieces Moripe Stadium, Pretoria
Referee: Daouda Guèye (Senegal)

=== Group D ===
Pos	Team	Pld	W	D	L	GF	GA	GD	Pts	Qualification	EST	RCA	JSK	VIT
1	(Tunisia) Espérance de Tunis	6	3	2	1	7	3	+4	11 (Note: Head-to-head points: Espérance de Tunis 4, Raja Casablanca 1.)	Advance to knockout stage	—	2–2	1–0	0–0
2	(Morocco) Raja Casablanca	6	3	2	1	6	4	+2	11	Advance to knockout stage	0–2	—	2–0	1–0
3	(Algeria) JS Kabylie	6	2	1	3	3	7	−4	7		1–0	0–0	—	1–0
4	(Democratic Republic of the Congo) AS Vita Club	6	1	1	4	4	6	−2	4		0–2	0–1	4–1	—

Source: CAF
Rules for classification: Tiebreakers
Notes:
29 November 2019
16:00 (17:00 UTC+1)

JS Kabylie (Algeria)	1–0	(Democratic Republic of the Congo) AS Vita Club
Addadi 66'	Report

Stade du 1er Novembre 1954, Tizi Ouzou
Referee: Ahmad Heeralall (Mauritius)
30 November 2019
19:00 (20:00 UTC+1)

Raja Casablanca (Morocco)	0–2	(Tunisia) Espérance de Tunis
	Report	Badri 8'; Ouattara 15'

Stade Mohammed V, Casablanca
Referee: Victor Gomes (South Africa)

6 December 2019
16:00 (17:00 UTC+1)

AS Vita Club (Democratic Republic of the Congo)	0–1	(Morocco) Raja Casablanca
	Report	Rahimi 48'

Stade des Martyrs, Kinshasa
Referee: Janny Sikazwe (Zambia)
6 December 2019
19:00 (20:00 UTC+1)

Espérance de Tunis (Tunisia)	1–0	(Algeria) JS Kabylie
Badri 73' (pen.)	Report

Stade Olympique de Radès, Tunis
Referee: Maguette N'Diaye (Senegal)

27 December 2019
19:00 (20:00 UTC+1)

Espérance de Tunis (Tunisia)	0–0	(Democratic Republic of the Congo) AS Vita Club
	Report

Stade Olympique de Radès, Tunis
Referee: Eric Otogo-Castane (Gabon)
27 December 2019
19:00 (20:00 UTC+1)

Raja Casablanca (Morocco)	2–0	(Algeria) JS Kabylie
Malango 51'; Rahimi 54'	Report

Stade Mohammed V, Casablanca
Referee: Mohamed Maarouf (Egypt)

10 January 2020
16:00 (17:00 UTC+1)

JS Kabylie (Algeria)	0–0	(Morocco) Raja Casablanca
	Report

Stade du 1er Novembre 1954, Tizi Ouzou
Referee: Louis Hakizimana (Rwanda)
11 January 2020
16:00 (17:00 UTC+1)

AS Vita Club (Democratic Republic of the Congo)	0–2	(Tunisia) Espérance de Tunis
	Report	Coulibaly 21'; Elhouni 90+11'

Stade des Martyrs, Kinshasa
Referee: Pacifique Ndabihawenimana (Burundi)

25 January 2020
16:00 (17:00 UTC+1)

AS Vita Club (Democratic Republic of the Congo)	4–1	(Algeria) JS Kabylie
Shabani 24' (pen.); Bangala 55'; Luzolo 67'; Mayele 70'	Report	Hamroune 31'

Stade des Martyrs, Kinshasa
Referee: Bernard Camille (Seychelles)
25 January 2020
19:00 (20:00 UTC+1)

Espérance de Tunis (Tunisia)	2–2	(Morocco) Raja Casablanca
Benguit 32'; Ben Choug 81'	Report	Ngah 49'; Banoun 67'

Stade Olympique de Radès, Tunis
Referee: Bakary Gassama (Gambia)

1 February 2020
16:00 (17:00 UTC+1)

Raja Casablanca (Morocco)	1–0	(Democratic Republic of the Congo) AS Vita Club
Banoun 3'	Report

Stade Mohammed V, Casablanca
Referee: Joshua Bondo (Botswana)
1 February 2020
16:00 (17:00 UTC+1)

JS Kabylie (Algeria)	1–0	(Tunisia) Espérance de Tunis
Hamroune 56'	Report

Stade du 1er Novembre 1954, Tizi Ouzou
Referee: Amin Omar (Egypt)
