= Al Ahly SC Stadium =

Football stadium in Cairo, Egypt

Vodafone Stadium
- Al Ahly Stadium (CAF competitions)
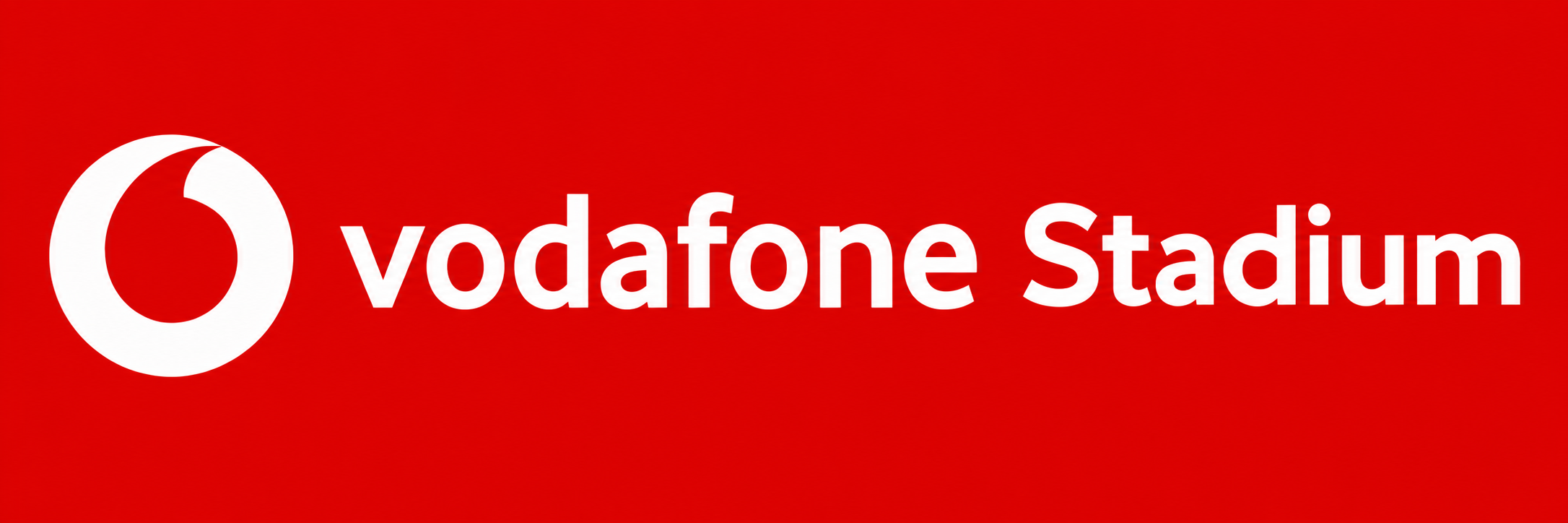
- Interactive map of Vodafone Stadium
- Location: Sheikh Zayed City, Greater Cairo, Egypt
- Coordinates: 30°05′08.93″N 30°58′11.18″E
- Owner: Al Ahly
- Operator: Palms Sports
- Capacity: 42,000
- Surface: Hybrid grass
- Field size: 105 by 68 metres (115 yd × 74 yd)

Construction
- Groundbreaking: 14 February 2025
- Cost: 145–150 million $ (approximate)
- Architect: Gensler
- Project manager: El Qalaa El Hamraa
- Main contractor: Hill International

Tenants
- Al Ahly SC; Egypt national football team (selected matches)

Website
- elqalaaelhamraa.com

Al Ahly Stadium (currently known as the Vodafone Stadium for sponsorship reasons) (or Al Ahly Stadium during CAF competitions) is an under-construction all-seater, multi-purpose stadium in Sheikh Zayed City, Giza Governorate, Egypt. With a planned capacity of 42,000 spectators, it will serve as the home stadium of Al Ahly and will also host selected matches of the Egypt national football team. Designed by Gensler, the stadium forms the centerpiece of Al Ahly’s wider sports city development.

== History ==
Plans for a dedicated stadium for Al Ahly had existed for decades, as the club had never owned a permanent home stadium despite being one of Africa’s most successful football clubs.

On 14 February 2025, Al Ahly officially unveiled the final design of the stadium during a ceremony held at the project site in Sheikh Zayed City, marking the groundbreaking of the development. The project was designed by the international architecture firm Gensler in collaboration with El Qalaa El Hamraa for Facilities Management.

The stadium is planned to become the club’s first permanent home ground and forms the centerpiece of Al Ahly Sports City, a wider mixed-use development that will also include a museum, a university, a hospital, and commercial and recreational facilities.

In July 2026, Al Ahly announced a landmark sponsorship agreement with Vodafone Egypt, granting the company the naming rights to the stadium, which will be commercially known as Vodafone Stadium.

== Transport connections ==
Al Ahly Stadium is located in Sheikh Zayed City, west of Cairo, along the Cairo–Alexandria desert road, providing direct road access from central Cairo, 6th of October City, and the surrounding Greater Cairo metropolitan area.

The stadium is also expected to benefit from the Cairo Monorail, which will serve Sheikh Zayed City and improve public transport connectivity to the stadium area. The monorail will connect the western suburbs of Greater Cairo with the Cairo Metro network, providing easier access for spectators travelling from across the metropolitan area.

In addition to public transport, the stadium masterplan includes on-site parking facilities and pedestrian plazas designed to accommodate large numbers of visitors on matchdays and during major events.

== See also ==
- List of football stadiums in Egypt
- Lists of stadiums
