= 2019–20 CAF Champions League =

2019–20 Total CAF Champions League
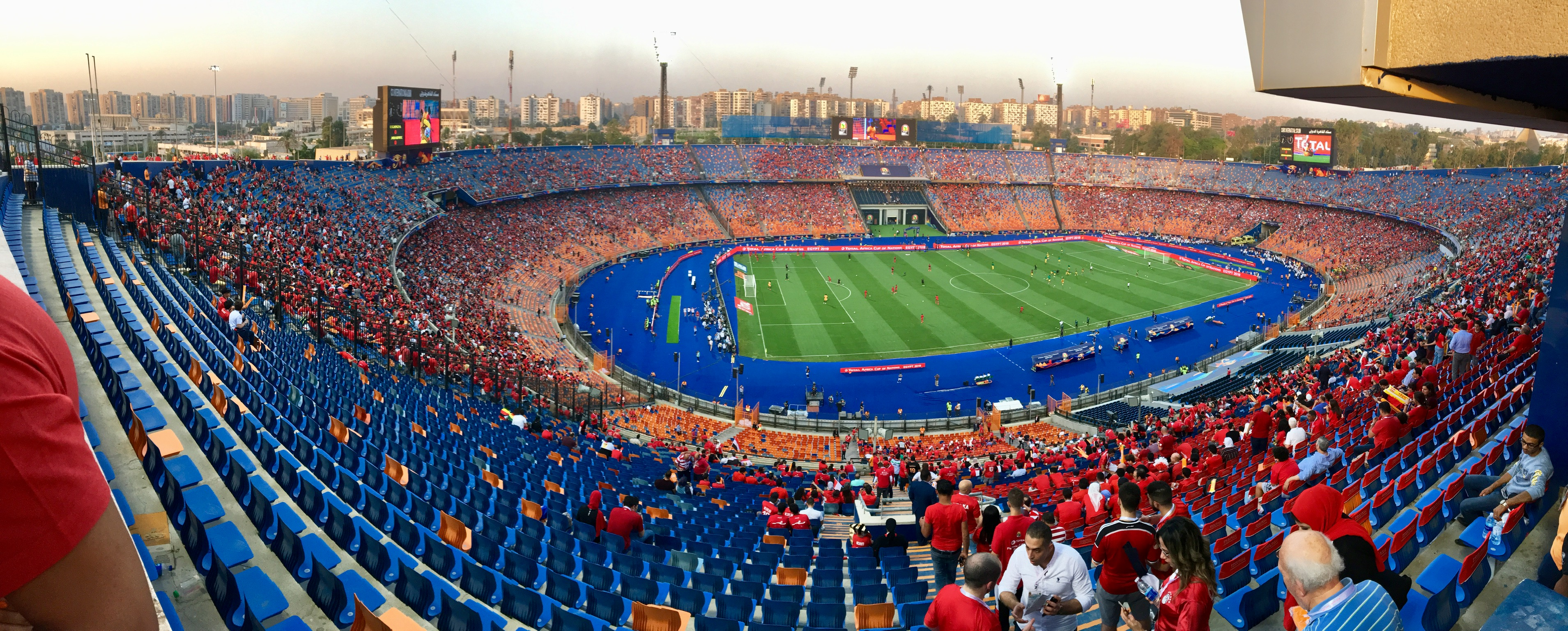
- Cairo International Stadium in Cairo, Egypt, hosted the final

Tournament details
- Dates: Qualifying: 9 August – 29 September 2019; Competition proper: 29 November 2019 – 27 November 2020
- Teams: Competition proper: 16; Total: 61 (from 49 associations)

Final positions
- Champions: (Egypt) Al-Ahly (9th title)
- Runners-up: (Egypt) Zamalek

Tournament statistics
- Matches played: 61
- Goals scored: 131 (2.15 per match)
- Top scorer(s): (Democratic Republic of the Congo) Jackson Muleka (7 goals)

The 2019–20 CAF Champions League (officially the 2019–20 Total CAF Champions League for sponsorship reasons) was the 56th edition of Africa's premier club football tournament organized by the Confederation of African Football (CAF), and the 24th edition under the current CAF Champions League title.

This season was to be the first to follow an August–to-May schedule, as per the decision of the CAF Executive Committee on 20 July 2017. However, the COVID-19 pandemic caused the semi-finals and final of the competition to be postponed until October and November 2020. Moreover, for the first time, the final was played as a single match at a venue pre-selected by CAF, and was originally to be played at the Japoma Stadium in Douala, Cameroon. However, during the suspension of the tournament due to the COVID-19 pandemic, Cameroon decided to withdraw from hosting, and instead, the final was played in Egypt, at the Cairo International Stadium in Cairo.

Ahly won a record-extending 9th title, defeating fellow Egyptian rivals Zamalek 2–1 in the final.

As winners of the 2019–20 CAF Champions League, Ahly qualified for the 2020 FIFA Club World Cup in Qatar, and earned the right to play against the winners of the 2019–20 CAF Confederation Cup in the 2020–21 CAF Super Cup.

This was the first time in the history of the CAF Champions League that the final was contested between two clubs from the same country.

== Association team allocation ==
All 56 CAF member associations may enter the CAF Champions League, with the 12 highest ranked associations according to their CAF 5-year ranking eligible to enter two teams in the competition. As a result, theoretically a maximum of 68 teams could enter the tournament – although this level has never been reached.

For the 2019–20 CAF Champions League, the CAF uses the 2015–2019 CAF 5-year ranking, which calculates points for each entrant association based on their clubs' performance over those 5 years in the CAF Champions League and CAF Confederation Cup. The criteria for points are the following:

	CAF Champions League	CAF Confederation Cup
Winners	6 points	5 points
Runners-up	5 points	4 points
Losing semi-finalists	4 points	3 points
Losing quarter-finalists (from 2017)	3 points	2 points
3rd place in groups	2 points	1 point
4th place in groups	1 point	0.5 point

The points are multiplied by a coefficient according to the year as follows:

- 2018–19 – 5
- 2018 – 4
- 2017 – 3
- 2016 – 2
- 2015 – 1

This was announced by the CAF on 4 June 2019, as using the previous scheme, it would be based on results from 2014 to 2018. The only change for the top 12 associations is that Tanzania is included while Ivory Coast is excluded.

== Teams ==
The following 61 teams from 49 associations entered the competition.

- Three teams (in **bold**) received a bye to the first round.
- The other 58 teams entered the preliminary round.

Associations are shown according to their 2015–2019 CAF 5-year ranking – those with a ranking score have their rank and score indicated.

Associations eligible to enter two teams (Ranked 1–12)
Association	Team	Qualifying method
Tunisia (1st – 154 pts)	**Espérance de Tunis**	Title holders (2018–19 CAF Champions League winners); 2018–19 Tunisian Ligue Professionnelle 1 champions
Tunisia (1st – 154 pts)	Étoile du Sahel	2018–19 Tunisian Ligue Professionnelle 1 runners-up
Morocco (2nd – 153 pts)	**Wydad AC**	2018–19 Botola champions
Morocco (2nd – 153 pts)	Raja Casablanca	2018–19 Botola runners-up
Egypt (3rd – 120.5 pts)	Al-Ahly	2018–19 Egyptian Premier League champions
Egypt (3rd – 120.5 pts)	Zamalek	2018–19 Egyptian Premier League runners-up
Algeria (4th – 92 pts)	USM Alger	2018–19 Algerian Ligue Professionnelle 1 champions
Algeria (4th – 92 pts)	JS Kabylie	2018–19 Algerian Ligue Professionnelle 1 runners-up
DR Congo (5th – 87 pts)	**TP Mazembe**	2018–19 Linafoot champions
DR Congo (5th – 87 pts)	AS Vita Club	2018–19 Linafoot runners-up
South Africa (6th – 76.5 pts)	Mamelodi Sundowns	2018–19 South African Premier Division champions
South Africa (6th – 76.5 pts)	Orlando Pirates	2018–19 South African Premier Division runners-up
Zambia (7th – 40.5 pts)	ZESCO United	2019 Zambian Super League champions
Zambia (7th – 40.5 pts)	Green Eagles	2019 Zambian Super League runners-up
Sudan (8th – 35 pts)	Al-Merrikh	2018–19 Sudan Premier League champions
Sudan (8th – 35 pts)	Al-Hilal	2018–19 Sudan Premier League runners-up
Nigeria (9th – 32.5 pts)	Enyimba	2019 Nigeria Professional Football League champions
Nigeria (9th – 32.5 pts)	Kano Pillars	2019 Nigeria Professional Football League runners-up
Guinea (10th – 30 pts)	Horoya	2018–19 Guinée Championnat National champions
Guinea (10th – 30 pts)	Hafia	2018–19 Guinée Championnat National runners-up
Angola (11th – 21.5 pts)	1º de Agosto	2018–19 Girabola champions
Angola (11th – 21.5 pts)	Petro de Luanda	2018–19 Girabola runners-up
Tanzania (12th – 18 pts)	Simba	2018–19 Tanzanian Premier League champions
Tanzania (12th – 18 pts)	Young Africans	2018–19 Tanzanian Premier League runners-up

Associations eligible to enter one team
Association	Team	Qualifying method
Ivory Coast (13th – 15 pts)	SO de l'Armée	2018–19 Côte d'Ivoire Ligue 1 champions
Kenya (14th – 14 pts)	Gor Mahia	2018–19 Kenyan Premier League champions
Mozambique (15th – 13 pts)	UD Songo	2018 Moçambola champions
Congo (16th – 11.5 pts)	AS Otôho	2018–19 Congo Ligue 1 champions
Uganda (17th – 11 pts)	KCCA	2018–19 Uganda Premier League champions
Libya (18th – 10 pts)	Al-Nasr	2017–18 Libyan Premier League champions
Ghana (19th – 9 pts)	Asante Kotoko	2019 GFA Normalization Committee Special Competition Tier 1 winners
Rwanda (T-20th – 8 pts)	Rayon Sports	2018–19 Rwanda Premier League champions
Zimbabwe (T-20th – 8 pts)	FC Platinum	2018 Zimbabwe Premier Soccer League champions
Eswatini (22nd – 7 pts)	Green Mamba	2018–19 Eswatini Premier League champions
Ethiopia (23rd – 6 pts)	Mekelle 70 Enderta	2018–19 Ethiopian Premier League champions
Botswana (T-24th – 4 pts)	Township Rollers	2018–19 Botswana Premier League champions
Togo (T-24th – 4 pts)	ASC Kara	2018–19 Togolese Championnat National champions
Cameroon (T-26th – 3 pts)	UMS de Loum	2019 Elite One champions
Mali (T-26th – 3 pts)	Stade Malien	2018 Malian Cup winners
Burkina Faso (28th – 2.5 pts)	Rahimo	2018–19 Burkinabé Premier League champions
Gabon (29th – 1.5 pts)	Cercle Mbéri Sportif	2019 Gabon Championnat National D1 champions
Benin	Buffles du Borgou	2018–19 Benin Premier League champions
Burundi	Aigle Noir	2018–19 Burundi Premier League champions
Central African Republic	AS Tempête Mocaf	2019 Central African Republic League champions
Chad	Elect-Sport	2019 Chad Premier League champions
Comoros	Fomboni	2019 Comoros Premier League champions
Equatorial Guinea	Cano Sport	2018–19 Equatoguinean Primera División champions
Gambia	Brikama United	2018–19 GFA League First Division champions
Lesotho	Matlama	2018–19 Lesotho Premier League champions
Liberia	LPRC Oilers	2019 Liberian First Division League champions
Madagascar	Fosa Juniors	2019 THB Champions League champions
Malawi	Big Bullets	2018 Malawi Premier Division champions
Mauritania	FC Nouadhibou	2018–19 Ligue 1 Mauritania champions
Mauritius	Pamplemousses	2018–19 Mauritian Premier League champions
Namibia	African Stars	2018–19 Namibia Premier League runners-up
Niger	AS SONIDEP	2018–19 Niger Premier League champions
Senegal	Génération Foot	2018–19 Senegal Premier League champions
Seychelles	Côte d'Or	2018 Seychelles First Division champions
Somalia	Dekedaha	2019 Somali First Division champions
South Sudan	Atlabara	2019 South Sudan Football Championship champions
Zanzibar	KMKM	2018–19 Zanzibar Premier League champions

Notes

1. Libya (LBY): For the second consecutive season, Libya were represented by Al-Nasr, the 2017–18 Libyan Premier League champions, as the 2018–19 Libyan Premier League was suspended and the Libyan Cup was not played in 2018–19.
2. Mali (MLI): For the second consecutive season, Mali were represented by Stade Malien, the 2018 Malian Cup winners, as the Malian Première Division and Malian Cup were not played in 2018–19.

Associations which did not enter a team

- Cape Verde
- Djibouti
- Eritrea
- Guinea-Bissau
- Réunion
- São Tomé and Príncipe
- Sierra Leone
Location of teams of the 2019–20 CAF Champions League.
Red: Preliminary round; Green: First Round;
Brown: Group A; Orange: Group B; Yellow: Group C; Blue: Group D.

== Schedule ==
The schedule of the competition was as follows.

On 24 November 2019, CAF made a change to all fixtures dates starting from the group stage matchday 4 to the final, due to rescheduling of the 2020 African Nations Championship from January/February to April. The quarter-finals draw date was also changed.

Following the quarter-finals, due to the COVID-19 pandemic in Africa, the semi-finals, originally scheduled for 1–2 May (first legs) and 8–9 May (second legs), were postponed indefinitely on 11 April 2020, and the final, originally scheduled for 29 May, was also postponed on 18 April 2020. On 30 June 2020, the CAF Executive Committee proposed that the competition would resume with a Final Four format played as single matches in a host country to be decided. However, these plans were later halted after the Cameroonian Football Federation withdrew from hosting the Final Four, and the CAF decided against hosting it in either Egypt or Morocco in the principle of fairness. On 3 August 2020, the CAF announced that the competition would resume in its original format with the semi-finals played on 25–26 September (first legs) and 2–3 October (second legs), and the final played on 16 or 17 October. On 10 September 2020, the CAF announced that at the request of the Royal Moroccan Football Federation, the semi-finals were rescheduled to 17–18 October (first legs) and 23–24 October (second legs), and the final to 6 November. On 22 October 2020, the CAF announced that the semi-final second leg between Zamalek and Raja Casablanca, originally scheduled to be played on 24 October, was postponed to 1 November, due to Raja Casablanca being required by Moroccan authorities to self-isolate until 27 October after eight players testing positive for the COVID-19 virus, with the total number of cases increasing to fourteen the following day. On 30 October 2020, the CAF announced that this match was further postponed to 4 November, the final postponed to 27 November.

Phase	Round	Draw date	First leg	Second leg
Qualifying	Preliminary round	21 July 2019	9–11 August 2019	23–25 August 2019
Qualifying	First round	21 July 2019	13–15 September 2019	27–29 September 2019
Group stage	Matchday 1	9 October 2019	29–30 November 2019	
Group stage	Matchday 2	9 October 2019	6–7 December 2019	
Group stage	Matchday 3	9 October 2019	27–28 December 2019	
Group stage	Matchday 4	9 October 2019	10–11 January 2020	
Group stage	Matchday 5	9 October 2019	24–25 January 2020	
Group stage	Matchday 6	9 October 2019	31 January – 1 February 2020	
Knockout stage	Quarter-finals	5 February 2020	28–29 February 2020	6–7 March 2020
Knockout stage	Semi-finals	5 February 2020	17–18 October 2020	23 October & 4 November 2020
Knockout stage	Final	5 February 2020	27 November 2020	

== Qualifying rounds ==
The draw for the qualifying rounds was held on 21 July 2019 at the CAF headquarters in Cairo, Egypt. In the qualifying rounds, each tie was played on a home-and-away two-legged basis. If the aggregate score was tied after the second leg, the away goals rule was applied, and if still tied, extra time was not played, and the penalty shoot-out was used to determine the winner (Regulations III. 13 & 14).

=== Preliminary round ===
Team 1	Agg.	Team 2	1st leg	2nd leg
Brikama United (The Gambia)	3–7	(Morocco) Raja Casablanca	3–3	0–4
AS Tempête Mocaf (Central African Republic)	2–3	(Libya) Al-Nasr	1–0	1–3
JS Kabylie (Algeria)	3–3 (a)	(Sudan) Al-Merrikh	1–0	2–3
Stade Malien (Mali)	1–2	(Guinea) Horoya	1–1	0–1
Buffles du Borgou (Benin)	1–2	(Togo) ASC Kara	1–1	0–1
UMS de Loum (Cameroon)	0–1	(Democratic Republic of the Congo) AS Vita Club	0–0	0–1
Rayon Sports (Rwanda)	1–1 (a)	(Sudan) Al-Hilal	1–1	0–0
Rahimo (Burkina Faso)	1–5	(Nigeria) Enyimba	1–0	0–5
AS SONIDEP (Niger)	2–5	(Algeria) USM Alger	1–2	1–3
Aigle Noir (Burundi)	1–5	(Kenya) Gor Mahia	0–0	1–5
Atlabara (South Sudan)	0–13	(Egypt) Al-Ahly	0–4	0–9
Cano Sport (Equatorial Guinea)	3–2	(Ethiopia) Mekelle 70 Enderta	2–1	1–1
Dekedaha (Somalia)	0–13	(Egypt) Zamalek	0–7	0–6
LPRC Oilers (Liberia)	1–3	(Senegal) Génération Foot	1–0	0–3
Hafia (Guinea)	3–8	(Tunisia) Étoile du Sahel	2–1	1–7
Kano Pillars (Nigeria)	3–4	(Ghana) Asante Kotoko	3–2	0–2
African Stars (Namibia)	3–4	(Uganda) KCCA	3–2	0–2
Matlama (Lesotho)	0–4	(Angola) Petro de Luanda	0–2	0–2
Fomboni (Comoros)	3–3 (a)	(Seychelles) Côte d'Or	2–2	1–1
AS Otôho (Republic of the Congo)	2–5	(South Africa) Mamelodi Sundowns	2–1	0–4
SO de l'Armée (Ivory Coast)	0–1	(Mauritania) FC Nouadhibou	0–0	0–1
Cercle Mbéri Sportif (Gabon)	0–2	(Chad) Elect-Sport	0–0	0–2
Green Mamba (Eswatini)	0–3	(Zambia) ZESCO United	0–2	0–1
Young Africans (Tanzania)	2–1	(Botswana) Township Rollers	1–1	1–0
Big Bullets (Malawi)	2–3	(Zimbabwe) FC Platinum	0–0	2–3
UD Songo (Mozambique)	1–1 (a)	(Tanzania) Simba	0–0	1–1
KMKM (Zanzibar)	0–4	(Angola) 1º de Agosto	0–2	0–2
Green Eagles (Zambia)	2–1	(South Africa) Orlando Pirates	1–0	1–1
Fosa Juniors (Madagascar)	2–1	(Mauritius) Pamplemousses	1–0	1–1

=== First round ===
The 16 winners of the first round advanced to the group stage, while the 16 losers of the first round entered the Confederation Cup play-off round.

Team 1	Agg.	Team 2	1st leg	2nd leg
Al-Nasr (Libya)	2–4	(Morocco) Raja Casablanca	1–3	1–1
JS Kabylie (Algeria)	2–2 (5–3 p)	(Guinea) Horoya	2–0	0–2
ASC Kara (Togo)	0–1	(Democratic Republic of the Congo) AS Vita Club	0–0	0–1
Enyimba (Nigeria)	0–1	(Sudan) Al-Hilal	0–0	0–1
USM Alger (Algeria)	6–1	(Kenya) Gor Mahia	4–1	2–0
Cano Sport (Equatorial Guinea)	0–6	(Egypt) Al-Ahly	0–2	0–4
Génération Foot (Senegal)	2–2 (a)	(Egypt) Zamalek	2–1	0–1
Asante Kotoko (Ghana)	2–3	(Tunisia) Étoile du Sahel	2–0	0–3
Petro de Luanda (Angola)	1–1 (a)	(Uganda) KCCA	0–0	1–1
Côte d'Or (Seychelles)	1–16	(South Africa) Mamelodi Sundowns	0–5	1–11
FC Nouadhibou (Mauritania)	1–6	(Morocco) Wydad AC	0–2	1–4
Elect-Sport (Chad)	2–3	(Tunisia) Espérance de Tunis	1–1	1–2
Young Africans (Tanzania)	2–3	(Zambia) ZESCO United	1–1	1–2
FC Platinum (Zimbabwe)	5–2	(Mozambique) UD Songo	1–0	4–2
Green Eagles (Zambia)	2–2 (a)	(Angola) 1º de Agosto	1–2	1–0
Fosa Juniors (Madagascar)	1–3	(Democratic Republic of the Congo) TP Mazembe	0–0	1–3

== Group stage ==
The draw for the group stage was held on 9 October 2019, 20:00 CAT (UTC+2), at the Hilton Pyramids Golf in Cairo, Egypt. The 16 teams, all winners of the first round of qualifying, were drawn into four groups of four.

The teams were seeded by their performances in the CAF competitions for the previous five seasons (CAF 5-year ranking points shown in parentheses). Each group contained one team from each of Pot 1, Pot 2, Pot 3, and Pot 4, and each team was drawn into one of the positions in their group.

Pot	Pot 1	Pot 2	Pot 3	Pot 4
Teams	(Tunisia) Espérance de Tunis (63.5 pts); (Democratic Republic of the Congo) TP Mazembe (63 pts); (Morocco) Wydad AC (63 pts); (Egypt) Al-Ahly (57 pts)	(Tunisia) Étoile du Sahel (50 pts); (South Africa) Mamelodi Sundowns (49 pts); (Egypt) Zamalek (44 pts); (Morocco) Raja Casablanca (25 pts)	(Algeria) USM Alger (25 pts); (Zambia) ZESCO United (24.5 pts); (Democratic Republic of the Congo) AS Vita Club (24 pts); (Sudan) Al-Hilal (19 pts)	(Angola) 1º de Agosto (16 pts); (Zimbabwe) FC Platinum (5 pts); (Angola) Petro de Luanda (2.5 pts); (Algeria) JS Kabylie

In each group, teams play against each other home-and-away in a round-robin format. The group winners and runners-up advance to the quarter-finals of the knockout stage.

Tiebreakers
Teams are ranked according to points (3 points for a win, 1 point for a draw, 0 points for a loss). If tied on points, tiebreakers are applied in the following order (Regulations III. 20 & 21):
1. Points in head-to-head matches among tied teams;
2. Goal difference in head-to-head matches among tied teams;
3. Goals scored in head-to-head matches among tied teams;
4. Away goals scored in head-to-head matches among tied teams;
5. If more than two teams are tied, and after applying all head-to-head criteria above, a subset of teams are still tied, all head-to-head criteria above are reapplied exclusively to this subset of teams;
6. Goal difference in all group matches;
7. Goals scored in all group matches;
8. Away goals scored in all group matches;
9. Drawing of lots.

=== Group A ===
Pos	Team	Pld	W	D	L	GF	GA	GD	Pts	Qualification	TPM	ZAM	AGO	ZES
1	(Democratic Republic of the Congo) TP Mazembe	6	4	2	0	11	4	+7	14	Advance to knockout stage	—	3–0	2–1	3–1
2	(Egypt) Zamalek	6	2	3	1	5	4	+1	9	Advance to knockout stage	0–0	—	2–0	2–0
3	(Angola) 1º de Agosto	6	0	4	2	4	7	−3	4		1–1	0–0	—	1–1
4	(Zambia) ZESCO United	6	0	3	3	5	10	−5	3		1–2	1–1	1–1	—

Source: CAF

=== Group B ===
Pos	Team	Pld	W	D	L	GF	GA	GD	Pts	Qualification	ESS	AHL	HIL	PLA
1	(Tunisia) Étoile du Sahel	6	4	0	2	8	3	+5	12	Advance to knockout stage	—	1–0	0–1	2–0
2	(Egypt) Al-Ahly	6	3	2	1	7	4	+3	11	Advance to knockout stage	1–0	—	2–1	2–0
3	(Sudan) Al-Hilal	6	3	1	2	7	6	+1	10		1–2	1–1	—	2–1
4	(Zimbabwe) FC Platinum	6	0	1	5	2	11	−9	1		0–3	1–1	0–1	—

Source: CAF

=== Group C ===
Pos	Team	Pld	W	D	L	GF	GA	GD	Pts	Qualification	MSD	WAC	PET	USM
1	(South Africa) Mamelodi Sundowns	6	4	2	0	9	3	+6	14	Advance to knockout stage	—	1–0	3–0	2–1
2	(Morocco) Wydad AC	6	2	3	1	10	6	+4	9	Advance to knockout stage	0–0	—	4–1	3–1
3	(Angola) Petro de Luanda	6	0	4	2	8	14	−6	4		2–2	2–2	—	1–1
4	(Algeria) USM Alger	6	0	3	3	6	10	−4	3		0–1	1–1	2–2	—

Source: CAF

=== Group D ===
Pos	Team	Pld	W	D	L	GF	GA	GD	Pts	Qualification	EST	RCA	JSK	VIT
1	(Tunisia) Espérance de Tunis	6	3	2	1	7	3	+4	11 (Note: Head-to-head points: Espérance de Tunis 4, Raja Casablanca 1.)	Advance to knockout stage	—	2–2	1–0	0–0
2	(Morocco) Raja Casablanca	6	3	2	1	6	4	+2	11	Advance to knockout stage	0–2	—	2–0	1–0
3	(Algeria) JS Kabylie	6	2	1	3	3	7	−4	7		1–0	0–0	—	1–0
4	(Democratic Republic of the Congo) AS Vita Club	6	1	1	4	4	6	−2	4		0–2	0–1	4–1	—

Source: CAF

== Knockout stage ==
In the knockout stage, the quarter-finals and semi-finals were played over two legs, with each team playing one leg at home. The team that scored more goals on aggregate over the two legs advanced to the next round. If the aggregate score was level, the away goals rule is applied, i.e. the team that scored more goals away from home over the two legs advanced. If away goals were also equal, then extra time was not played and the winners were decided by a penalty shoot-out.

In the final, which was played as a single match, if the score was level at the end of normal time, extra time was also not to be played and the winners would be decided by a penalty shoot-out.

The mechanism of the draws for each round was as follows:

- In the draw for the quarter-finals, the four group winners were seeded, and the four group runners-up were unseeded. The seeded teams were drawn against the unseeded teams, with the seeded teams hosting the second leg. Teams from the same group cannot be drawn against each other, while teams from the same association could be drawn against each other.
- In the draws for semi-finals, there were no seedings, and teams from the same group or the same association could be drawn against each other. As the draws for the quarter-finals and semi-finals were held together before the quarter-finals were played, the identity of the quarter-final winners was not known at the time of the semi-final draw.

=== Bracket ===
The bracket was decided after the draw for the knockout stage (quarter-finals and semi-finals), which was held on 5 February 2020, 20:00 CAT (UTC+2), at the Hilton Pyramids Golf in Cairo, Egypt.

Quarter-finals
(Morocco) Raja Casablanca	2	0	2
(Democratic Republic of the Congo) TP Mazembe	0	1	1
(Egypt) Zamalek	3	0	3
(Tunisia) Espérance de Tunis	1	1	2
(Morocco) Wydad AC	2	0	2
(Tunisia) Étoile du Sahel	0	1	1
(Egypt) Al-Ahly	2	1	3
(South Africa) Mamelodi Sundowns	0	1	1

Semi-finals
(Morocco) Raja Casablanca	0	1	1
(Egypt) Zamalek	1	3	4
(Morocco) Wydad AC	0	1	1
(Egypt) Al-Ahly	2	3	5

Final
(Egypt) Zamalek	1
(Egypt) Al-Ahly	2

=== Quarter-finals ===
Team 1	Agg.	Team 2	1st leg	2nd leg
Al-Ahly (Egypt)	3–1	(South Africa) Mamelodi Sundowns	2–0	1–1
Raja Casablanca (Morocco)	2–1	(Democratic Republic of the Congo) TP Mazembe	2–0	0–1
Zamalek (Egypt)	3–2	(Tunisia) Espérance de Tunis	3–1	0–1
Wydad AC (Morocco)	2–1	(Tunisia) Étoile du Sahel	2–0	0–1

=== Semi-finals ===
Due to the COVID-19 pandemic in Africa, all semi-final matches, originally scheduled for 1–2 May (first legs) and 8–9 May 2020 (second legs), were postponed. The matches were later rescheduled for 17–18 October (first legs) and 23 October and 4 November 2020 (second legs).

Team 1	Agg.	Team 2	1st leg	2nd leg
Raja Casablanca (Morocco)	1–4	(Egypt) Zamalek	0–1	1–3
Wydad AC (Morocco)	1–5	(Egypt) Al-Ahly	0–2	1–3

=== Final ===
Due to the COVID-19 pandemic in Africa, the final, originally scheduled for 29 May 2020, 20:00 WAT, at the Japoma Stadium, Douala, Cameroon, was postponed until further notice. In July, the Cameroonian Football Federation announced that they had withdrawn from hosting the final. The CAF decided that the final would be played in Egypt if both semi-finalists from Egypt, Al-Ahly and Zamalek, reached the final, or in Morocco if both semi-finalists from Morocco, Raja Casablanca and Wydad Casablanca, reached the final. If one team from Egypt and one team from Morocco reached the final, it was initially decided that the final would be played in a neutral country, but it was later decided that the final would then be played in either Egypt or Morocco, to be decided by a draw, which was held on 16 October 2020 in Casablanca, Morocco prior to the semi-final first legs, and the country drawn was Egypt.

Since both finalists were from Egypt, the match was played in Egypt, at the Cairo International Stadium, Cairo on 27 November 2020.

27 November 2020
19:00 (21:00 UTC+2)

Zamalek (Egypt)	1–2	(Egypt) Al Ahly
Shikabala 31'	Report	El Solia 5'; Afsha 86'

Cairo International Stadium, Cairo
Attendance: 0 (Note: The match was played behind closed doors due to the COVID-19 pandemic in Africa.)
Referee: Mustapha Ghorbal (Algeria)

== Top goalscorers ==
Team eliminated / inactive for this round.

Rank	Player	Team	MD1	MD2	MD3	MD4	MD5	MD6	QF1	QF2	SF1	SF2	F	Total
1	(Democratic Republic of the Congo) Jackson Muleka	(Democratic Republic of the Congo) TP Mazembe	2	2		1		2						7
2	(Morocco) Achraf Bencharki	(Egypt) Zamalek		2		1			1		1			5
3	(Algeria) Karim Aribi	(Tunisia) Étoile du Sahel		2				1		1				4
3	(Egypt) Mostafa Mohamed	(Egypt) Zamalek			1	1						2		4
5	(Morocco) Badr Banoun	(Morocco) Raja Casablanca					1	1	1					3
5	(Sudan) Mohamed Eldai	(Sudan) Al-Hilal	2				1							3
5	(Morocco) Ayoub El Kaabi	(Morocco) Wydad AC			3									3
5	(Zambia) Winston Kalengo	(Zambia) ZESCO United		1			1	1						3
5	(Tunisia) Ali Maâloul	(Egypt) Al-Ahly							2		1			3
5	(Angola) Mabululu	(Angola) 1º de Agosto	1		1	1								3
5	(Egypt) Mohamed Magdy	(Egypt) Al-Ahly						1			1		1	3
5	(Democratic Republic of the Congo) Ben Malango	(Morocco) Raja Casablanca			1				1			1		3
5	(Brazil) Toni	(Angola) Petro de Luanda		1	1			1						3

== See also ==
- 2019–20 CAF Confederation Cup
- 2020–21 CAF Super Cup
