= Mahmoud Wahid =

Egyptian footballer (born 1994)

Personal information
- Full name: Mahmoud Wahid El Sayed Mohamed
- Date of birth: 19 June 1994 (age 32)
- Place of birth: Ismailia, Egypt
- Height: 1.70 m (5 ft 7 in)
- Position: Left-back

Team information
- Current team: Smouha SC
- Number: 14

Youth career
- Ismaily

Senior career*
Years	Team	Apps	(Gls)
2011–2012	Ismaily	6	(0)
2012–2015	ENPPI	0	(0)
2013–2014	→ Telephonat Beni Suef (loan)	12	(0)
2015–2019	Misr Lel Makkasa	77	(5)
2019–	Al Ahly	22	(0)
2022–23	→ Tala'ea El Gaish (loan)	4	(0)
2022-	Smouha SC	20	(0)

International career
2010–2011	Egypt U-17	4	(0)
2013	Egypt U-20	3	(0)
2016	Egypt U-23	0	(0)
2019–	Egypt	1	(0)
- * Club domestic league appearances and goals as of 14 October 2021

Mahmoud Wahid El Sayed Mohamed (Arabic: محمود وحيد السيد محمد; born 19 June 1994), is an Egyptian footballer who plays for Egyptian Premier League side Tala'ea El Gaish on loan from Al Ahly as a left-back.

== Honours and achievements ==
=== Club ===
Al Ahly

- Egyptian Premier League: 2018–19, 2019-20
- Egypt Cup: 2019–20, 2021–22
- Egyptian Super Cup: 2018
- CAF Champions League: 2019-20, 2020-21
- FIFA Club World Cup: Third-Place 2020, Third-Place 2021
