= Mustapha Ghorbal =

Algerian association football referee

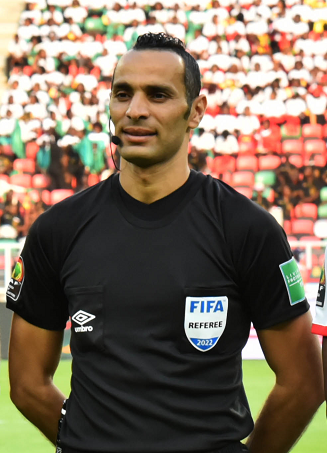
- Ghorbal at the 2021 Africa Cup of Nations
- Born: 19 August 1985 (age 41); Oran, Algeria

Domestic
Years	League	Role
2011–	Algerian Ligue 1	Referee

International
Years	League	Role
2014–	FIFA listed	Referee

Mustapha Ghorbal (Arabic: مصطفى غربال; born 19 August 1985) is an Algerian association football referee. He has been a full international referee for FIFA since 2014.

== Career ==
Mustapha Ghorbal made his debut in the Algerian first division in 2011 and has been an international referee for the FIFA since 2014.

== Statistics ==
=== Games and cards in Ligue Professionnelle 1 ===
Season	Games	Total (yellow card)	(yellow card) per game	Total (red card)	(red card) per game
2010–11	2	4	2	0	0
2011–12	13	41	3.15	1	0.07
2012–13	16	43	2.68	2	0.12
2013–14	12	37	3.08	1	0.08
2014–15	12	49	4.08	2	0.16
2015–16	10	45	4.5	0	0
2016–17	13	49	3.76	2	0.15
2017–18	17	91	5.35	4	0.23
2018–19	12	44	3.66	3	0.25
2019–20	10	41	4.1	5	0.5
2020–21	12	60	5.0	4	0.33
2021–22	6	25	5.0	1	0.33
2022–23	9	38	5.0	2	0.33
2023–24					
TOTAL	144	506	3.51	27	0.19

== Record ==
=== Major national team competition ===
2019 Africa Cup of Nations – Egypt
Date	Match	Venue	Location	Round	Result	Yellow cards	Red cards	Ref
24 June 2019	Ivory Coast – South Africa	Al Salam Stadium	Cairo	Group stage	1–0	4	0	
30 June 2019	Zimbabwe – DR Congo	30 June Stadium	Cairo	Group stage	0–4	4	0	
5 July 2019	Uganda – Senegal	Cairo International Stadium	Cairo	Round of 16	0–1	5	0	
10 July 2019	Senegal – Benin	30 June Stadium	Cairo	Quarter-final	1–0	3	1	
2021 FIFA Arab Cup – Qatar
Date	Match	Venue	Location	Round	Result	Yellow cards	Red cards	Ref
25 June 2021	Bahrain – Kuwait	Khalifa International Stadium	Al Rayyan	Qualification stage	2–0	4	0	
2021 Africa Cup of Nations – Cameroon
Date	Match	Venue	Location	Round	Result	Yellow cards	Red cards	Ref
9 January 2022	Cameroon – Burkina Faso	Olembe Stadium	Yaoundé	Group stage, opening match	2–1	3	0	
12 January 2022	Mauritania – Gambia	Limbe Stadium	Limbé	Group stage	0–1	5	0	
2022 FIFA World Cup qualification (CAF) – Senegal
Date	Match	Venue	Location	Round	Result	Yellow cards	Red cards	Ref
29 March 2022	Senegal – Egypt	Diamniadio Olympic Stadium	Dakar	Third stage, 2nd leg final	1–0 (a.e.t.)	8	0	
2022 FIFA World Cup – Qatar
Date	Match	Venue	Location	Round	Result	Yellow cards	Red cards	Ref
25 November 2022	Netherlands – Ecuador	Khalifa International Stadium	Al Rayyan	Group stage	1–1	1	0	
30 November 2022	Australia – Denmark	Al Janoub Stadium	Al Wakrah	Group stage	1–0	3	0	
5 December 2022	Japan – Croatia	Al Janoub Stadium	Al Wakrah	Round of 16	1–1 (1–3 p)	As fourth official		
9 December 2022	Croatia – Brazil	Education City Stadium	Al Rayyan	Quarter-final	1–1 (4–2 p)	As fourth official		
2023 Africa Cup of Nations – Ivory Coast
Date	Match	Venue	Location	Round	Result	Yellow cards	Red cards	Ref
14 January 2024	Ghana – Cape Verde	Felix Houphouet Boigny Stadium	Abidjan	Group stage	1–2	VAR referee		
18 January 2024	Ivory Coast – Nigeria	Alassane Ouattara Stadium	Abidjan	Group stage	0–1	1	0	
23 January 2024	Gambia – Cameroon	Stade de la Paix	Bouaké	Group stage	2–3	VAR referee		
2 February 2024	DR Congo – Guinea	Alassane Ouattara Stadium	Abidjan	Quarter-final	3–1	3	0	
2025 Africa Cup of Nations – Morocco
Date	Match	Venue	Location	Round	Result	Yellow cards	Red cards	Ref
28 December 2025	Ivory Coast – Cameroon	Marrakesh Stadium	Marrakesh	Group stage	1–1	3	0	
10 January 2026	Egypt – Ivory Coast	Adrar Stadium	Agadir	Quarter-final	3–2	2	0	
2026 FIFA World Cup – Canada/Mexico/United States
Date	Match	Venue	Location	Round	Result	Yellow cards	Red cards	Ref
13 June 2026	Haiti – Scotland	Gillette Stadium	Foxborough	Group stage	0–1	4	0	
25 June 2026	Turkey – United States	SoFi Stadium	Inglewood	Group stage	3–2	1	0	
30 June 2026	Mexico – Ecuador	Estadio Azteca	Mexico City	Round of 32	2–0	As fourth official		

=== Major club competition ===
2019 FIFA Club World Cup – Qatar
Date	Match	Venue	Location	Round	Result	Yellow cards	Red cards	Ref
24 June 2019	(Qatar) Al-Sadd – (New Caledonia) Hienghène Sport	Jassim bin Hamad Stadium	Al Rayyan	First round	3–1 (a.e.t.)	2	0	
2020 CAF Champions League final – Egypt
Date	Match	Venue	Location	Round	Result	Yellow cards	Red cards	Ref
27 November 2020	(Egypt) Zamalek – (Egypt) Al Ahly	Cairo International Stadium	Cairo	Final	1–2	5	2	
18 May 2024	(Egypt) ES Tunis – (Egypt) Al Ahly	Hammadi Agrebi Stadium	Radès, Tunis	Final	0–0	4	0	
2021 FIFA Club World Cup – United Arab Emirates
Date	Match	Venue	Location	Round	Result	Yellow cards	Red cards	Ref
3 February 2022	(United Arab Emirates) Al-Jazira – (French Polynesia) AS Pirae	Mohammed bin Zayed Stadium	Abu Dhabi	First round	4–1	3	0	
9 February 2022	(Mexico) Monterrey – (United Arab Emirates) Al-Jazira	Al Nahyan Stadium	Abu Dhabi	Fifth place	3–1	5	0	
12 February 2022	(England) Chelsea – (Brazil) Palmeiras	Mohammed bin Zayed Stadium	Abu Dhabi	Final	2–1 (a.e.t.)	Fourth official		
2022 CAF Super Cup – Morocco
Date	Match	Venue	Location	Round	Result	Yellow cards	Red cards	Ref
10 September 2022	(Morocco) Wydad AC – (Morocco) RS Berkane	Prince Moulay Abdellah Stadium	Rabat	Final	0–2	4	0	
2025 FIFA Club World Cup – United States
Date	Match	Venue	Location	Round	Result	Yellow cards	Red cards	Ref
18 June 2025	(Mexico) Pachuca – (Austria) Red Bull Salzburg	TQL Stadium	Cincinnati	Group stage	1–2	1	0	
22 June 2025	(England) Manchester City – (United Arab Emirates) Al Ain	Mercedes-Benz Stadium	Atlanta	Group stage	6–0	3	0	
29 June 2025	(France) Paris SG – (United States) Inter Miami	Mercedes-Benz Stadium	Atlanta	Round of 16	4–0	Fourth official		
9 July 2025	(France) Paris SG – (Spain) Real Madrid	MetLife Stadium	East Rutherford	Semi-final	4–0	Fourth official		

=== Other competitions ===
2015 African U-17 Championship – Niger
Date	Match	Venue	Location	Round	Result	Yellow cards	Red cards	Ref
16 February 2015	Mali – Cameroon	Stade Municipal	Niamey	Group stage	3–1	0	0	
21 February 2015	Nigeria – Zambia	Stade Municipal	Niamey	Group stage	3–1	5	0	
26 February 2015	Mali – Guinea	Stade Général Seyni Kountché	Niamey	Semi-final	2–1	2	0	
2017 U-17 Africa Cup of Nations – Gabon
Date	Match	Venue	Location	Round	Result	Yellow cards	Red cards	Ref
20 May 2017	Gabon – Cameroon	Stade de Port-Gentil	Port-Gentil	Group stage	0–1	0	0	
24 May 2017	Ghana – Niger	Stade de Port-Gentil	Port-Gentil	Semi-final	0–0 (6–5 p)	1	0	
2018 African Nations Championship – Morocco
Date	Match	Venue	Location	Round	Result	Yellow cards	Red cards	Ref
19 January 2018	Libya – Nigeria	Stade Ibn Batouta	Tangier	Group stage	0–1	4	0	
24 January 2018	Congo – Angola	Stade Adrar	Agadir	Group stage	0–0	4	0	
2019 FIFA U-20 World Cup – Poland
Date	Match	Venue	Location	Round	Result	Yellow cards	Red cards	Ref
23 May 2019	Poland – Colombia	Łódź Stadium	Łódź	Group stage	0–2	2	0	
29 May 2019	Italy – Japan	Bydgoszcz Stadium	Bydgoszcz	Group stage	0–0	2	0	
7 June 2019	Colombia – Ukraine	Łódź Stadium	Łódź	Quarter-final	0–1	7	1	
