= Janny Sikazwe =

Zambian football referee (born 1979)

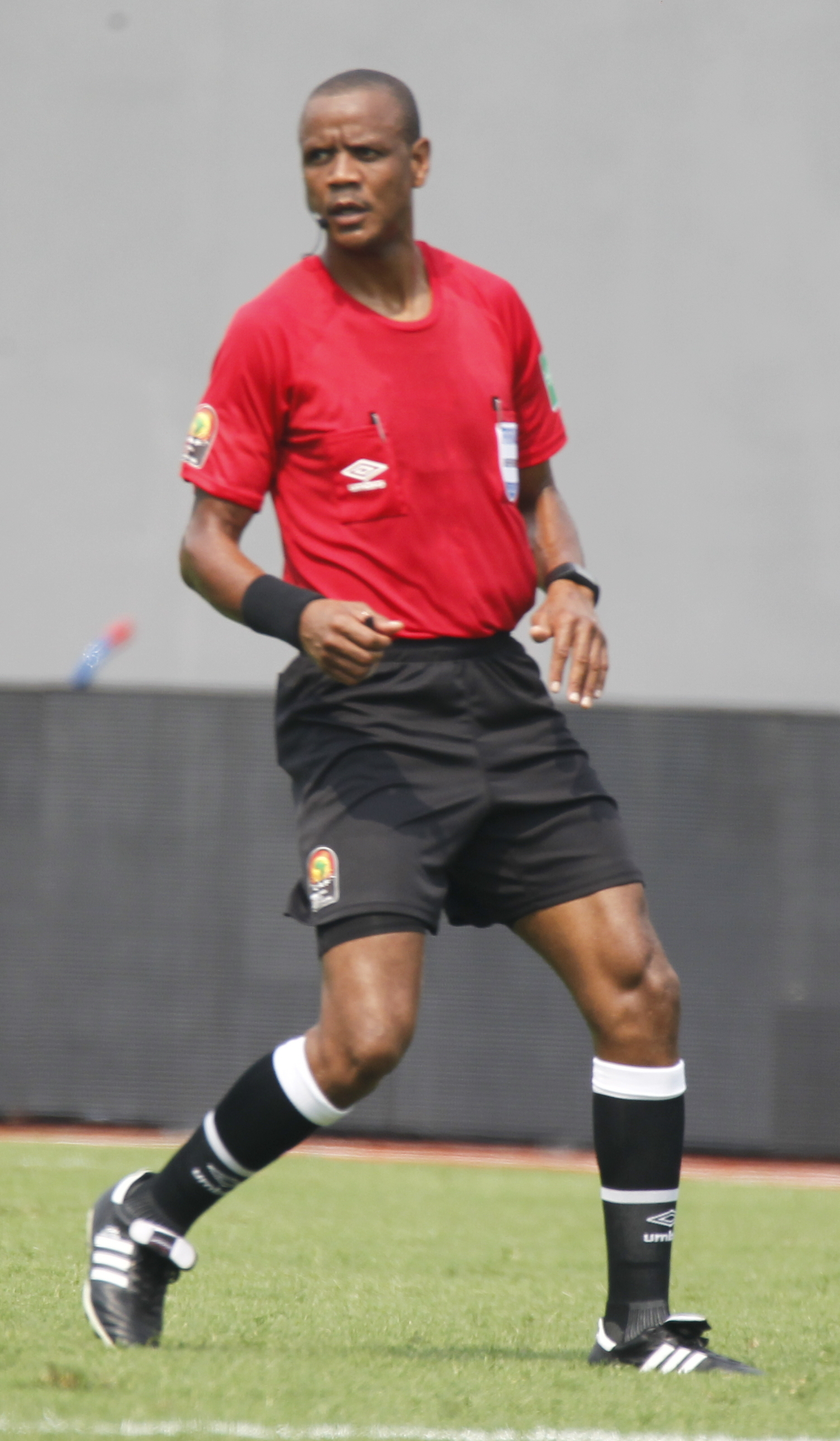
- Sikazwe refereeing in 2022
- Full name: Janny Sikazwe
- Born: 26 May 1979 (age 47); Kapiri Mposhi, Zambia
- Other occupation: Teacher

International
Years	League	Role
2007–2022	FIFA listed	Referee

Janny Sikazwe (born 29 May 1979) is a Zambian former international football referee. He came to prominence in 2008 at the COSAFA U-20 Challenge Cup in South Africa, when he was called to replace another referee who had failed a fitness test.

Sikazwe was one of the referees for the 2015 Africa Cup of Nations. He refereed the 2016 FIFA Club World Cup final in Japan and the 2017 Africa Cup of Nations Final in Gabon. Sikazwe was selected to officiate at the 2018 FIFA World Cup in Russia, and made his debut in the Belgium vs Panama Group G game on 18 June. The match also saw him going into the record books as he became the first Zambian referee to officiate a game at the FIFA World Cup finals.

Sikazwe also refereed at the 2021 Africa Cup of Nations, where he came under scrutiny for incorrectly calling for full-time twice in the Group F game between Mali and Tunisia on 12 January 2022: first at the 86th minute, and again before the 91st minute by about 17 seconds. He announced the return of the match after 25 minutes of stopping to complete three minutes, but the Tunisian team refused to complete it. An AFCON representative stated that Sikazwe suffered heat stroke, which contributed to his mishandling of the match. On 7 January 2023, he officiated his last career match between NAPSA Stars and Red Arrows.

2018 FIFA World Cup
Date	Match	Venue	Round
18 June 2018	Belgium – Panama	Fisht Olympic Stadium, Sochi	Group stage
28 June 2018	Japan – Poland	Volgograd Arena, Volgograd	Group stage

2022 FIFA World Cup
Date	Match	Venue	Round
23 November 2022	Belgium – Canada	Ahmad bin Ali Stadium, Al Rayyan	Group stage

Preceded by (Iran) Alireza Faghani	FIFA Club World Cup Final Referee; 2016	Succeeded by (Mexico) César Ramos
