= 2025–26 Pyramids FC season =

Pyramids FC
2025–26 season
- Chairman: Mamdouh Eid
- Manager: Krunoslav Jurčić
- Stadium: 30 June Stadium
- Egyptian Premier League: 4th
- Egypt Cup: Round of 32
- Egyptian League Cup: Group stage
- Egyptian Super Cup: Semi-final
- CAF Champions League: Group stage
- CAF Super Cup: Winners
- FIFA Intercontinental Cup: Semi-final
- Top goalscorer: League: Mohamed Chibi; Ewerton; Walid El Karti; Fiston Mayele (2 each); All: Fiston Mayele (9 goals)
- Biggest win: Tala'ea El Gaish SC 0–4 Pyramids FC
Home colours	Away colours	Third colours
- All statistics correct as of 17 November 2025.

The 2025–26 season is the eighth season in the history of Pyramids FC and the eighth consecutive season in the Premier League. In addition to the domestic league, Pyramids competes in the domestic cup, the Egyptian League Cup, the CAF Champions League, the 2025 CAF Super Cup, and the 2025 FIFA Intercontinental Cup.

== Season summary ==
On 18 October 2025, Pyramids won their maiden CAF Super Cup title with a 1–0 win over RS Berkane at the 30 June Stadium in Cairo. Fiston Mayele scored the only goal of the match in the 75th minute.

== Kits ==
Supplier: Puma / Main sponsor: Abu Dhabi Developmental Holding Company

Home	Alt. Home	Away	Third	Goalkeeper	Goalkeeper alternate	Goalkeeper alternate 2	Goalkeeper alternate 3

== Squad ==
As of 3 February 2026

Note: Flags indicate national team as defined under FIFA eligibility rules; some limited exceptions apply. Players may hold more than one non-FIFA nationality.

No.	Pos.	Nation	Player
1	GK	EGY	Ahmed El Shenawy
3	DF	EGY	Mahmoud Marei
4	DF	EGY	Ahmed Samy
5	DF	EGY	Ali Gabr (captain)
6	DF	EGY	Osama Galal
7	MF	EGY	Youssef Obama
8	MF	BFA	Blati Touré
9	FW	COD	Fiston Mayele
10	FW	EGY	Ramadan Sobhi
11	FW	EGY	Mostafa Fathi
12	DF	EGY	Ahmed Tawfik
14	MF	EGY	Mohanad Lasheen
15	DF	MAR	Mohamed Chibi
17	MF	EGY	Zalaka
18	MF	MAR	Walid El Karti
19	FW	EGY	Marwan Hamdy

No.	Pos.	Nation	Player
21	DF	EGY	Mohamed Hamdy
22	GK	EGY	Sherif Ekramy
23	MF	EGY	Ahmed Atef
25	FW	JOR	Odeh Al-Fakhouri
26	FW	EGY	Mohamed El Gabbas
27	MF	EGY	Nasser Maher
28	GK	EGY	Mahmoud Gad
29	DF	EGY	Karim Hafez
30	FW	EGY	Mostafa Ziko
32	MF	BRA	Ewerton
33	MF	PLE	Hamed Hamdan
35	FW	ZAM	Pascal Phiri
77	MF	EGY	Mohamed Reda
99	GK	EGY	Ziad Haytham
—	DF	EGY	Fawzi El Henawy
—	FW	EGY	Emad Mayhoub

== Transfers ==
=== In ===
Date	Pos.	Player	From	Fee	Ref.
28 July 2025	FW	(Brazil) Ewerton	(Czech Republic) Baník Ostrava	€2,800,000	
7 August 2025	GK	(Egypt) Mahmoud Gad	(Egypt) Al Masry SC	$625,000	
7 August 2025	FW	(Egypt) Mostafa Ziko	(Egypt) ZED FC		
3 February 2026	FW	(Jordan) Odeh Al-Fakhouri	(Jordan) Al-Hussein	Undisclosed	

=== Out ===
Date	Pos.	Player	To	Fee	Ref.
22 July 2025	FW	(Egypt) Ibrahim Adel	(United Arab Emirates) Al Jazira	€4,300,000	
8 August 2025	FW	(Egypt) Youssef Ossama Nabih	(Egypt) ZED FC	Free transfer	
8 August 2025	MF	(Egypt) Mahmoud Saber	(Egypt) ZED FC	Loan	
July 2025	DF	(Egypt) Abdallah Magdy	(Egypt) Ceramica Cleopatra	Loan	
2 July 2025	MF	(Egypt) Islam Issa	(Egypt) Ceramica Cleopatra	Undisclosed	
27 July 2025	FW	(South Africa) Fagrie Lakay	(Egypt) Ceramica Cleopatra	Undisclosed	

== Competitions ==
=== Egyptian Premier League ===
==== Regular season ====
Pos	Team	Pld	W	D	L	GF	GA	GD	Pts	Qualification
1	Zamalek	20	13	4	3	32	13	+19	43	Qualification for the championship play-offs
2	Pyramids	20	13	4	3	33	15	+18	43	Qualification for the championship play-offs
3	Al Ahly	20	11	7	2	33	19	+14	40	Qualification for the championship play-offs
4	Ceramica Cleopatra	20	11	5	4	29	16	+13	38	Qualification for the championship play-offs
5	Al Masry	20	8	8	4	29	20	+9	32	Qualification for the championship play-offs

Source: Soccerway (regular season)
Rules for classification: 1) Points; 2) Goal difference; 3) Goals scored.

===== Results summary =====
Overall								Home						Away					
Pld	W	D	L	GF	GA	GD	Pts	W	D	L	GF	GA	GD	W	D	L	GF	GA	GD
9	6	2	1	15	5	+10	20	5	0	1	11	3	+8	1	2	0	4	2	+2

Last updated: 2 November 2025.
Source: Soccerway

===== Results by round =====
Round	1	2	3	4	5	6	7	8	9	10
Ground	A	H	A	H	A	H	H	H	H	
Result	D	W	D	L	W	W	W	W	W	
Position	16	5	4	10	10	6	4	7	4	

Updated to match(es) played on 2 November 2025. Source: worldfootball
A = Away; H = Home; W = Win; D = Draw; L = Loss

=== Egyptian Super Cup ===
6 November 2025 Semi-finals	Zamalek	0–0 (5–4 p)	Pyramids	Abu Dhabi
21:30		Report		Stadium: Al Nahyan Stadium; Referee: Mohamed Maarouf (Egypt)
	Penalties
	El Said (penalty scored); El Wensh (penalty scored); Maher (penalty scored); Shehata (penalty scored); Jaziri (penalty scored)		(penalty scored) Hamdi; (penalty scored) Ewerton; (penalty scored) Magdy; (penalty scored) El Karti; (penalty missed) Ziko

9 November 2025 Third place match	Ceramica Cleopatra	2–1	Pyramids	Abu Dhabi
16:45	Belhadji 33' (pen.), 49' (pen.)	Report	Ziko 44'	Stadium: Al Nahyan Stadium; Referee: Omar al-Ali (UAE)

=== CAF Champions League ===
==== Group stage ====
The group stage draw was held on 3 November 2025.

Pos	Team	Pld	W	D	L	GF	GA	GD	Pts	Qualification
1	(Egypt) Pyramids	6	5	1	0	14	2	+12	16	Advance to knockout stage
2	(Morocco) RS Berkane	6	3	1	2	8	6	+2	10	Advance to knockout stage
3	(Zambia) Power Dynamos	6	2	1	3	4	7	−3	7	
4	(Nigeria) Rivers United	6	0	1	5	2	13	−11	1	

Source: CAF
Rules for classification: Group stage tiebreakers

22 November 2025 1	Pyramids (Egypt)	3–0	(Nigeria) Rivers United	30 June Stadium, Cairo
21:00 UTC+2	Atef 52', 57', 72'	Report		Referee: Mahmood Ismail (Sudan)

29 November 2025 2	Power Dynamos (Zambia)	0–1	(Egypt) Pyramids	Levy Mwanawasa Stadium, Ndola
18:00 UTC+2		Report	Reda 51'	Referee: Omar Artan (Somalia)

24 January 2026 3	RS Berkane (Morocco)	0–0	(Egypt) Pyramids	Berkane Municipal Stadium, Berkane
20:00 UTC+1		Report		Referee: Yannick Malala (DR Congo)

1 February 2026 4	Pyramids (Egypt)	3–0	(Morocco) RS Berkane	30 June Stadium, Cairo
18:00 UTC+2	Zalaka 11'; Maher 74'; Atef 80'	Report		Referee: Abdel Aziz Bouh (Mauritania)

8 February 2026 5	Rivers United (Nigeria)	1–4	(Egypt) Pyramids	Godswill Akpabio International Stadium, Uyo
17:00 UTC+1	Manyo 33'	Report	Fathi 52'; Ma. Hamdy 77' (pen.); Al-Fakhouri 88'; Maher 90+1'	Referee: Mehrez Melki (Tunisia)

14 February 2026 6	Pyramids (Egypt)	3–1	(Zambia) Power Dynamos	30 June Stadium, Cairo
21:00 UTC+2	Ziko 17'; Obama 33'; Ewerton 59'	Report	Mulambia 19'	Referee: Pierre Atcho (Gabon)

==== Round of 16 ====
13 March 2026 First Leg	AS FAR (Morocco)	1–1	(Egypt) Pyramids	Rabat Olympic Stadium, Rabat
22:00 UTC+0	Hammoudan 8'	Report	Zalaka 52'	Attendance: 0 (close doors); Referee: Omar Artan (Somalia)

21 March 2026 Second Leg	Pyramids (Egypt)	1–2 (2–3 agg.)	(Morocco) AS FAR	30 June Stadium, Cairo
18:00 UTC+2	Mayele 62'	Report	Slim 9'; Hrimat 54'	Attendance: 2,000; Referee: Dahane Beida (Mauritania)

=== CAF Super Cup ===
18 October 2025 Final	Pyramids (Egypt)	1–0	(Morocco) RS Berkane	30 June Stadium, Cairo
20:00 UTC+2	Mayele 75'			Referee: Mahmood Ismail (Sudan)

=== FIFA Intercontinental Cup ===
14 September 2025 African–Asian–Pacific Cup play-off	Pyramids (Egypt)	3–0	(New Zealand) Auckland City	Cairo, Egypt
21:00 EGY	El Karti 14'; Hamdy 74'; Ziko 85'	Report		Stadium: 30 June Stadium; Attendance: 4,157; Referee: Adham Makhadmeh (Jordan)

23 September 2025 African–Asian–Pacific Cup	Al-Ahli (Saudi Arabia)	1–3	(Egypt) Pyramids	Jeddah, Saudi Arabia
21:00 AST	Toney 45' (pen.)	Report	Mayele 21', 71', 75'	Stadium: King Abdullah Sports City; Attendance: 49,284; Referee: István Kovács (Romania)

13 December 2025 Challenger Cup	Flamengo (Brazil)	2–0	(Egypt) Pyramids	Al Rayyan
20:00 AST	Pereira 24'; Danilo 52'	Report		Stadium: Ahmad bin Ali Stadium; Attendance: 8,368; Referee: Abdulrahman Al-Jassim (Qatar)
