= 2025 Egypt Cup final =

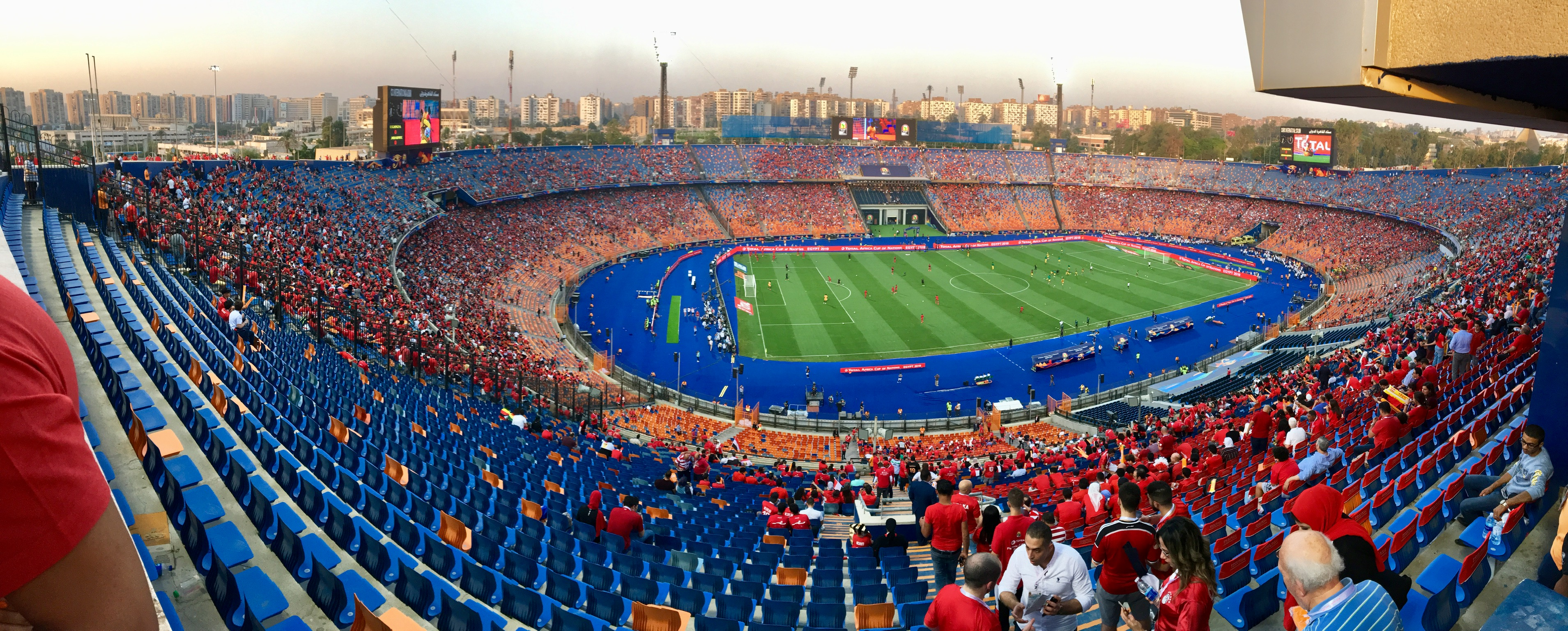
- Cairo International Stadium hosted the match
Zamalek	Pyramids
1	1
- After extra time Zamalek won 8–7 on penalties
- Date: 5 June 2025
- Venue: Cairo International Stadium, Cairo
- Referee: Mahmoud Bassiouni
- Attendance: 23,000

The 2025 Egypt Cup final was the concluding match of the 2024–25 Egypt Cup, the 93rd edition of the tournament organized by the Egyptian Football Association. It was played between Zamalek and Pyramids on 5 June 2025 at Cairo International Stadium in Nasr City, Cairo.

The match was originally scheduled for 20 May 2025 but was postponed to 5 June 2025. After a 1–1 draw in regular and extra time, Zamalek won 8–7 in a dramatic penalty shoot‑out, earning their 29th Egypt Cup title.

== Route to the final ==
Zamalek		Round	Pyramids
Opponent	Result	2024–25 Egypt Cup	Opponent	Result
Abou Qir Fertilizers	2–0	Round of 32	Al Mansoura	3–0
Modern Sport	2–1 (a.e.t.)	Round of 16	Al Mokawloon Al Arab	2–0
Smouha	4–2	Quarter-finals	ENPPI	2–1
Ceramica Cleopatra	2–1	Semi-finals	National Bank	4–0

== Background ==
Pyramids entered the final as the defending champions, having won the competition for the first time in their history the previous season. Their rise in domestic football had been mirrored by continental success as well; earlier in 2025, Pyramids clinched their first-ever CAF Champions League title, marking a historic milestone for the club.

In contrast, Zamalek, one of Egypt's most decorated teams, were aiming to reclaim the domestic cup title and continue their tradition of cup success. The final also marked a rematch of the 2019 final, where Zamalek had emerged victorious 3–0 against Pyramids.

Notably, Fiston Mayele, the top scorer for Pyramids during the cup run and continental campaign, was absent from the squad due to international duty with the DR Congo national team for the upcoming friendly matches.

== Match ==
=== Details ===
5 June 2025
20:30 CAST

Zamalek	1–1 (a.e.t.)	Pyramids
Mansi 78'	Report	A. Atef 29'
Penalties
Abdelmaguid (penalty scored); Shehata (penalty scored); Bentayg (penalty scored); Mah. Hamdy (penalty scored); Shalaby (penalty missed); Maher (penalty scored); Mansi (penalty missed); El Zenary (penalty scored); Fatouh (penalty scored); Shikabala (penalty scored)	8–7	(penalty scored) Hafez; (penalty missed) Fathi; (penalty scored) Mar. Hamdy; (penalty scored) Tawfik; (penalty scored) Obama; (penalty scored) El Karti; (penalty missed) Samy; (penalty scored) Touré; (penalty scored) Moh. Hamdy; (penalty missed) Gabr

Cairo International Stadium, Cairo
Attendance: 23,000
Referee: Mahmoud Bassiouni

GK	16	(Egypt) Mohamed Sobhy		(substituted off) 120+1'
RB	4	(Egypt) Omar Gaber (c)		(substituted off) 89'
CB	28	(Egypt) Mahmoud Hamdy	(yellow card) 119'
CB	5	(Egypt) Hossam Abdelmaguid
LB	13	(Egypt) Ahmed Fatouh
CM	17	(Egypt) Mohamed Shehata
CM	8	(Egypt) Donga	(yellow card) 45+3'	(substituted off) 46'
AM	19	(Egypt) Abdallah El Said		(substituted off) 84'
RW	7	(Egypt) Mostafa Shalaby
LW	12	(Egypt) Seif Gaafar		(substituted off) 63'
CF	30	(Tunisia) Seifeddine Jaziri		(substituted off) 46'
Substitutes:
GK	1	(Egypt) Mohamed Awad		(substituted on) 120+1'
DF	6	(Egypt) Mostafa El Zenary		(substituted on) 89'
DF	15	(Morocco) Sallah Moussaddaq
DF	3	(Morocco) Mahmoud Bentayg		(substituted on) 63'
MF	39	(Egypt) Mohamed ElSayed
MF	22	(Egypt) Nasser Maher		(substituted on) 46'
MF	10	(Egypt) Shikabala		(substituted on) 84'
MF	31	(Egypt) Ahmed Abdel Rahim
FW	9	(Egypt) Nasser Mansi		(substituted on) 46'
Manager:
(Egypt) Ayman El Ramadi

GK	1	(Egypt) Ahmed El Shenawy (c)		(substituted off) 83'
RB	15	(Morocco) Mohamed Chibi	(yellow card) 14'	(substituted off) 90'
CB	3	(Egypt) Mahmoud Marei		(substituted off) 90'
CB	4	(Egypt) Ahmed Samy
LB	21	(Egypt) Mohamed Hamdy
CM	14	(Egypt) Mohanad Lasheen	(yellow card) 90+5'	(substituted off) 91'
CM	8	(Burkina Faso) Blati Touré	(yellow card) 65'
AM	18	(Morocco) Walid El Karti
RW	30	(Egypt) Ibrahim Adel		(substituted off) 65'
LW	23	(Egypt) Ahmed Atef		(substituted off) 65'
CF	19	(Egypt) Marwan Hamdy
Substitutes:
GK	22	(Egypt) Sherif Ekramy		(substituted on) 83'
DF	12	(Egypt) Ahmed Tawfik		(substituted on) 90'
DF	5	(Egypt) Ali Gabr		(substituted on) 90'
MF	29	(Egypt) Karim Hafez		(substituted on) 65'
MF	20	(Egypt) Abdel Rahman Magdy
FW	11	(Egypt) Mostafa Fathi		(substituted on) 65'
FW	7	(Egypt) Youssef Obama		(substituted on) 91'
FW	26	(Egypt) Mohamed El Gabbas
FW	27	(Nigeria) Sodiq Awujoola
Manager:
(Croatia) Krunoslav Jurčić			Booked

Assistant referees:
Sami Helhal
Youssef El-Bassaty
Fourth official:
Mahmoud Nagy
Reserve assistant referee:
Mohamed Youssef
Video assistant referee:
Hossam Azab
Assistant video assistant referee:
Ahmed Tawfik Taleb
Support video assistant referee:
Wael Farhan

Match rules

- 90 minutes
- 30 minutes of extra time if necessary
- Penalty shoot-out if scores still level
- Nine named substitutes
- Maximum of five substitutions, with a sixth allowed in extra time (Note: Each team was given only three opportunities to make substitutions, with a fourth opportunity in extra time, excluding substitutions made at half-time, before the start of extra time and at half-time in extra time.)

== See also ==
- 2024–25 Egypt Cup
