= 2024–25 Pyramids FC season =

Pyramids
2024–25 season
- Chairman: Mamdouh Eid
- Manager: Krunoslav Jurčić
- Stadium: 30 June Stadium
- Egyptian Premier League: 2nd
- Egypt Cup: Runners-up
- Egyptian League Cup: Group stage
- Egyptian Super Cup: Third place
- CAF Champions League: Winners
- Top goalscorer: League: Ibrahim Adel; Fiston Mayele (8 each); All: Fiston Mayele (18)
- Biggest win: JKU 0–6 Pyramids; Pyramids 6–0 Djoliba
- Biggest defeat: ES Tunis 2–0 Pyramids
Home colours	Away colours
- All statistics correct as of 12 October 2025.

The 2024–25 season is the seventh season in the history of Pyramids FC and the seventh consecutive season in the Premier League. In addition to the domestic league, Pyramids competes in the domestic cup, the Egyptian League Cup and the CAF Champions League.

== Kits ==
Supplier: Puma / Main sponsor: Abu Dhabi Developmental Holding Company

Home	Home alternate	Away	Goalkeeper	Goalkeeper alternate	Goalkeeper alternate 2

== Transfers ==
=== In ===
Date	Pos.	Player	From	Fee	Ref.
20 August 2024	MF	(Egypt) Mohamed Sadek	(Egypt) Modern Sport	Loan return	
31 August 2024	MF	(Egypt) Abdel Rahman Magdy	(Egypt) Ismaily	Undisclosed	
1 September 2024	MF	(Egypt) Youssef Obama	(Egypt) Zamalek	Free	
1 September 2024	DF	(Egypt) Tarek Alaa	(Egypt) Smouha	18,000,000 EGP	
2 October 2024	FW	(Nigeria) Sodiq Awujoola	(Egypt) Ceramica Cleopatra	Loan	

=== Out ===
Date	Pos.	Player	From	Fee	Ref.
27 August 2024	MF	(Egypt) Mohamed Sadek	(Egypt) Ceramica Cleopatra	Undisclosed	
6 September 2024	FW	(Palestine) Mahmoud Wadi	(Libya) Asswehly	End of contract	
25 September 2024	MF	(Egypt) Mahmoud Saber	(Egypt) Smouha	Loan	
1 October 2024	DF	(Egypt) Abdallah Magdy	(Egypt) Ceramica Cleopatra	Loan	
2 October 2024	MF	(Egypt) Islam Issa	(Egypt) Ceramica Cleopatra	Loan	
2 October 2024	FW	(South Africa) Fagrie Lakay	(Egypt) Ceramica Cleopatra	Loan	
2 October 2024	MF	(Egypt) Mahmoud Zalaka	(Egypt) Ceramica Cleopatra	Loan	
20 October 2024	DF	(Egypt) Abdelrahman Semida	(Egypt) Ghazl El Mahalla	Free	
24 October 2024	GK	(Egypt) Ahmed Daador	(Egypt) Al Ittihad	Free	
25 October 2024	FW	(Nigeria) Tolulope Ojo	(Egypt) El Gouna	Free	
4 January 2025	MF	(Egypt) Youssef Osama	(Egypt) Al Ittihad	Loan	

== Friendlies ==
9 October 2024 Friendly	Yenil Antalya (Turkey)	0–18	(Egypt) Pyramids	Turkey
		Report

13 October 2024 Friendly	Konyaspor (Turkey)	1–0	(Egypt) Pyramids	Konya, Turkey
	Bostan 92'	Report		Stadium: Konya Metropolitan Municipality Stadium
Note: Two periods of 60 minutes each

2 November 2024 Friendly	Pyramids (Egypt)	8–0	(Egypt) Samanoud	Cairo
16:00 UTC+2	Abdelaati; Hamdy; Fathi; El Gabbas; Gabr; Mayhob; Magdy	Report		Stadium: 30 June Stadium

15 November 2024 Friendly	Pyramids (Egypt)	2–1	(Egypt) El Gouna	Cairo
16:00 UTC+2	Obama; Hamdy	Report		Stadium: 30 June Stadium

== Competitions ==
=== Overall record ===
Competition	First match	Last match	Starting round	Final position	Record							
Competition	First match	Last match	Starting round	Final position	Pld	W	D	L	GF	GA	GD	Win %
Egyptian Premier League regular season	1 November 2024	5 March 2025	Matchday 1	1st	17	13	3	1	32	10	+22	76.47
Egyptian Premier League Championship round	12 March 2025	30 May 2025	Matchday 1	2nd	8	4	2	2	15	10	+5	50.00
Egypt Cup	4 February 2025	5 June 2025	Round of 32	Runner-up	5	4	1	0	12	2	+10	80.00
Egyptian League Cup	17 December 2024	16 April 2025	Group stage	Group stage	3	1	1	1	4	4	+0	33.33
Egyptian Super Cup	20 October 2024	24 October 2024	Semi-finals	Third place	2	0	2	0	3	3	+0	0.00
CAF Champions League	18 August 2024	1 June 2025	Second round	Winners	16	10	4	2	37	14	+23	62.50
Total					51	32	13	6	103	43	+60	62.75

Last updated: 5 June 2025
Source: Competitions

=== Egyptian Premier League ===
==== Regular season ====
Pos	Team	Pld	W	D	L	GF	GA	GD	Pts	Qualification or relegation
1	Pyramids	17	13	3	1	32	10	+22	42	Qualification for the championship play-offs
2	Al Ahly	17	11	6	0	30	9	+21	39	Qualification for the championship play-offs
3	Zamalek	17	9	5	3	30	16	+14	32	Qualification for the championship play-offs
4	Al Masry	17	8	6	3	19	11	+8	30	Qualification for the championship play-offs
5	National Bank of Egypt	17	8	5	4	22	18	+4	29	Qualification for the championship play-offs

Source: Soccerway (regular season)
Rules for classification: 1) Points; 2) Goal difference; 3) Goals scored.

===== Results summary =====
Overall								Home						Away					
Pld	W	D	L	GF	GA	GD	Pts	W	D	L	GF	GA	GD	W	D	L	GF	GA	GD
17	13	3	1	32	10	+22	42	7	1	0	20	4	+16	6	2	1	12	6	+6

Last updated: 11 March 2025.

===== Results by round =====
Round	1	2	3	4	5	6	7	8	9	10	11	12	13	14	15	16	17
Ground	H	A	H	A	A	H	A	H	A	A	H	A	H	A	H	A	H
Result	D	W	W	L	D	W	W	W	W	D	W	W	W	W	W	W	W
Position	6	5	2	4	4	3	3	3	1	1	1	1	1	1	1	1	1

Updated to match(es) played on 5 March 2025. Source: worldfootball
A = Away; H = Home; W = Win; D = Draw; L = Loss

===== Matches =====
The league schedule was released on 19 October 2024.

1 November 2024 1	Pyramids	1–1	Petrojet	Cairo
17:00 UTC+2	Mayele 7'		Chukwudi 3'	Stadium: 30 June Stadium; Referee: Mahmoud El Banna

8 November 2024 2	ENPPI	1–2	Pyramids	Cairo
20:00 UTC+2	Fawzi 45+2' (pen.)		Atef 3', 35'	Stadium: Petrosport Stadium; Referee: Abdel Aziz El-Sayed

22 November 2024 3	Pyramids	3–1	National Bank	Cairo
17:00 UTC+2	Fathi 50'; Awujoola 52', 74'		Abdel Ghani 45'	Stadium: 30 June Stadium; Referee: Mahmoud Bassiouni

2 December 2024 4	Al Masry	1–0	Pyramids	Suez
17:00 UTC+2	El Shamy 55'			Stadium: Suez Stadium; Referee: Amin Omar

21 December 2024 5	Ismaily	1–1	Pyramids	Ismailia
20:00 UTC+2	Hamdi 29'		Galal 45'	Stadium: Ismailia Stadium; Referee: Abdelaziz El Sayed

25 December 2024 6	Pyramids	3–0	Pharco	Cairo
20:00 UTC+2	Chibi 22'; Awujoola 53'; Mayele 68'			Stadium: 30 June Stadium; Referee: Ahmed Hamdi

30 December 2024 7	El Gouna	0–1	Pyramids	El Gouna
17:00 UTC+2			El Gabbas 90+4'	Stadium: Khaled Bichara Stadium; Referee: Mohamed El Sabahi

15 January 2025 8	Pyramids	3–0	Ghazl El Mahalla	Cairo
16:00 UTC+2	Gabr 34'; Adel 51'; Mayele 84'			Stadium: 30 June Stadium; Referee: Tarek Magdy

22 January 2025 9	ZED	0–1	Pyramids	Cairo
19:00 UTC+2		Report	Mayele 80'	Stadium: Cairo International Stadium; Referee: (Egypt) Mohammed Yousef

26 January 2025 10	Al Ahly	2–2	Pyramids	Cairo
19:00	Ramy Rabia 52'; Gradišar 54'	Report	Ramy Rabia 18' (o.g.); Ahmed Tawfik (red card) 41'; Chibi (yellow card) 41'; Mostafa Fathi 51' (pen.); Karim Hafez (yellow card) 74'; Ahmed El Shenawy (yellow card) 88'; Ahmed Samy (yellow card) 88'; Awujoola (yellow card) 88'; Ali Gabr (yellow card) 90+1'	Stadium: Cairo International Stadium; Referee: (Egypt) Mahmoud El Banna

31 January 2025 11	Pyramids	3–0	Zamalek	Cairo
19:00	Chibi (yellow card) 11'; Ahmed Samy (yellow card) 32'; Mayele 58'; Mostafa Fathi 64'; Ibrahim Adel 70'; Mohamed Hamdy (yellow card) 86'	Report	Hossam Abdelmaguid (yellow card) 28'; Nasser Mansi (yellow card) 83'	Stadium: 30 June Stadium; Referee: (Egypt) Mahmoud Bassiouni

7 February 2025 12	Smouha	0–1	Pyramids	Alexandria
16:00	El Ouadi (yellow card) 59'; Ashraf Magdi (yellow card) 90+3'	Report	Tarek Alaa (yellow card) 33'; El Karti (yellow card) 52'; Ahmed Samy (yellow card) 61'; Ali Gabr 90+7'	Stadium: Borg El Arab Stadium; Referee: (Egypt) Ibrahim Mohamed

==== Championship Round ====
Pos	Team	Pld	W	D	L	GF	GA	GD	Pts	Qualification
1	Al Ahly (C)	8	6	1	1	22	9	+13	58 (Note: Al Ahly were initially deducted three points for refusing to play their away fixture against Zamalek, scheduled to be played on 11 March 2025. The points deduction was later cancelled by the Egyptian Premier League.)	Qualification for the Champions League first or second round
2	Pyramids	8	4	2	2	15	10	+5	56	Qualification for the Champions League first or second round
3	Zamalek	8	4	3	1	14	6	+8	47	Qualification for the Confederation Cup first or second round
4	Al Masry	8	3	3	2	10	9	+1	42	Qualification for the Confederation Cup first or second round
5	National Bank of Egypt SC	8	2	3	3	13	12	+1	38	

Source: Soccerway (championship round)
Rules for classification: 1) Points; 2) Goal difference; 3) Goals scored; 4) Play-off tie.
(Note: Clubs qualified for this phase with the full regular season points they got, but without goals for or against)
(C) Champions

===== Results Summary =====
Overall								Home						Away					
Pld	W	D	L	GF	GA	GD	Pts	W	D	L	GF	GA	GD	W	D	L	GF	GA	GD
2	0	2	0	1	1	0	2	0	2	0	1	1	0	0	0	0	0	0	0

Last updated: 14 April 2025.

===== Matches =====
12 March 2025 1	Pyramids	0–0	Al Masry	Cairo
21:30 UTC+2				Stadium: 30 June Stadium

12 April 2025 2	Pyramids	1–1	Al Ahly	Cairo
19:00 UTC+2	Chibi 85'	Report	Reda 90+6'	Stadium: 30 June Stadium; Referee: Danny Makkelie (Netherlands)

=== Egypt Cup ===
4 February 2025 Round of 32	Pyramids	3–0	El Mansoura	Cairo
17:30 UTC+2	Ibrahim 21' (o.g.); Obama 90+2'; Hamdy 90+5'			Stadium: 30 June Stadium

8 March 2025 Round of 16	Pyramids	2–0	Al Mokawloon Al Arab	Cairo
21:30 UTC+2				Stadium: 30 June Stadium

15 March 2025 Quarter-finals	Pyramids	2–1	ENPPI	Cairo
21:30 UTC+2	Fathi 15'; Obama 90+8'		El Agouz 53'	Stadium: 30 June Stadium

28 March 2025 Semi-finals	Pyramids	4–0	National Bank	Cairo
21:30 UTC+2	Mayele 13'; Atef 18'; Touré 25'; Sobhi 63'			Stadium: 30 June Stadium

5 June 2025 Final	Zamalek	1–1 (a.e.t.) (8–7 p)	Pyramids	Cairo
20:30 UTC+3				Stadium: Cairo International Stadium; Referee: Mahmoud Bassiouni

=== Egyptian League Cup ===
==== Group stage ====
Pos	Team	Pld	W	D	L	GF	GA	GD	Pts	Qualification
1	Haras El Hodoud	3	3	0	0	5	1	+4	9	Advance to knockout stage
2	Ismaily	3	1	1	1	5	4	+1	4	Advance to knockout stage
3	Pyramids	3	1	1	1	4	4	0	4	
4	Al Ittihad	3	0	0	3	0	5	−5	0	

Source: EPL
Rules for classification: Group stage tiebreakers

17 December 2024 1	Pyramids	2–0	Al Ittihad	Cairo
19:00 UTC+2	El Karti 64'; El Gabbas 88'			Stadium: Al Salam Stadium; Referee: Mahmoud El Banna
Note: The match was moved from the 30 June Stadium due to maintenance.

23 March 2025 2	Ismaily	2–2	Pyramids	Ismailia
21:00				Stadium: Ismailia Stadium

16 April 2025 3	Haras El Hodoud	2–0	Pyramids	Alexandria
20:00	Ouka 45+2'; Etouga 77'			Stadium: Haras El Hodoud Stadium

=== Egyptian Super Cup ===
20 October 2024 Semi-finals	Zamalek	1–1 (5–4 p)	Pyramids	Abu Dhabi, United Arab Emirates
17:05 UTC+4	Jaziri 40'; Bentayg (yellow card) 50'		Adel 14'; Sobhi (penalty missed) 52'	Stadium: Al Nahyan Stadium; Referee: Mohamed Maarouf
	Penalties
	El Said (penalty scored); Mathlouthi (penalty scored); Abdelmaguid (penalty scored); Mansi (penalty scored); Zizo (penalty scored)		(penalty scored) Hafez; (penalty scored) Magdy; (penalty scored) Obama; (penalty scored) Mayele; (penalty missed) Fathi

24 October 2024 Third-place	Pyramids	2–2 (5–4 p)	Ceramica Cleopatra	Abu Dhabi, United Arab Emirates
17:05 UTC+4	Magdy 34' (o.g.); Ma. Hamdy 85'		Issa 20'; Belhadji 77' (pen.)	Stadium: Al Nahyan Stadium; Referee: Mahmoud Nagi
	Penalties
	Ma. Hamdy (penalty scored); Obama (penalty scored); Sobhi (penalty scored); Hafez (penalty scored); Adel (penalty scored)		(penalty scored) Okoye Ebuka; (penalty scored) Belhadji; (penalty scored) Kendouci; (penalty scored) Nabil; (penalty missed) Mukka

=== CAF Champions League ===
==== First round ====
The draw was made on 11 July 2024.

18 August 2024 First leg	JKU (Zanzibar)	0–6	(Egypt) Pyramids	Cairo
20:00 UTC+3			Mayele 8'; El Karti 15'; Lasheen 27', 55'; Adel 32'; Zalaka 88'	Stadium: 30 June Stadium; Referee: Mohamed Ali Moussa (Niger)
Note: The match was played in Cairo due to the lack of a suitable venue in Zanzibar after an agreement by both parties.

24 August 2024 Second leg	Pyramids (Egypt)	3–1 (9–1 agg.)	(Zanzibar) JKU	Cairo
20:00 UTC+3	Saber 54'; El Gabbas 64'; Lakay 75'		Simba 58'	Stadium: 30 June Stadium; Referee: El Hadji Amadou Sy (Senegal)

==== Second round ====
14 September 2024 First leg	APR (Rwanda)	1–1	(Egypt) Pyramids	Kigali, Rwanda
18:00 UTC+2	Chibi 50' (o.g.)		Mayele 83'	Stadium: Amahoro Stadium; Referee: Daniel Nii Laryea (Ghana)

21 September 2024 Second leg	Pyramids (Egypt)	3–1 (4–2 agg.)	(Rwanda) APR	Cairo
21:00 UTC+3	Chibi 44'; Mayele 67'; Hafez 90+3' (pen.)		Seidu 10'	Stadium: 30 June Stadium; Referee: Mohamed Allaw (Chad)

==== Group stage ====
The group stage draw was held on 7 October 2024.

Pos	Team	Pld	W	D	L	GF	GA	GD	Pts	Qualification
1	(Tunisia) Espérance de Tunis	6	4	1	1	12	3	+9	13 (Note: Ranked on goal difference in head-to-head matches: Espérance de Tunis +1, Pyramids –1.)	Advance to knockout stage
2	(Egypt) Pyramids	6	4	1	1	14	4	+10	13	Advance to knockout stage
3	(Angola) Sagrada Esperança	6	1	2	3	3	10	−7	5	
4	(Mali) Djoliba	6	0	2	4	0	12	−12	2	

Source: CAF
Rules for classification: Group stage tiebreakers
Notes:

26 November 2024 1	Pyramids (Egypt)	5–1	(Angola) Sagrada Esperança	Cairo
18:00 UTC+2	Adel 17', 73'; Mo. Hamdy 50'; Mayele 77'; Atef 89'	Report	Cachí 90+2'	Stadium: 30 June Stadium; Referee: Louis Houngnandandé (Benin)

8 December 2024 2	Djoliba (Mali)	0–0	(Egypt) Pyramids	Bamako, Mali
16:00 UTC+0		Report		Stadium: 26 March Stadium; Referee: Mahamat Alhadji Allaou (Chad)

14 December 2024 3	ES Tunis (Tunisia)	2–0	(Egypt) Pyramids	Tunis, Tunisia
20:00 UTC+1	Belaïli 36'; Mokwana 45+3'	Report		Stadium: Hammadi Agrebi Stadium; Referee: Pacifique Ndabihawenimana (Burundi)

5 January 2025 4	Pyramids (Egypt)	2–1	(Tunisia) ES Tunis	Cairo
18:00 UTC+2	Fathi 90'; Adel 90+3'		Belaïli 56'	Stadium: 30 June Stadium; Referee: Messie Nkounkou (Republic of Congo)

11 January 2025 5	Sagrada Esperança (Angola)	0–1	(Egypt) Pyramids	Luanda, Angola
17:00 UTC+1			Hamdy 90+4'	Stadium: Estádio 11 de Novembro; Referee: Alhadi Allaou Mahamat (Chad)

18 January 2025 6	Pyramids (Egypt)	6–0	(Mali) Djoliba	Cairo
21:00 UTC+2	Awujoola 2'; Hamdy 10'; Fathi 53'; Sobhi 60' (pen.); Magdy 66'; Obama 77'		Simpara (penalty missed) 69'	Stadium: 30 June Stadium; Referee: Mahmood Ismail (Sudan)

==== Knockout Stage ====
===== Quarter-finals =====
1 April 2025 First Leg	Pyramids (Egypt)	4–1	(Morocco) AS FAR	Cairo, Egypt
21:00 UTC+2	Mayele 2', 12'; Adel 38', 67'	Report	Hadraf 45'	Stadium: 30 June Stadium; Attendance: 2,000; Referee: Omar Artan (Somalia)

8 April 2025 Second Leg	AS FAR (Morocco)	2–0 (3–4 agg.)	(Egypt) Pyramids	Meknes, Morocco
20:00 UTC+1	El Fahli 8'; Beya 82'	Report		Stadium: Honneur Stadium (Note: AS FAR will play their knockout stage home matches at Honneur Stadium, Meknes, instead of their regular stadium, Prince Moulay Abdellah Stadium, Rabat, due to renovation works.); Attendance: 12,000; Referee: Ibrahim Mutaz (Libya)

===== Semi-finals =====
19 April 2025 First leg	Orlando Pirates (South Africa)	0–0	(Egypt) Pyramids	Johannesburg, South Africa
18:00 UTC+2		Report		Stadium: Soccer City; Referee: Pacifique Ndabihawenimana (Burundi)

25 April 2025 Second leg	Pyramids (Egypt)	3–2 (3–2 agg.)	(South Africa) Orlando Pirates	Cairo, Egypt
21:00 UTC+3	Mayele 45+1', 84'; Sobhi 57'	Report	Mofokeng 41'; Nkota 52'	Stadium: 30 June Stadium; Referee: Tanguy Mebiame (Gabon)

===== Final =====
24 May 2025 First leg	Mamelodi Sundowns (South Africa)	1–1	(Egypt) Pyramids	Pretoria
15:00 UTC+2	Ribeiro 54'	Report	El Karti 90+4'	Stadium: Loftus Versfeld Stadium; Attendance: 50,000; Referee: Mahmood Ismail (Sudan)

1 June 2025 Second leg	Pyramids (Egypt)	2–1 (3–2 agg.)	(South Africa) Mamelodi Sundowns	Cairo
--:--	Mayele 23'; Samy 56'	Report	Rayners 75'	Stadium: 30 June Stadium; Attendance: 25,000; Referee: Omar Artan (Somalia)

== Statistics ==
=== Goalscorers ===
Rank	Pos.	Player	Premier League	Egypt Cup	EFL Cup	Super Cup	Champions League	Total
1	FW	(Democratic Republic of the Congo) Fiston Mayele	3	0	0	0	4	7
2	MF	(Egypt) Ibrahim Adel	1	0	0	1	4	6
3	FW	(Nigeria) Sodiq Awujoola	3	0	0	0	1	4
4	MF	(Egypt) Ahmed Atef	2	0	0	0	1	3
4	FW	(Egypt) Mohamed El Gabbas	1	0	1	0	1	3
4	MF	(Egypt) Mostafa Fathi	1	0	0	0	2	3
4	FW	(Egypt) Marwan Hamdy	0	0	0	1	2	3
8	MF	(Egypt) Mohanad Lasheen	0	0	0	0	2	2
8	MF	(Morocco) Walid El Karti	0	0	1	0	1	2
8	DF	(Morocco) Mohamed Chibi	1	0	0	0	1	2
11	DF	(Egypt) Ali Gabr	1	0	0	0	0	1
11	DF	(Egypt) Osama Galal	1	0	0	0	0	1
11	DF	(Egypt) Karim Hafez	0	0	0	0	1	1
11	DF	(Egypt) Mohamed Hamdy	0	0	0	0	1	1
11	FW	(South Africa) Fagrie Lakay	0	0	0	0	1	1
11	FW	(Egypt) Abdel Rahman Magdy	0	0	0	0	1	1
11	MF	(Egypt) Youssef Obama	0	0	0	0	1	1
11	MF	(Egypt) Mahmoud Saber	0	0	0	0	1	1
11	MF	(Egypt) Ramadan Sobhi	0	0	0	0	1	1
11	MF	(Egypt) Mahmoud Zalaka	0	0	0	0	1	1
Own goals			0	0	0	1	0	1
Totals			14	0	2	3	27	46

Last updated: 18 January 2025.
Source: Global Sports Archive
