= 2021–22 Pyramids FC season =

Pyramids FC
2021–22 season
- Owner: Salem Al Shamsi
- Manager: Ehab Galal (until 25 April); Takis Gonias (from 25 April); Jaime Pacheco (Note: Took the position in January 2023. Was in charge of two matches in the late-finished Egypt Cup.)
- Stadium: 30 June Stadium
- Egyptian Premier League: 2nd
- Egypt Cup: Runners-up
- EFA Cup: Group stage
- CAF Confederation Cup: Quarter-finals
- Top goalscorer: Ramadan Sobhi (7)
- Biggest win: Ismaily 0–4 Pyramids; Pyramids 5–1 Smouha
- Biggest defeat: Al Ahly 3–0 Pyramids
| Home colours | Away colours | Third colours |

The 2021–22 Pyramids FC season was the club's fourth season in existence and the fourth consecutive season in the top flight of Egyptian football. In addition to the domestic league, Pyramids participated in this season's editions of the Egypt Cup, the EFA Cup and the CAF Confederation Cup.

== Kits ==
Supplier: Puma / Main sponsor: MyWhoosh

| Home | Away | Third |

== Players ==
=== First-team squad ===
As of 29 January 2022

Note: Flags indicate national team as defined under FIFA eligibility rules; some limited exceptions apply. Players may hold more than one non-FIFA nationality.

| No. | Pos. | Nation | Player |
|---|---|---|---|
| 1 | GK | EGY | El Mahdy Soliman |
| 3 | DF | EGY | Ahmed Ayman Mansour |
| 4 | DF | EGY | Omar Gaber (vice-captain) |
| 5 | DF | EGY | Ali Gabr (3rd captain) |
| 6 | DF | EGY | Osama Galal |
| 7 | FW | BFA | Eric Traoré |
| 8 | FW | EGY | Islam Issa |
| 9 | FW | PLE | Mahmoud Wadi |
| 10 | FW | EGY | Ramadan Sobhi |
| 11 | MF | EGY | Mohamed Sadek |
| 12 | DF | EGY | Ahmed Tawfik |
| 14 | MF | EGY | Nabil Emad |
| 15 | MF | BFA | Blati Touré |
| 16 | GK | EGY | Ahmed El Shenawy |
| 17 | MF | EGY | Hesham Mohamed |
| 18 | MF | MAR | Walid El Karti |

| No. | Pos. | Nation | Player |
|---|---|---|---|
| 19 | MF | EGY | Abdallah El Said (captain) |
| 20 | FW | EGY | Abdallah Magdy |
| 21 | DF | EGY | Mohamed Hamdy |
| 22 | GK | EGY | Sherif Ekramy |
| 23 | FW | RSA | Fagrie Lakay |
| 24 | DF | EGY | Ahmed Fathy |
| 25 | DF | EGY | Ahmed Samy |
| 26 | FW | EGY | Mohamed El Gabbas |
| 27 | DF | EGY | Hussein El Sayed |
| 28 | FW | TUN | Fakhreddine Ben Youssef |
| 30 | FW | EGY | Ibrahim Adel |
| 33 | MF | EGY | Mahmoud Saber |
| 35 | MF | EGY | Ahmad Fawzi |
| 39 | DF | EGY | Abdo Semida |
| — | MF | EGY | Mostafa Fathi (on loan from Al-Taawoun) |

=== Out on loan ===
Note: Flags indicate national team as defined under FIFA eligibility rules; some limited exceptions apply. Players may hold more than one non-FIFA nationality.

| No. | Pos. | Nation | Player |
|---|---|---|---|
| — | GK | EGY | Ahmed Daadour (Eastern Company SC until 30 June 2022) |
| — | FW | GHA | John Antwi (at Tala'ea El Gaish until 30 June 2022) |

== Pre-season and friendlies ==
Win Draw Loss

| 30 September 2021 Friendly | Pyramids (Egypt) | 0–0 | (Egypt) Zamalek | Cairo, Egypt |
| | | Report | | Stadium: Air Defense Stadium sub-field |

| 13 November 2021 Friendly | Pyramids (Egypt) | 1–0 | (Egypt) Ghazl El Mahalla | Cairo, Egypt |
| | Saber | Report | | Stadium: 30 June Stadium |
Note: Match was played in two 60-minute halves.

== Competitions ==
=== Overview ===
| Competition | First match | Last match | Starting round | Final position | Record | | | | | | | |
| Competition | First match | Last match | Starting round | Final position | Pld | W | D | L | GF | GA | GD | Win % |
|---|---|---|---|---|---|---|---|---|---|---|---|---|
| Egyptian Premier League | 27 October 2021 | 30 August 2022 | Matchday 1 | 2nd | 34 | 22 | 5 | 7 | 56 | 25 | +31 | 64.71 |
| Egypt Cup | 28 March 2022 | 10 April 2023 | Round of 32 | Runners-up | 5 | 3 | 1 | 1 | 6 | 4 | +2 | 60.00 |
| EFA Cup | 12 January 2022 | 30 January 2022 | Group stage | Group stage | 5 | 1 | 1 | 3 | 5 | 6 | −1 | 20.00 |
| CAF Confederation Cup | 16 October 2021 | 24 April 2022 | Second round | Quarter-finals | 12 | 7 | 3 | 2 | 10 | 5 | +5 | 58.33 |
| Total | | | | | 56 | 33 | 10 | 13 | 77 | 40 | +37 | 58.93 |

Source: Soccerway

=== Egyptian Premier League ===
==== League table ====
| Pos | Team | Pld | W | D | L | GF | GA | GD | Pts | Qualification or relegation |
|---|---|---|---|---|---|---|---|---|---|---|
| 1 | Zamalek (Note: The 2021–22 Egyptian Premier League was not finished by the CAF deadline. As a result, the Egyptian Football Association announced that Zamalek and Al Ahly, who were at first and second place after 24 rounds respectively, represented Egypt in the 2022–23 CAF Champions League. Meanwhile, Future and Pyramids FC, who were at third and fourth place after 24 rounds respectively, represented Egypt in the 2022–23 CAF Confederation Cup.) (C) | 34 | 24 | 5 | 5 | 62 | 29 | +33 | 77 | Qualification for the Champions League |
| 2 | Pyramids | 34 | 22 | 5 | 7 | 56 | 25 | +31 | 71 | Qualification for the Confederation Cup |
| 3 | Al Ahly | 34 | 20 | 10 | 4 | 62 | 21 | +41 | 70 | Qualification for the Champions League |
| 4 | Tala'ea El Gaish | 34 | 14 | 14 | 6 | 27 | 24 | +3 | 56 (Note: Head-to-Head points: Tala'ea El Gaish 6, Future 0.) | |
| 5 | Future | 34 | 16 | 8 | 10 | 49 | 34 | +15 | 56 | Qualification for the Confederation Cup |

Source: Soccerway
Rules for classification: 1) Points; 2) Head-to-Head points; 3) Head-to-Head goal difference; 4) Head-to-Head goals scored; 5) Head-to-Head away goals scored; 6) Goal difference; 7) Goals scored.
(Note: Head-to-head record is used only after all the matches between the teams in question have been played).
(C) Champions

==== Results summary ====
| Overall | | | | | | | | Home | | | | | | Away | | | | | |
| Pld | W | D | L | GF | GA | GD | Pts | W | D | L | GF | GA | GD | W | D | L | GF | GA | GD |
|---|---|---|---|---|---|---|---|---|---|---|---|---|---|---|---|---|---|---|---|
| 34 | 22 | 5 | 7 | 56 | 25 | +31 | 71 | 12 | 2 | 3 | 29 | 10 | +19 | 10 | 3 | 4 | 27 | 15 | +12 |

Source: worldfootball

==== Results by round ====
| Round | 1 | 2 | 3 | 4 | 5 | 6 | 7 | 8 | 9 | 10 | 11 | 12 | 13 | 14 | 15 | 16 | 17 | 18 | 19 | 20 | 21 | 22 | 23 | 24 | 25 | 26 | 27 | 28 | 29 | 30 | 31 | 32 | 33 | 34 |
|---|---|---|---|---|---|---|---|---|---|---|---|---|---|---|---|---|---|---|---|---|---|---|---|---|---|---|---|---|---|---|---|---|---|---|
| Ground | H | A | H | A | H | A | H | A | H | A | H | A | H | A | H | H | A | A | H | A | H | A | H | A | H | A | H | A | H | A | H | A | A | H |
| Result | W | W | W | D | W | D | W | L | W | W | L | W | W | W | D | L | W | W | D | L | W | W | W | D | W | W | W | L | W | W | W | L | W | L |
| Position | | | | | | | | | | | | | | | | | | | | | | | | | | | | | | | | | | |

Source: worldfootball
A = Away; H = Home; W = Win; D = Draw; L = Loss

==== Matches ====
The league fixtures were announced on 12 October 2021.

| 27 October 2021 1 | Pyramids | 2–1 | Misr Lel Makkasa | Cairo |
| 18:30 EST (UTC+2) | | | | Stadium: 30 June Stadium |

| 31 October 2021 2 | Pharco | 1–2 | Pyramids | Alexandria |
| 17:30 EST (UTC+2) | | | | Stadium: Alexandria Stadium |

| 4 November 2021 3 | Pyramids | 3–0 | Al Ittihad | Cairo |
| 20:00 EST (UTC+2) | | | | Stadium: 30 June Stadium |

| 19 November 2021 4 | Al Masry | 2–2 | Pyramids | Borg El Arab |
| 15:00 EST (UTC+2) | | | | Stadium: Borg El Arab Stadium |

| 22 November 2021 5 | Pyramids | 3–0 | Eastern Company | Cairo |
| 15:00 EST (UTC+2) | | | | Stadium: 30 June Stadium |

| 21 December 2021 7 | Pyramids | 3–0 | Tala'ea El Gaish | Cairo |
| 17:30 EST (UTC+2) | | | | Stadium: 30 June Stadium |

| 25 December 2021 6 | ENPPI | 1–1 | Pyramids | Cairo |
| 15:00 EST (UTC+2) | | | | Stadium: Petrosport Stadium |

| 16 February 2022 9 | Pyramids | 1–0 | Ismaily | Cairo |
| 17:30 EST (UTC+2) | Samy 64' | | | Stadium: 30 June Stadium |

| 24 February 2022 10 | National Bank | 0–1 | Pyramids | Cairo |
| 17:30 EST (UTC+2) | | | Sobhy 81' | Stadium: Petrosport Stadium |

| 4 March 2022 12 | Al Mokawloon Al Arab | 0–2 | Pyramids | Cairo |
| 17:30 EST (UTC+2) | | | | Stadium: Osman Ahmed Osman Stadium |

| 8 March 2022 8 | Al Ahly | 3–0 | Pyramids | Cairo |
| 20:00 EST (UTC+2) | | | | Stadium: Al Salam Stadium |

| 6 April 2022 11 | Pyramids | 2–3 | Zamalek | Cairo |
| 21:30 EST (UTC+2) | | | | Stadium: 30 June Stadium |

| 9 April 2022 13 | Pyramids | 1–0 | Ghazl El Mahalla | Cairo |
| 21:30 EST (UTC+2) | Adel 81' | | | Stadium: 30 June Stadium |

| 27 April 2022 16 | Pyramids | 0–1 | Ceramica Cleopatra | Cairo |
| 21:30 EST (UTC+2) | | | | Stadium: 30 June Stadium |

| 1 May 2022 17 | El Gouna | 1–2 | Pyramids | El Gouna |
| 21:30 EST (UTC+2) | | | | Stadium: Khaled Bichara Stadium |

| 6 May 2022 14 | Smouha | 0–2 | Pyramids | Alexandria |
| 21:00 EST (UTC+2) | | | Ben Youssef 9'; Galal 58' | Stadium: Alexandria Stadium |

| 11 May 2022 18 | Misr Lel Makkasa | 0–2 | Pyramids | Cairo |
| 21:00 EST (UTC+2) | | | | Stadium: Cairo Military Academy Stadium |

| 15 May 2022 19 | Pyramids | 0–0 | Pharco | Cairo |
| 21:00 EST (UTC+2) | | | | Stadium: 30 June Stadium |

| 22 May 2022 20 | Al Ittihad | 1–0 | Pyramids | Alexandria |
| 21:00 EST (UTC+2) | | | | Stadium: Alexandria Stadium |

| 26 May 2022 15 | Pyramids | 0–0 | Future | Cairo |
| 21:00 EST (UTC+2) | | | | Stadium: 30 June Stadium |

| 29 May 2022 21 | Pyramids | 3–1 | Al Masry | Cairo |
| 18:30 EST (UTC+2) | | | | Stadium: 30 June Stadium |

| 22 June 2022 22 | Eastern Company | 0–3 | Pyramids | Suez |
| 19:00 EST (UTC+2) | | | | Stadium: Eastern Company Stadium |

| 29 June 2022 23 | Pyramids | 1–0 | ENPPI | Cairo |
| 19:00 EST (UTC+2) | | | | Stadium: 30 June Stadium |

| 12 July 2022 24 | Tala'ea El Gaish | 2–2 | Pyramids | Cairo |
| 18:30 EST (UTC+2) | | | | Stadium: Gehaz El Reyada Stadium |

| 16 July 2022 25 | Pyramids | 2–0 | Al Ahly | Cairo |
| 21:00 EST (UTC+2) | | | | Stadium: 30 June Stadium |

| 24 July 2022 26 | Ismaily | 0–4 | Pyramids | Ismailia |
| 18:30 EST (UTC+2) | | | | Stadium: Ismailia Stadium |

| 27 July 2022 27 | Pyramids | 1–0 | National Bank of Egypt | Cairo |
| 18:30 EST (UTC+2) | Sobhi 71' | Report | | Stadium: 30 June Stadium; Referee: Amin Omar |

| 1 August 2022 28 | Zamalek | 3–0 | Pyramids | Cairo |
| 21:00 EST (UTC+2) | Zizo 2' (pen.); Jaziri 24'; Shikabala 90+5' | Report | | Stadium: Cairo International Stadium; Referee: Anastasios Sidiropoulos (Greece) |

| 6 August 2022 29 | Pyramids | 1–0 | Al Mokawloon Al Arab | Cairo |
| 21:00 EST (UTC+2) | Samy 49' | Report | | Stadium: 30 June Stadium |

| 9 August 2022 30 | Ghazl El Mahalla | 0–2 | Pyramids | El Mahalla El Kubra |
| 18:30 EST (UTC+2) | | Report | Lakay 3'; Issa 72' | Stadium: El Mahalla Stadium |

| 19 August 2022 31 | Pyramids | 5–1 | Smouha | Cairo |
| 21:00 EST (UTC+2) | El Karti 3'; El Said 53', 73'; Lakay 82' (pen.), 90+3' | Report | Hamdy 12' | Stadium: 30 June Stadium |

| 22 August 2022 32 | Future | 1–0 | Pyramids | Cairo |
| 20:00 EST (UTC+2) | Kamal 70' | Report | | Stadium: Al Salam Stadium; Referee: Mohamed Maarouf |

| 26 August 2022 33 | Ceramica Cleopatra | 0–2 | Pyramids | Cairo |
| 21:00 EST (UTC+2) | | Report | Hamdy 45+2'; Lakay 77' | Stadium: Osman Ahmed Osman Stadium; Referee: Nader Kamar |

| 30 August 2022 34 | Pyramids | 1–3 | El Gouna | Cairo |
| 21:30 EST (UTC+2) | Issa 59' | Report | El Sayed 32' (pen.); El Saadawy 53'; Gahnem 81' | Stadium: 30 June Stadium; Referee: Mohamed Adel |

=== Egypt Cup ===
| 28 March 2022 Round of 32 | Pyramids | 1–0 | La Viena FC | Alexandria |
| 17:00 EST (UTC+2) | Sami 34' | | | Stadium: Haras El Hodoud Stadium |

| 6 July 2022 Round of 16 | Pyramids | 2–1 | Ceramica Cleopatra | Cairo |
| 21:00 EST (UTC+2) | Ben Youssef 17'; Issa 67' | | Magdi 69' | Stadium: 30 June Stadium |

| 27 November 2022 Quarter-finals | National Bank | 0–1 | Pyramids | Cairo |
| 17:00 EST (UTC+2) | | | Sobhi 16' | Stadium: Cairo International Stadium; Referee: Mahmoud Bassiouni |

| 16 January 2023 Semi-finals | Zamalek | 1–1 (a.e.t.) (3–4 p) | Pyramids | Cairo |
| 18:00 EST (UTC+2) | Abdelmaguid 6'; Ashour (yellow card) 21' | Report | Gabr (red card) 11'; Adel (yellow card) 43'; El Karti 55'; Fathy (yellow card) 98' | Stadium: Cairo International Stadium; Referee: Mahmoud El Banna |
| | Penalties |
| | Zizo (penalty missed); Roka (penalty scored); Shalaby (penalty scored); Ashour (penalty scored); Shikabala (penalty missed) | | (penalty scored) Sobhi; (penalty scored) Ben Youssef; (penalty scored) El Gabbas; (penalty scored) Galal |

| 10 April 2023 Final | Al Ahly | 2–1 | Pyramids | Cairo |
| 21:15 EST (UTC+2) | Kahraba 74'; Fathy 105' | | El Karti 71' | Stadium: Cairo International Stadium; Referee: Amin Omar |

=== EFA Cup ===
==== Group stage ====
| 12 January 2022 1 | Pyramids | 1–2 | Al Ittihad | Cairo |
| 17:00 EST (UTC+2) | | | | Stadium: 30 June Stadium |

| 16 January 2022 2 | Future | 2–1 | Pyramids | Cairo |
| 14:30 EST (UTC+2) | | | | Stadium: Al Salam Stadium |

| 20 January 2022 5 | Pyramids | 0–1 | Al Masry | Borg El Arab |
| 14:30 EST (UTC+2) | | | | Stadium: Borg El Arab Stadium |

| 26 January 2022 4 | El Sharqia Dokhan | 1–1 | Pyramids | Cairo |
| 14:30 EST (UTC+2) | | | | Stadium: Petrosport Stadium |

| 30 January 2022 5 | Pyramids | 2–0 | Misr Lel Makkasa | Cairo |
| 21:00 EST (UTC+2) | | | | Stadium: 30 June Stadium |

=== CAF Confederation Cup ===
==== Qualifying rounds ====
The draw for the qualifying rounds was held on 13 August 2021.

===== Second round =====
| 16 October 2021 First leg | Azam (Tanzania) | 0–0 | (Egypt) Pyramids | Mbagala, Tanzania |
| 15:00 UTC+3 | | Report | | Stadium: Chamazi Stadium; Referee: Omar Artan (Somalia) |

| 23 October 2021 Second leg | Pyramids (Egypt) | 1–0 (1–0 agg.) | (Tanzania) Azam | Cairo |
| 21:00 UTC+2 | Gabr 29' | Report | | Stadium: 30 June Stadium; Referee: Georges Gatogato (Burundi) |

===== Play-off round =====
| 28 November 2021 First leg | AS Maniema Union (Democratic Republic of the Congo) | 0–1 | (Egypt) Pyramids | Kinshasa, Congo DR |
| 16:00 UTC+1 | | Report | Wadi 25' | Stadium: Stade des Martyrs; Referee: Belay Tadesse (Ethiopia) |

| 5 December 2021 Second leg | Pyramids (Egypt) | 1–0 (2–0 agg.) | (Democratic Republic of the Congo) AS Maniema Union | Cairo |
| 18:00 UTC+2 | Adel 36' | Report | | Stadium: 30 June Stadium; Referee: Mehdi Abid Charef (Algeria) |

==== Group stage ====
The draw for the group stage was held on 28 December 2021.

| Pos | Team | Pld | W | D | L | GF | GA | GD | Pts | Qualification | AHL | PYR | CSS | ZAN |
|---|---|---|---|---|---|---|---|---|---|---|---|---|---|---|
| 1 | (Libya) Al Ahli Tripoli | 6 | 4 | 1 | 1 | 9 | 5 | +4 | 13 (Note: Head-to-head points: Al Ahli Tripoli 3, Pyramids 3. Head-to-head goal differences: Al Ahli Tripoli 0, Pyramids 0. Head-to-head away goals: Al Ahli Tripoli 1, Pyramids 0) | Advance to knockout stage | — | 1–0 | 2–1 | 2–0 |
| 2 | (Egypt) Pyramids | 6 | 4 | 1 | 1 | 7 | 3 | +4 | 13 | Advance to knockout stage | 2–1 | — | 1–0 | 1–0 |
| 3 | (Tunisia) CS Sfaxien | 6 | 1 | 2 | 3 | 3 | 5 | −2 | 5 | | 0–0 | 1–1 | — | 1–0 |
| 4 | (Zambia) Zanaco | 6 | 1 | 0 | 5 | 3 | 9 | −6 | 3 | | 2–3 | 0–2 | 1–0 | — |

Source: CAF
Rules for classification: Group stage tiebreakers
Notes:

| 13 February 2022 1 | Pyramids (Egypt) | 2–1 | (Libya) Al Ahli Tripoli | Cairo |
| 18:00 UTC+2 | Issa 56'; El Karti 78' | Report | Al-Tubal 21' | Stadium: 30 June Stadium; Referee: Mehdi Abid Charef (Algeria) |

| 20 February 2022 2 | Zanaco (Zambia) | 0–2 | (Egypt) Pyramids | Lusaka, Zambia |
| 15:00 UTC+2 | | Report | Lakay 45+1', 83' | Stadium: National Heroes Stadium; Referee: Pierre Atcho (Gabon) |

| 27 February 2022 3 | Pyramids (Egypt) | 1–0 | (Tunisia) CS Sfaxien | Cairo |
| 18:00 UTC+2 | Gabr 90+3' | Report | | Stadium: 30 June Stadium; Referee: Adil Zourak (Morocco) |

| 13 March 2022 4 | CS Sfaxien (Tunisia) | 1–1 | (Egypt) Pyramids | Tunis, Tunisia |
| 20:00 UTC+1 | Chaouat 54' | Report | El Karti 44' | Stadium: Stade Hammadi Agrebi; Referee: Samuel Uwikunda (Rwanda) |

| 20 March 2022 5 | Al Ahli Tripoli (Libya) | 1–0 | (Egypt) Pyramids | Benghazi, Libya |
| 21:00 UTC+2 | Gaber 54' (o.g.) | Report | | Stadium: Benina Martyrs Stadium; Referee: Mohamed Ali Moussa (Niger) |

| 3 April 2022 6 | Pyramids (Egypt) | 1–0 | (Zambia) Zanaco | Cairo |
| 22:00 UTC+2 | Issa 90' | Report | | Stadium: 30 June Stadium; Referee: Kouassi Attidgbe (Togo) |

==== Knockout stage ====
===== Quarter-finals =====
| 17 April 2022 First leg | Pyramids (Egypt) | 0–0 | (Democratic Republic of the Congo) TP Mazembe | Cairo |
| 22:00 UTC+2 | | Report | | Stadium: 30 June Stadium; Attendance: 5,000; Referee: Dahane Beida (Mauritania) |

| 24 April 2022 Second leg | TP Mazembe (Democratic Republic of the Congo) | 2–0 (2–0 agg.) | (Egypt) Pyramids | Lubumbashi, Congo DR |
| 15:00 UTC+2 | Koffi 33'; Kitambala 44' | Report | | Stadium: Stade TP Mazembe; Attendance: 10,000; Referee: Joshua Bondo (Botswana) |
