= Fiston Mayele =

Congolese footballer (born 1994)

Personal information
- Full name: Mayele Fiston Kalala
- Date of birth: 24 June 1994 (age 32)
- Place of birth: Mbuji-Mayi, DR Congo
- Height: 1.80 m (5 ft 11 in)
- Position: Forward

Team information
- Current team: Al Ahli Tripoli
- Number: 9

Youth career
- Young Leaders
- FC Tshakwiz

Senior career*
Years	Team	Apps	(Gls)
2013–2015	FC Tshakwiz		
2015–2017	JS Likasi	40	(34)
2017–2018	AS Simba		
2019–2021	AS Vita	42	(26)
2021–2023	Young Africans	54	(50)
2023–2026	Pyramids	79	(30)
2026–	Al Ahli Tripoli	0	(0)

International career^{‡}
2021–	DR Congo	40	(7)
- * Club domestic league appearances and goals as of 20 May 2026 ‡ National team caps and goals as of 24 September 2026

Mayele Fiston Kalala (born 24 June 1994), commonly known as Fiston Mayele, is a Congolese professional footballer who plays as a forward for the DR Congo national team.

== Club career ==
=== Early career ===
Aged 11, Mayele began playing youth football for Young Leader during the 2008–09 season. After a one-year break due to injury, Mayele moved to Lubumbashi-based FC Tshakwiz, scoring 17 goals in the third division. In 2015, Mayele joined JS Likasi, where he finished the 2015–16 season with 10 goals and seven assists. The following season he scored 24 goals in the local championship.

After a one season at AS Simba, Mayele moved to AS Vita Club in the Congolese Linafoot league in 2018. In the 2020–21 season, he finished as runner-up on the Linafoot top scorers list.

=== Young Africans ===
On August 1, 2021, he signed a two-year deal with Tanzanian club Young Africans. He quickly became a fan favorite at Young Africans after scoring the decisive goal in his debut match—a Charity Shield clash against arch-rivals Simba SC—played in front of a full-capacity crowd of 60,000 at Benjamin Mkapa National Stadium.

During his time with Young Africans, Mayele delivered outstanding performances, scoring 12 goals in seven matches at one point, including a run of seven goals in six games.

=== Pyramids ===
In 2023, he joined Egyptian side Pyramids. On 30 August 2024, he scored the only goal in a 1–0 victory over ZED in the Egypt Cup final, securing his club's maiden title in all competitions. In the 2025 CAF Champions League final, Mayele made history by scoring the opening goal against Mamelodi Sundowns in the second leg of a 2–1 win, helping his team clinch their first-ever continental title with a 3–2 aggregate victory. He finished the tournament as the top scorer, netting six goals.

On 23 September 2025, he netted a hat-trick for Pyramids in a 3–1 win over Al-Ahli, securing his club's African–Asian–Pacific Cup title. A month later, on 18 October, he scored the only goal in a 1–0 win over RS Berkane in the CAF Super Cup.

== International career ==
In December 2022, Mayele was named in the DR Congo squad for the 2023 Africa Cup of Nations.

On 19 May 2026, he was included in the 26-man squad selected by head coach Sébastien Desabre to represent the DR Congo at the 2026 FIFA World Cup. A month later, on 27 June, he scored his first World Cup goal in a 3–1 victory over Uzbekistan, helping his country secure its first World Cup win and qualification for the knockout stage.

== Personal life ==
Mayele is the fifth son of Anaclet Mayele Kalala, a former footballer who played as a goalkeeper for AS Bantous in the 1980s. He is nicknamed "Monsieur le but" (Mr. Goal) due to his goalscoring prowess.

== Career statistics ==
=== Club ===
As of match played 9 March 2026

Appearances and goals by club, season and competition
Club	Season	League			National cup (Note: Includes Egypt Cup)		Continental		Other		Total	
Club	Season	Division	Apps	Goals	Apps	Goals	Apps	Goals	Apps	Goals	Apps	Goals
Young Africans	2021–22	Tanzanian Premier League	17	17			–				17	17
Young Africans	2022–23	Tanzanian Premier League	13	18			15 (Note: Three appearances and seven goals in CAF Champions League, twelve appearances and seven goals in CAF Confederation Cup)	14			28	32
Young Africans	Total		30	35			15	14			45	49
Pyramids	2023–24	Egyptian Premier League	32	17	4 (Note: Includes one appearance and one goal in the semi-final of the 2022–23 Egypt Cup played on 8 November 2023)	3	5 (Note: Appearances in CAF Champions League)	2	1 (Note: Appearance in Egyptian Super Cup)	0	42	22
Pyramids	2024–25	Egyptian Premier League	23	8	1	1	13	9	1	0	38	18
Pyramids	2025–26	Egyptian Premier League	24	5	3	1	11	4	5 (Note: One appearance in Egyptian Super Cup, one appearance and one goal in CAF Super Cup, three appearances and three goals in FIFA Intercontinental Cup)	4	43	14
Pyramids	Total		79	30	8	5	29	15	7	4	123	54
Career total			109	65	8	5	44	29	7	4	168	103

=== International ===
As of match played 24 September 2026

Appearances and goals by national team and year
National team	Year	Apps	Goals
DR Congo	2021	3	0
DR Congo	2022	0	0
DR Congo	2023	8	2
DR Congo	2024	14	2
DR Congo	2025	10	1
DR Congo	2026	5	2
Total		40	7

Scores and results list DR Congo's goal tally first, score column indicates score after each Mayele goal.

List of international goals scored by Fiston Mayele
No.	Date	Venue	Opponent	Score	Result	Competition
1	18 June 2023	Stade de Franceville, Franceville, Gabon	Gabon	2–0	2–0	2023 Africa Cup of Nations qualification
2	9 September 2023	Stade des Martyrs, Kinshasa, DR Congo	Sudan	2–0	2–0	2023 Africa Cup of Nations qualification
3	6 June 2024	Diamniadio Olympic Stadium, Diamniadio, Senegal	Senegal	1–1	1–1	2026 FIFA World Cup qualification
4	9 September 2024	Benjamin Mkapa Stadium, Dar es Salaam, Tanzania	Ethiopia	2–0	2–0	2025 Africa Cup of Nations qualification
5	25 March 2025	Nouadhibou Municipal Stadium, Nouadhibou, Mauritania	Mauritania	2–0	2–0	2026 FIFA World Cup qualification
6	25 March 2026	Estadio Akron, Guadalajara, Mexico	Bermuda	1–0	2–0	Friendly
7	27 June 2026	Mercedes-Benz Stadium, Atlanta, United States	Uzbekistan	2–1	3–1	2026 FIFA World Cup

== Honours ==
Young Africans

- Tanzanian Premier League: 2021–22, 2022–23
- Tanzania FA Cup : 2021–22, 2022–23
- Tanzania Community Shield : 2021, 2022

Pyramids

- Egypt Cup: 2023–24
- CAF Champions League: 2024–25
- CAF Super Cup: 2025
- FIFA African–Asian–Pacific Cup: 2025

Individual

- CAF Champions League Top scorer: 2024–25
- CAF Confederation Cup Top Scorer: 2022–23
- Tanzanian Premier league MVP: 2022–23
- Tanzanian Premier league Best Goal: 2022–23
- Tanzanian Premier league Top Scorer: 2022–23
- African Inter-Club Player of the Year: 2025
- FIFA Intercontinental Cup top scorer: 2025
