= Blati Touré =

Burkinabé footballer (born 1994)

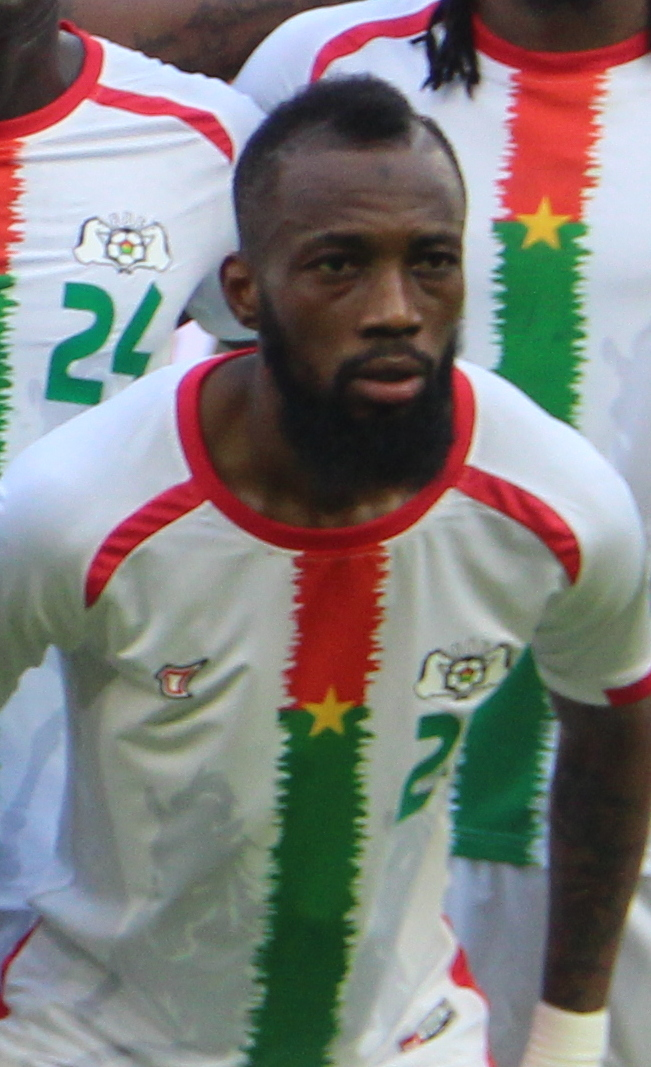
- Touré with Burkina Faso at the 2021 Africa Cup of Nations

Personal information
- Full name: Ibrahim Blati Touré
- Date of birth: 4 August 1994 (age 32)
- Place of birth: Bouaké, Ivory Coast
- Height: 1.71 m (5 ft 7 in)
- Position: Midfielder

Team information
- Current team: Al Ahli Tripoli
- Number: 25

Senior career*
Years	Team	Apps	(Gls)
2013–2014	Rayo Vallecano B	17	(2)
2014–2016	Recreativo B	28	(0)
2015–2016	→ Evian B (loan)	7	(0)
2015–2016	→ Evian (loan)	12	(0)
2016–2018	Omonia	27	(1)
2018	AFC Eskilstuna	16	(0)
2018–2019	Córdoba	22	(0)
2019–2020	Vitória Guimarães	0	(0)
2021–2022	AFC Eskilstuna	22	(0)
2022–2026	Pyramids FC	102	(5)
2026–	Al Ahli Tripoli	0	(0)

International career^{‡}
2017–	Burkina Faso	46	(3)
Medal record
Representing Burkina Faso
Africa Cup of Nations
Third place	2017 Gabon
- * Club domestic league appearances and goals as of 3:15, 09 February 2026 (UTC) ‡ National team caps and goals as of 09 February 2026

Ibrahim Blati Touré (born 4 August 1994) is a Burkinabé professional footballer who plays as a midfielder for the Burkina Faso national team and Al Ahli Tripoli.

== Club career ==
Born in Bouaké, Touré made his senior debut with Rayo Vallecano's reserve team in 2013, in Tercera División. On 3 August 2015, after a one-year spell at Recreativo de Huelva's B-team, he joined Evian Thonon Gaillard on loan for the season.

Touré made his professional debut on 14 August 2015, starting in a 1–1 Ligue 2 away draw against AC Ajaccio. He contributed with 12 appearances during the campaign, as his side suffered relegation.

On 18 July 2016, Touré joined AC Omonia. On 13 March 2018, he switched teams and countries again after agreeing to a contract with AFC Eskilstuna.

On 29 August 2018, Touré returned to Spain after signed a contract with Córdoba CF in Segunda División. The following 11 June, he signed a three-year deal with Primeira Liga side Vitória de Guimarães.

On 29 January 2022, Touré made a return to African football after signing a contract with Pyramids FC in the Egyptian Premier League.

== International career ==
Touré was called up to the Burkina Faso national team for the 2017 Africa Cup of Nations. He made his debut for Burkina Faso in a 2–1 friendly win over Mali. He was featured in the 2021 Africa Cup of Nations held in Cameroon.

== Career statistics ==
=== Club ===
As of match played 5 June 2025

Appearances and goals by club, season and competition
Club	Season	League			National cup (Note: Includes Coupe de France, Copa del Rey, Egypt Cup)		Continental		Other		Total	
Club	Season	Division	Apps	Goals	Apps	Goals	Apps	Goals	Apps	Goals	Apps	Goals
Evian (loan)	2015–16	Ligue 2	12	0	3	1	–		1 (Note: Appearance in Coupe de la Ligue)	0	16	1
Omonia (loan)	2016–17	Cypriot First Division	27	1	–		2 (Note: Appearances in UEFA Europa League)	0	–		29	1
AFC Eskilstuna	2018	Superettan	16	0	–		–		–		16	0
Córdoba	2018–19	Segunda División	22	0	2	0	–		–		24	0
AFC Eskilstuna	2021	Superettan	23	0	–		–		–		23	0
Pyramids	2021–22	Egyptian Premier League	19	0	4	0	6 (Note: Appearances in CAF Confederation Cup)	0	–		29	0
Pyramids	2022–23	Egyptian Premier League	29	3	4	0	10	0	1 (Note: Appearance(s) in Egyptian Super Cup)	0	44	3
Pyramids	2023–24	Egyptian Premier League	28	1	4	1	8 (Note: Appearances in CAF Champions League)	0	–		40	2
Pyramids	2024–25	Egyptian Premier League	21	0	4	1	11	0	2	0	38	1
Pyramids	Total		97	4	16	2	35	0	3	0	151	6
Career total			197	5	21	3	37	0	4	0	259	8

=== International ===
As of match played 24 March 2025

Appearances and goals by national team and year
National team	Year	Apps	Goals
Burkina Faso	2017	10	0
Burkina Faso	2018	5	0
Burkina Faso	2019	4	0
Burkina Faso	2021	4	0
Burkina Faso	2022	13	1
Burkina Faso	2023	7	1
Burkina Faso	2024	10	1
Burkina Faso	2025	1	0
Total		54	3

Scores and results list Burkina Faso goal tally first, score column indicates score after each Touré goal.

International goals by date, venue, cap, opponent, score, result and competition
No.	Date	Venue	Opponent	Score	Result	Competition
1	2 February 2022	Ahmadou Ahidjo Stadium, Yaoundé, Cameroon	Senegal	1–2	1–3	2021 Africa Cup of Nations
2	21 November 2023	Ben M'Hamed El Abdi Stadium, El Jadida, Morocco	Ethiopia	1–0	3–0	2026 FIFA World Cup qualification
3	10 January 2024	Baniyas Stadium, Abu Dhabi, United Arab Emirates	DR Congo	1–0	2–1	Friendly

== Honours ==
Pyramids

- Egypt Cup: 2023–24
- CAF Champions League: 2024–25
- CAF Super Cup: 2025
- FIFA African–Asian–Pacific Cup: 2025

Individual

- Africa Cup of Nations Team of the Tournament: 2021
