= Ahmed Atef (footballer, born 2002) =

Egyptian footballer (born 2002)

Personal information
- Full name: Ahmed Atef El Sayed Mohamed Elsawy
- Date of birth: 19 December 2002 (age 23)
- Height: 1.65 m (5 ft 5 in)
- Position: Winger

Team information
- Current team: Pyramids
- Number: 23

Youth career
- 2008–2020: Al Ahly
- 2020–2022: Pyramids

Senior career*
Years	Team	Apps	(Gls)
2022–	Pyramids	43	(4)
2022–2023	→ El Mokawloon (loan)	26	(0)
2023–2024	→ ZED (loan)	28	(1)

International career
2023–	Egypt U23	14	(0)
- * Club domestic league appearances and goals as of 20:07, 29 October 2026 (UTC)

Ahmed Atef El Sayed (Arabic: احمد عاطف قطة; born 19 December 2002) is an Egyptian professional footballer who plays as a winger for Pyramids.

== Club career ==
Atef joined the academy of Al Ahly as a child, but was released after twelve years due to his small size. He moved to fellow Egyptian Premier League side Pyramids, before being loaned to El Mokawloon in October 2022. His career with El Mokawloon started well, and he earned a Man of the Match award against Smouha in March 2023. At the end of the 2022–23 season, Atef returned to Pyramids.

Despite attempts by El Mokawloon to have Atef return to the club the following season, Atef instead joined ZED. He earned plaudits in Egyptian media for another Man of the Match performance against Smouha in May 2024.

== International career ==
Atef was called up to the Egypt under-23 side in June 2023 for the 2023 U-23 Africa Cup of Nations. He was called up again for the 2024 Summer Olympics in Paris.

== Personal life ==
While in the academy of Al Ahly, Atef was given the nickname Cat by teammate Ahmed Sayed Gharib, as he would often sing the theme song of Mohamed Barakat's TV show, which included a line about the former Egyptian international footballer buying a cat.

== Career statistics ==
=== Club ===
As of match played 1 June 2025

Appearances and goals by club, season and competition
Club	Season	League			Egypt Cup		League Cup		Continental		Other		Total	
Club	Season	Division	Apps	Goals	Apps	Goals	Apps	Goals	Apps	Goals	Apps	Goals	Apps	Goals
Pyramids	2021–22	Egyptian Premier League	0	0	0	0	1	0	–		–		1	0
Pyramids	2022–23	Egyptian Premier League	0	0	0	0	0	0	–		–		0	0
Pyramids	2023–24	Egyptian Premier League	0	0	0	0	0	0	–		–		0	0
Pyramids	2024–25	Egyptian Premier League	20	3	5	3	2	0	11 (Note: Appearances in CAF Champions League)	1	1 (Note: Appearance in Egypt Super Cup)	0	39	7
Pyramids	Total		20	3	5	3	3	0	11	1	1	0	40	7
El Mokawloon (loan)	2022–23	Egyptian Premier League	26	0	0	0	0	0	–		–		26	0
ZED (loan)	2023–24	Egyptian Premier League	28	1	4	0	1	0	–		–		33	1
Career total			74	4	9	3	4	0	11	1	1	0	99	8

== Honours ==
Pyramids

- CAF Champions League: 2024–25
- CAF Super Cup: 2025
- FIFA African–Asian–Pacific Cup: 2025
