= Ibrahim Adel =

Egyptian footballer (born 2001)

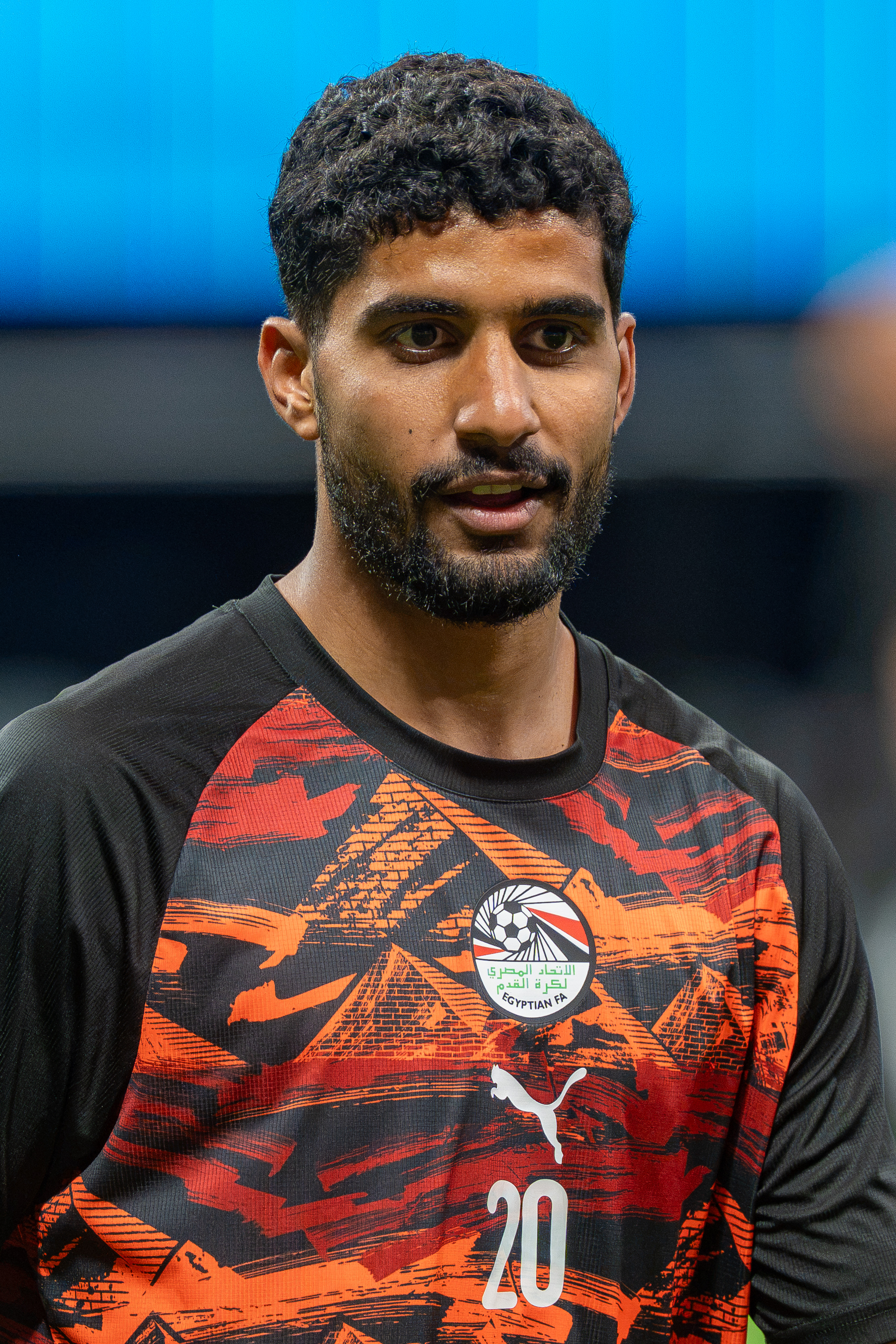
- Adel with Egypt in 2026

Personal information
- Full name: Ibrahim Adel Aly Mohamed Hassan
- Date of birth: 23 April 2001 (age 25)
- Place of birth: Port Said, Egypt
- Height: 1.78 m (5 ft 10 in)
- Position: Left winger

Team information
- Current team: Nordsjælland
- Number: 14

Youth career
- El Merreikh
- 2018–2019: Pyramids

Senior career*
Years	Team	Apps	(Gls)
2019–2025	Pyramids	127	(36)
2025–2026	Al Jazira	11	(0)
2026	→ Nordsjælland (loan)	11	(3)
2026–	Nordsjælland	11	(1)

International career^{‡}
2019–2021	Egypt U20	1	(1)
2021	Egypt U23	6	(1)
2021–	Egypt	27	(4)
Medal record
Representing Egypt
U-23 Africa Cup of Nations
Runner-up	Morocco 2023	U-23 Team
- * Club domestic league appearances and goals as of 18 October 2026 ‡ National team caps and goals as of 29 September 2026

Ibrahim Adel Aly Mohamed Hassan (Note: Arabic: إبراهيم عادل علي محمد حسن) (born 23 April 2001) is an Egyptian professional footballer who plays as a left winger for Danish Superliga club Nordsjælland and the Egypt national team.

== Career ==
Ibrahim Adel had attracted interest from European clubs, particularly Getafe, with a potential move to the Spanish side collapsing at the final stage despite the player completing his medical. He continued to impress with Pyramids, recording 15 goals and 12 assists in 35 appearances during the season. Since joining the club from El Merreikh of Port Said, he had made a combined youth/senior 169 appearances, scoring 48 goals and providing 23 assists. During his time at Pyramids, Adel played a key role as the club won both the Egypt Cup and CAF Champions League in consecutive seasons, securing each trophy for the first time in its history.

On 22 July 2025, Ibrahim Adel joined Al Jazira club for a fee of 5 million dollars.

On 2 February 2026, Danish Superliga side Nordsjælland announced the signing of Adel on a loan-deal for the rest of the season, with an option to make it permanent.

On 15 May 2026, the deal was made permanent, with Adel signing af contract until June 2029.

== International career ==
Ibrahim Adel represented Egypt at both the Tokyo and Paris Olympics, scoring three goals at the latter and becoming the only Egyptian player under 23 to appear at two Olympic Games. Ibrahim Adel played for the senior team scoring twice, including a long-range effort against Mauritania that helped secure qualification for the 2025 Africa Cup of Nations.

On 2 December 2025, Adel was called up to the Egypt squad for the 2025 Africa Cup of Nations.

Ibrahim Adel was included in the Egyptian squad for the 2026 World Cup. He played 1 game in the tournament coming in as a substitute in the 88th minute vs Belgium in which the game was and ended 1-1.

== Career statistics ==
=== Club ===
As of match played 15 November 2026

Appearances and goals by club, season and competition
Club	Season	League			Cup		League Cup		Continental		Other		Total	
Club	Season	Division	Apps	Goals	Apps	Goals	Apps	Goals	Apps	Goals	Apps	Goals	Apps	Goals
Pyramids	2018–19	Egyptian Premier League	1	0	—		—		—		—		1	0
Pyramids	2019–20	Egyptian Premier League	16	1	2	0	—		2 (Note: Appearances in CAF Confederation Cup)	0	—		20	1
Pyramids	2020–21	Egyptian Premier League	19	10	1	0	—		7	4	—		27	14
Pyramids	2021–22	Egyptian Premier League	21	6	2	0	1	0	9	1	—		33	7
Pyramids	2022–23	Egyptian Premier League	22	4	1	0	0	0	7	0	1 (Note: Appearance in Egyptian Super Cup)	0	31	4
Pyramids	2023–24	Egyptian Premier League	17	7	1	0	1	0	4 (Note: Appearances in CAF Champions League)	0	0	0	23	7
Pyramids	2024–25	Egyptian Premier League	31	8	3	0	1	0	8	6	2	1	45	15
Pyramids	Total		127	36	10	0	3	0	30	11	3	1	173	48
Al Jazira	2025–26	UAE Pro League	8	0	0	0	3	0	—		—		11	0
Nordsjælland (loan)	2025–26	Danish Superliga	11	3	—		—		—		—		11	3
Nordsjælland	2026–27	Danish Superliga	14	4	1	0	—		7 (Note: Appearances in UEFA Conference League)	2	—		22	6
Career total			160	43	11	0	6	0	44	13	3	1	224	57

=== International ===
As of match played 29 September 2026

Appearances and goals by national team and year
National team	Year	Apps	Goals
Egypt	2021	1	0
Egypt	2022	3	0
Egypt	2023	2	0
Egypt	2024	8	2
Egypt	2025	5	1
Egypt	2026	8	1
Total		27	4

Scores and results list Egypt's goal tally first, score column indicates score after each Adel goal.

List of international goals scored by Ibrahim Adel
No.	Date	Venue	Opponent	Score	Result	Competition	Ref.
1	6 September 2024	Cairo International Stadium, Cairo, Egypt	Cape Verde	3–0	3–0	2025 Africa Cup of Nations qualification	
2	15 October 2024	Cheikha Ould Boïdiya Stadium, Nouakchott, Mauritania	Mauritania	1–0	1–0	2025 Africa Cup of Nations qualification	
3	8 October 2025	Larbi Zaouli Stadium, Casablanca, Morocco	Djibouti	1–0	3–0	2026 FIFA World Cup qualification	
4	29 September 2026	Juba Stadium, Juba, South Sudan	South Sudan	3–0	5–0	2027 Africa Cup of Nations qualification	

== Honours ==
Pyramids

- Egypt Cup: 2023–24
- CAF Champions League: 2024–25
