= Mohamed Sadek (footballer, born 1997) =

Egyptian footballer

Personal information
- Full name: Mohamed Abdulmeniem Sadek
- Date of birth: 6 July 1997 (age 29)
- Place of birth: Ismailia, Egypt
- Height: 1.76 m (5 ft 9 in)
- Position: Attacking midfielder

Team information
- Current team: Pyramids

Youth career
- 2011–2015: El Qanah

Senior career*
Years	Team	Apps	(Gls)
2014–2017	El Qanah	42	(12)
2017–2022	Ismaily	98	(4)
2022–2024	Pyramids	24	(0)
2023–2024	→ Modern Sport (loan)	30	(2)
2024–	Ceramica Cleopatra		

International career
2019	Egypt U23	1	(0)
- * Club domestic league appearances and goals

Mohamed Abdulmeniem Sadek (Arabic: محمد عبدالمنعم صادق; born 6 July 1997) is an Egyptian professional footballer who plays as a winger for Egyptian Premier League club Ceramica Cleopatra.

== Club career ==
Sadek started his youth then senior career with El Qanah. He was noted to be a key player for the team.

On 6 July 2017, Sadek transferred to Ismaily on a five-year contract, with El Qanah receiving a transfer fee of E£2 million (approx. US$128,000). He scored his first goal with Ismaily in a match against El Raja SC on December 27, 2017, which ended in a 5–0 win for Ismaily SC.

== Honours ==
Egypt U23

- Africa U-23 Cup of Nations: 2019
