= Sodiq Awujoola =

Nigerian footballer (born 2000)

Personal information
- Full name: Sodiq Olamilekan Awujoola (Note: Also spelt Sodiq Olamilekan Ougola.)
- Date of birth: 10 November 2000 (age 25)
- Place of birth: Shaki, Oyo, Nigeria
- Height: 1.76 m (5 ft 9 in)
- Position: Winger

Team information
- Current team: Ceramica Cleopatra
- Number: 11

Youth career
- Shooting Stars

Senior career*
| Years | Team | Apps | (Gls) |
| 2019–2021 | Shooting Stars | | |
| 2021–2023 | Smouha | 48 | (11) |
| 2023– | Ceramica Cleopatra | 39 | (16) |
| 2024–2025 | → Pyramids FC (loan) | 16 | (3) |
- * Club domestic league appearances and goals as of 06:00, 25 December 2025 (UTC)

Sodiq Olamilekan Awujoola (born 10 November 2000) is a Nigerian professional footballer who plays as a winger for Egyptian Premier League team Ceramica Cleopatra.

Awujoola was among the squad that won the 2024–25 CAF Champions League with Pyramids FC of Egypt while on loan with them from Ceramica Cleopatra. He returned to his parent club Ceramica Cleopatra in June 2025 after Pyramids did not activate the $2 million buyout clause in the loan agreement.
