= Abdallah Magdy =

Egyptian footballer (born 1997)

Personal information
- Date of birth: February 22, 1997 (age 29)
- Place of birth: Egypt
- Position: Midfielder

Team information
- Current team: Pyramids FC
- Number: 20

Senior career*
Years	Team	Apps	(Gls)
2019-2021	Misr Lel Makkasa SC	37	(1)
2021-25	Pyramids FC	27	(1)
2023-24	ZED FC (Loan)	22	(0)
2024-25	Ceramica Cleopatra FC (Loan)	12	(2)
2025-	Ceramica Cleopatra FC	0	(0)
- * Club domestic league appearances and goals

Abdallah Magdy is an Egyptian footballer who plays for the Egyptian Premier League side Ceramica Cleopatra as a midfielder.

== Biography ==
Abdallah Magdy was born on February 22, 1997, in Egypt. He played for Misr Lel Makkasa from 2019 to 2021 when he was transferred to Pyramids.

== Trophies ==
He was in the runner up team that won the 2022 Egyptian Premier League.
