= Karim Hafez =

Egyptian footballer (born 1996)

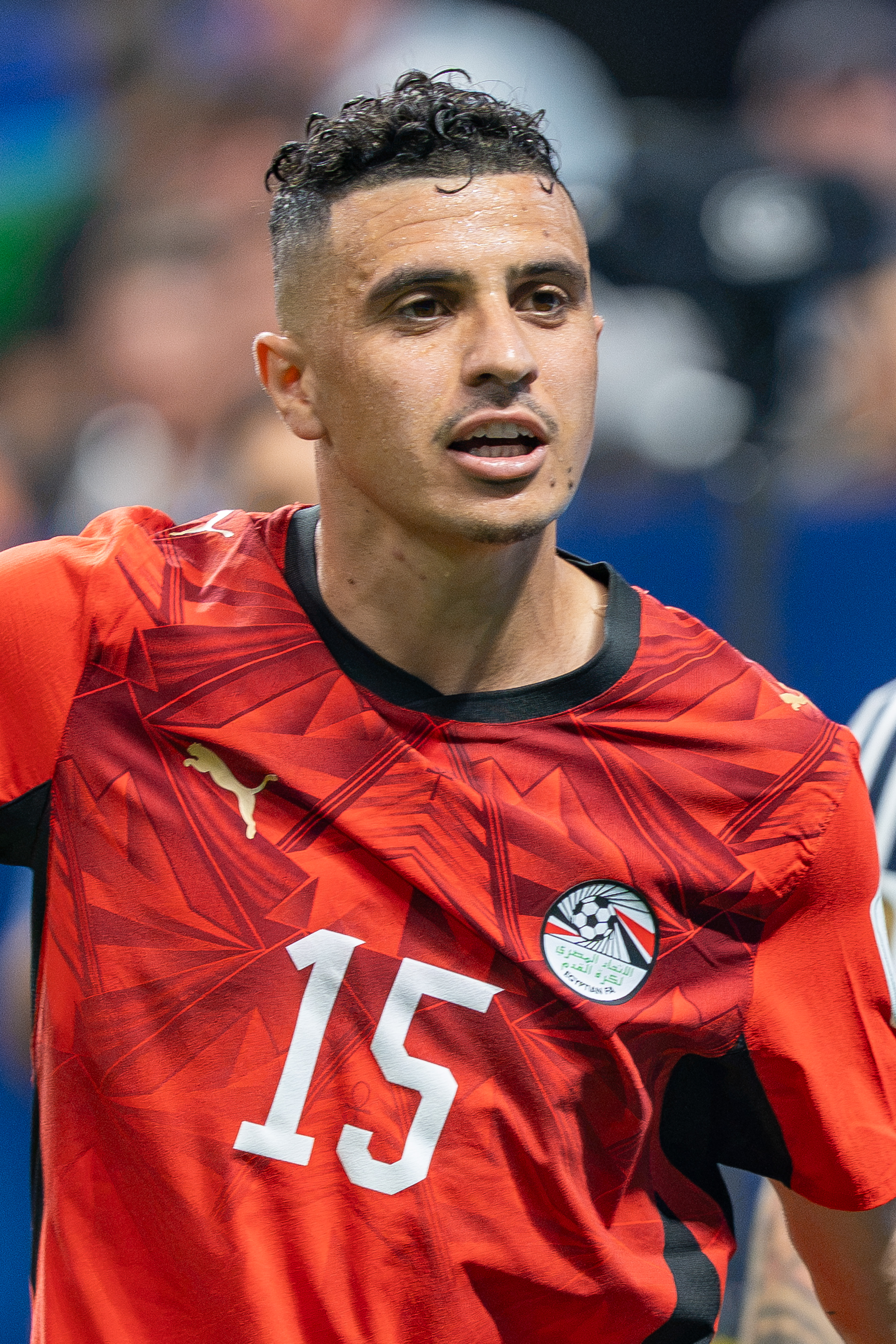
- Hafez with Egypt in 2026

Personal information
- Full name: Karim Hafez Ramadan Seifeldin
- Date of birth: 12 March 1996 (age 30)
- Place of birth: Beheira, Egypt
- Height: 1.75 m (5 ft 9 in)
- Position: Left back

Team information
- Current team: Pyramids
- Number: 29

Senior career*
Years	Team	Apps	(Gls)
2014–2018	Lierse	23	(2)
2015–2016	→ Omonia (loan)	29	(0)
2016–2017	→ Lens (loan)	23	(0)
2017–2018	→ Lens (loan)	43	(2)
2018–2020	Wadi Degla	0	(0)
2018–2019	→ Başakşehir (loan)	1	(0)
2019–2020	→ Kasımpaşa (loan)	26	(0)
2020	→ Yeni Malatyaspor (loan)	13	(0)
2020–2022	Yeni Malatyaspor	64	(0)
2022–	Pyramids	79	(3)

International career^{‡}
2015–	Egypt	12	(0)
- * Club domestic league appearances and goals ‡ National team caps and goals as of 7 July 2026

Karim Hafez Ramadan Seifeldin (Note: Arabic: كريم حافظ رمضان سيف الدين) (born 12 March 1996) is an Egyptian professional footballer who plays for Egyptian Premier League club Pyramids and the Egypt national team as a left-back.

== Club career ==
Hafez made his top flight debut with Belgian club Lierse S.K. on 30 August 2014 against Waasland-Beveren in a 2–0 away defeat. On 20 September 2014, he scored his first league goal against K.V.C. Westerlo in a 6–1 away defeat. Hafez continued to play for Lierse's senior side and was one of their star performers, scoring three goals in the Jupiler Pro League but could not save his club from relegation. Because of his excellent individual play, he was called up to the Egyptian national team by their Argentine manager Héctor Cúper and made his debut for the Pharaohs in June, coming off the bench in a 2–1 friendly win against Malawi.

Maged Sami, the owner of both Wadi Degla and Lierse, traveled to Athens to negotiate the transfer of Hafez to AEK Athens, and an agreement was expected to be reached over several days in which the 19-year-old Egypt left-back would join the eleven-time Greek champions on loan for a season, with the option to extend the loan for two additional seasons, according to Lierse announcement on their official website. However, the move took a negative turn because of two disagreements. First, Wadi Degla sought the option of first choice if Hafez should be sold because of an offer by another club. Second, they wanted to be paid about €500,000 if AEK were to qualify for the Champions League in the 2016–17 season. The disagreements regarding the transfer were augmented when Lierse announced the transfer on their official website before it was final, which AEK Athens did not take kindly to. The deal collapsed.

Hafez then played for the French club RC Lens on loan from Lierse.

On 29 August 2018, Hafez was loaned by Wadi Degla to the Turkish club İstanbul Başakşehir for the season.

== International career ==
In May 2018 he was named in Egypt's preliminary squad for the 2018 World Cup in Russia, but he wasn't selected for the final squad.

In May of 2026 he was named in the final 26 man squad for Egypt in the 2026 World Cup.

== Honours ==
Pyramids

- Egypt Cup: 2023–24
- CAF Champions League: 2024–25
- FIFA African–Asian–Pacific Cup: 2025
