= Ahmed Samy =

Egyptian footballer (born 1992)

Ahmed Samy أَحْمَد سَامِي
Personal information
- Full name: Ahmed Samy Saad Abou El Einain
- Date of birth: 1 April 1992 (age 34)
- Place of birth: El Beheira, Egypt
- Height: 1.84 m (6 ft 0 in)
- Position: Centre-back

Team information
- Current team: Pyramids
- Number: 4

Youth career
- 2003–2007: El Khatib Football Academy
- 2007–2009: Al Nasr

Senior career*
Years	Team	Apps	(Gls)
2009–2012	Al Nasr		
2012–2013	Al Ittihad Alexandria Club	1	(0)
2013–2014	Telephonat Beni Suef	18	(1)
2014–2020	Misr Lel Makkasa	113	(4)
2018–2020	→ Tala'ea El Gaish (loan)	44	(3)
2020–	Pyramids	127	(7)

International career^{‡}
2023–	Egypt	1	(0)
- * Club domestic league appearances and goals as of 06 December 2025 ‡ National team caps and goals as of 28 August 2024

Ahmed Samy Saad Abou El Einain (Egyptian Arabic: أَحْمَد سَامِي سَعْد أَبُو الْعَيْنَيْن, born 1 April 1992) is an Egyptian footballer who plays for Pyramids as a centre-back and the Egypt national team.

== Club career ==
=== Early career ===
Samy started his career at El Khatib Football Academy, after playing well and showing great discipline in the Pepsi Schools League. Before participating in the Pepsi Schools League he had a trial with Egyptian giants Al Ahly youth team, but failed to pass all tests because of an injury. After staying with El Khatib Football Academy for almost 4 years, he was signed by Al Nasr at the age of 15.

=== Al Nasr ===
Samy played 2 seasons with the reserve team before being promoted to the first team in 2009, which was playing in the Egyptian Second Division at that time. He helped the club in reaching the quarter-final of Egypt Cup during the 2010–11 season for the first time in the club's history, but they were eliminated in that round by defending champions Haras El Hodoud after losing 0–1 at extra time. Because of his great performance with the club, Telephonat Beni Suef announced the signing of the player for an undisclosed fee.

=== Telephonat Beni Suef ===
On 1 July 2012, Samy was transferred to newly promoted team Telephonat Beni Suef. This was considered as the first season for the club at the Egyptian Premier League, because after the club gained promotion to the 2011–12 Egyptian Premier League by winning the 2010–11 Egyptian Second Division, the season was suspended in February 2012 and all league results were halted due to the incidents that occurred during the Port Said Stadium riot.

The next season, 2011–12 Egyptian Premier League, wasn't much different; as the Egyptian Premier League, alongside all other sport-related activities in Egypt, were cancelled and all results were halted in July 2013 for security reasons due to the 2013 Egyptian coup d'état.

Things became a bit stable 2013–14 Egyptian Premier League, but because the season started on 26 December 2013 the Egyptian Football Association decided to split the teams in two groups to make sure that the season will end in July 2014. Samy had a decent season with club, he scored 1 goal and missed only 3 matches in the season. The club finished 9th in Group B and lost the relegation play-off against El Raja and were relegated to the Egyptian Second Division. A lot of clubs wanted to sign Samy after the season ended, including Al Ahly, Ismaily and Misr Lel Makkasa. After Ehab Galal, who managed Telephonat Beni Suef in the 2013–14 season, was appointed as manager of Misr Lel Makkasa; Samy ended up joining Misr Lel Makkasa too after he was convinced by Galal to join him with his new club.

=== Misr Lel Makkasa ===
On 3 August 2014, Misr Lel Makkasa completed the signing of Samy in a 3-year contract alongside some of his teammates at Telephonat Beni Suef, including future club star Ahmed El Sheikh. Samy made his official debut in the first match of the 2014–15 Egyptian Premier League season in a 2–1 win against El Raja, playing the full 90 minutes in that match. Samy became an important player in the team quickly, and played 35 official matches in his first season with the club, including 32 in the league. After a great first season, the club finished fourth in the league and qualified for the 2016 CAF Confederation Cup, their first ever appearance in an African competition.

Samy maintained his first-eleven place for the 2015–16 Egyptian Premier League after gaining his manager's trust after his performance in the previous season. In the 2015–16 season he played 29 league matches and scored 2 goals, against Ittihad El Shorta in a 1–1 draw in the first match of the season and against league champions Al Ahly in a 0–1 away win. Despite his performance, the club didn't do well in local competitions as they finished 10th in the league and got eliminated from the 2015–16 Egypt Cup in the Round of 32 by Egyptian Second Division side FC Masr. The club reached the Play-off round in the 2016 CAF Confederation Cup after beating Defence Force of Ethiopia, CS Don Bosco of DR Congo and CS Constantine of Algeria in the Preliminary round, First round and Second round respectively; but failed to make it to the group stage as they were eliminated by Al Ahli Tripoli of Libya after the Libyan club won on away goals.

Samy played only 24 league matches in the 2016–17 Egyptian Premier League season due to suspension and a foot injury; but he maintained his good performance in both centre-back and defensive midfielder positions and helped his club to finish the league in the 2nd place and to qualify for the 2018 CAF Champions League for the first time in the club history. Al Ahly made a bid for Samy at the end of the season, but the club refused the offer and renewed his contract.

On 3 March 2017, during Misr Lel Makkasa and Zamalek league match, Samy made controversies after he cleared a cross from a free-kick with his hand. All Zamalek players ran to the referee asking for a penalty, but the international referee Gehad Grisha didn't give it because he didn't see it and gave a corner instead. The match ended as a 1–0 win for Misr Lel Makkasa.

Samy was announced as the club's new captain for the 2017–18 Egyptian Premier League season, after spending more than 3 years with the club. Many important players left Misr Lel Makkasa after the club announced the departure of coach Ehab Galal, as left the club by mutual consent; players including top goalscorer Ahmed El Sheikh, playmakers Hussein El Shahat and Emad Fathy and goalkeeper Ahmed Masoud; which led to instability in the team.

On 30 December 2017, Samy alongside other players from the Egyptian Premier League and other Arab leagues played for Al Ahly against Atlético Madrid in a friendly match under the slogan "Peace Against Terrorism" at Borg El Arab Stadium in Alexandria. The match ended 3–2 for Atlético Madrid.

=== Tala'ea El Gaish (loan) ===
Samy joined Tala'ea El Gaish on loan for two years.

=== Pyramids ===
In November 2020, Samy signed for Pyramids on a four-year deal.

== International career ==
Samy received his first call-up in 2017 when he was called to play two non-official matches with the national team against Yemen on 13 May 2017 and against Libya on 5 June 2017. On 16 November 2023, he made his full debut against Djibouti in a 6–0 win.

== Career statistics ==
=== Club ===
As of match played 26 January 2025

Appearances and goals by club, season and competition
Club	Season	League			National cup (Note: Includes Egypt Cup)		Continental		Other		Total	
Club	Season	Division	Apps	Goals	Apps	Goals	Apps	Goals	Apps	Goals	Apps	Goals
Al Nasr	2009-10	Egyptian Second Division	—		1	0	—		0	0	1	0
Al Nasr	2010-11	Egyptian Second Division	—		0	0	—		0	0	3	0
Al Nasr	Total		0	0	4	0	0	0	0	0	4	0
Telephonat Beni Suef	2013-14	Egyptian Premier League	18	1	0	0	—		0	0	18	1
Telephonat Beni Suef	Total		18	1	0	0	0	0	0	0	18	1
Misr lel-Makassa	2014-15	Egyptian Premier League	32	0	3	0	0	0	0	0	32	3
Misr lel-Makassa	2015-16	Egyptian Premier League	29	2	1	0	0	0	0	0	30	1
Misr lel-Makassa	2016-17	Egyptian Premier League	24	0	1	0	0	0	0	0	25	0
Misr lel-Makassa	2017-18	Egyptian Premier League	28	2	2	0	0	0	0	0	30	2
Misr lel-Makassa	Total		113	4	7	0	0	0	0	0	120	4
Tala'ea El Gaish (loan)	2018-19	Egyptian Premier League	27	1	0	0	0	0	0	0	27	1
Tala'ea El Gaish (loan)	2019-20	Egyptian Premier League	17	2	0	0	0	0	0	0	17	2
Tala'ea El Gaish (loan)	Total		44	3	0	0	0	0	0	0	44	3
Pyramids	2020-21	Egyptian Premier League	30	2	2	0	10 (Note: Appearance(s) in the CAF Confederation Cup)	0	0	0	42	2
Pyramids	2021-22	Egyptian Premier League	15	2	5	1	11	0	2 (Note: Appearacne(s) in the Egyptian League Cup)	0	33	3
Pyramids	2022-23	Egyptian Premier League	24	0	3	0	6	1	2 (Note: Appearance(s) in the Egyptian Super Cup and Egyptian League Cup)	0	35	1
Pyramids	2023-24	Egyptian Premier League	29	3	4	1	6 (Note: Appearance(s) in the CAF Champions League)	0	3	0	42	4
Pyramids	2024-25	Egyptian Premier League	6	0	0	0	6	0	1 (Note: Appearance(s) in the Egyptian Super Cup)	0	13	0
Pyramids	Total		104	7	14	2	33	1	8	0	157	10
Career Total			279	15	25	2	33	1	8	0	343	18

== Honours ==
Pyramids

- Egypt Cup: 2023–24
- CAF Champions League: 2024–25
- CAF Super Cup: 2025
- FIFA African–Asian–Pacific Cup: 2025
