= Ali Gabr =

Egyptian footballer (born 1989)

Ali Gabr عَلِيّ جَبْر
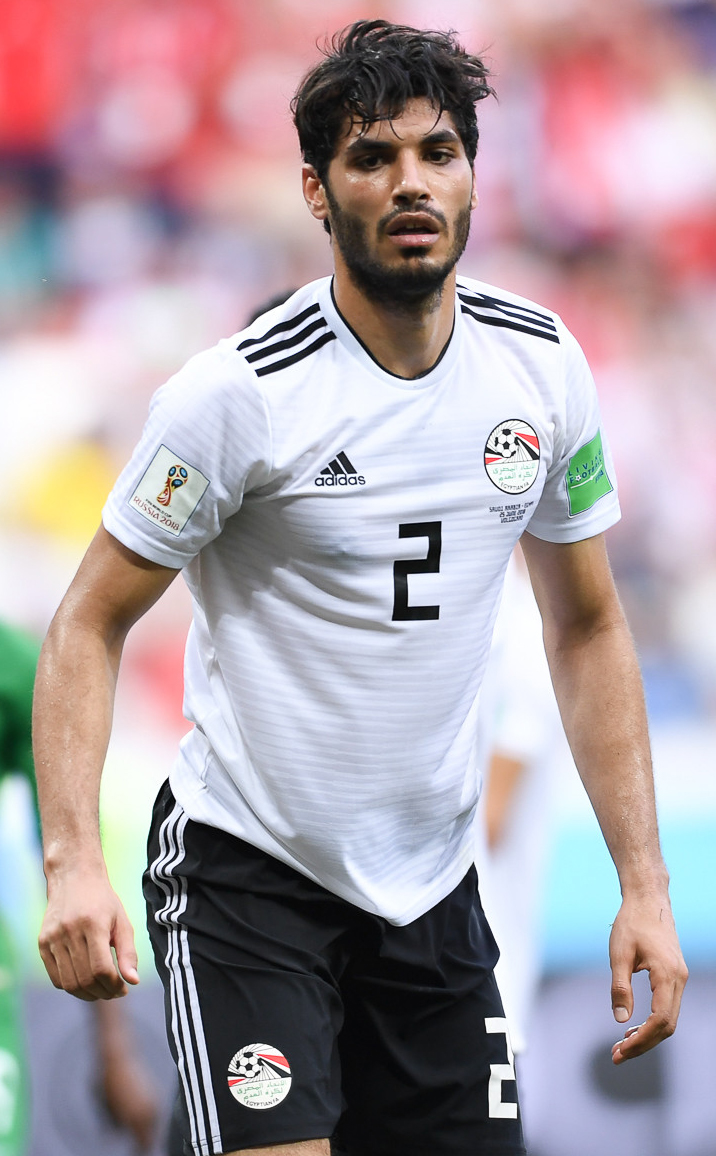
- Ali Gabr with Egypt at the 2018 FIFA World Cup.

Personal information
- Full name: Ali Gabr Gabr Mossad
- Date of birth: 10 January 1989 (age 37)
- Place of birth: Tanta, Egypt
- Height: 1.93 m (6 ft 4 in)
- Position: Centre-back

Youth career
- Ismaily

Senior career*
Years	Team	Apps	(Gls)
2007–2012	Ismaily	3	(0)
2012–2014	Al Ittihad	29	(0)
2014–2018	Zamalek	130	(4)
2018	→ West Bromwich Albion (loan)	0	(0)
2018–2026	Pyramids	150	(14)

International career^{‡}
2010	Egypt U23	1	(0)
2014–2024	Egypt	40	(1)
Medal record
Representing Egypt
Runner-up	2017 Gabon
- * Club domestic league appearances and goals as of 02:38, 17 July 2026 (UTC) ‡ National team caps and goals as of 17 July 2026 (UTC)

Ali Gabr Gabr Mossad (Arabic: عَلِيّ جَبْر جَبْر مُسْعَد; born 10 January 1989) is an Egyptian professional footballer who plays for the Egyptian national team as a centre-back.

== Club career ==
=== Zamalek SC ===
Gabr signed for Zamalek in June 2014. His performances resulted in his selection for the Egyptian national team. Zamalek won the Egyptian Premier league 2014–15.

=== West Bromwich Albion ===
On 29 January 2018, Gabr joined West Bromwich Albion on a six-month loan deal worth €500,000 with a €2.5 million option to buy at the end of the season with Zamalek retaining a 10% sell-on clause.

=== Pyramids ===
On 10 July 2018, Gabr joined Pyramids after West Bromwich turned down the option to sign the defender on a permanent deal.

== International career ==
He was called up for the national team under Shawky Gharib on 4 June 2014 in a friendly game against Jamaica.

In May 2018, Gabr was named in Egypt's squad for the 2018 World Cup in Russia.

== Career statistics ==
=== Club ===
As of match played 10 March 2024

Appearances and goals by club, season and competition
Club	Season	League			National cup (Note: Includes Egypt Cup, Egyptian League Cup)		Continental		Other		Total	
Club	Season	Division	Apps	Goals	Apps	Goals	Apps	Goals	Apps	Goals	Apps	Goal
Ismaily SC	2009-10	Egyptian Premier League	2	0	—		—		—		2	0
Ismaily SC	2010-11	Egyptian Premier League	1	0	—		—		—		1	0
Ismaily SC	Total		3	0	0	0	0	0	0	0	3	0
Al Ittihad	2012-13	Egyptian Premier League	13	0	2	0	—		—		15	0
Al Ittihad	2013-14	Egyptian Premier League	14	0	—		—		—		14	0
Al Ittihad	Total		27	0	2	0	0	0	0	0	29	0
Zamalek SC	2014-15	Egyptian Premier League	33	1	4	0	—		1 (Note: Appearance(s) in Egyptian Super Cup)	0	38	1
Zamalek SC	2015-16	Egyptian Premier League	26	0	4	1	9 (Note: Appearance(s) in CAF Champions League)	0	1	0	40	1
Zamalek SC	2016-17	Egyptian Premier League	25	2	3	0	8	0	1	0	37	2
Zamalek SC	2017-18	Egyptian Premier League	15	0	—		—		—		15	0
Zamalek SC	Total		99	3	11	1	17	0	3	0	130	4
West Bromwich Albion (loan)	2017-18	Premier League	0	0	—		—		—		0	0
Pyramids FC	2018-19	Egyptian Premier League	27	3	4	0	—		—		31	3
Pyramids FC	2019-20	Egyptian Premier League	23	1	2	0	10 (Note: Appearance(s) in CAF Confederation Cup)	1	—		35	2
Pyramids FC	2020-21	Egyptian Premier League	20	2	3	0	10	0	—		33	2
Pyramids FC	2021-22	Egyptian Premier League	32	3	3	0	10	2	—		45	5
Pyramids FC	2022-23	Egyptian Premier League	26	1	3	0	12	1	1	0	42	2
Pyramids FC	2023-24	Egyptian Premier League	4	0	1	0	5	0	—		10	0
Career Total			261	13	29	1	64	3	4	0	358	15

=== International ===
As of match played 7 January 2024

Appearances and goals by national team and year
National team	Year	Apps	Goals
Egypt	2014	2	0
Egypt	2015	1	0
Egypt	2016	6	1
Egypt	2017	9 (Note: Six appearances in Africa Cup of Nations)	0
Egypt	2018	8 (Note: Three appearances in FIFA World Cup)	0
Egypt	2019	1	0
Egypt	2020	0	0
Egypt	2021	2	0
Egypt	2022	2	0
Egypt	2023	8	0
Egypt	2024	1	0
Total		40	1

List of international goals scored by Ali Gabr
No.	Date	Venue	Opponent	Score	Result	Competition
1	29 January 2016	Aswan Stadium, Aswan, Egypt	Libya	2-0	2-0	Friendly

== Honours ==
Zamalek

- Egyptian Premier League: 2014–15
- Egypt Cup: 2014–15, 2015–16
- Egyptian Super Cup: 2016

Egypt

- Africa Cup of Nations: Runner-up 2017

Pyramids

- Egypt Cup: 2023–24
- CAF Champions League: 2024–25
- CAF Super Cup: 2025
- FIFA African–Asian–Pacific Cup: 2025
