= Marwan Hamdy =

Egyptian footballer (born 1996)

Personal information
- Full name: Marwan Hamdy Mehany Abdelhamid
- Date of birth: 15 November 1996 (age 29)
- Height: 1.84 m (6 ft 0 in)
- Position: Striker

Team information
- Current team: Pyramids FC
- Number: 19

Senior career*
Years	Team	Apps	(Gls)
2016–2019	Misr Lel Makkasa SC	18	(2)
2019–2020	Wadi Degla S.C.	26	(6)
2020–2020	Misr Lel Makkasa SC	7	(4)
2020–2021	Zamalek	18	(1)
2021–2022	Smouha SC	33	(15)
2022–2024	Al Masry SC	30	(7)
2024–	Pyramids FC	10	(0)

International career^{‡}
2020–	Egypt	11	(1)
Medal record
Representing Egypt
Men's football
Africa Cup of Nations
Runner-up	2021 Cameroon
- * Club domestic league appearances and goals as of 30 May 2024 ‡ National team caps and goals as of 14 October 2023

Marwan Hamdy Mehany Abdelhamid (Arabic: مروان حمدي مهني عبد الحميد; born 15 November 1996) is an Egyptian professional footballer who plays as a striker for Egyptian Premier League club Pyramids FC and the Egypt national team.

== International career ==
He made his debut for the Egypt national football team in the 2021 Africa Cup of Nations qualification against Comoros away on 18 November 2019.

=== International goals ===
No	Date	Venue	Opponent	Score	Result	Competition
1.	11 December 2021	Al Janoub Stadium, Al Wakrah, Qatar	Jordan	1–1	3–1 (a.e.t.)	2021 FIFA Arab Cup
2.	6 December 2025	Lusail Stadium, Lusail, Qatar	United Arab Emirates	1–1	1–1	2025 FIFA Arab Cup

== Honours ==
- Zamalek
  - Egyptian Premier League: 2020–21
- Pyramids
  - Egypt Cup: 2023–24
  - CAF Champions League: 2024–25
  - CAF Super Cup: 2025
  - FIFA African–Asian–Pacific Cup: 2025
