= Mohamed Hamdy (footballer, born 1995) =

Egyptian footballer

Mohamed Hamdy محمد حمدي
Personal information
- Full name: Mohamed Hamdy Mahmoud Sharaf Eldin
- Date of birth: 15 March 1995 (age 31)
- Place of birth: Cairo, Egypt
- Height: 1.74 m (5 ft 9 in)
- Position: Left-back

Team information
- Current team: Pyramids
- Number: 21

Youth career
- 2005–2014: Al Ahly

Senior career*
Years	Team	Apps	(Gls)
2014–2016	Al Ahly	3	(0)
2015–2016	→ Al Mokawloon Al Arab (loan)	2	(0)
2016–2018	Al Masry	65	(2)
2018–	Pyramids	28	(2)

International career^{‡}
2015	Egypt U-23	3	(0)
2021–	Egypt	31	(1)
- * Club domestic league appearances and goals as of 20 May 2022 ‡ National team caps and goals as of 12 October 2025

Mohamed Hamdy Mahmoud Sharaf Eldin (Arabic: محمد حمدي محمود شرف الدين; born 15 March 1995), is an Egyptian footballer who plays for Egyptian Premier League side Pyramids as a left-back and the Egypt national team.

== Club career ==
Hamdy was promoted to Al Ahly's first team in late 2014. On 14 April 2015, he made his debut for the club in a 2014–15 Egyptian Premier League match against Al Assiouty Sport (later known as Pyramids) under Juan Carlos Garrido. He later joined Al Mokawloon Al Arab on loan, then transferred to Al Masry in 2016. In 2018, he joined Pyramids, before extending his contract in 2024.

== International career ==
Hamdy was included in Egypt's squad for the Africa Cup of Nations in both 2023 and 2025. He suffered an ACL injury during the round of 16 match against Benin in the latter tournament.

=== International goals ===
Scores and results list Egypt's goal tally first.

No.	Date	Venue	Opponent	Score	Result	Competition
1.	12 October 2025	Cairo International Stadium, Cairo, Egypt	Guinea-Bissau	1–0	1–0	2026 FIFA World Cup qualification

== Honours ==
Al Ahly

- Egyptian Premier League: 2015–16

Pyramids

- Egypt Cup: 2023–24
- CAF Champions League: 2024–25
- CAF Super Cup: 2025
- FIFA African–Asian–Pacific Cup: 2025
