= Walid El Karti =

Moroccan footballer

Personal information
- Full name: Walid El Karti
- Date of birth: 23 July 1994 (age 32)
- Place of birth: Khouribga, Morocco
- Height: 1.85 m (6 ft 1 in)
- Position: Attacking midfielder

Team information
- Current team: Pyramids FC
- Number: 18

Senior career*
| Years | Team | Apps | (Gls) |
| 2011–2013 | Olympique Khouribga | 2 | (0) |
| 2013–2022 | Wydad AC | 203 | (15) |
| 2022– | Pyramids FC | 101 | (10) |

International career
| 2012–2014 | Morocco U20 | 25 | (3) |
| 2014–2017 | Morocco U23 | 13 | (2) |
| 2014–2021 | Morocco A' | 12 | (2) |
| 2019 | Morocco | 14 | (1) |
Medal record
Men's football
Representing Morocco
African Nations Championship
| Winner | 2018 Morocco |
| Winner | 2020 Cameroon |
FIFA Arab Cup
| Winner | 2025 Qatar |
Mediterranean Games
| Winner | 2013 Turkey |
Islamic Solidarity Games
| Winner | 2013 Indonesia |
Jeux de la Francophonie
| Runner-up | 2013 France |
- * Club domestic league appearances and goals as of 30 August 2025 (UTC)

Walid El Karti (Arabic: وليد الكرتي; born 23 July 1994) is a Moroccan professional footballer, who plays as an attacking midfielder for Pyramids FC.

== International career ==
In January 2014, coach Hassan Benabicha, invited him to be a part of the Moroccan squad for the 2014 African Nations Championship. He helped the team to top group B after drawing with Burkina Faso and Zimbabwe and defeating Uganda. The team was eliminated from the competition at the quarter final stage after losing to Nigeria.

== Career statistics ==
=== International goals ===
Scores and results list Morocco's goal tally first.

| No | Date | Venue | Opponent | Score | Result | Competition |
|---|---|---|---|---|---|---|
| 1. | 31 January 2018 | Stade Mohamed V, Casablanca, Morocco | Libya | 3–1 | 3–1 (a.e.t.) | 2018 African Nations Championship |
| 2. | 4 February 2018 | Stade Mohamed V, Casablanca, Morocco | Nigeria | 2–0 | 4–0 | 2018 African Nations Championship |
| 3. | 10 September 2019 | Marrakesh Stadium, Marrakesh, Morocco | Niger | 1–0 | 1–0 | Friendly |

== Honours ==
=== Club ===
Wydad AC

- Botola Pro: 2014–15, 2016–17, 2018–19, 2020–21, 2021–22
- CAF Champions League: 2017
- CAF Super Cup: 2018

Pyramids FC

- Egypt Cup: 2023–24, 2025–26
- CAF Champions League: 2024–25
- CAF Super Cup: 2025
- FIFA African–Asian–Pacific Cup: 2025

=== International ===
Morocco U20

- Mediterranean Games: Gold medal 2013
- Islamic Solidarity Games: Gold medal 2013
- Jeux de la Francophonie: Silver medal 2013

Morocco A'

- African Nations Championship: 2018, 2020
- FIFA Arab Cup: 2025

Individual

- Wydad AC Player of the Season: 2018–19
