= 2025 FIFA Intercontinental Cup =

2nd edition of the FIFA Intercontinental Cup

Tournament details
- Host country: Final stages: Qatar
- Dates: 14 September – 17 December
- Teams: 6 (from 6 confederations)
- Venues: 3 (in 3 host cities)

Final positions
- Champions: (France) Paris Saint-Germain (1st title)
- Runners-up: (Brazil) Flamengo

Tournament statistics
- Matches played: 5
- Goals scored: 14 (2.8 per match)
- Attendance: 111,067 (22,213 per match)
- Top scorer(s): (Democratic Republic of the Congo) Fiston Mayele (Pyramids); 3 goals
- Best player: (Portugal) Vitinha (Paris Saint-Germain)

The 2025 FIFA Intercontinental Cup (officially known as the FIFA Intercontinental Cup Qatar 2025 presented by Aramco for sponsorship reasons) was the second edition of the FIFA Intercontinental Cup, an annual club association football tournament organised by FIFA. The tournament comprised the six teams that won the previous edition of the continental championships in each FIFA confederation, playing each other in a single-elimination bracket, and took place from 14 September to 17 December 2025.

The tournament broadly maintained the format of the previous annual versions of the FIFA Club World Cup, which was expanded and reorganised into a quadrennial tournament with more entrants, with the exception of changes to venues for the initial rounds. The last three matches took place in Ahmad bin Ali Stadium in Al Rayyan, Qatar.

Real Madrid were the defending champions, but they were not able to defend their title after being eliminated by Arsenal in the quarter-finals of the 2024–25 UEFA Champions League. The eventual winners of that competition Paris Saint-Germain went on to win the Intercontinental Cup for the first time in their history after beating Flamengo marking their first club world champions title.

== Format ==
The details were approved by the FIFA Council on 17 December 2023, with the format formally confirmed on 20 September 2024.

- First round: The winners of the 2024–25 CAF Champions League (Note: As per the rotation policy between AFC and CAF.) played the winners of the 2025 OFC Men's Champions League in the "FIFA African–Asian–Pacific Cup play-off". The match was hosted by the club from the country with the higher ranking in the FIFA Men's World Ranking.
- Second round: The winners of the 2024–25 AFC Champions League Elite played the winners of the first round for the title of the "FIFA African–Asian–Pacific Cup". The match was hosted by the club from the country with the higher ranking in the FIFA Men's World Ranking. In parallel, the winners of the 2025 Copa Libertadores and the winners of the 2025 CONCACAF Champions Cup played each other at a neutral venue in a match that was denominated the "FIFA Derby of the Americas".
- Play-off: The winners of the second round matches played each other in the "FIFA Challenger Cup".
- Final: The winners of the play-off (FIFA Challenger Cup) played the winners of the 2024–25 UEFA Champions League.

== Venues ==
Egypt	Saudi Arabia	Qatar
Cairo	Jeddah	Al Rayyan
30 June Stadium	King Abdullah Sports City	Ahmad bin Ali Stadium
Capacity: 30,000	Capacity: 62,345	Capacity: 45,032
Location of the host city of the 2025 FIFA Intercontinental Cup in Egypt.	Location of the host city of the 2025 FIFA Intercontinental Cup in Saudi Arabia.	Location of the host city of the 2025 FIFA Intercontinental Cup in Qatar.

== Qualified teams ==
Location of the teams participating in the 2025 FIFA Intercontinental Cup.

Team	Confederation	Qualification	Qualified date	Participation
Entering in the final
(France) Paris Saint-Germain	UEFA	Winners of the 2024–25 UEFA Champions League	31 May 2025	1st
Entering in the second round
(Saudi Arabia) Al-Ahli	AFC	Winners of the 2024–25 AFC Champions League Elite	3 May 2025	1st
(Mexico) Cruz Azul	CONCACAF	Winners of the 2025 CONCACAF Champions Cup	1 June 2025	1st
(Brazil) Flamengo	CONMEBOL	Winners of the 2025 Copa Libertadores	29 November 2025	1st
Entering in the first round
(Egypt) Pyramids	CAF	Winners of the 2024–25 CAF Champions League	1 June 2025	1st
(New Zealand) Auckland City	OFC	Winners of the 2025 OFC Men's Champions League	12 April 2025	2nd (Previous: 2024)

== Matches ==
The match schedule was confirmed on 9 September 2025. If a match was tied after normal playing time, 30 minutes of extra time were played. If still tied after extra time, a penalty shoot-out was held to determine the winner.

=== Bracket ===
Derby of the Americas	Challenger Cup	Intercontinental Cup
10 December – Al Rayyan	17 December – Al Rayyan
(Mexico) Cruz Azul	1	(France) Paris Saint-Germain (p)	1 (2)
13 December – Al Rayyan
(Brazil) Flamengo	2	(Brazil) Flamengo	1 (1)
(Brazil) Flamengo	2
African–Asian–Pacific Cup play-off	African–Asian–Pacific Cup	(Egypt) Pyramids	0
23 September – Jeddah
14 September – Cairo	(Saudi Arabia) Al-Ahli	1
(Egypt) Pyramids	3	(Egypt) Pyramids	3
(New Zealand) Auckland City	0

=== First round ===
African–Asian–Pacific Cup play-off
14 September 2025
21:00 EGY

Pyramids (Egypt)	3–0	(New Zealand) Auckland City
El Karti 14'; Hamdy 74'; Ziko 85'	Report

30 June Stadium, Cairo
Attendance: 4,157
Referee: Adham Makhadmeh (Jordan)

=== Second round ===
African–Asian–Pacific Cup
23 September 2025
21:00 AST

Al-Ahli (Saudi Arabia)	1–3	(Egypt) Pyramids
Toney 45' (pen.)	Report	Mayele 21', 71', 75'

King Abdullah Sports City, Jeddah
Attendance: 49,284
Referee: István Kovács (Romania)

Derby of the Americas
10 December 2025
20:00 AST

Cruz Azul (Mexico)	1–2	(Brazil) Flamengo
Sánchez 44'	Report	De Arrascaeta 15', 71'

Ahmad bin Ali Stadium, Al Rayyan
Attendance: 7,108
Referee: Glenn Nyberg (Sweden)

=== Play-off ===
Challenger Cup
13 December 2025
20:00 AST

Flamengo (Brazil)	2–0	(Egypt) Pyramids
Pereira 24'; Danilo 52'	Report

Ahmad bin Ali Stadium, Al Rayyan
Attendance: 8,368
Referee: Abdulrahman Al-Jassim (Qatar)

=== Final ===
17 December 2025
20:00 AST

Paris Saint-Germain (France)	1–1 (a.e.t.)	(Brazil) Flamengo
Kvaratskhelia 38'	Report	Jorginho 62' (pen.)
Penalties
Vitinha (penalty scored); Dembélé (penalty missed); Mendes (penalty scored); Barcola (penalty missed)	2–1	(penalty scored) De la Cruz; (penalty missed) Saúl; (penalty missed) Pedro; (penalty missed) Pereira; (penalty missed) L. Araújo

Ahmad bin Ali Stadium, Al Rayyan
Attendance: 42,150
Referee: Ismail Elfath (United States)

== Goalscorers ==
Rank	Player	Team	Goals
1	(Democratic Republic of the Congo) Fiston Mayele	(Egypt) Pyramids	3
2	(Uruguay) Giorgian de Arrascaeta	(Brazil) Flamengo	2
3	(Brazil) Danilo	(Brazil) Flamengo	1
3	(Morocco) Walid El Karti	(Egypt) Pyramids	1
3	(Egypt) Mohamed Hamdy	(Egypt) Pyramids	1
3	(Italy) Jorginho	(Brazil) Flamengo	1
3	(Georgia (country)) Khvicha Kvaratskhelia	(France) Paris Saint-Germain	1
3	(Brazil) Léo Pereira	(Brazil) Flamengo	1
3	(Mexico) Jorge Sánchez	(Mexico) Cruz Azul	1
3	(England) Ivan Toney	(Saudi Arabia) Al-Ahli	1
3	(Egypt) Mostafa Ziko	(Egypt) Pyramids	1

== Trophies awarded ==
Multiple trophies were awarded to winning teams in the competition. In addition to an updated trophy given to the winners of the Intercontinental Cup final, trophies were awarded to the winning teams of the African–Asian–Pacific Cup (contested by the AFC, CAF and OFC representatives), Derby of the Americas (contested by the CONCACAF and CONMEBOL representatives) and Challenger Cup (contested by the winners of the two aforementioned matches). These trophies were similar to each other, but with different coloured globes.

- Intercontinental Cup: (France) Paris Saint-Germain
- Challenger Cup: (Brazil) Flamengo
- Derby of the Americas: (Brazil) Flamengo
- African–Asian–Pacific Cup: (Egypt) Pyramids

== See also ==
- 2025 FIFA Club World Cup
- 2026 FIFA Women's Champions Cup
