= Pyramids FC =

Association football club in Egypt

Pyramids
- Full name: Pyramids Football Club
- Founded: 2008; 18 years ago as Al Assiouty Sport ... 2018; 8 years ago as Pyramids FC
- Ground: 30 June Stadium
- Capacity: 30,000
- Owner: Salem Al Shamsi
- Chairman: Mamdouh Eid
- Manager: Rhulani Mokwena
- League: Egyptian Premier League
- 2026–27: Egyptian Premier League, 2nd of 21
- Website: pyramidsclub.com
Home colours	Away colours	Third colours

Pyramids Football Club (Arabic: نادي بيراميدز لكرة القدم or نادي الأهرام لكرة القدم) is an Egyptian professional football club based in New Cairo, Cairo Governorate. The club is mainly known for its professional team, that competes in the Egyptian Premier League, the highest league in the Egyptian football league system. Formed in 2008 as Al Assiouty Sport in Beni Suef, the club was bought and moved to Cairo by Turki Al-Sheikh in 2018. Later on, Salem Al Shamsi purchased the club in July 2019.

== History ==
=== Al Assiouty Sport ===
The club was formed as Al Assiouty Sport in Beni Suef in 2008. The club was promoted to the Egyptian Premier League for the first time in 2014, but finished 19th and were relegated in their first season. They won Group A of the Second Division in 2016–17 and were promoted back to the Premier League.

=== Pyramids FC era: 2018–present ===
Pyramids first logo used from 2018 to 2020.

In the summer of 2018, the Chairman of the Saudi Sports Authority Turki Al-Sheikh bought Al Assiouty Sport. The team's name was changed to Pyramids FC, and the club moved from Beni Suef to Cairo. Hossam El-Badry was announced as chairman of the club, Ahmed Hassan as spokesman and football team supervisor, Hady Khashaba as football director and former Botafogo coach Alberto Valentim as the new manager.

In their first season under the new name, Pyramids finished the 2018–19 Egyptian Premier League in third place, qualifying for the 2019–20 CAF Confederation Cup, and reached the 2019 Egypt Cup Final, where they lost 3–0 to Zamalek. In July 2019, the Emirati businessman Salem Al Shamsi acquired the ownership of the club.

Following the club's rebranding and relocation to Cairo in 2018, Pyramids developed a competitive rivalry with Al Ahly. The two clubs have frequently competed for domestic honours, with their encounters becoming among the most anticipated fixtures in Egyptian football. This rivalry is part of the Al Ahly–Pyramids rivalry.

==== First participation in African tournaments (2020–present) ====
Competing in a continental tournament for the first time, Pyramids reached the final of the 2019–20 CAF Confederation Cup despite starting the competition in its preliminary rounds. After beating Étoile du Congo, CR Belouizdad, and Young Africans in the qualifiers they went on to top their group in the First Round, containing Enugu Rangers, FC Nouadhibou, and Al-Masry, winning all bar one of their games. In the quarter-final they beat Zanaco 3–1 over two legs, and then won 1–0 against Horoya in the semi-final. In the final, held in Rabat, they lost 1–0 to Moroccan side RS Berkane. In the league, Pyramids again finished third, in a season disrupted by the COVID-19 pandemic, again qualifying for the following season's CAF Confederation Cup.

On 25 December 2023, in the Egyptian Super Cup semi-final, Pyramids lost on penalty kicks to Modern Future, failing to achieve their first championship. On 30 August 2024, the club achieved their first-ever title following a 1–0 win over ZED in the 2024 Egypt Cup final.

==== African glory (2025) ====
In the 2024–25 season, Pyramids FC topped the regular season standings but ultimately finished second in the Championship play-offs, with Al-Ahly claiming the top spot. On April 25, 2025, they made history by reaching the Champions League final for the first time, overcoming South African side Orlando Pirates with a 3–2 aggregate victory. They went on to claim their maiden CAF Champions League title by defeating another South African club, Mamelodi Sundowns, also with a 3–2 aggregate score.

== Rivalries ==
The Al Ahly–Pyramids rivalry is a football rivalry between Egyptian clubs Al Ahly and Pyramids. The rivalry developed following Pyramids’ relocation to Cairo and rebranding in 2018, as the two clubs increasingly competed for domestic honours. Their encounters have become notable fixtures in Egyptian football, particularly in the Egyptian Premier League and domestic cup competitions. The clubs have also faced each other in decisive matches for major domestic titles, including the Egypt Cup and the Egyptian Super Cup.

== Honours ==
Type	Competition	Titles	Champions	Runners-up
Domestic	Egyptian Premier League	-	-	2021–22, 2022–23, 2023–24, 2024–25, 2025–26
Domestic	Egypt Cup	2	2023–24, 2025–26	2018–19, 2021–22, 2024–25
Domestic	Egyptian Super Cup	-	-	2022–23
Continental	CAF Champions League	1	2024–25	-
Continental	CAF Confederation Cup	-	-	2019–20
Continental	CAF Super Cup	1	2025	-
Intercontinental	FIFA African–Asian–Pacific Cup	1	2025	-
Intercontinental	FIFA Challenger Cup	-	-	2025

== Pyramids Women Team ==
Pyramids also have a women's club, and their team was formed in 2022. They currently compete in the Egyptian Women's Premier League.

== Television channel ==
Pyramids FC TV was an Egyptian sports television channel owned by Pyramids FC and Turki Al-Sheikh, launched in 2018 and closed within the same year.

== Kit suppliers and shirt sponsors ==
Period	Kit manufacturer	Shirt main sponsor	Shirt sponsor (sleeve)
2018–2019	Kappa	Saudia	Swyp
2019–2020	Adidas	None	Swyp
2020–2021	Puma	TikTok	Swyp
2021–	Puma	MyWhoosh	None

== Statistics ==
=== Performance in competitions ===
Year	EPL	Egypt Cup	Egyptian Super Cup	CAF Champions League	CAF Super Cup	CAF Confederation Cup
2018–19	Third place	Runners-up	did not enter	did not enter	did not enter	did not enter
2019–20	Third place	Quarter-finals	did not enter	did not enter	did not enter	Runners-up
2020–21	Third place	Quarter-finals	did not enter	did not enter	did not enter	Semi-finals
2021–22	Runners-up	Runners-up	did not enter	did not enter	did not enter	Quarter-finals
2022–23	Runners-up	Semi-finals	Runners-up	did not enter	did not enter	Quarter-finals
2023–24	Runners-up	Champions	Third place	Group stage	did not enter	did not enter
2024–25	Runners-up	Runners-up	Third place	Champions	Champions	did not enter
2025–26	Runners-up	Champions	Fourth place	Quarterfinals	did not enter	did not enter

=== Performance in CAF competitions ===
- PR = Preliminary round
- FR = First round
- SR = Second round
- PO = Play-off round
- QF = Quarter-final
- SF = Semi-final

Match won	Match drawn	Match lost	Champions	Runners-up

Season	Competition	Round	Country	Club	Home	Away	Aggregate
2019–20	CAF Confederation Cup	PR	Congo	Étoile du Congo	4–1	1–0	5–1
2019–20	CAF Confederation Cup	FR	Algeria	CR Belouizdad	1–1	1–0	2–1
2019–20	CAF Confederation Cup	PO	Tanzania	Young Africans	3–0	2–1	5–1
2019–20	CAF Confederation Cup	Group A	Mauritania	FC Nouadhibou	6–0	1–0	1st
2019–20	CAF Confederation Cup	Group A	Nigeria	Enugu Rangers	0–1	3–1	1st
2019–20	CAF Confederation Cup	Group A	Egypt	Al Masry	2–0	2–1	1st
2019–20	CAF Confederation Cup	QF	Zambia	Zanaco	0–1	3–0	3–1
2019–20	CAF Confederation Cup	SF	Guinea	Horoya	2–0 (Note: Tie was played as a one-legged fixture at a neutral venue in Morocco due to the COVID-19 pandemic in Africa.)		
2019–20	CAF Confederation Cup	Final	Morocco	RS Berkane	0–1		
2020–21	CAF Confederation Cup	FR	Libya	Al Ittihad Tripoli	3–2	1–0	4–2
2020–21	CAF Confederation Cup	PO	Ivory Coast	RC Abidjan	2–0	2–0	4–0
2020–21	CAF Confederation Cup	Group D	Morocco	Raja CA	0–3	0–2	2nd
2020–21	CAF Confederation Cup	Group D	Zambia	Nkana	3–0	1–0	2nd
2020–21	CAF Confederation Cup	Group D	Tanzania	Namungo	1–0	2–0	2nd
2020–21	CAF Confederation Cup	QF	Nigeria	Enyimba	4–1	1–1	5–2
2020–21	CAF Confederation Cup	SF	Morocco	Raja CA	0–0	0–0	0–0 (4–5 p)
2021–22	CAF Confederation Cup	SR	Tanzania	Azam	1–0	0–0	1–0
2021–22	CAF Confederation Cup	PO	DR Congo	AS Maniema Union	1–0	1–0	2–0
2021–22	CAF Confederation Cup	Group A	Tunisia	CS Sfaxien	1–0	1–1	2nd
2021–22	CAF Confederation Cup	Group A	Zambia	Zanaco	1–0	2–0	2nd
2021–22	CAF Confederation Cup	Group A	Libya	Al Ahli Tripoli	2–1	0–1	2nd
2021–22	CAF Confederation Cup	QF	DR Congo	TP Mazembe	0–0	0–2	0–2
2022–23	CAF Confederation Cup	SR	Sudan	Hilal Al Sahil	7–0	2–0	9–0
2022–23	CAF Confederation Cup	PO	Niger	ASN Nigelec	3–0	0–1	3–1
2022–23	CAF Confederation Cup	Group C	Togo	ASKO Kara	1–0	4–1	2nd
2022–23	CAF Confederation Cup	Group C	Egypt	Future FC	2–1	1–1	2nd
2022–23	CAF Confederation Cup	Group C	Morocco	ASFAR	2–2	0–1	2nd
2022–23	CAF Confederation Cup	QF	South Africa	Marumo Gallants	1–1	0–1	1–2
2023–24	CAF Champions League	SR	Rwanda	APR F.C.	6–1	0–0	6–1
2023–24	CAF Champions League	Group A	DR Congo	TP Mazembe	1–0	0–3	4th
2023–24	CAF Champions League	Group A	Mauritania	FC Nouadhibou	2–2	0–2	4th
2023–24	CAF Champions League	Group A	South Africa	Mamelodi Sundowns	0–1	0–0	4th
2024–25	CAF Champions League	FR	Zanzibar	JKU S.C.	6–0	3–1	9–1
2024–25	CAF Champions League	SR	Rwanda	APR F.C.	3–1	1–1	4–2
2024–25	CAF Champions League	Group D	Angola	Sagrada Esperança	5–1	1–0	2nd
2024–25	CAF Champions League	Group D	Mali	Djoliba	6–0	0–0	2nd
2024–25	CAF Champions League	Group D	Tunisia	Espérance de Tunis	2–1	0–2	2nd
2024–25	CAF Champions League	QF	Morocco	AS FAR	4–1	0–2	4–3
2024–25	CAF Champions League	SF	South Africa	Orlando Pirates	3–2	0–0	3–2
2024–25	CAF Champions League	Final	South Africa	Mamelodi Sundowns	2–1	1–1	3–2
2025–26	CAF Champions League	FR	Rwanda	APR	3–0	2–0	5–0
2025–26	CAF Champions League	SR	Ethiopia	Ethiopian Insurance	2–0	1–1	3–1
2025–26	CAF Champions League	Group A	Morocco	RS Berkane	3–0	0–0	1st
2025–26	CAF Champions League	Group A	Zambia	Power Dynamos	3–1	1–0	1st
2025–26	CAF Champions League	Group A	Nigeria	Rivers United	3–0	4–1	1st
2025–26	CAF Champions League	QF	Morocco	AS FAR	1–2	1–1	2–3

== Players ==
=== Current squad ===
As of 22 September 2026

Note: Flags indicate national team as defined under FIFA eligibility rules; some limited exceptions apply. Players may hold more than one non-FIFA nationality.

No.	Pos.	Nation	Player
1	GK	EGY	Ahmed El Shenawy
3	DF	EGY	Mahmoud Marei
4	DF	EGY	Ahmed Samy
5	DF	EGY	Ali Gabr (captain)
6	DF	EGY	Osama Galal
7	MF	EGY	Youssef Obama
8	MF	EGY	Mahmoud Saber
9	FW	EGY	Ahmed Kader
11	FW	EGY	Mostafa Fathi
12	DF	EGY	Ahmed Tawfik
13	FW	ALG	Nadhir Benbouali
14	MF	EGY	Mohanad Lasheen
15	DF	MAR	Mohamed Chibi
17	MF	EGY	Zalaka
18	MF	MAR	Walid El Karti
20	FW	EGY	Abdel Rahman Magdy

No.	Pos.	Nation	Player
21	DF	EGY	Mohamed Hamdy
23	MF	EGY	Otta
25	FW	JOR	Odeh Al-Fakhouri
26	FW	EGY	Mohamed El Gabbas
27	MF	EGY	Nasser Maher
28	GK	EGY	Mahmoud Gad
29	DF	EGY	Karim Hafez
30	FW	EGY	Mostafa Ziko
31	GK	EGY	Hazem Gamal
32	MF	BRA	Ewerton
34	DF	EGY	Eyad El Askalany (on loan from Rostov)
35	MF	EGY	Ahmed Fawzi
37	MF	EGY	Hassan Tarek
38	FW	EGY	Ali Hamouda
39	FW	EGY	Mesho
40	MF	EGY	Ziad Saoudi

=== Out on loan ===
Note: Flags indicate national team as defined under FIFA eligibility rules; some limited exceptions apply. Players may hold more than one non-FIFA nationality.

No.	Pos.	Nation	Player
—	FW	EGY	Abdel Rahman Magdy (at Al Ittihad until 30 June 2026)
—	DF	EGY	Abdo Gouda (at Al Ittihad until 30 June 2026)
—	DF	EGY	Tarek Alaa (at ZED FC until 30 June 2026)

== Managers ==
As of 28 April 2026

Name	Nationality	From	To	P	W	D	L	Win %	Notes
Name	Nationality	From	To	Record					Notes
Alberto Valentim	Brazil	1 July 2018	16 August 2018	3	2	1	0	66.67	
Ricardo La Volpe	Argentina	17 August 2018	29 October 2018	7	3	3	1	42.86	
Hossam Hassan	Egypt	29 October 2018	25 January 2019	11	6	5	0	54.55	
Ahmed Hassan (interim)	Egypt	25 January 2019	5 February 2019	1	1	0	0	100.00	
Ramón Díaz	Argentina	5 February 2019	31 May 2019	13	8	4	1	61.54	
Sébastien Desabre	France	8 July 2019	19 December 2019	19	12	4	3	63.16	
Abdel Aziz Abdel Shafy (interim)	Egypt	20 December 2019	27 December 2019	2	1	1	0	50.00	
Ante Čačić	Croatia	26 December 2019	1 November 2020	33	21	3	9	63.64	
Rodolfo Arruabarrena	Argentina	11 November 2020	30 June 2021	37	18	12	7	48.65	
Takis Gonias	Greece	29 June 2021	11 September 2021	12	5	6	1	41.67	
Ehab Galal	Egypt	11 September 2021	24 April 2022	27	17	6	4	62.96	
Takis Gonias	Greece	25 April 2022	4 January 2023	39	24	5	10	61.54	
Jaime Pacheco	Portugal	5 January 2023	5 February 2024	58	31	14	13	53.45	
Krunoslav Jurčić	Croatia	7 February 2024	17 July 2026	131	83	27	21	63.36	
Rhulani Mokwena	South Africa	17 July 2026	present						
