= 2024–25 Zamalek SC season =

Zamalek
2024–25 season
- Chairman: Hussein Labib
- Manager: José Gomes (until 11 December); Ahmed Magdy (caretaker, 11–16 December); Christian Gross (16 December–13 February); José Peseiro (14 February–7 May); Ayman El Ramady ( from 7 May- Now)
- Stadium: Cairo International Stadium
- Egyptian Premier League: 3rd
- Egypt Cup: Winners
- Egyptian League Cup: Group stage
- Egyptian Super Cup: Runners-up
- CAF Confederation Cup: Quarter-finals
- CAF Super Cup: Winners
- Top goalscorer: League: Nasser Mansi (11); All: Nasser Mansi (13)
Home colours	Away colours

The 2024–25 season was the 114th season in Zamalek Sporting Club's history and the 66th consecutive season in the Premier League. In addition to the domestic league, Zamalek competed in the domestic cup, the Egyptian League Cup, Egyptian Super Cup, CAF Confederation Cup, and CAF Super Cup.

== Transfers ==
=== In ===
Date	Pos.	Player	From	Fee	Ref.
20 August 2024	FW	(Egypt) Hossam Ashraf	(Egypt) Baladiyat El Mahalla	Loan return	
20 August 2024	MF	(Egypt) Maged Hany	(Egypt) Baladiyat El Mahalla	Loan return	
21 August 2024	MF	(Egypt) Mohamed Shehata	(Egypt) Tala'ea El Gaish	10,000,000 EGP	
31 August 2024	DF	(Morocco) Mahmoud Bentayg	(France) Saint-Étienne	Loan	
4 September 2024	FW	(Palestine) Omar Faraj	(Sweden) AIK	Undisclosed	
9 September 2024	MF	(Egypt) Mohamed Hamdi	(Egypt) ENPPI	Loan + €56k	
10 September 2024	FW	(Senegal) Sidy Ndiaye	(Senegal) Guédiawaye FC	Undisclosed	
12 September 2024	MF	(Poland) Konrad Michalak	(Saudi Arabia) Ohod	Loan	
25 September 2024	DF	(Guinea-Bissau) Djeferson Costa	(Portugal) Castelo Branco	Free	

=== Out ===
Date	Pos.	Player	To	Fee	Ref.
21 July 2024	DF	(Egypt) Mahmoud Alaa	(Libya) Asswehly	Contract terminated	
1 August 2024	MF	(Senegal) Ibrahima Ndiaye	(Saudi Arabia) Al-Hazem	End of contract	
29 August 2024	MF	(Egypt) Mohamed Ashraf Roqa	(Egypt) Haras El Hodoud	Contract terminated	
6 September 2024	FW	(Egypt) Youssef Obama	(Egypt) Pyramids	End of contract	
7 September 2024	FW	(Egypt) Mohamad Salah Zaki	(Egypt) El Sekka El Hadid	Loan	
12 September 2024	MF	(Egypt) Hamdy Alaa	(Egypt) ZED	Undisclosed	
12 September 2024	MF	(Egypt) Maged Hany	(Egypt) ZED	Undisclosed	
3 October 2024	MF	(Egypt) Sayed Abdallah	National Bank of Egypt	Loan	
3 November 2024	FW	(Egypt) Ali Yasser		Released	
6 November 2024	FW	(Benin) Samson Akinyoola		Contract terminated	
12 January 2025	FW	(Palestine) Omar Faraj	(Sweden) Degerfors IF	Loan	

=== Contracts ===
Position	Player	Date	Until	Ref.
GK	(Egypt) Mohamed Awad	31 August 2024	2027	
DF	(Egypt) Mohamed Abdel Shafy	9 October 2024	2025	
DF	(Egypt) Ahmed Refai	3 December 2024	Undisclosed	

== Friendlies ==
31 August 2024 Friendly	Zamalek (Egypt)	v	(Saudi Arabia) Al-Ansar	Borg El Arab, Alexandria
18:00 UTC+3
Note: The match was cancelled following Al-Ansar's request.

31 August 2024 Friendly	Zamalek (Egypt)	3–0	(Egypt) Sporting	Borg El Arab, Alexandria
	Gaafar 45'; Shalaby 83'; Akinyoola 85'

3 September 2024 Friendly	Zamalek (Egypt)	3–0	(Saudi Arabia) Al-Shoulla	Borg El Arab, Alexandria
18:00 UTC+3	Abdallah 3'; Esho 60'; Mansi 90'	Report

7 September 2024 Friendly	Zamalek (Egypt)	3–2	(Egypt) Raya	Borg El Arab, Alexandria
10:00 UTC+3	Akinyoola; Bentayg; Ashraf	Report

7 September 2024 Friendly	Zamalek (Egypt)	3–2	(Iraq) Al-Shorta	Borg El Arab, Alexandria
18:30 UTC+3	Mansi; Donga; El Said

21 September 2024 Friendly	Zamalek (Egypt)	4–1	(Egypt) Zamalek Youth	Cairo
11:00 UTC+3	Hamdi; Faraj; Michalak; Mansi		Ndiaye

10 October 2024 Friendly	Zamalek (Egypt)	1–2	(Egypt) Petrojet	Cairo
	Shalaby 57'	Report		Stadium: Petrosport Stadium

13 October 2024 Friendly	Zamalek (Egypt)	1–1	(Egypt) Eastern Company	Cairo
10:30 UTC+3	Akinyoola 65'	Report	Tarek 30'

13 October 2024 Friendly	Zamalek (Egypt)	2–3	(Egypt) ZED	Cairo
	Michalak 55'; Mathlouthi 75'	Report	Dilson 3'; Ibrahim 73'; Hussein

3 November 2024 Friendly	Zamalek (Egypt)	2–1	(Egypt) El Shams	Cairo
12:00 UTC+3	Costa 52'; Ashraf 63'	Report	55'	Stadium: Abdel Latif Abu Regila Stadium

15 November 2024 Testimonial match	Al-Nasr (Libya)	2–1	(Egypt) Zamalek	Benghazi, Libya
20:30 UTC+2	Lukombe 1'; Mugadam 87'	Report	Costa 26'	Stadium: Benina Martyrs Stadium

28 November 2024 Friendly	Zamalek (Egypt)	1–0	(Egypt) Nasr City	Cairo
11:00 UTC+2	Ashraf 82'			Stadium: Abdel Latif Abu Regila Stadium

4 December 2024 Friendly	Zamalek (Egypt)	3–0	(Egypt) El Raja	Cairo
11:00 UTC+2	Ashraf; Kamal; Jaziri			Stadium: Abdel Latif Abu Regila Stadium

11 December 2024 Friendly	Zamalek (Egypt)	v	(Egypt) Diamond	Cairo
11:00 UTC+2				Stadium: Abdel Latif Abu Regila Stadium
Note: The match was cancelled.

== Competitions ==
=== Overall record ===
Competition	First match	Last match	Starting round	Final position	Record							
Competition	First match	Last match	Starting round	Final position	Pld	W	D	L	GF	GA	GD	Win %
Premier League regular season	1 November 2024	4 March 2025	Matchday 1	3rd	17	9	5	3	30	16	+14	52.94
Premier League championship round	11 March 2025	31 May 2025	Matchday 1	3rd	8	4	3	1	14	6	+8	50.00
Egypt Cup	9 January 2025	5 June 2025	Round of 32	Winners	5	4	1	0	11	5	+6	80.00
Egyptian League Cup	19 March 2025	16 April 2025	Group stage	Group stage	4	1	2	1	3	3	+0	25.00
Egyptian Super Cup	20 October 2024	24 October 2024	Semi-finals	Runners-up	2	0	2	0	1	1	+0	0.00
CAF Confederation Cup	14 September 2024	9 April 2025	Second round	Quarter-finals	10	6	3	1	14	6	+8	60.00
CAF Super Cup	27 September 2024		Final	Winners	1	0	1	0	1	1	+0	0.00
Total					47	24	17	6	74	38	+36	51.06

Source: Competitions

=== Egyptian Premier League ===
==== Regular season ====
Pos	Team	Pld	W	D	L	GF	GA	GD	Pts	Qualification or relegation
1	Pyramids	17	13	3	1	32	10	+22	42	Qualification for the championship play-offs
2	Al Ahly	17	11	6	0	30	9	+21	39	Qualification for the championship play-offs
3	Zamalek	17	9	5	3	30	16	+14	32	Qualification for the championship play-offs
4	Al Masry	17	8	6	3	19	11	+8	30	Qualification for the championship play-offs
5	National Bank of Egypt	17	8	5	4	22	18	+4	29	Qualification for the championship play-offs

Source: Soccerway (regular season)
Rules for classification: 1) Points; 2) Goal difference; 3) Goals scored.

===== Results summary =====
Overall								Home						Away					
Pld	W	D	L	GF	GA	GD	Pts	W	D	L	GF	GA	GD	W	D	L	GF	GA	GD
8	5	2	1	17	8	+9	17	3	1	1	9	6	+3	2	1	0	8	2	+6

Last updated: 16 January 2025.

===== Results by round =====
Round	1	2	3	4	5	6	7	8	9
Ground	H	A	H	A	H	A	H	H	A
Result	W	W	L	W	D	D	W	W	
Position	4	2	5	2	3	2	2	2	

Updated to match(es) played on 16 January 2025. Source:
A = Away; H = Home; W = Win; D = Draw; L = Loss

===== Matches =====
The league schedule was released on 19 October 2024.

1 November 2024 1	Zamalek	3–2	National Bank	Cairo
20:00 UTC+2	Maher 38'; Mansi 53'; El Said 90+8' (pen.)		Helal 50' (pen.), 76' (pen.)	Stadium: Al Salam Stadium; Referee: Mohamed Adel
Note: The match was held at Al Salam Stadium instead of Cairo International Stadium.

8 November 2024 2	Smouha	0–2	Zamalek	Alexandria
17:00 UTC+2			Mansi 2'; Shalaby 85'	Stadium: Borg El Arab Stadium; Referee: Tarek Magdy

23 November 2024 3	Zamalek	0–1	Al Masry	Alexandria
20:00 UTC+2			El Shamy 45+3'	Stadium: Borg El Arab Stadium; Referee: Mohamed El Hanafy

2 December 2024 4	Ghazl El Mahalla	0–4	Zamalek	El Mahalla El Kubra
20:00 UTC+2	Zakaria (red card) 3'		Mansi 18', 21'; Zizo 72' (pen.); Abdelmaguid 79'	Stadium: Ghazl El Mahalla Stadium; Referee: Mahmoud Bassiouni

19 December 2024 5	Zamalek	1–1	Ceramica Cleopatra	Cairo
20:00 UTC+2	Adel 20' (o.g.)		Issa 13'	Stadium: Cairo International Stadium; Referee: Amin Omar

24 December 2024 6	Tala'ea El Gaish	2–2	Zamalek	Cairo
20:00 UTC+2	Chika 35', 55'		Shehata 43'; Ashraf 45+4'	Stadium: Cairo Military Academy Stadium; Referee: Tarek Magdy

29 December 2024 7	Zamalek	2–0	Al Ittihad	Cairo
20:00 UTC+2	Mansi 66'; El Deeb 72' (o.g.)		Mohamed (yellow card) 45+2' (yellow-red card) 57'	Stadium: Cairo International Stadium; Referee: Ahmed El Ghandour

16 January 2025 8	Zamalek	3–2	Haras El Hodoud	Cairo
16:00 UTC+2	Zizo 12', 45+6' (pen.); Shalaby 36'		Roqa 25' (pen.); Mamdouh 86' (pen.)	Stadium: Cairo International Stadium; Referee: Hamada Al Qalawi

23 January 2025 9	Modern Sport	v	Zamalek	Cairo
19:00 UTC+2

==== Championship Round ====
Pos	Team	Pld	W	D	L	GF	GA	GD	Pts	Qualification
1	Al Ahly (C)	8	6	1	1	22	9	+13	58 (Note: Al Ahly were initially deducted three points for refusing to play their away fixture against Zamalek, scheduled to be played on 11 March 2025. The points deduction was later cancelled by the Egyptian Premier League.)	Qualification for the Champions League first or second round
2	Pyramids	8	4	2	2	15	10	+5	56	Qualification for the Champions League first or second round
3	Zamalek	8	4	3	1	14	6	+8	47	Qualification for the Confederation Cup first or second round
4	Al Masry	8	3	3	2	10	9	+1	42	Qualification for the Confederation Cup first or second round
5	National Bank of Egypt SC	8	2	3	3	13	12	+1	38	

Source: Soccerway (championship round)
Rules for classification: 1) Points; 2) Goal difference; 3) Goals scored; 4) Play-off tie.
(Note: Clubs qualified for this phase with the full regular season points they got, but without goals for or against)
(C) Champions

===== Results Summary =====
Overall								Home						Away					
Pld	W	D	L	GF	GA	GD	Pts	W	D	L	GF	GA	GD	W	D	L	GF	GA	GD
3	2	1	0	5	0	+5	7	1	0	0	3	0	+3	1	1	0	2	0	+2

Last updated: 2 May 2025.

===== Matches =====
11 March 2025 1	Zamalek	3–0; Awarded (Note: The match was cancelled and awarded to Zamalek after Al Ahly refused to show up as scheduled, citing concerns with the Egyptian officiating crew.)	Al Ahly	Cairo
21:30 UTC+2		Report		Stadium: Cairo International Stadium

13 April 2025 2	Haras El Hodoud	0–2	Zamalek	Alexandria
19:00 UTC+2		Report	El Said 45' (pen.); Mansi 89'	Stadium: Borg El Arab Stadium

1 May 2025 3	Al Masry	0–0	Zamalek	Alexandria
19:00 UTC+2		Report		Stadium: Borg El Arab Stadium

5 May 2025 4	National Bank	2–2	Zamalek	Cairo
19:00 UTC+2	Faisal 71' (pen.); Annor 90+3'	Report	Nasser Mansi 1'; Jaziri 90+1'	Stadium: Cairo International Stadium

9 May 2025 5	Ceramica Cleopatra	2–2	Zamalek	Cairo
16:00 UTC+2	Issa 64'; Belhadji 90+4'	Report	Nasser Mansi 14'; Jaziri 69'	Stadium: Arab Contractors Stadium

=== Egypt Cup ===
9 January 2025 Round of 32	Zamalek	2–0	Abu Qair Semad	Cairo
14:30 UTC+2	Zizo 21', (penalty missed) 42'; Shalaby 90+2'			Stadium: Cairo International Stadium; Referee: Ibrahim Mohamed

7 March 2025 Round of 16	Zamalek	2–1 (a.e.t.)	Modern Sport	Cairo
21:30 UTC+2				Stadium: Cairo International Stadium

15 March 2025 Quarter-finals	Zamalek	4–2	Smouha	Cairo
21:30 UTC+2	Jaziri 12'; Haggag 59'; Bentayg 61'; Shalaby 90+5'		Mostafa 25'; Salem 45+2'	Stadium: Cairo International Stadium

28 March 2025 Semi-finals	Zamalek	2–1	Ceramica Cleopatra	Cairo
21:30 UTC+2	A. Said 33'; Zizo 90'		Mukka 58'	Stadium: Cairo International Stadium

5 June 2025 Final	Zamalek	1–1 (a.e.t.) (8–7 p)	Pyramids
21:00 UTC+2

=== Egyptian League Cup ===
==== Group stage ====
Pos	Team	Pld	W	D	L	GF	GA	GD	Pts	Qualification
1	Petrojet	4	4	0	0	6	2	+4	12	Advance to knockout stage
2	Modern Sport	4	1	2	1	2	1	+1	5	Advance to knockout stage
3	Zamalek	4	1	2	1	3	3	0	5	
4	El Gouna	4	1	2	1	2	2	0	5	
5	Smouha	4	0	0	4	1	6	−5	0	

Source: EPL
Rules for classification: Group stage tiebreakers

19 March 2025 1	Zamalek	1–1	El Gouna	Cairo
21:00				Stadium: Cairo International Stadium

23 March 2025 2	Petrojet	2–1	Zamalek	Cairo
21:30				Stadium: Cairo Military Academy Stadium

6 April 2025 3	Zamalek	0–0	Modern Sport	Cairo
19:00				Stadium: Cairo International Stadium

16 April 2025 4	Smouha	0–1	Zamalek	Alexandria
17:00				Stadium: Borg El Arab Stadium

=== Egyptian Super Cup ===
The club was invited as a guest team.

20 October 2024 Semi-finals	Zamalek	1–1 (5–4 p)	Pyramids	Abu Dhabi, United Arab Emirates
17:05 UTC+4	Jaziri 40'; Bentayg (yellow card) 50'		Adel 14'; Sobhi (penalty missed) 52'	Stadium: Al Nahyan Stadium; Referee: Mohamed Maarouf
	Penalties
	El Said (penalty scored); Mathlouthi (penalty scored); Abdelmaguid (penalty scored); Mansi (penalty scored); Zizo (penalty scored)		(penalty scored) Hafez; (penalty scored) Magdy; (penalty scored) Obama; (penalty scored) Mayele; (penalty missed) Fathi

24 October 2024 Final	Al Ahly	0–0 (a.e.t.) (7–6 p)	Zamalek	Abu Dhabi, United Arab Emirates
21:00 UTC+4	Attia (yellow card) 26'; Tawfik (yellow card) 47'; Mohamed (yellow card) 51'		Kamal (yellow card) 24'; Maher (yellow card) 64'; El Said (yellow card) 68'	Stadium: Mohammed bin Zayed Stadium; Referee: Amin Omar
	Penalties
	Afsha (penalty scored); Kamal (penalty scored); Attia (penalty scored); El Solia (penalty scored); Slim (penalty missed); Tau (penalty scored); Aymen (penalty missed); Attiyat Allah (penalty scored); El Shahat (penalty scored)		(penalty scored) El Said; (penalty missed) Mathlouthi; (penalty scored) Abdelmaguid; (penalty scored) Mansi; (penalty scored) Zizo; (penalty scored) Hamdi; (penalty missed) Shikabala; (penalty scored) Michalak; (penalty missed) Gaber

=== CAF Confederation Cup ===
==== Second round ====
14 September 2024 First leg	Administration Police (Kenya)	0–1	(Egypt) Zamalek	Nairobi, Kenya
15:00 UTC+3			Abdallah 45+1'	Stadium: Nyayo National Stadium; Referee: Hillary Hambaba (Zambia)

20 September 2024 Second leg	Zamalek (Egypt)	2–1 (3–1 agg.)	(Kenya) Administration Police	Cairo
20:00 UTC+3	Zizo 56'; Maher 60'		Were 66'	Stadium: Cairo International Stadium; Attendance: 0 Referee: Mweshitsama Negongo (Namibia)
Note: The match was held behind closed doors following a sanction from CAF due to the events in the Confederation Cup final.

==== Group stage ====
The group stage draw was held on 7 October 2024.

Pos	Team	Pld	W	D	L	GF	GA	GD	Pts	Qualification
1	(Egypt) Zamalek	6	4	2	0	11	4	+7	14	Advance to knockout stage
2	(Egypt) Al Masry	6	2	3	1	7	4	+3	9	Advance to knockout stage
3	(Nigeria) Enyimba	6	1	2	3	8	12	−4	5	
4	(Mozambique) Black Bulls	6	1	1	4	7	13	−6	4	

Source: CAF
Rules for classification: Group stage tiebreakers

27 November 2024 1	Zamalek (Egypt)	2–0	(Mozambique) Black Bulls	Cairo
21:00 UTC+2	Esho 45+1'; Donga 50'	Report		Stadium: Cairo International Stadium; Referee: Mohamed Diraneh Guedi (Djibouti)

8 December 2024 2	Enyimba (Nigeria)	2–2	(Egypt) Zamalek	Uyo, Nigeria
17:00 UTC+1	Ihemekwele 45+4'; Chinedu Chukwu 57'	Report	Jaziri 33'; Faraj 40'	Stadium: Godswill Akpabio International Stadium; Referee: Jean Claude Ishimwe (Rwanda)

15 December 2024 3	Zamalek (Egypt)	1–0	(Egypt) Al Masry	Alexandria
18:00 UTC+2	Zizo 63'	Report		Stadium: Borg El Arab Stadium; Referee: Mustapha Ghorbal (Algeria)

5 January 2025 4	Al Masry (Egypt)	0–0	(Egypt) Zamalek	Alexandria
18:00 UTC+2				Stadium: Borg El Arab Stadium; Referee: Lahlou Benbraham (Algeria)

12 January 2025 5	Black Bulls (Mozambique)	1–3	(Egypt) Zamalek	Cairo
18:00 UTC+2	Ifoni 62'		Ashraf 51', 53'; Zizo 82'	Stadium: Cairo International Stadium; Referee: Fabricio Duarte (Cape Verde)
Note: The match has been relocated to Cairo due to security concerns arising from the unrest caused by the presidential elections.

19 January 2025 6	Zamalek (Egypt)	3–1	(Nigeria) Enyimba	Cairo
18:00 UTC+2	Shalaby 29'; Jaziri 48', 87'		Ihemekwele 57'	Stadium: Cairo International Stadium; Referee: Pierre Atcho (Gabon)

==== Quarter-finals ====
2 April 2025 First leg	Stellenbosch (South Africa)	0–0	(Egypt) Zamalek	Cape Town, South Africa
15:00 UTC+2		Report		Stadium: Cape Town Stadium; Referee: Tanguy Mebiame (Gabon)

9 April 2025 Second leg	Zamalek (Egypt)	0–1 (0–1 agg.)	(South Africa) Stellenbosch	Cairo
18:00 UTC+2		Report	Nduli 79'	Stadium: Cairo International Stadium; Referee: Bamlak Tessema Weyesa (Ethiopia)

=== CAF Super Cup ===
27 September 2024 Final	Al Ahly (Egypt)	1–1 (3–4 p)	(Egypt) Zamalek	Riyadh, Saudi Arabia
21:00 UTC+3	Tawfik (yellow card) 32'; Abou Ali 44' (pen.)		Mathlouthi (yellow card) 37'; Jaziri (yellow card) 38'; Mansi 77'; Donga (yellow card) 89'	Stadium: Kingdom Arena; Referee: Mutaz Ibrahim (Libya)
	Penalties
	Rabia (penalty scored); Kamal (penalty scored); Attiyat Allah (penalty missed); Mohamed (penalty scored); Abou Ali (penalty missed)		(penalty scored) El Said; (penalty scored) Mathlouthi; (penalty scored) Mansi; (penalty scored) Abdelmaguid

== Statistics ==
=== Goalscorers ===
Rank	Pos.	Player	Premier League	Egypt Cup	EFL Cup	Egyptian Super Cup	Confederation Cup	CAF Super Cup	Total
1	FW	(Egypt) Nasser Mansi	11	1	0	0	0	1	13
2	FW	(Tunisia) Seifeddine Jaziri	4	1	0	1	3	0	9
3	FW	(Egypt) Zizo	3	2	0	0	3	0	8
4	MF	(Egypt) Abdallah El Said	5	1	0	0	1	0	7
5	FW	(Egypt) Mostafa Shalaby	3	2	0	0	1	0	6
6	MF	(Egypt) Nabil Donga	1	1	0	0	1	0	3
6	MF	(Egypt) Nasser Maher	1	0	1	0	1	0	3
6	FW	(Egypt) Hossam Ashraf	1	0	0	0	2	0	3
9	MF	(Egypt) Mohamed Shehata	2	0	0	0	0	0	2
9	DF	(Egypt) Mahmoud Bentayg	1	1	0	0	0	0	2
9	FW	(Egypt) Ahmed Esho	1	0	0	0	1	0	2
9	DF	(Egypt) Hossam Abdelmaguid	2	0	0	0	0	0	2
13	MF	(Egypt) Mohamed El Sayed	1	0	0	0	0	0	1
13	FW	(Egypt) Shikabala	0	1	0	0	0	0	1
13	FW	(Palestine) Omar Faraj	0	0	0	0	1	0	1
13	DF	(Egypt) El Wensh	0	0	1	0	0	0	1
Own goals			5	1	0	0	1	0	7
Totals			41	11	2	1	16	1	72

Last updated: 05 June 2025.
Source: Global Sports Archive
