= 2024 Egyptian Super Cup final =

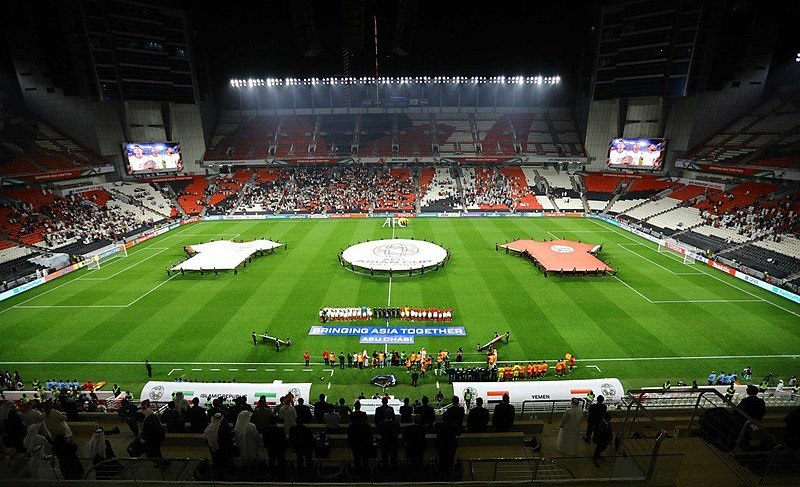
- Mohammed bin Zayed Stadium hosted the match
Al Ahly	Zamalek
0	0
- After extra time Al Ahly won 7–6 on penalties
- Date: 24 October 2024
- Venue: Mohammed bin Zayed Stadium, Abu Dhabi
- Man of the Match: Mohamed El Shenawy (Al Ahly)
- Referee: Amin Omar
- Weather: Fair; 32 °C (90 °F); 66% humidity

The 2024 Egyptian Super Cup final was the final match of the 2024 Egyptian Super Cup, the 22nd edition of the competition since its establishment in 2001, and the second under the new four-team format. It was played between Al Ahly and Zamalek on 24 October 2024 at Mohammed bin Zayed Stadium in Abu Dhabi, United Arab Emirates.

Al Ahly won the match 7–6 on penalties, after the match ended goalless after extra time, winning a record-extending 15th Egyptian Super Cup title.

== Route to the final ==
Al Ahly		Round	Zamalek	
Opponent	Result	2024 Egyptian Super Cup	Opponent	Result
Ceramica Cleopatra	2–1	Semi-finals	Pyramids	1–1 (5–4 p)

== Officials ==
The match officials were announced by the Egyptian Football Association on 23 October 2024, one day before the final. Amin Omar was selected as the referee for the match, with Mahmoud Abou El Regal and Ahmed Hossam Taha as assistant referees, Ahmed El Ghandour as the fourth official, Mohamed Maarouf as the video assistant referee (VAR), and Mahmoud Ashour as the assistant VAR.

== Match ==
=== Details ===
24 October 2024
21:00 GST

Al Ahly	0–0 (a.e.t.)	Zamalek
	Report
Penalties
Magdy (penalty scored); Kamal (penalty scored); Attia (penalty scored); El Solia (penalty scored); Slim (penalty missed); Tau (penalty scored); Aymen (penalty missed); Attiyat Allah (penalty scored); El Shahat (penalty scored)	7–6	(penalty scored) El Said; (penalty missed) Mathlouthi; (penalty scored) Abdelmaguid; (penalty scored) Mansi; (penalty scored) Sayed; (penalty scored) Mo. Hamdy; (penalty missed) Shikabala; (penalty scored) Michalak; (penalty missed) Gaber

Mohammed bin Zayed Stadium, Abu Dhabi
Referee: Amin Omar

Al Ahly	Zamalek

GK	1	(Egypt) Mohamed El Shenawy (c)
RB	8	(Egypt) Akram Tawfik	(yellow card) 47'	(substituted off) 100'
CB	6	(Egypt) Yasser Ibrahim
CB	5	(Egypt) Ramy Rabia		(substituted off) 87'
LB	18	(Morocco) Yahia Attiyat Allah
CM	36	(Egypt) Ahmed Nabil Koka		(substituted off) 76'
CM	13	(Egypt) Marwan Attia	(yellow card) 26'
CM	22	(Egypt) Emam Ashour		(substituted off) 91'
RW	29	(Egypt) Taher Mohamed	(yellow card) 51'	(substituted off) 75'
LW	14	(Egypt) Hussein El Shahat
CF	9	(Palestine) Wessam Abou Ali		(substituted off) 100'
Substitutes:
GK	31	(Egypt) Mostafa Shobeir
DF	3	(Egypt) Omar Kamal		(substituted in) 100'
DF	4	(Qatar) Yousef Aymen		(substituted in) 87'
MF	17	(Egypt) Amr El Solia		(substituted in) 76'
MF	19	(Egypt) Mohamed Magdy		(substituted in) 91'
MF	20	(Egypt) Karim Walid
FW	10	(South Africa) Percy Tau		(substituted in) 100'
FW	12	(Morocco) Reda Slim		(substituted in) 75'
FW	38	(Egypt) Mohamed Abdallah
Manager:
(Switzerland) Marcel Koller

GK	1	(Egypt) Mohamed Awad
RB	4	(Egypt) Omar Gaber (c)
CB	24	(Tunisia) Hamza Mathlouthi
CB	5	(Egypt) Hossam Abdelmaguid
LB	3	(Morocco) Mahmoud Bentayg		(substituted off) 105'
CM	15	(Egypt) Ziad Kamal	(yellow card) 24'	(substituted off) 35'
CM	17	(Egypt) Mohamed Shehata		(substituted off) 91'
AM	19	(Egypt) Abdallah El Said	(yellow card) 68'
RW	25	(Egypt) Ahmed Sayed
LW	22	(Egypt) Nasser Maher	(yellow card) 64'	(substituted off) 106'
CF	30	(Tunisia) Seifeddine Jaziri		(substituted off) 91'
Substitutes:
GK	16	(Egypt) Mohamed Sobhy
DF	6	(Egypt) Mostafa El Zenary
DF	36	(Egypt) Mohamed Hamdy		(substituted in) 105'
MF	33	(Egypt) Ahmed Mahmoud
MF	39	(Egypt) Mohamed El Sayed		(substituted in) 91'
FW	9	(Egypt) Nasser Mansi		(substituted in) 91'
FW	10	(Egypt) Shikabala		(substituted in) 106'
FW	11	(Palestine) Omar Faraj
FW	21	(Poland) Konrad Michalak		(substituted in) 35'
Manager:
(Portugal) José Gomes

Man of the Match:
Mohamed El Shenawy (Al Ahly)

Assistant referees:
Mahmoud Abou El Regal
Ahmed Hossam Taha
Fourth official:
Ahmed El Ghandour
Video assistant referee:
Mohamed Maarouf
Assistant video assistant referee:
Mahmoud Ashour

Match rules

- 90 minutes
- 30 minutes of extra time if necessary
- Penalty shoot-out if scores still level
- Nine named substitutes
- Maximum of five substitutions, with a sixth allowed in extra time (Note: Each team was given only three opportunities to make substitutions, with a fourth opportunity in extra time, excluding substitutions made at half-time, before the start of extra time and at half-time in extra time.)
