= 2024–25 Al Ahly SC season =

Al Ahly
2024–25 season
- Chairman: Mahmoud El Khatib
- Manager: Marcel Koller (until 26 April); Emad El Nahhas (from 30 April)
- Stadium: Cairo International Stadium (official)
- Egyptian Premier League: Champions
- Egypt Cup: Disqualified
- Egyptian League Cup: Group stage
- Egyptian Super Cup: Winners
- CAF Champions League: Semi-finals
- CAF Super Cup: Runners-up
- FIFA Intercontinental Cup: Play-off
- FIFA Club World Cup: Group stage
- Top goalscorer: League: Emam Ashour (13 goals); All: Emam Ashour; Wessam Abou Ali (19 each)
| Home colours | Away colours | Third colours |
- All statistics correct as of 28 May 2025.

The 2024–25 season was the 118th season in Al Ahly's history and the 66th consecutive season in the Premier League. In addition to the domestic league, Al Ahly is set to compete in the Egyptian League Cup, the CAF Champions League, the Egyptian Super Cup, the FIFA Intercontinental Cup and the FIFA Club World Cup.

The club did not participate in the Egypt Cup, as it had withdrawn from the previous season's edition.

== Kit information ==
Supplier: Adidas
Main sponsor: e&, FABMISR Bank
Sleeve sponsor: GLC Paints, Al Marasem Development
Back sponsor: Shell Helix, Lipton

| Home | Home alt. | Away | Third |
| Goalkeeper 1 | Goalkeeper 2 | Goalkeeper 3 |

== Players ==
=== First-team squad ===
| No. | Pos. | Nat. | Player | Date of birth (age) | Since | Notes |
Goalkeepers
| 1 | GK | (Egypt) | Mohamed El Shenawy (C) | 18 December 1988 (age 37) | 2016 | |
| 16 | GK | (Egypt) | Hamza Alaa | 1 March 2001 (age 25) | 2021 | |
| 31 | GK | (Egypt) | Mostafa Shobier | 17 March 2000 (age 26) | 2019 | |
| 37 | GK | (Egypt) | Mostafa Makhlouf | 11 March 2003 (age 23) | 2023 | ^{U21} |
Defenders
| 2 | RB | (Egypt) | Khaled Abdelfattah | 22 January 1999 (age 27) | 2023 | |
| 3 | RB | (Egypt) | Omar Kamal | 29 September 1993 (age 33) | 2024 | |
| 5 | CB | (Egypt) | Ramy Rabia (VC) | 20 May 1993 (age 33) | 2014 | |
| 6 | CB | (Egypt) | Yasser Ibrahim | 10 February 1993 (age 33) | 2019 | |
| 15 | CB | (Morocco) | Achraf Dari | 6 May 1999 (age 27) | 2024 | |
| 18 | LB | (Morocco) | Yahia Attiyat Allah | 2 March 1995 (age 31) | 2024 | on loan from Sochi |
| 21 | LB | (Tunisia) | Ali Maâloul | 1 January 1990 (age 36) | 2016 | No eligibility - cross-competition |
| 27 | CB/LB | (Egypt) | Mostafa El Aash | 12 October 2000 (age 26) | 2025 | on loan from ZED |
| 30 | RB | (Egypt) | Mohamed Hany | 25 January 1996 (age 30) | 2014 | |
| 33 | LB | (Egypt) | Karim El Debes | 3 June 2003 (age 23) | 2022 | ^{U21} |
| 34 | CB | (Egypt) | Moataz Mohamed | 19 March 2005 (age 21) | 2023 | ^{U19} |
| 50 | CB | (Ghana) | Reindorf Huncho | 1 January 2006 (age 20) | 2024 | ^{U19} |
Midfielders
| 8 | DM | (Egypt) | Akram Tawfik | 8 November 1997 (age 29) | 2016 | |
| 13 | DM | (Egypt) | Marwan Attia | 12 August 1998 (age 28) | 2023 | |
| 17 | CM | (Egypt) | Amr El Solia | 2 April 1990 (age 36) | 2015 | |
| 19 | AM | (Egypt) | Afsha | 6 March 1996 (age 30) | 2019 | |
| 20 | CM | (Egypt) | Karim Walid | 8 August 1997 (age 29) | 2016 | |
| 22 | CM | (Egypt) | Emam Ashour | 20 February 1998 (age 28) | 2023 | |
| 23 | CM | (Egypt) | Omar El Saaiy | 1 January 2003 (age 23) | 2024 | ^{U21} |
| 26 | DM | (Egypt) | Mostafa Abou El Khier | 9 January 2004 (age 22) | 2023 | ^{U21} |
| 36 | DM | (Egypt) | Ahmed Koka | 4 July 2001 (age 25) | 2020 | |
Forwards
| 9 | ST | (Palestine) | Wessam Abou Ali | 4 January 1999 (age 27) | 2024 | |
| 10 | CF | (Slovenia) | Nejc Gradišar | 6 August 2002 (age 24) | 2025 | |
| 12 | LW | (Morocco) | Reda Slim | 25 October 1999 (age 27) | 2023 | No eligibility - cross-competition |
| 14 | LW | (Egypt) | Hussein El Shahat | 21 June 1992 (age 34) | 2019 | |
| 28 | RW | (Egypt) | Karim Fouad | 1 October 1999 (age 27) | 2021 | |
| 29 | CF | (Egypt) | Taher Mohamed | 7 March 1997 (age 29) | 2020 | |
| 32 | ST | (Egypt) | Samir Mohamed | 4 September 2003 (age 23) | 2024 | ^{U21} |
| 34 | LW | (Morocco) | Achraf Bencharki | 24 September 1994 (age 32) | 2025 | |
| 38 | RW | (Egypt) | Mohamed Abdallah | 18 October 2005 (age 21) | 2023 | ^{U19} |

=== Out on loan ===
| Pos | Player | To | End date |
|---|---|---|---|
| FW | (Egypt) Ahmed Abdelkader | Qatar SC | End of the season |
| FW | (Tunisia) Cristo | (Tunisia) Sfaxien | End of the season |
| FW | (Egypt) Mohamed Yasser | (Czech Republic) FK Teplice | End of the season |
| FW | (Egypt) Amr Khaled | (Switzerland) Aarau | End of the season |
| FW | (Ghana) Samuel Oppong | (Egypt) WE SC | End of the season |
| FW | (Egypt) Mostafa El Badry | (Egypt) Smouha | End of the season |
| MF | (Mali) Aliou Dieng | (Saudi Arabia) Al-Kholood | End of the season |
| MF | (Algeria) Ahmed Kendouci | (Egypt) Ceramica Cleopatra | End of the season |
| MF | (Egypt) Kabaka | (Egypt) Modern Sport | End of the season |
| DF | (Egypt) Abdelrahman Rashdan | (Egypt) Modern Sport | End of season 25/26 |
| DF | (Egypt) Youssef Abdelhafiz | (Egypt) Ceramica Cleopatra | End of the season |
| DF | (Egypt) Ahmed Abdin | (Egypt) Ceramica Cleopatra | End of the season |
| DF | (Egypt) Abdallah Bostangy | (Egypt) Smouha | End of the season |

== Transfers ==
=== In ===
| Pos. | Player | From | Fee | Date | Source |
|---|---|---|---|---|---|
| DF | (Qatar) Yousef Aymen | (Qatar) Al Duhail | Loan (Note: In addition to a fee of €229,000.) | 17 July 2024 | |
| DF | (Morocco) Yahia Attiyat Allah | (Russia) Sochi | Loan (Note: In addition to a fee of €200,000.) | 10 August 2024 | |
| MF | (Egypt) Ammar Hamdy | (Egypt) Al Mokawloon | End of loan | 18 August 2024 | |
| MF | (Algeria) Ahmed Kendouci | (Egypt) Ceramica Cleopatra | End of loan | 21 August 2024 | |
| DF | (Egypt) Mohamed Maghrabi | (Egypt) Smouha | End of loan | 21 August 2024 | |
| DF | (Morocco) Achraf Dari | (France) Brest | €1,800,000 | 28 August 2024 | |
| MF | (Egypt) Omar El Saaiy | (Egypt) Ismaily | €931,000 | 31 August 2024 | |
| DF | (Egypt) Mostafa El Aash | (Egypt) ZED | Loan | 24 January 2025 | |
| FW | (Slovenia) Nejc Gradišar | (Hungary) Fehérvár | €1,000,000 | 24 January 2025 | |
| MF | (Egypt) Ahmed Reda | (Egypt) Petrojet | €470,000 | 25 January 2025 | |
| FW | (Morocco) Achraf Bencharki | (Qatar) Al Rayyan | Free Trensfer | 29 January 2025 | |
| MF | (Egypt) Hamdy Fathy | (Qatar) Al Wakrah | Loan | 1 June 2025 | |
| FW | (Egypt) Mohamed Yasser | (Czech Republic) FK Teplice | End of loan | 1 June 2025 | |
| FW | (Egypt) Trézéguet | (Turkey) Trabzonspor | €1,600,000 | 1 June 2025 | |
| GK | (Egypt) Mohamed Seha | (Egypt) Al Mokawloon | €440,000 | 2 June 2025 | |
| MF | (Mali) Aliou Dieng | (Saudi Arabia) Al Kholood | End of loan | 3 June 2025 | |
| MF | (Tunisia) Mohamed Ali Ben Romdhane | (Hungary) Ferencvárosi | €1,580,000 | 3 June 2025 | |
| DF | (Egypt) Beckham | (Egypt) Ceramica Cleopatra | Loan | 4 June 2025 | |
| FW | (Egypt) Ahmed Sayed Zizo | (Egypt) Zamalek | Free Transfer | 6 June 2025 | |

=== Out ===
| Pos. | Player | To | Fee | Date | Source |
|---|---|---|---|---|---|
| FW | (France) Anthony Modeste | | End of contract | 1 July 2024 | |
| FW | (Tunisia) Mohamed Dhaoui | (Tunisia) Sfaxien | Loan | 19 July 2024 | |
| MF | (Mali) Aliou Dieng | (Saudi Arabia) Al Kholood | Loan (Note: In addition to a fee of €505,000.) | 26 July 2024 | |
| GK | (Egypt) Mahmoud El Zanfaly | (Egypt) El Dakhleya | Loan return | 13 August 2024 | |
| FW | (Egypt) Ahmed Abdelkader | Qatar SC | Loan (Note: In addition to a fee of €451,000.) | 19 August 2024 | |
| MF | (Algeria) Ahmed Kendouci | (Egypt) Ceramica Cleopatra | Loan (Note: In addition to a fee of €185,000.) | 28 August 2024 | |
| DF | (Egypt) Mohamed Abdelmonem | (France) Nice | €4,200,000 (Note: Up to €1,000,000 in bonuses + 10% of the next deal as a sell on clause .) | 29 August 2024 | |
| DF | (Egypt) Mahmoud Metwalli | (Egypt) Ittihad Alex | Free | 8 September 2024 | |
| DF | (Egypt) Mohamed Maghrabi | (Egypt) Ittihad Alex | Undisclosed | 14 September 2024 | |
| DF | (Egypt) Mohamed Ashraf | (Egypt) ZED | Undisclosed | 14 September 2024 | |
| FW | (Egypt) Rafaat Khalil | (Egypt) ZED | Undisclosed | 14 September 2024 | |
| FW | (Ghana) Samuel Oppong | (Egypt) WE | Loan | 14 September 2024 | |
| DF | (Egypt) Ahmed Abdin | (Egypt) Ceramica Cleopatra | Loan | 17 September 2024 | |
| DF | (Egypt) Youssef Abdelhafiz | (Egypt) Ceramica Cleopatra | Loan | 19 September 2024 | |
| MF | (Egypt) Ammar Hamdy | (Egypt) ZED | Undisclosed | 25 September 2024 | |
| FW | (Egypt) Shady Radwan | | Free | 30 September 2024 | |
| FW | (Egypt) Omar Moawad | (Spain) Real Betis | €276,000 | 16 October 2024 | |
| FW | (South Africa) Percy Tau | Qatar SC | €155,000 | 11 January 2025 | |
| MF | (Algeria) Ahmed Kendouci | (Egypt) Ceramica Cleopatra | €600,000 | 15 January 2025 | |
| FW | (Egypt) Kahraba | (Libya) Ittihad Tripoli | Loan (Note: In addition to a fee of €125,000.) | 22 January 2025 | |
| DF | (Qatar) Yousef Aymen | (Qatar) Al Duhail | Loan return | 25 January 2025 | |
| MF | (Egypt) Mostafa Abou El Khier | (Egypt) Al Masry | €50,000 | 8 February 2025 | |
| FW | (Egypt) Amr Khaled Bibo | (Switzerland) FC Aarau | | 21 February 2025 | |
| DF | (Egypt) Rami Rabia | (United Arab Emirates) Al Ain FC | End of contract | 1 June 2025 | |
| DF | (Tunisia) Ali Maaloul | | End of contract | 1 June 2025 | |
| MF | (Egypt) Akram Tawfik | (Qatar) Al-Shamal SC | End of contract | 1 June 2025 | |
| MF | (Egypt) Amr El Solia | | End of contract | 1 June 2025 | |
| GK | (Egypt) Hamza Alaa | | End of contract | 1 June 2025 | |

=== Contract renewals ===
| Pos. | Player | Contract length | Contract ends | Date | Source |
|---|---|---|---|---|---|
| MF | (Egypt) Amr El Solia | One year | 2025 | 5 August 2024 | |
| DF | (Tunisia) Ali Maâloul | One year | 2025 | 5 February 2025 | |

== Friendlies ==
| 6 September 2024 Friendly | Al Ahly (Egypt) | 1–0 | (Egypt) Wadi Degla | Cairo |
| | El Shahat | | | Stadium: Mokhtar El Tetsh Stadium |

| 11 October 2024 Friendly | Al Ahly (Egypt) | 3–0 | (Egypt) Haras El Hodoud | Cairo |
| | Afsha; Samir; El Shahat | | | Stadium: Mokhtar El Tetsh Stadium |

| 18 November 2024 Friendly | Al Ahly (Egypt) | 3–0 | (Egypt) Teem FC | Cairo |
| | Afsha; El Solia; El Debes | | | Stadium: Mokhtar El Tetsh Stadium |

=== Mid-season ===
| 26 March 2025 Friendly | Al Ahly (Egypt) | 1–3 | (Egypt) ZED FC | Cairo |
| | | | | Stadium: Mokhtar El Tetsh Stadium |

| 8 June 2025 Friendly | Al Ahly (Egypt) | 1–1 (3–5 p) | (Mexico) Pachuca | Fort Lauderdale, United States |
| 17:00 UTC−4 | | | | Stadium: Chase Stadium |

== Competitions ==
=== Overall record ===
| Competition | First match | Last match | Starting round | Final position | Record | | | | | | | |
| Competition | First match | Last match | Starting round | Final position | Pld | W | D | L | GF | GA | GD | Win % |
|---|---|---|---|---|---|---|---|---|---|---|---|---|
| Egyptian Premier League | 2 November 2024 | 28 May 2025 | Matchday 1 | Winners | 25 | 17 | 7 | 1 | 52 | 18 | +34 | 68.00 |
| Egyptian League Cup | 20 March 2025 | 17 April 2025 | Group stage | Group stage | 3 | 0 | 0 | 3 | 2 | 6 | −4 | 0.00 |
| Egyptian Super Cup | 20 October 2024 | 24 October 2024 | Semi-finals | Winners | 2 | 1 | 1 | 0 | 2 | 1 | +1 | 50.00 |
| CAF Champions League | 15 September 2024 | 25 April 2025 | Second round | Semi-finals | 12 | 7 | 3 | 2 | 23 | 8 | +15 | 58.33 |
| CAF Super Cup | 27 September 2024 | | Final | Runners-up | 1 | 0 | 1 | 0 | 1 | 1 | +0 | 0.00 |
| FIFA Intercontinental Cup | 29 October 2024 | 14 December 2024 | Second Round | Challenger Cup | 2 | 1 | 1 | 0 | 3 | 0 | +3 | 50.00 |
| FIFA Club World Cup | 14 June 2025 | 23 June 2025 | Group stage | Group stage | 3 | 0 | 2 | 1 | 4 | 6 | −2 | 0.00 |
| Total | | | | | 48 | 26 | 15 | 7 | 87 | 40 | +47 | 54.17 |

Last updated: 23 June 2025
Source: Competitions

=== Egyptian Premier League ===
==== Regular season ====
| Pos | Team | Pld | W | D | L | GF | GA | GD | Pts | Qualification or relegation |
|---|---|---|---|---|---|---|---|---|---|---|
| 1 | Pyramids | 17 | 13 | 3 | 1 | 32 | 10 | +22 | 42 | Qualification for the championship play-offs |
| 2 | Al Ahly | 17 | 11 | 6 | 0 | 30 | 9 | +21 | 39 | Qualification for the championship play-offs |
| 3 | Zamalek | 17 | 9 | 5 | 3 | 30 | 16 | +14 | 32 | Qualification for the championship play-offs |
| 4 | Al Masry | 17 | 8 | 6 | 3 | 19 | 11 | +8 | 30 | Qualification for the championship play-offs |
| 5 | National Bank of Egypt | 17 | 8 | 5 | 4 | 22 | 18 | +4 | 29 | Qualification for the championship play-offs |

Source: Soccerway (regular season)
Rules for classification: 1) Points; 2) Goal difference; 3) Goals scored.

===== Results summary =====
| Overall | | | | | | | | Home | | | | | | Away | | | | | |
| Pld | W | D | L | GF | GA | GD | Pts | W | D | L | GF | GA | GD | W | D | L | GF | GA | GD |
|---|---|---|---|---|---|---|---|---|---|---|---|---|---|---|---|---|---|---|---|
| 17 | 11 | 6 | 0 | 30 | 9 | +21 | 36 | 6 | 3 | 0 | 18 | 7 | +11 | 5 | 3 | 0 | 12 | 2 | +10 |

Last updated: 11 March 2025.

===== Results by round =====
| Round | 1 | 2 | 3 | 4 | 5 | 6 | 7 |
|---|---|---|---|---|---|---|---|
| Ground | H | A | H | H | A | A | |
| Result | W | W | D | D | P | W | |
| Position | 1 | 1 | 1 | 3 | | 2 | |

Updated to match(es) played on 1 December 2024. Source:
A = Away; H = Home; W = Win; D = Draw; L = Loss

===== Matches =====
The league schedule was released on 19 October 2024.

| 2 November 2024 1 | Al Ahly | 5–2 | Ceramica Cleopatra | Cairo |
| 20:00 UTC+2 | El Shahat 4', 60'; Abou Ali 45+3', 46'; Mohamed 69' | | Belhadji 24' (pen.); Kendouci 79' | Stadium: Al Salam Stadium; Referee: Mahmoud Bassiouni |
Note: The match was held at Al Salam Stadium instead of Cairo International Stadium.

| 7 November 2024 2 | ZED | 0–1 | Al Ahly | Cairo |
| 20:00 UTC+2 | | | Mohamed 11' | Stadium: Osman Ahmed Osman Stadium; Referee: Mahmoud Nagy |
Note: The match was held at Osman Ahmed Osman Stadium instead of Cairo International Stadium.

| 22 November 2024 3 | Al Ahly | 1–1 | Al Ittihad | Cairo |
| 20:00 UTC+2 | Ashour (penalty missed) 44'; El Solia 67' (pen.) | | Aubame 87' | Stadium: Al Salam Stadium; Referee: Mohamed Maarouf |
Note: The match was held at Al Salam Stadium instead of Cairo International Stadium.

| 1 December 2024 4 | National Bank | 0–0 | Al Ahly | Cairo |
| 17:00 UTC+2 | | | | Stadium: Al Salam Stadium; Referee: Mohamed El Hanafy |

| 26 December 2024 6 | Al Masry | 0–2 | Al Ahly | Alexandria |
| 18:00 UTC+2 | Attidjikou (yellow card) 38' | Report | Attiyat Allah 39'; El Solia (yellow card) 47'; Afsha 90+6' | Stadium: Borg El Arab Stadium; Attendance: 10,000; Referee: Mahmoud El Banna |

| 30 December 2024 7 | ENPPI | 0–0 | Al Ahly | Nasr City |
| | | | | Stadium: Osman Ahmed Osman Stadium |

| 7 January 2025 5 | Al Ahly | 2–0 | Smouha | Cairo |
| 16:00 UTC+2 | Afsha 45+3'; Ashour 50' | | | Stadium: Cairo International Stadium; Referee: Nader Qamar El Dawla |

| 15 January 2025 8 | Al Ahly | 2–0 | El Gouna | Cairo |
| | Ashour 62', 90+2' | | | Stadium: Cairo International Stadium; Referee: Mahmoud El Hamada |

| 22 January 2025 9 | Pharco | 1–1 | Al Ahly | Alexandria |
| 16:00 UTC+2 | Moutaraji 22'; Marei (yellow card) 26'; Sherif (yellow card) 45+4'; Ndiaye (yellow card) 83' | Report | El Saaiy (yellow card) 5'; Emam Ashour (yellow card) 45+1' (goal) 45+11' (pen.); Samir Mohamed (yellow card) 90+3' | Stadium: Borg El Arab Stadium; Referee: Mohamed Marouf |

| 26 January 2025 10 | Al Ahly | 2–2 | Pyramids | Cairo |
| 19:00 UTC+2 | Rabia 52'; Gradišar 54'; Emam Ashour (penalty missed) 90+1' | Report | Rabia 18' (o.g.); Tawfik (red card) 41'; Fathi 51' (pen.); Hafez (yellow card) 74'; Samy (yellow card) 88'; Awujoola (yellow card) 88'; El Shenawy (yellow card) 88'; Gabr (yellow card) 90+1' | Stadium: Cairo International Stadium; Referee: Mahmoud El Banna |

| 2 February 2025 11 | Modern Sport | 1–3 | Al Ahly | Cairo |
| 19:00 UTC+2 | Zazaa (yellow card) 3'; Eba 75' | Report | Hany (yellow card) 7'; Gradišar 13'; Emam Ashour 29' 39' | Stadium: Al Salam Stadium; Referee: Tarek Magdy |

| 6 February 2025 12 | Al Ahly | 2–1 | Petrojet | Cairo |
| 19:00 UTC+2 | Ashour 15'; Gradišar 67' | Report | Farouk 90+5' | Stadium: Al Salam Stadium |
Note: The match is held at Al Salam Stadium instead of Cairo International Stadium.

| 11 February 2025 13 | Al Ahly | 1–0 | Ghazl El Mahalla | Cairo |
| 19:00 UTC+2 | Ashour 56' | Report | | Stadium: Al Salam Stadium |
Note: The match is held at Al Salam Stadium instead of Cairo International Stadium.

| 16 February 2025 14 | Ismaily | 0–4 | Al Ahly | Alexandria |
| 19:00 UTC+2 | | Report | Attia 9' (pen.); Ashour 51'; El Shahat 83'; Hashem 87' | Stadium: Borg El Arab Stadium |

| 22 February 2025 15 | Al Ahly | 1–1 | Zamalek | Cairo |
| 19:00 UTC+2 | Bencharki 72' | Report | Bentayg 84' | Stadium: Al Salam Stadium |
Note: The match is held at Al Salam Stadium instead of Cairo International Stadium.

| 26 February 2025 16 | Haras El Hodoud | 0–1 | Al Ahly | Alexandria |
| 16:00 UTC+2 | | Report | Bencharki 90+3' | Stadium: Haras el-Hodoud Stadium |

| 5 March 2025 17 | Al Ahly | 2–0 | Tala'ea El Gaish | Cairo |
| 21:00 UTC+2 | Gradišar 41'; Attia 90+7' (pen.) | | | Stadium: Al Salam Stadium; Referee: Tarek Magdy |
Note: The match is held at Al Salam Stadium instead of Cairo International Stadium.

==== Championship Round ====
| Pos | Team | Pld | W | D | L | GF | GA | GD | Pts | Qualification |
|---|---|---|---|---|---|---|---|---|---|---|
| 1 | Al Ahly (C) | 8 | 6 | 1 | 1 | 22 | 9 | +13 | 58 (Note: Al Ahly were initially deducted three points for refusing to play their away fixture against Zamalek, scheduled to be played on 11 March 2025. The points deduction was later cancelled by the Egyptian Premier League.) | Qualification for the Champions League first or second round |
| 2 | Pyramids | 8 | 4 | 2 | 2 | 15 | 10 | +5 | 56 | Qualification for the Champions League first or second round |
| 3 | Zamalek | 8 | 4 | 3 | 1 | 14 | 6 | +8 | 47 | Qualification for the Confederation Cup first or second round |
| 4 | Al Masry | 8 | 3 | 3 | 2 | 10 | 9 | +1 | 42 | Qualification for the Confederation Cup first or second round |
| 5 | National Bank of Egypt SC | 8 | 2 | 3 | 3 | 13 | 12 | +1 | 38 | |

Source: Soccerway (championship round)
Rules for classification: 1) Points; 2) Goal difference; 3) Goals scored; 4) Play-off tie.
(Note: Clubs qualified for this phase with the full regular season points they got, but without goals for or against)
(C) Champions

===== Results Summary =====
| Overall | | | | | | | | Home | | | | | | Away | | | | | |
| Pld | W | D | L | GF | GA | GD | Pts | W | D | L | GF | GA | GD | W | D | L | GF | GA | GD |
|---|---|---|---|---|---|---|---|---|---|---|---|---|---|---|---|---|---|---|---|
| 2 | 0 | 1 | 1 | 1 | 4 | −3 | 1 | 0 | 0 | 0 | 0 | 0 | 0 | 0 | 1 | 1 | 1 | 4 | −3 |

Last updated: 14 April 2025.

===== Matches =====
| 11 March 2025 1 | Zamalek | 3–0; Awarded | Al Ahly | Cairo |
| 21:30 UTC+2 | | Report | | Stadium: Cairo International Stadium |
Note: The match was cancelled and awarded to Zamalek after Al Ahly refused to show up as scheduled, citing concerns with the Egyptian officiating crew.

| 12 April 2025 2 | Pyramids | 1–1 | Al Ahly | Cairo |
| 19:00 UTC+2 | Chibi 85' | Report | Reda 90+6' | Stadium: 30 June Stadium; Referee: Danny Makkelie (Netherlands) |

| 30 April 2025 3 | Petrojet | 2–3 | Al Ahly | Cairo |
| 19:00 UTC+2 | El Metwaly 45' (pen.); Emmanuel 45+5' | Report | Abou Ali 10'; El Solia 15'; Gradišar 63' | Stadium: Petrosport Stadium |

| 4 May 2025 4 | Al Ahly | 5–0 | Haras El Hodoud | Cairo |
| 19:00 UTC+2 | Mohamed 9'; Koka 27'; Abou Ali 55'; El Shahat 73'; Hany 90+4' | Report | | Stadium: Al Salam Stadium |

| 8 May 2025 5 | Al Ahly | 4–2 | Al Masry | Cairo |
| 19:00 UTC+2 | Ashour 35', 79' (pen.); Mohamed 45+3'; Abou Ali 58' | Report | Mohsen 6'; Ben Youssef 81' | Stadium: Al Salam Stadium |

| 13 May 2025 6 | Ceramica Cleopatra | 0–1 | Al Ahly | Cairo |
| 16:00 UTC+2 | | Report | Bencharki 20' | Stadium: Arab Contractors Stadium |

| 17 May 2025 7 | Al Ahly | 2–1 | National Bank of Egypt | Cairo |
| 19:00 UTC+2 | Ashour 21'; Abou Ali 90+6' | Report | Annor 45+1' | Stadium: Al Salam Stadium |

| 28 May 2025 8 | Al Ahly | 6–0 | Pharco | Cairo |
| 19:00 UTC+2 | Abou Ali 10', 33', 61', 66'; El Shahat 75'; Ashour 90+3' | Report | | Stadium: Al Salam Stadium |

=== Egyptian League Cup ===
==== Group stage ====
| Pos | Team | Pld | W | D | L | GF | GA | GD | Pts | Qualification |
|---|---|---|---|---|---|---|---|---|---|---|
| 1 | Tala'ea El Gaish | 3 | 2 | 1 | 0 | 5 | 2 | +3 | 7 | Advance to knockout stage |
| 2 | ENPPI | 3 | 2 | 0 | 1 | 2 | 1 | +1 | 6 | Advance to knockout stage |
| 3 | Pharco | 3 | 1 | 1 | 1 | 3 | 3 | 0 | 4 | |
| 4 | Al Ahly | 3 | 0 | 0 | 3 | 2 | 6 | −4 | 0 | |

Source: EPL
Rules for classification: Group stage tiebreakers

| 20 March 2025 1 | Al Ahly | 0–1 | ENPPI | Cairo |
| | | | | Stadium: Cairo International Stadium |

| 24 March 2025 2 | Tala'ea El Gaish | 3–1 | Al Ahly | Cairo |
| | | | | Stadium: Military Academy Stadium |

| 17 April 2025 3 | Al Ahly | 1–2 | Pharco | Cairo |
| | | | | Stadium: Cairo International Stadium |

=== Egyptian Super Cup ===
| 20 October 2024 Semi-finals | Al Ahly | 2–1 | Ceramica Cleopatra | Abu Dhabi, United Arab Emirates |
| 21:00 UTC+4 | Taher 1', 54'; Rabia (yellow card) 30'; Tawfik (yellow card) 42' | Report | Lakay 45+3' | Stadium: Mohammed bin Zayed Stadium; Referee: Ahmed El Ghandour |

| 24 October 2024 Final | Al Ahly | 0–0 (a.e.t.) (7–6 p) | Zamalek | Abu Dhabi, United Arab Emirates |
| 21:00 UTC+4 | Attia (yellow card) 26'; Tawfik (yellow card) 47'; Mohamed (yellow card) 51' | | Kamal (yellow card) 24'; Maher (yellow card) 64'; El Said (yellow card) 68' | Stadium: Mohammed bin Zayed Stadium; Referee: Amin Omar |
| | Penalties |
| | Afsha (penalty scored); Kamal (penalty scored); Attia (penalty scored); El Solia (penalty scored); Slim (penalty missed); Tau (penalty scored); Aymen (penalty missed); Attiyat Allah (penalty scored); El Shahat (penalty scored) | | (penalty scored) El Said; (penalty missed) Mathlouthi; (penalty scored) Abdelmaguid; (penalty scored) Mansi; (penalty scored) Zizo; (penalty scored) Hamdi; (penalty missed) Shikabala; (penalty scored) Michalak; (penalty missed) Gaber |

=== CAF Champions League ===
==== Second round ====
| 15 September 2024 First leg | Gor Mahia (Kenya) | 0–3 | (Egypt) Al Ahly | Nairobi, Kenya |
| 15:00 UTC+3 | | | Rabia 14'; Tau 16', 74' | Stadium: Nyayo National Stadium; Referee: Steve Juan (Mauritius) |

| 21 September 2024 Second leg | Al Ahly (Egypt) | 3–0 (6–0 agg.) | (Kenya) Gor Mahia | Cairo |
| 19:00 UTC+3 | Rabia 23'; Abou Ali 54'; Taher 90+1' | | | Stadium: Cairo International Stadium; Attendance: 30,000; Referee: Jean-Jacques Ndala (DR Congo) |

==== Group stage ====
The group stage draw was held on 7 October 2024.

| Pos | Team | Pld | W | D | L | GF | GA | GD | Pts | Qualification | OPFC | AHL | CRB | SAB |
|---|---|---|---|---|---|---|---|---|---|---|---|---|---|---|
| 1 | (South Africa) Orlando Pirates | 6 | 4 | 2 | 0 | 10 | 4 | +6 | 14 | Advance to knockout stage | — | 0–0 | 2–1 | 3–0 |
| 2 | (Egypt) Al Ahly | 6 | 3 | 1 | 2 | 14 | 7 | +7 | 10 | Advance to knockout stage | 1–2 | — | 6–1 | 4–2 |
| 3 | (Algeria) CR Belouizdad | 6 | 3 | 0 | 3 | 11 | 10 | +1 | 9 | | 1–2 | 1–0 | — | 6–0 |
| 4 | (Ivory Coast) Stade d'Abidjan | 6 | 0 | 1 | 5 | 4 | 18 | −14 | 1 | | 1–1 | 1–3 | 0–1 | — |

Source: CAF
Rules for classification: Group stage tiebreakers

| 26 November 2024 1 | Al Ahly (Egypt) | 4–2 | (Ivory Coast) Stade d'Abidjan | Cairo |
| 18:00 UTC+2 | Kahraba 14', 48'; Afsha 21'; El Shahat 26' | Report | Koné 30'; Assalé 55' | Stadium: Cairo International Stadium; Attendance: 15,000; Referee: Patrice Tanguy Mebiame (Gabon) |

| 7 December 2024 2 | Orlando Pirates (South Africa) | 0–0 | (Egypt) Al Ahly | Johannesburg, South Africa |
| 15:00 UTC+2 | | | | Stadium: Orlando Stadium; Referee: Abdel Aziz Bouh (Mauritania) |

| 22 December 2024 3 | Al Ahly (Egypt) | 6–1 | (Algeria) CR Belouizdad | Cairo |
| 18:00 UTC+2 | Abou Ali 45+3', 51', 84'; El Shahat 56'; Tau 86'; Ashour 90+3' | Report | Mahious 21' | Stadium: Cairo International Stadium; Attendance: 15,000; Referee: Sadok Selmi (Tunisia) |

| 3 January 2025 4 | CR Belouizdad (Algeria) | 1–0 | (Egypt) Al Ahly | Algiers, Algeria |
| | Khacef 90+1' | Report | | Stadium: Stade du 5 Juillet; Referee: Omar Artan (Somalia) |

| 11 January 2025 5 | Stade d'Abidjan (Ivory Coast) | 1–3 | (Egypt) Al Ahly | Abidjan, Ivory Coast |
| 16:00 UTC+0 | Kore 26' | | Ashour 53', 73', 90+5' | Stadium: Felix Houphouet Boigny Stadium; Referee: Boubou Traoré (Mali) |

| 18 January 2025 6 | Al Ahly (Egypt) | 1–2 | (South Africa) Orlando Pirates | Cairo |
| 18:00 UTC+2 | El Shahat 69' | | Mofokeng 53'; Mabaso 83' | Stadium: Cairo International Stadium; Referee: Babacar Sarr (Mauritania) |

==== Knockout Stage ====
===== Quarter-finals =====
| 1 April 2025 First Leg | Al Ahly (Egypt) | 1–0 | (Sudan) Al Hilal | Cairo, Egypt |
| 21:00 UTC+2 | Hany 11' | Report | | Stadium: Cairo International Stadium; Attendance: 30,000; Referee: Alhadi Allaou Mahamat (Chad) |

| 8 April 2025 Second Leg | Al Hilal (Sudan) | 0–1 (0–2 agg.) | (Egypt) Al Ahly | Nouakchott, Mauritania |
| --:-- UTC+0 | | Report | Ashour 80' | Stadium: Cheikha Ould Boïdiya Stadium (Note: Al Hilal will play their knockout stage home matches at Cheikha Ould Boïdiya Stadium in Nouakchott (Mauritania), instead of their regular stadium, Al Hilal Stadium, Omdurman, due to the Sudanese civil war.); Referee: Pierre Atcho (Gabon) |

===== Semi-finals =====
| 19 April 2025 First Leg | Mamelodi Sundowns (South Africa) | 0–0 | (Egypt) Al Ahly | Pretoria, South Africa |
| 15:00 UTC+2 | | Report | | Stadium: Loftus Versfeld Stadium; Referee: Omar Artan (Somalia) |

| 25 April 2025 Second Leg | Al Ahly (Egypt) | 1–1 (1–1 (a) agg.) | (South Africa) Mamelodi Sundowns | Cairo, Egypt |
| 18:00 UTC+2 | Mohamed 24' | Report | Ibrahim 90' (o.g.) | Stadium: Cairo International Stadium; Referee: Dahane Beida (Mauritania) |

=== CAF Super Cup ===
| 27 September 2024 Final | Al Ahly (Egypt) | 1–1 (3–4 p) | (Egypt) Zamalek | Riyadh, Saudi Arabia |
| 21:00 UTC+3 | Tawfik (yellow card) 32'; Abou Ali 44' (pen.) | | Mathlouthi (yellow card) 37'; Jaziri (yellow card) 38'; Mansi 77'; Donga (yellow card) 89' | Stadium: Kingdom Arena; Referee: Mutaz Ibrahim (Libya) |
| | Penalties |
| | Rabia (penalty scored); Kamal (penalty scored); Attiyat Allah (penalty missed); Mohamed (penalty scored); Abou Ali (penalty missed) | | (penalty scored) El Said; (penalty scored) Mathlouthi; (penalty scored) Mansi; (penalty scored) Abdelmaguid |

=== FIFA Intercontinental Cup ===
Al Ahly qualified for this tournament as the 2023–24 CAF Champions League title holder.

==== Second round ====
FIFA African–Asian–Pacific Cup

| 29 October 2024 Second round | Al Ahly (Egypt) | 3–0 | (United Arab Emirates) Al Ain | Cairo |
| 20:00 UTC+3 | Abou Ali 32'; Ashour 55'; Afsha 90+2' (pen.) | Report | | Stadium: Cairo International Stadium; Attendance: 52,000; Referee: Halil Umut Meler (Turkey) |

==== Play-off ====
FIFA Challenger Cup

| 14 December 2024 | Pachuca (Mexico) | 0–0 (a.e.t.) (6–5 p) | (Egypt) Al Ahly | Stadium 974, Doha |
| 20:00 AST | | Report | | Attendance: 38,841; Referee: Alireza Faghani (Australia) |
| | Penalties |
| | Rondón (penalty missed); Bastón (penalty missed); Cabral (penalty scored); Idrissi (penalty scored); Deossa (penalty scored); Montiel (penalty scored); Rodríguez (penalty scored); Gil (penalty scored) | | (penalty scored) Magdy; (penalty scored) Rabia; (penalty scored) Attia; (penalty missed) Kahraba; (penalty missed) Kamal; (penalty scored) El Solia; (penalty scored) Tau; (penalty missed) Abdelfattah |

=== FIFA Club World Cup ===
==== Group Stage ====
| Pos | Team | Pld | W | D | L | GF | GA | GD | Pts | Qualification |
|---|---|---|---|---|---|---|---|---|---|---|
| 1 | (Brazil) Palmeiras | 3 | 1 | 2 | 0 | 4 | 2 | +2 | 5 (Note: Tied on head-to-head result (Inter Miami CF 2–2 Palmeiras). Overall goal difference was used as the tiebreaker.) | Advance to knockout stage |
| 2 | (United States) Inter Miami CF | 3 | 1 | 2 | 0 | 4 | 3 | +1 | 5 | Advance to knockout stage |
| 3 | (Portugal) Porto | 3 | 0 | 2 | 1 | 5 | 6 | −1 | 2 (Note: Tied on head-to-head result (Porto 4–4 Al Ahly). Overall goal difference was used as the tiebreaker.) | |
| 4 | (Egypt) Al Ahly | 3 | 0 | 2 | 1 | 4 | 6 | −2 | 2 | |

Source: FIFA
Rules for classification: Group stage tiebreakers
Notes:

| 15 June 2025 Group A | Al Ahly (Egypt) | 0–0 | (United States) Inter Miami CF | Miami Gardens, United States |
| 20:00 UTC−4 | Trézéguet (penalty missed) 43'; Attia (yellow card) 90+2' | Report | Avilés (yellow card) 25'; Redondo (yellow card) 31'; Busquets (yellow card) 86'; Suárez (yellow card) 90+3' | Stadium: Hard Rock Stadium; Attendance: 60,927; Referee: Alireza Faghani (Australia) |

| 19 June 2025 Group A | Palmeiras (Brazil) | 2–0 | (Egypt) Al Ahly | East Rutherford, United States |
| 12:00 UTC−4 | Raphael Veiga (yellow card) 39'; Giay (yellow card) 43'; Abou Ali 49' (o.g.); López 59'; Piquerez (yellow card) 74'; Ríos (yellow card) 90+5' | Report | Fathy (yellow card) 42'; Attiyat Allah (yellow card) 45+3'; Attia (yellow card) 79' | Stadium: MetLife Stadium; Attendance: 35,179; Referee: Anthony Taylor (England) |

| 23 June 2025 Group A | Porto (Portugal) | 4–4 | (Egypt) Al Ahly | East Rutherford, United States |
| 21:00 UTC−4 | Mora 23'; Gomes 50'; Aghehowa 53'; Pepê 89' | Report | Abou Ali 15', 45+2' (pen.), 51'; Ben Romdhane 64' | Stadium: MetLife Stadium; Attendance: 39,893; Referee: Jesús Valenzuela (Venezuela) |

== Statistics ==
=== Squad statistics ===
| No. | Pos | Nat | Player | Total | | EPL | | CAF CL | | Other^{1} | |
| No. | Pos | Nat | Player | Apps | Goals | Apps | Goals | Apps | Goals | Apps | Goals |
|---|---|---|---|---|---|---|---|---|---|---|---|
| 1 | GK | (Egypt) | Mohamed El Shenawy | 14 | 0 | 4 | 0 | 6 | 0 | 4 | 0 |
| 2 | DF | (Egypt) | Khaled Abdelfattah | 9 | 0 | 5 | 0 | 3 | 0 | 1 | 0 |
| 3 | DF | (Egypt) | Omar Kamal | 10 | 0 | 3 | 0 | 2 | 0 | 5 | 0 |
| 4 | DF | (Qatar) | Yousef Aymen | 2 | 0 | 1 | 0 | 0 | 0 | 1 | 0 |
| 5 | DF | (Egypt) | Ramy Rabia | 17 | 2 | 6 | 0 | 6 | 2 | 5 | 0 |
| 6 | DF | (Egypt) | Yasser Ibrahim | 12 | 0 | 3 | 0 | 4 | 0 | 5 | 0 |
| 7 | FW | (Egypt) | Kahraba | 9 | 2 | 3 | 0 | 5 | 2 | 1 | 0 |
| 8 | MF | (Egypt) | Akram Tawfik | 16 | 0 | 5 | 0 | 6 | 0 | 5 | 0 |
| 9 | FW | (Palestine) | Wessam Abou Ali | 14 | 8 | 4 | 2 | 5 | 4 | 5 | 2 |
| 10 | FW | (South Africa) | Percy Tau | 16 | 3 | 6 | 0 | 6 | 3 | 4 | 0 |
| 12 | FW | (Morocco) | Reda Slim | 9 | 0 | 3 | 0 | 4 | 0 | 2 | 0 |
| 13 | MF | (Egypt) | Marwan Attia | 15 | 0 | 5 | 0 | 5 | 0 | 5 | 0 |
| 14 | FW | (Egypt) | Hussein El Shahat | 17 | 4 | 6 | 2 | 6 | 2 | 5 | 0 |
| 15 | DF | (Morocco) | Achraf Dari | 4 | 0 | 1 | 0 | 2 | 0 | 1 | 0 |
| 16 | GK | (Egypt) | Hamza Alaa | 0 | 0 | 0 | 0 | 0 | 0 | 0 | 0 |
| 17 | MF | (Egypt) | Amr El Solia | 12 | 1 | 5 | 1 | 3 | 0 | 4 | 0 |
| 18 | DF | (Morocco) | Yahia Attiyat Allah | 17 | 1 | 6 | 1 | 6 | 0 | 5 | 0 |
| 19 | MF | (Egypt) | Afsha | 15 | 2 | 5 | 1 | 5 | 0 | 5 | 1 |
| 20 | MF | (Egypt) | Karim Nedvěd | 1 | 0 | 0 | 0 | 0 | 0 | 1 | 0 |
| 21 | DF | (Tunisia) | Ali Maâloul | 0 | 0 | 0 | 0 | 0 | 0 | 0 | 0 |
| 22 | MF | (Egypt) | Emam Ashour | 21 | 9 | 10 | 4 | 6 | 4 | 5 | 1 |
| 23 | MF | (Egypt) | Omar El Saaiy | 3 | 0 | 1 | 0 | 1 | 0 | 1 | 0 |
| 26 | MF | (Egypt) | Mostafa Abou El Khier | 0 | 0 | 0 | 0 | 0 | 0 | 0 | 0 |
| 28 | FW | (Egypt) | Karim Fouad | 0 | 0 | 0 | 0 | 0 | 0 | 0 | 0 |
| 29 | FW | (Egypt) | Taher Mohamed | 12 | 5 | 3 | 2 | 4 | 1 | 5 | 2 |
| 30 | DF | (Egypt) | Mohamed Hany | 3 | 0 | 0 | 0 | 2 | 0 | 1 | 0 |
| 31 | GK | (Egypt) | Mostafa Shobeir | 3 | 0 | 2 | 0 | 0 | 0 | 1 | 0 |
| 32 | FW | (Egypt) | Samir Mohamed | 3 | 0 | 3 | 0 | 0 | 0 | 0 | 0 |
| 33 | DF | (Egypt) | Karim El Debes | 6 | 0 | 3 | 0 | 3 | 0 | 0 | 0 |
| 36 | MF | (Egypt) | Koka | 13 | 0 | 5 | 0 | 4 | 0 | 4 | 0 |
| 37 | GK | (Egypt) | Mostafa Makhlouf | 0 | 0 | 0 | 0 | 0 | 0 | 0 | 0 |
| 38 | FW | (Egypt) | Mohamed Abdallah | 0 | 0 | 0 | 0 | 0 | 0 | 0 | 0 |

Last updated: 4 January 2025

^{1} Includes 2024 FIFA Intercontinental Cup, 2024–25 Egyptian Super Cup, 2024 CAF Super Cup, 2024–25 Egyptian League Cup and 2025 FIFA Club World Cup.

=== Goals ===
As of 23 June 2025

| Rank | Player | EPL | CAF CL | CAF SC | EFA SC | FIFA IC | EFL Cup | FCWC | Total |
|---|---|---|---|---|---|---|---|---|---|
| 1 | (Egypt) Emam Ashour | 13 | 5 | 0 | 0 | 1 | 0 | 0 | 19 |
| 1 | (Palestine) Wessam Abou Ali | 10 | 4 | 1 | 0 | 1 | 0 | 3 | 19 |
| 3 | (Egypt) Hussein El Shahat | 5 | 3 | 0 | 0 | 0 | 0 | 0 | 8 |
| 3 | (Egypt) Taher Mohamed | 4 | 2 | 0 | 2 | 0 | 0 | 0 | 8 |
| 5 | (Slovenia) Nejc Gradišar | 5 | 0 | 0 | 0 | 0 | 0 | 0 | 5 |
| 6 | (Egypt) Afsha | 2 | 1 | 0 | 0 | 1 | 0 | 0 | 4 |
| 7 | (Morocco) Achraf Bencharki | 3 | 0 | 0 | 0 | 0 | 0 | 0 | 3 |
| 7 | (Egypt) Ramy Rabia | 1 | 2 | 0 | 0 | 0 | 0 | 0 | 3 |
| 7 | (South Africa) Percy Tau | 0 | 3 | 0 | 0 | 0 | 0 | 0 | 3 |
| 10 | (Egypt) Amr El Solia | 2 | 0 | 0 | 0 | 0 | 0 | 0 | 2 |
| 10 | (Egypt) Kahraba | 0 | 2 | 0 | 0 | 0 | 0 | 0 | 2 |
| 10 | (Egypt) Mohamed Hany | 1 | 1 | 0 | 0 | 0 | 0 | 0 | 2 |
| 10 | (Egypt) Marwan Attia | 2 | 0 | 0 | 0 | 0 | 0 | 0 | 2 |
| 10 | (Egypt) Ahmed Reda | 2 | 0 | 0 | 0 | 0 | 0 | 0 | 2 |
| 15 | (Morocco) Yahya Attiyat Allah | 1 | 0 | 0 | 0 | 0 | 0 | 0 | 1 |
| 15 | (Egypt) Ahmed Nabil Koka | 1 | 0 | 0 | 0 | 0 | 0 | 0 | 1 |
| 15 | (Egypt) Adam Samir | 0 | 0 | 0 | 0 | 0 | 1 | 0 | 1 |
| 18 | (Tunisia) Mohamed Ali Ben Romdhane | 0 | 0 | 0 | 0 | 0 | 0 | 1 | 1 |
| Total | | 52 | 23 | 1 | 2 | 3 | 1 | 0 | 86 |

==== Hat-tricks ====
| Player | Against | Result | Date | Competition | Ref |
|---|---|---|---|---|---|
| (Palestine) Wessam Abou Ali | (Algeria) CR Belouizdad | 6–1 (H) | 22 December 2024 | Champions League | |
| (Egypt) Emam Ashour | (Ivory Coast) Stade d'Abidjan | 1–3 (A) | 11 January 2025 | Champions League | |
| (Palestine) Wessam Abou Ali | (Egypt) Pharco | 6–0 (H) | 28 May 2025 | Egyptian Premier League | |
| (Palestine) Wessam Abou Ali | (Portugal) Porto | 4–4 (N) | 23 June 2025 | FIFA Club World Cup | |

(H) – Home; (A) – Away (N) – Neutral

=== Assists ===
As of 20 January 2025

| Rank | Player | EPL | CAF CL | CAF SC | EFA SC | FIFA IC | EFL Cup | FCWC | Total |
|---|---|---|---|---|---|---|---|---|---|
| 1 | (Egypt) Karim El Debes | 2 | 2 | 0 | 0 | 0 | 0 | 0 | 4 |
| 2 | (Morocco) Yahia Attiyat Allah | 0 | 2 | 0 | 1 | 0 | 0 | 0 | 3 |
| 2 | (Egypt) Taher Mohamed | 1 | 1 | 0 | 0 | 1 | 0 | 0 | 3 |
| 2 | (Egypt) Emam Ashour | 2 | 1 | 0 | 0 | 0 | 0 | 0 | 3 |
| 2 | (Egypt) Afsha | 1 | 2 | 0 | 0 | 0 | 0 | 0 | 3 |
| 6 | (Palestine) Wessam Abou Ali | 1 | 1 | 0 | 0 | 0 | 0 | 0 | 2 |
| 6 | (Egypt) Khaled Abdelfattah | 0 | 2 | 0 | 0 | 0 | 0 | 0 | 2 |
| 8 | (Egypt) Omar Kamal | 1 | 0 | 0 | 0 | 0 | 0 | 0 | 1 |
| 8 | (Egypt) Hussein El Shahat | 1 | 0 | 0 | 0 | 0 | 0 | 0 | 1 |
| 8 | (Egypt) Kahraba | 0 | 1 | 0 | 0 | 0 | 0 | 0 | 1 |
| 8 | (South Africa) Percy Tau | 0 | 1 | 0 | 0 | 0 | 0 | 0 | 1 |
| 8 | (Egypt) Omar El Saaiy | 0 | 1 | 0 | 0 | 0 | 0 | 0 | 1 |
| Total | | 9 | 14 | 0 | 1 | 1 | 0 | 0 | 25 |

=== Clean sheets ===
As of 15 January 2025

| Rank | Player | EPL | CAF CL | CAF SC | EFA SC | FIFA IC | EFL Cup | FCWC | Total |
|---|---|---|---|---|---|---|---|---|---|
| 1 | (Egypt) Mohamed El Shenawy | 3 | 3 | 0 | 1 | 2 | 0 | 0 | 9 |
| 2 | (Egypt) Mostafa Shobier | 3 | 0 | 0 | 0 | 0 | 0 | 0 | 3 |
| Total | | 6 | 3 | 0 | 1 | 2 | 0 | 0 | 12 |
