= Mostafa Abou El Khier =

Egyptian footballer (born 2004)

Personal information
- Full name: Mostafa Abou El Khier Afifi Gelany Afifi
- Date of birth: 9 January 2004 (age 22)
- Place of birth: Agouza, Giza, Egypt
- Height: 1.76 m (5 ft 9 in)
- Position: Midfielder

Team information
- Current team: Al Masry
- Number: 26

Youth career
- 2011–2024: Al Ahly Youth Team

Senior career*
Years	Team	Apps	(Gls)
2023–2025	Al Ahly	3	(0)
2025–	Al Masry	2	(0)

International career
2022–	Egypt U20		
- * Club domestic league appearances and goals as of 20:16, 16 September 2024 (UTC)

Mostafa Abou El Khier Afifi Gelany Afifi (Arabic: مُصْطَفَى أَبُو الْخَيْر عَفِيفِيّ جِيلَانِيّ عَفِيفِيّ; born 9 January 2004) is an Egyptian professional footballer who plays as a midfielder for the Egyptian Premier League club Al Masry.

== Club career ==
Abou El Khair began his career at the Ard Al Liwaa Academy and was chosen by Abdel Nabi Ashour to join the Red Castle in 2011, Abou El Khair believes that the duo Mohamed Sharaf and Yasser Rayyan were the ones who most influenced his career during his time with Al Ahly’s youth team.

Abou El Khair was registered in Al-Ahly's African roster during the winter registration period, along with six young players and Wessam Abou Ali.

Abou El Khair plays in the defensive midfield position, but he is good at playing in more than one position.

== Career statistics ==
=== Club ===
As of 16 September 2024

Appearances and goals by club, season and competition
Club	Season	League			Cup		Continental		Other		Total	
Club	Season	Division	Apps	Goals	Apps	Goals	Apps	Goals	Apps	Goals	Apps	Goals
Al Ahly	2023–24	EPL	3	0	0	0	0	0	0	0	3	0
Al Ahly	2024–25	EPL	0	0	0	0	0	0	0	0	0	0
Career total			3	0	0	0	0	0	0	0	3	0

== Honors and achievements ==
Al Ahly

- Egyptian Premier League: 2023–24
- CAF Champions League: 2023–24
- Egyptian Super Cup: 2024
- FIFA African–Asian–Pacific Cup: 2024
