= Samir Mohamed =

Egyptian footballer (born 2003)

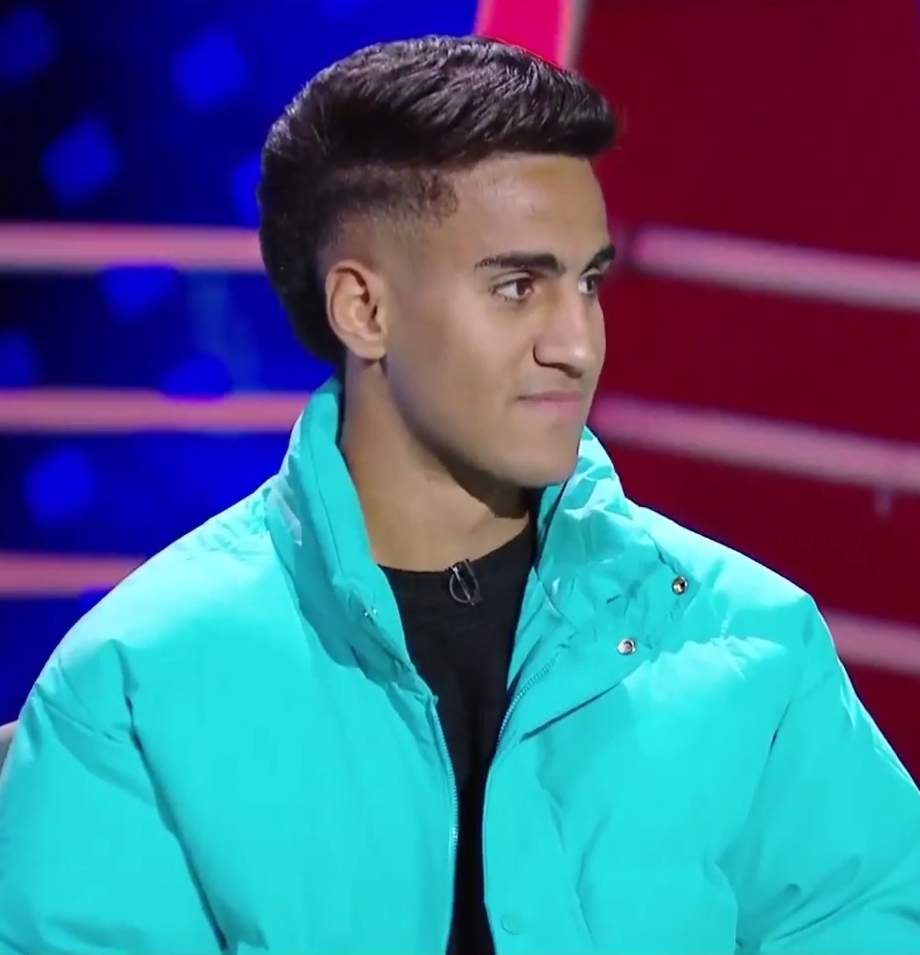
- Samir at Al Ahly TV in 2024

Personal information
- Full name: Samir Mohamed El Sayed Abdelaziz Galal
- Date of birth: 4 September 2003 (age 23)
- Place of birth: Tanta, Egypt
- Height: 1.78 m (5 ft 10 in)
- Position: Striker

Team information
- Current team: Al Ahly
- Number: 32

Youth career
- 2014–2019: Tanta
- 2019–2024: Al Ahly

Senior career*
Years	Team	Apps	(Gls)
2024–	Al Ahly	2	(0)
2024–	→ Petrojet SC (loan)		
- * Club domestic league appearances and goals

Samir Mohamed El Sayed Abdelaziz Galal (Arabic: سمير محمد; born 4 September 2003) is an Egyptian professional footballer who plays as a striker for Egyptian Premier League club Al Ahly.

== Career statistics ==
=== Club ===
As of 1 December 2024

Appearances and goals by club, season and competition
Club	Season	League			Cup		Continental		Other		Total	
Club	Season	Division	Apps	Goals	Apps	Goals	Apps	Goals	Apps	Goals	Apps	Goals
Al Ahly	2024–25	EPL	2	0	0	0	0	0	0	0	2	0
Career total			2	0	0	0	0	0	0	0	2	0

== Honours ==
Al Ahly

- Egyptian Super Cup: 2024
- FIFA African–Asian–Pacific Cup: 2024
