= Mostafa Makhlouf =

Egyptian footballer (born 2003)

Mostafa Makhlouf مُصْطَفَى مَخْلُوف
Personal information
- Full name: Mostafa Mohamed Makhlouf Amin
- Date of birth: 11 March 2003 (age 23)
- Place of birth: Giza, Egypt
- Height: 1.85 m (6 ft 1 in)
- Position: Goalkeeper

Team information
- Current team: Al Ahly
- Number: 37

Youth career
- 2016–2021: Tersana
- 2021–2024: Al Ahly

Senior career*
Years	Team	Apps	(Gls)
2023–	Al Ahly	3	(0)
2025-	→ Modern Sport FC (loan)	0	(0)

International career
2022–2023	Egypt U20	3	(0)
- * Club domestic league appearances and goals as of 09:51, 17 September 2024 (UTC)

Mostafa Mohamed Makhlouf Amin (Arabic: مُصْطَفَى مُحَمَّد مَخْلُوف أَمِين; born 11 March 2003) is an Egyptian professional footballer who plays as a goalkeeper for Egyptian Premier League club Al Ahly and the Egypt U20.

== Career ==
=== Club ===
He began his football career in his hometown of Giza in an academy, then after that he joined a small club in Helwan called Siegwart, after which he joined the ranks of Tersana in the 2003 team.

Makhlouf's level made him promoted to the first team at Tersana, as the player is distinguished by his great height, and this made some compare the young player to Al-Ahly's first goalkeeper, Mohamed El Shenawy.

Makhlouf talked about joining Al-Ahly club, saying: “Al-Ahly negotiated with me after a video I sent to the coach of the 2003 team in Al-Ahly, who was impressed by my abilities. The video was shown to Khaled Bebo, director of the youth sector, who was enthusiastic about contracting with me, and I did not think about any other offers, the most important of which was Zamalek.” And Pharco, but my family and I belong to Al Ahly Club, so I did not think about other offers.”

The Belgian Michel Iannacone, Al Ahly club’s goalkeeping coach, commented on the reason for hiring Mostafa Makhlouf to join the first team: “Mostafa Makhlouf has the abilities and capabilities of a good goalkeeper and is going well in training. "

=== International ===
Mostafa, the goalkeeper of the first football team at Al-Ahly Club, announced that he will join the Egypt national football team during the June 2023 camp, in preparation for the matches against Guinea and South Sudan.

Mustafa Makhlouf wrote on his official account on the social networking site “Facebook”: “Thank God I joined the national first team.”

Rui Vitoria, the ex coach of the Egyptian national team, had previously announced that he would include some players from the 2003 team during June 2023 camp.

Ahmed Nader Hawash, the player for Enppi Club, revealed that he received a call-up to join the Egyptian national team during the June 2023 camp.

== Career statistics ==
=== Club ===
As of 16 September 2024

Appearances and goals by club, season and competition
Club	Season	League			Cup		Continental		Other		Total	
Club	Season	Division	Apps	Goals	Apps	Goals	Apps	Goals	Apps	Goals	Apps	Goals
Al Ahly	2022–23	Egyptian Premier League	0	0	0	0	0	0	0	0	0	0
Al Ahly	2023–24	Egyptian Premier League	3	0	0	0	0	0	0	0	3	0
Al Ahly	2024–25	Egyptian Premier League	0	0	0	0	0	0	0	0	0	0
Career total			3	0	0	0	0	0	0	0	3	0

== Honors and achievements ==
Al Ahly

- Egyptian Premier League: 2022–23, 2023–24, 2024–25
- Egypt Cup: 2022–23
- Egyptian Super Cup: 2023, 2024
- CAF Champions League: 2023–24
- FIFA African–Asian–Pacific Cup: 2024
