= Karim El Debes =

Egyptian footballer (born 2003)

Karim El Debes كريم الدبيس
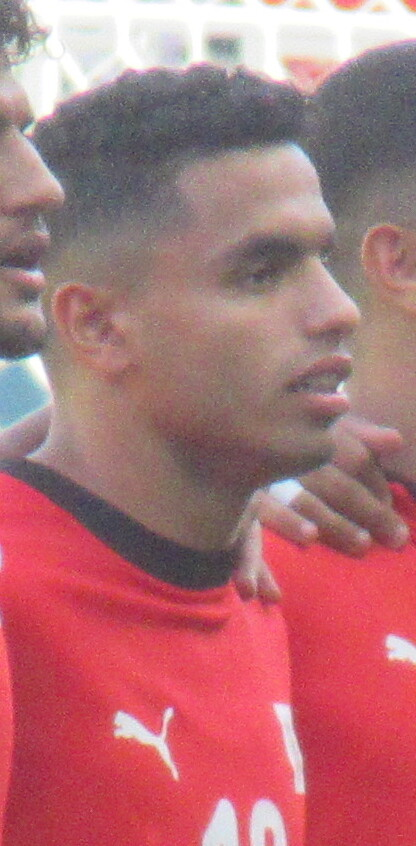
- El Debes lining up for Egypt Olympic at the 2024 Summer Olympics

Personal information
- Full name: Karim Mohamed Abdelhamid Hassan
- Date of birth: 3 June 2003 (age 23)
- Place of birth: Shibin El Qanater, Egypt
- Height: 1.76 m (5 ft 9 in)
- Position: Left-back

Team information
- Current team: Ceramica Cleopatra FC
- Number: 33

Youth career
- Shibin El Qanater
- 2013–2018: Al Mokawloon
- 2018–2020: Wadi Degla

Senior career*
Years	Team	Apps	(Gls)
2020–2022	Wadi Degla	22	(1)
2022–2025	Al Ahly	8	(0)
2025–	Ceramica Cleopatra FC	5	(0)

International career
2022–2023	Egypt U20	3	(0)
2023-	Egypt U23	12	(0)
- * Club domestic league appearances and goals

Karim Mohamed Abdelhamid M Hassan (Arabic: كريم محمد عبد الحميد حسن; born 3 June 2003) is an Egyptian professional footballer who plays as a Left-back for Ceramica Cleopatra FC on loan from Egyptian Premier League club Al Ahly and the Egypt U20.

== Club career ==
Born in Shibin El Qanater, El Debes began his career with the local side by the same name, before joining Al Mokawloon, where he spent five years. He joined Wadi Degla in 2018, being promoted to the first team squad in 2020. After impressive performances for Wadi Degla, despite the side being relegated to the Egyptian Second Division, he trialled with Belgian side K.V. Kortrijk, Italian side Udinese and Greek side Olympiacos.

On 22 September 2022, El Debes' agent stated that he would move to Egyptian Premier League champions Al Ahly. El Debes confirmed this himself only four day later. He announced his departure from Wadi Degla via Instagram on 3 October 2022, by which point Zamalek had also been touted as a potential new club for El Debes.

The move to Al Ahly was completed in October 2022, with El Debes scoring on his debut for the youth team in a 3–0 win against Petrojet. In January 2023, El Debes trained with the Al Ahly first team for the first time, with both Al Ittihad Alexandria and National Bank of Egypt looking to secure a loan deal for the winger.

== International career ==
El Debes represented Egypt's under-20 side at their unsuccessful 2023 U-20 Africa Cup of Nations campaign, in which they were knocked out in the group stage, only collecting one point for a 0–0 draw with Mozambique.

== Career statistics ==
=== Club ===
As of 13 May 2021.

Appearances and goals by club, season and competition
Club	Season	League			Cup		Continental		Other		Total	
Club	Season	Division	Apps	Goals	Apps	Goals	Apps	Goals	Apps	Goals	Apps	Goals
Wadi Degla	2020–21	Egyptian Premier League	22	1	3 (Note: Appearances in the Egypt Cup)	0	–		0	0	25	1
Wadi Degla	2021–22	Egyptian Second Division	–		0	0	–		0	0	0	0
Wadi Degla	Total		22	1	3	0	0	0	0	0	25	1
Al Ahly	2022–23	Egyptian Premier League	0	0	0	0	0	0	0	0	0	0
Career total			22	1	3	0	0	0	0	0	25	1

== Honours ==
Al Ahly

- Egyptian Premier League: 2022–23, 2023–24, 2024–25
- Egypt Cup: 2021–22, 2022–23
- Egyptian Super Cup: 2022, 2023, 2023–24, 2024–25
- CAF Champions League: 2022–23, 2023-24
- FIFA African–Asian–Pacific Cup: 2024
