= Yahya Attiyat Allah =

Moroccan footballer (born 1995)

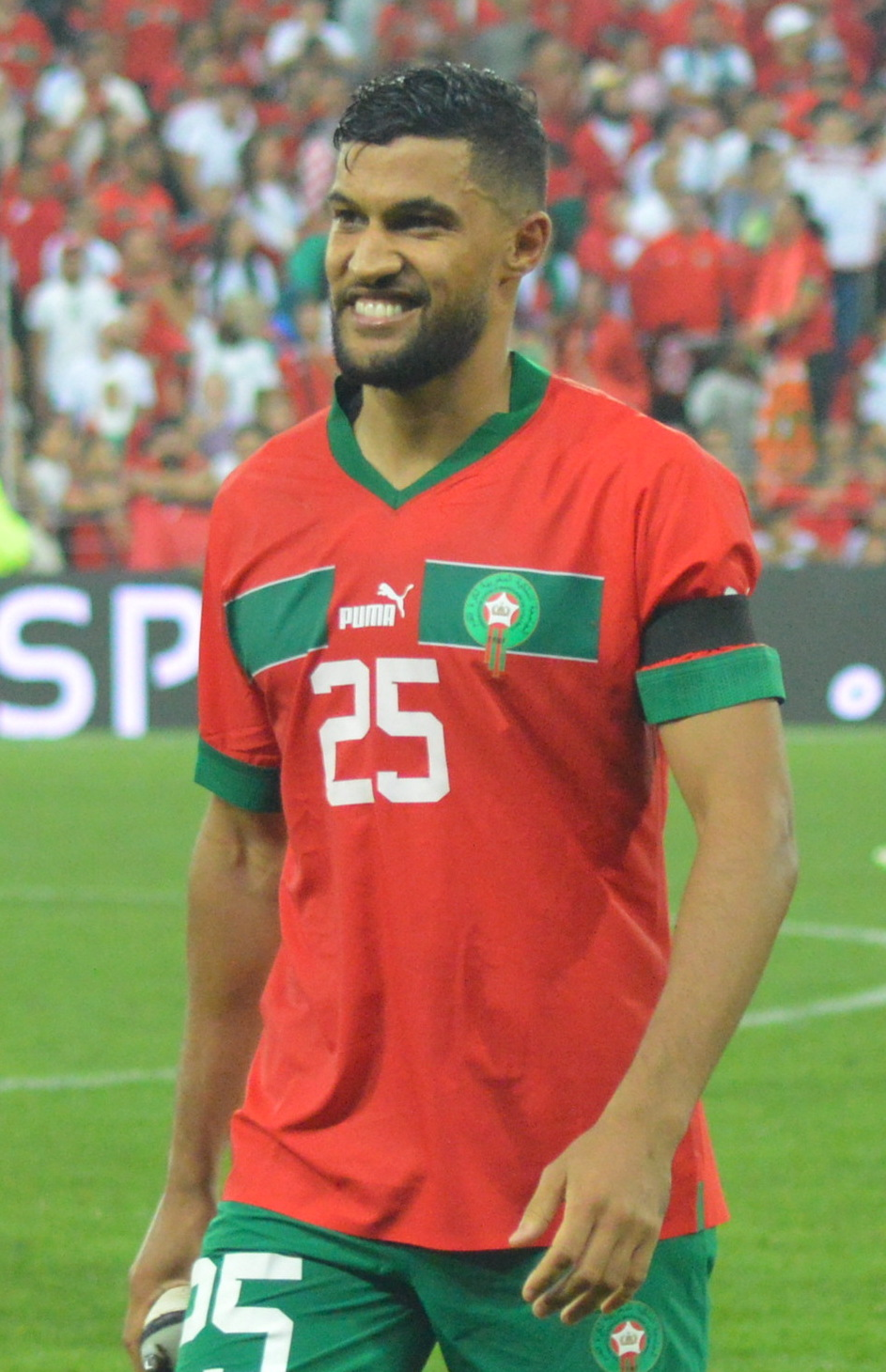
- Attiyat Allah with Morocco in 2023

Personal information
- Full name: Yahya Attiyat Allah El Idrissi
- Date of birth: 2 March 1995 (age 31)
- Place of birth: Safi, Morocco
- Height: 1.76 m (5 ft 9 in)
- Positions: Left-back; left winger

Team information
- Current team: Wydad AC

Youth career
- –2013: Olympic Safi

Senior career*
Years	Team	Apps	(Gls)
2013–2019	Olympic Safi	115	(10)
2019–2020	Volos	8	(1)
2020–2024	Wydad AC	101	(7)
2024–2026	Sochi	18	(1)
2024–2025	→ Al Ahly (loan)	8	(1)
2026–	Wydad AC	0	(0)

International career^{‡}
2011–2012	Morocco U17	5	(0)
2015–	Morocco U23	3	(0)
2018–2020	Morocco A'	4	(0)
2022–2024	Morocco	22	(0)
- * Club domestic league appearances and goals as of 8 November 2025 ‡ National team caps and goals as of 11 June 2025

Yahya Attiyat Allah El Idrissi (Arabic: يَحْيَى عَطِيَّة الله الْإِدْرِيسِيّ; born 2 March 1995) is a Moroccan professional footballer who plays as a left-back or left winger for club Wydad.

He began his professional career playing for Olympic Safi. Then went on to spend one season of his career in Europe, playing for the Greek side Volos, before returning to playing in the Moroccan side Wydad.

In 2024, Yahya signed with Egyptian Premier League club Al Ahly.

== Club career ==
In the inaugural season of the African Football League, Attiat-Allah went on to score the third goal in a 3–0 home victory against Nigerian side Enyimba, after claiming a 1–0 win away, thus qualifying them to the semi-finals.

On 1 November 2023, Attait-Allah was nominated for the 2023 Interclub Player of the Year by CAF.

On 8 February 2024, Attiyat Allah signed with Russian Premier League club Sochi. On 13 April 2024, he scored his first goal for Sochi in a 1–0 victory over Spartak Moscow.

== International career ==
Attait-Allah played throughout his career in U13, U15 and U17, and U23, being regularly called up to the national team. In 2015, he made his debut for the Olympic national team.

On 17 March 2022, he was selected by Vahid Halilhodžić for a double confrontation against the Democratic Republic of Congo team counting for the 2022 World Cup play-offs. In the return match in Casablanca, Attiat-Allah came on in the 81st minute in place of Adam Masina and won the match with a score of 4–1, thus qualifying to the 2022 FIFA World Cup.

=== 2022 FIFA World Cup ===
On 10 November 2022, he was named in Morocco's 26-man squad for the 2022 FIFA World Cup in Qatar. Attiat-Allah took part in several matches during the tournament. He was the second option to the left-back position after Noussair Mazraoui. He managed to play only two matches in the group stage, his first against Belgium and second against Canada. He came in as a replacement in the round of 16 against Spain. He made his first start against Portugal after Mazraoui got injured and gave the assist for the winning goal scored with a header by Youssef En-Nesyri. He went on to play in the semi-final against France (2–0 defeat) and the third place match against Croatia (2–1 defeat). Morocco ended its journey in fourth place in the competition.

=== 2023 ===
On 28 December 2023, Attait-Allah was amongst the 27 players selected by coach Walid Regragui to represent Morocco in the 2023 Africa Cup of Nations.

== Career statistics ==
=== Club ===
As of match played 8 November 2025

Appearances and goals by club, season and competition
Club	Season	League			Cup		Continental		Other		Total	
Club	Season	Division	Apps	Goals	Apps	Goals	Apps	Goals	Apps	Goals	Apps	Goals
Olympic Safi	2014–15	Botola	26	2	—		—		—		26	2
Olympic Safi	2015–16	Botola	16	0	—		—		—		16	0
Olympic Safi	2016–17	Botola	19	0	—		—		—		19	0
Olympic Safi	2017–18	Botola	22	4	1	1	—		—		23	5
Olympic Safi	2018–19	Botola	28	4	0	0	—		—		28	4
Olympic Safi	Total		111	10	1	1	—		—		112	11
Volos	2019–20	Super League Greece	8	1	2	0	—		—		10	1
Wydad	2019–20	Botola	14	0	0	0	3 (Note: Appearances in CAF Champions League)	0	—		17	0
Wydad	2020–21	Botola	25	2	1	0	11	0	—		37	2
Wydad	2021–22	Botola	24	1	3	0	13	0	—		40	2
Wydad	2022–23	Botola	27	2	0	0	14	1	2 (Note: One appearance in CAF Super Cup, one appearance in FIFA Club World Cup)	0	43	3
Wydad	2022–23	Botola	11	2	0	0	12 (Note: Six appearances and one goal in CAF Champions League, six appearances and one goal in African Football League)	2	—		23	4
Wydad	Total		101	7	4	0	53	3	2	0	160	11
Sochi	2023–24	Russian Premier League	10	1	1	0	—		—		11	1
Sochi	2025–26	Russian Premier League	8	0	1	0	—		—		9	0
Sochi	Total		18	1	2	0	0	0	0	0	20	1
Al Ahly (loan)	2024–25	Egyptian Premier League	8	1	—		9 (Note: Eight appearances in CAF Champions League, one appearance in CAF Super Cup)	0	5 (Note: One appearance in FIFA Club World Cup, two appearances in FIFA Intercontinental Cup, two appearances in Egyptian Super Cup)	0	22	1
Career total			231	20	8	1	53	3	2	0	294	23

=== International ===
As of match played 11 June 2024

Appearances and goals by national team and year
National team	Year	Apps	Goals
Morocco	2022	10	0
Morocco	2023	5	0
Morocco	2024	7	0
Total		22	0

== Honours ==
Wydad AC

- Botola Pro : 2020–21, 2021–22
- CAF Champions League : 2021-22
- African Football League runner-up: 2023

Al Ahly

- Egyptian Premier League: 2024–25
- Egyptian Super Cup: 2024

Individual

- Botola Pro Team of the Season: 2021–22
- Wydad AC Player of the Season: 2021–22

Orders

- Order of the Throne: 2022
