= Ahmed Nabil Koka =

Egyptian footballer (born 2001)

Ahmed Nabil Koka أَحْمَد نَبِيل كُوكَا
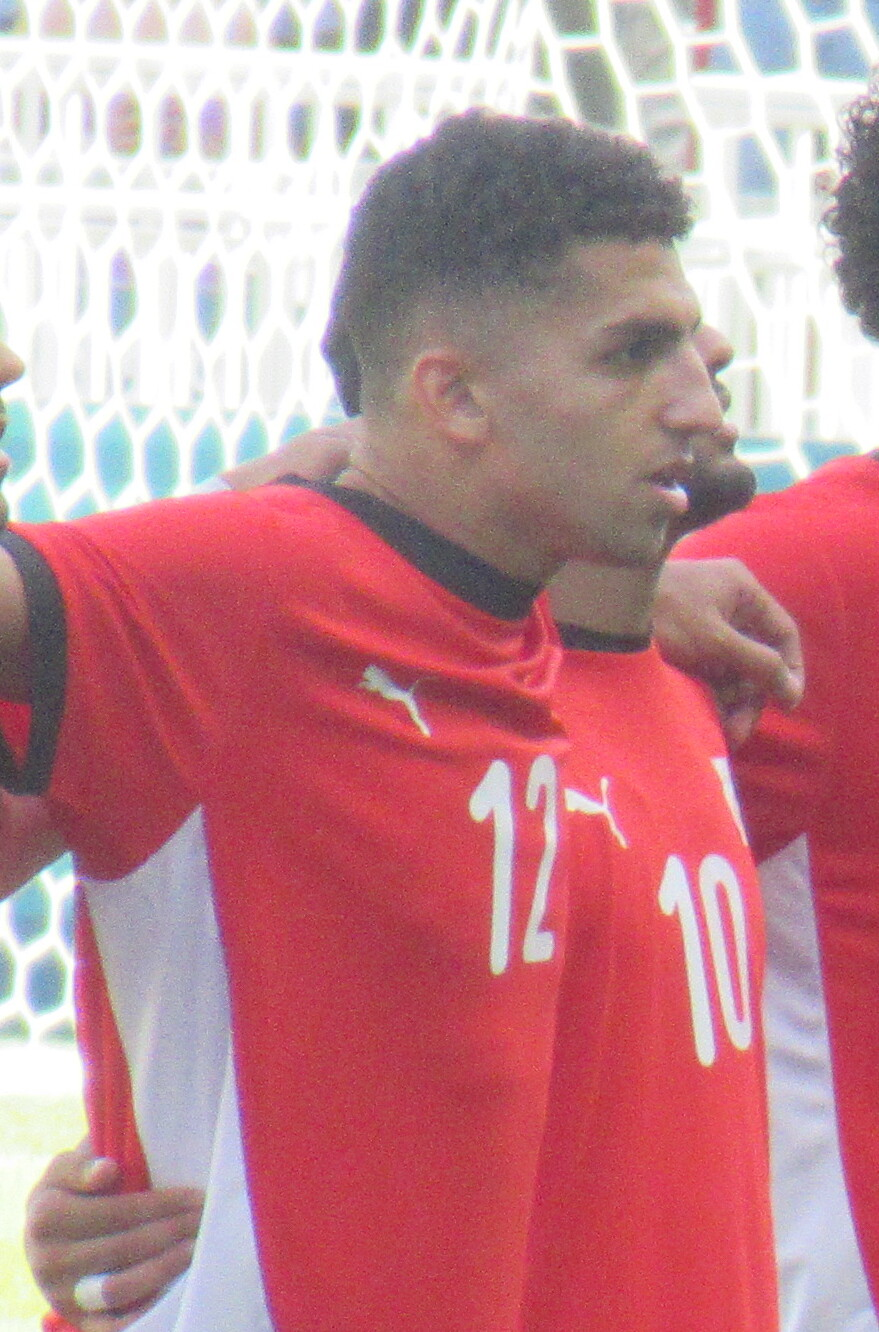
- Koka lining up for Egypt Olympic at the 2024 Summer Olympics

Personal information
- Full name: Ahmed Nabil Ashour Abdelaal
- Date of birth: 4 July 2001 (age 25)
- Place of birth: Cairo, Egypt
- Height: 1.70 m (5 ft 7 in)
- Position: Midfielder

Team information
- Current team: Al Ahly
- Number: 36

Youth career
- Red Sea Academy
- 2008–2020: Al Ahly

Senior career*
Years	Team	Apps	(Gls)
2020–	Al Ahly	50	(1)

International career
2020	Egypt U20	1	(0)
2023-2024	Egypt U23	13	(1)
2024-	Egypt	7	(0)
Medal record
Representing Egypt
U-23 Africa Cup of Nations
Runner-up	Morocco 2023	U-23 Team
- * Club domestic league appearances and goals

Ahmed Nabil Ashour Abdelaal (Arabic: أَحْمَد نَبِيل عَاشُور عَبْد الْعَال; born 4 July 2001), known as Ahmed Nabil Koka, is an Egyptian professional footballer who plays as a midfielder for Al Ahly and the Egypt national team.

== Club career ==
Having joined the academy of Al Ahly at the age of seven from the Red Sea Football Academy, Koka rose through the ranks to make his professional debut in the Egyptian Cup against Abu Qair Semad on 21 November 2020. Having struggled to establish himself as a first-team player, Koka contracted COVID-19 shortly after featuring in a 1–1 draw with Future on 26 December 2021, with Al-Ahly's medical staff estimating that he would return to first team training in March 2022. However, he went on to suffer with complications of the disease, and would not return to first team action until May of the same year, coming on as a late substitute in a CAF Champions League game against ES Sétif on 14 May.

Koka was injured again at the end of the 2021–22 season, suffering a hamstring injury in training, and missing the final games of the season against Pyramids and Zamalek. He would then miss the beginning of the 2022–23 season after suffering with a back muscle injury. He returned to the first team, but would be injured again in a game against ENPPI, being taken to the hospital after suffering an injury to his eye having been hit in the face from close range by the ball. He injured his back in a game against the National Bank of Egypt in late January 2023, and would miss almost six weeks before returning to the team in March 2023.

== Career statistics ==
=== Club ===
As of 29 June 2023.

Appearances and goals by club, season and competition
Club	Season	League			Cup		Continental		Other		Total	
Club	Season	Division	Apps	Goals	Apps	Goals	Apps	Goals	Apps	Goals	Apps	Goals
Al Ahly	2019–20	Egyptian Premier League	0	0	1 (Note: Appearances in the Egyptian Cup)	0	0	0	0	0	1	0
Al Ahly	2020–21	Egyptian Premier League	5	0	1	0	0	0	0	0	6	0
Al Ahly	2021–22	Egyptian Premier League	6	0	1	0	1 (Note: Appearances in the CAF Champions League)	0	0	0	8	0
Al Ahly	2022–23	Egyptian Premier League	5	0	0	0	3	0	0	0	8	0
Career total			16	0	3	0	4	0	0	0	23	0

== Honours ==
Al Ahly

- Egyptian Premier League: 2022–23
- Egypt Cup: 2021–22, 2022–23
- Egyptian Super Cup: 2023–24
- CAF Champions League: 2020–21, 2022–23, 2023–24
- FIFA African–Asian–Pacific Cup: 2024
