= Taher Mohamed =

Egyptian footballer (born 1997)

Taher Mohamed طَاهِر مُحَمَّد
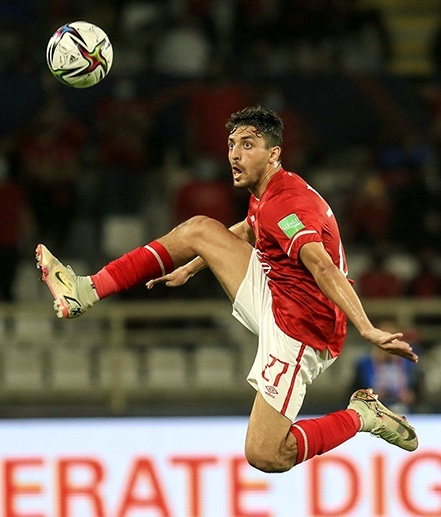
- Taher with Al Ahly at the 2021 FIFA Club World Cup

Personal information
- Full name: Taher Mohamed Ahmed Taher Mohamed Mahmoud
- Date of birth: 7 March 1997 (age 29)
- Place of birth: Cairo, Egypt
- Height: 1.86 m (6 ft 1 in)
- Position: Forward

Team information
- Current team: Al Ahly
- Number: 7

Youth career
- 2007–2014: El Mokawloon

Senior career*
Years	Team	Apps	(Gls)
2014–2020	El Mokawloon	87	(13)
2016–2017	→ Le Havre II (loan)	15	(1)
2020–	Al Ahly	209	(26)

International career^{‡}
2017	Egypt U20	6	(1)
2019	Egypt U23	3	(2)
2021	Egypt Olympic	4	(0)
2018–	Egypt	3	(1)
- * Club domestic league appearances and goals as of 22 September 2024 ‡ National team caps and goals as of 15 November 2024

Taher Mohamed Ahmed Taher Mohamed Mahmoud (Arabic: طَاهِر مُحَمَّد أَحْمَد طَاهِر مُحَمَّد مَحْمُود; born 7 March 1997) is an Egyptian professional footballer, who plays as a forward for Egyptian Premier League club Al Ahly and the Egypt national team.

== Profile ==
Taher started his early career in the Arab Contractors FC at age eight when he first joined the elder team of 96; he achieved the best player trophy in 2009, 2010, and 2012. In 2008, he participated with the Arab Contractors 1996 team in the Danone Nations cup held in Paris, where he showed a very high performance; in this competition, the famous Tunisian legend Al Zubair Baya announced on the Al Jazeera Satellite channel that he should be nominated as the best player in the championship. The French Legend Zinedine Zidane signed his T-shirt when he lost the title.

In 2013 the Arab Contractors FC "Mountain Wolves" head coach, Mohamed Radwan, selected him to join the first team as the youngest Egyptian Football player in the Egyptian premier league. He played his first official match against Al Ahly FC, "African Club of the Century," and his team won. Taher was trained by Egyptian trainer Hassan Shehata.

Taher joined every youth national team, starting with the 1995 Team under Alaa Maihoub, and the Olympic Team, under Hossam El Badry. He currently is the leader of the 1997 Team under Moatemed Gamal, who succeeded in qualifying for the African Nations Cup next year in Zambia. He scored the effective goal in Rwanda, giving the young Pharos an edge.

Taher finished his IB certificate in 2015 at his elite French School "Ecole Oasis" helping secure his career as a recognized footballer, during schooling he participated with his school in three main football events starting in 2008, where the school team won the competition of International schools held in Cairo with two personal titles: 'Best Player' and 'Top Scorer'. In 2012 the school crossed borders in the Mediterranean Cup held in Verona, Italy, where Taher achieved the title of 'Best Player in the Competition'. In 2013, the school team achieved the silver medal in the Valencia cup held in Spain.

In 2016 Taher started his first European transfer to Le Havre FC being, a one-year loan; the transfer was under the auspices of the Club Head Coach, Bob Bradley, who had the will to be having the player's efforts for one year, specially the club was competing to be upgraded to the French league 1st. Division as a target of the head coach.

In 2017/18, Taher, upon the request of the Arab Contractors FC, returned to his club as the club management objective for the season was to compete for the championship to return the club's trophies and victories being one of the top leading clubs in the African continent after suffering for several years.

Taher started this season 19/20 strongly with his club, the news is still informing that the player is under the focus of Al Ahly club, and Zamalek FC is still planning to achieve his services.

The new Mo Salah, as the local press describes him (and he is known as) Il Magico and the future of Egyptian football.

On 9 July, Al Ahly announced that they signed Taher Mohamed from Arab Contractors on a five-year deal with a fee of £E40m.

== International ==
He made his debut for Egypt national football team on 16 November 2018 in an Africa Cup of Nations qualifier against Tunisia, as an 86th-minute substitute for Amr Warda. Taher was among the final list of the Egyptian Olympic team that won the latest African cup held in Cairo in November 2019 and succeeded in qualifying to Tokyo 2020

== International press ==
In September 2016, US ESPN selected Taher Mohamed among the top 10 world football players eligible to rise with their national teams to the World Cup in Russia 2018.

== Career statistics ==
=== Club ===
As of match played 14 December 2024

Appearances and goals by club, season and competition
Club	Season	League			National cup (Note: Includes Egypt Cup)		Continental		Other		Total	
Club	Season	Division	Apps	Goals	Apps	Goals	Apps	Goals	Apps	Goals	Apps	Goals
El Mokawloon	2013–14	Egyptian Premier League	6	0	2	0	—		—		8	0
El Mokawloon	2014–15	Egyptian Premier League	15	2	2	0	—		—		17	2
El Mokawloon	2015–16	Egyptian Premier League	15	2	1	0	—		—		16	2
El Mokawloon	2017–18	Egyptian Premier League	19	3	1	0	—		—		20	3
El Mokawloon	2018–19	Egyptian Premier League	17	3	2	0	—		–		19	3
El Mokawloon	2019–20	Egyptian Premier League	15	3	1	0	—		—		16	3
El Mokawloon	Total		87	13	7	0	0	0	0	0	96	13
Le Havre II (loan)	2016–17	Championnat National 2	15	1	—		—		—		15	1
Al Ahly	2019–20	Egyptian Premier League	0	0	2	0	—		—		2	0
Al Ahly	2020–21	Egyptian Premier League	24	3	3	1	11 (Note: Appearances in CAF Champions League)	3	5 (Note: One appearance in Egyptian Super Cup, one appearance in CAF Super Cup, three appearances in FIFA Club World Cup)	0	43	7
Al Ahly	2021–22	Egyptian Premier League	14	2	2	0	12	1	5 (Note: One appearance in Egyptian Super Cup, one appearance and one goal in CAF Super Cup, three appearances in FIFA Club World Cup)	1	33	4
Al Ahly	2022–23	Egyptian Premier League	19	3	4	0	9	0	5 (Note: One appearance in Egyptian Super Cup, four appearances in FIFA Club World Cup)	0	37	3
Al Ahly	2023–24	Egyptian Premier League	17	2	—		10	0	8 (Note: Two appearances in Egyptian Super Cup, one appearance in CAF Super Cup, two appearances in African Football League, three appearances in FIFA Club World Cup)	0	35	2
Al Ahly	2024–25	Egyptian Premier League	3	2	0	0	4	1	5 (Note: Two appearances and two goals in Egyptian Super Cup, one appearance in CAF Super Cup, two appearances in FIFA Intercontinental Cup)	2	12	5
Al Ahly	Total		77	12	9	1	46	5	28	3	162	21
Career Total			179	26	16	1	46	5	28	3	273	35

=== International ===
As of match played 15 November 2024

National team	Year	Apps	Goals
Egypt U-20	2017	2 (Note: Two appearances in U-20 Africa Cup of Nations)	0
Egypt U-23	2018	1	1
Egypt U-23	2019	2	1
Egypt U-23	2021	4 (Note: Four appearances in the Olympic Games)	0
Egypt	2018	1	0
Egypt	2022	1	0
Egypt	2024	1	1
Total		12	3

As of match played 15 November 2024
Egypt score listed first, score column indicates score after each Mohamed goal

List of international goals scored by Taher Mohamed
No.	Date	Venue	Cap	Opponent	Score	Result	Competition	Ref.
1	15 November 2024	Estádio Nacional de Cabo Verde, Praia	3	Cape Verde	1–0	1–1	2025 Africa Cup of Nations qualification	

== Honours ==
=== Al Ahly ===
- Egyptian Premier League: 2022–23, 2023–24
- Egypt Cup: 2019–20, 2021–22, 2022–23
- Egyptian Super Cup: 2022, 2023, 2023–24, 2024
- CAF Champions League: 2020–21, 2022–23, 2023-24
- CAF Super Cup: 2021 (May), 2021 (Dec)
- FIFA African–Asian–Pacific Cup: 2024
