= Wessam Abou Ali =

Footballer (born 1999)

Personal information
- Full name: Wessam Haitham Mohammed Abou Ali
- Date of birth: 4 January 1999 (age 27)
- Place of birth: Aalborg, Denmark
- Height: 1.85 m (6 ft 1 in)
- Position: Striker

Team information
- Current team: Columbus Crew
- Number: 9

Youth career
- 2003–2009: B52/AFC
- 2009–2018: AaB

Senior career*
Years	Team	Apps	(Gls)
2018–2020	AaB	30	(2)
2019–2020	→ Vendsyssel (loan)	22	(11)
2020–2021	Silkeborg	13	(3)
2021–2023	Vendsyssel	41	(14)
2023–2024	IK Sirius	16	(10)
2024–2025	Al Ahly	35	(28)
2025–	Columbus Crew	12	(8)

International career^{‡}
2016	Denmark U17	3	(0)
2016–2017	Denmark U18	4	(0)
2018	Denmark U19	1	(1)
2019	Denmark U20	1	(0)
2024–	Palestine	11	(4)
- * Club domestic league appearances and goals as of 03:16, 13 April 2026 (UTC) ‡ National team caps and goals as of 23:17, 23 September 2025 (UTC)

Wessam Haitham Mohammed Abou Ali (Arabic: وسام هيثم محمد أبو علي; born 4 January 1999) is a professional footballer who plays as a striker for Major League Soccer club Columbus Crew. Born in Denmark, he plays for the Palestine national team.

== Club career ==
=== AaB ===
Starting out in local Aalborg club B52/AFC at age four, Abou Ali moved to the largest club in the region, AaB, six years later.

He made his senior Danish Superliga debut on 15 March 2018 against AC Horsens. He scored his first senior goal on 22 April 2018 against FC Midtjylland.

==== Loan to Vendsyssel ====
On 23 August 2019, Abou Ali was loaned out to Danish 1st Division club Vendsyssel FF for the rest of 2019. On 5 January 2020 it was confirmed, that he would continue at Vendsyssel for the rest of the season.

=== Silkeborg ===
On 9 September 2020, Abou Ali joined newly relegated Danish 1st Division club Silkeborg IF on a four-and-a-half-year contract until the end of 2024. He scored his first goal for his new club on 19 September in a 3–1 win versus Esbjerg. On 18 December, he scored a brace in a match against Skive IK.

=== Return to Vendsyssel ===
In the search for more playing time, Abou Ali returned to Vendsyssel FF on 1 September 2021, signing a deal until June 2025. During his debut against Lyngby Boldklub on 12 September, Abou Ali suddenly collapsed on the pitch and was brought to the hospital. Abou Ali came on from the bench in the half time, before collapsing in the 59th minute. Two days later, he was discharged from the hospital and began rehabilitation.

On 15 February 2022 in a friendly game against Dynamo Moscow, Abou Ali had to be taken from the field on a stretcher and driven to the hospital after suffering a punctured lung.

=== IK Sirius ===
On 13 July 2023, it was confirmed that Abou Ali had joined Swedish Allsvenskan club IK Sirius on a deal until the end of 2027. After only one training session with his new club, he started two days later on 15 July in the away match against Degerfors IF and scored the opening goal via a header to help lead his club to a 3–0 win.

=== Al Ahly ===
On 11 January 2024, Abou Ali joined Egyptian club Al Ahly by signing a four-and-a-half-year contract, for a reported fee of €2 million. On 23 February, he made his debut in a 1–0 away win over Medeama in the CAF Champions League. Four days later, he scored his first goals by netting a brace in a 5–1 victory over Baladiyat El Mahalla. On 26 April, he scored his first CAF Champions League goal in a 3–0 victory over TP Mazembe in the semi-finals second leg.

He achieved his first trophy with the club by winning the 2024 CAF Champions League final, defeating Espérance 1–0 on aggregate. He later secured the Egyptian Premier League title and finished as the top scorer with 18 goals despite joining mid-season.

In the final game of the 2024–25 season, Abou Ali scored four goals against Pharco to help the team capture the Egyptian Premier League title. On 23 June 2025, Abou Ali scored a hat-trick in Al Ahly's 4–4 draw against Porto in the 2025 FIFA Club World Cup. Scoring with both feet and his head, it was the first perfect hat-trick in the history of intercontinental club tournaments and the first hat-trick by an Asian player in a FIFA club competition. He was also awarded as the Superior Player of the Match for his performance.

=== Columbus Crew ===
On 26 July 2025, Abou Ali signed with Major League Soccer club Columbus Crew through the 2027 season with a club option for 2028, with the reported transfer fee being $7.5 million plus $1 million in add-ons. He made his debut with the club on 23 August 2025 in a 2–1 loss to the New England Revolution. After failing to score in his first two matches for his new club, Abou Ali found the net in each of his next three appearances before being forced off injured in the third, against Toronto FC, after suffering a hairline fracture to his right ankle. The injury ruled him out for the remainder of the season. Abou Ali finished his abbreviated campaign with three goals in five appearances.

== International career ==
Born in Denmark, Abou Ali is of Palestinian descent. He is a former youth international for Denmark but ultimately committed to the Palestinian national team. On 27 March 2024, the Palestinian Football Association announced FIFA's approval of his change of allegiance, paving the way for him to play with the Palestinian national team.

He made his debut on 6 June 2024 in a World Cup qualifier against Lebanon at the Jassim bin Hamad Stadium in Qatar. He started the game and was substituted in added time, as the game ended in a scoreless draw. Later that year, on 10 September, he scored his first international goal in a 3–1 defeat against Jordan during the World Cup qualifier third round. Abou Ali scored four goals for Palestine during the third round, but the team were eliminated after a draw in the last match against Oman.

== Career statistics ==
=== Club ===
As of match played 12 April 2026

Appearances and goals by club, season and competition
Club	Season	League			National cup (Note: Includes Danish Cup, Svenska Cupen, Egypt Cup)		Continental		Other		Total	
Club	Season	Division	Apps	Goals	Apps	Goals	Apps	Goals	Apps	Goals	Apps	Goals
AaB	2017–18	Danish Superliga	6	1	—		—		—		6	1
AaB	2018–19	Danish Superliga	22	1	1	2	—		—		23	3
AaB	2019–20	Danish Superliga	2	0	—		—		—		2	0
AaB	Total		30	2	1	2	—		—		31	4
Vendsyssel FF (loan)	2019–20	Danish 1st Division	22	11	1	2	—		—		23	13
Silkeborg IF	2020–21	Danish 1st Division	10	3	—		—		—		10	3
Silkeborg IF	2021–22	Danish Superliga	3	0	—		—		—		3	0
Silkeborg IF	Total		13	3	—		—		—		13	3
Vendsyssel FF	2021–22	Danish 1st Division	2	0	—		—		—		2	0
Vendsyssel FF	2022–23	Danish 1st Division	31	14	3	2	—		—		34	16
Vendsyssel FF	Total		33	14	3	2	—		—		36	16
IK Sirius	2023	Allsvenskan	16	10	1	1	—		—		17	11
Al Ahly	2023–24	Egyptian Premier League	19	18	0	0	6 (Note: Appearances in CAF Champions League)	1	—		25	19
Al Ahly	2024–25	Egyptian Premier League	16	10	0	0	10	4	8 (Note: Two appearances and one goal in FIFA Intercontinental Cup, two appearances in Egyptian Super Cup, one appearance and one goal in CAF Super Cup, three appearances and three goals in FIFA Club World Cup)	5	34	19
Al Ahly	Total		35	28	0	0	16	5	8	5	59	38
Columbus Crew	2025	Major League Soccer	5	3	—		—		0	0	5	3
Columbus Crew	2026	Major League Soccer	7	5	0	0	—		0	0	7	5
Columbus Crew	Total		12	8	0	0	—		0	0	12	8
Total			159	74	6	7	16	5	7	2	188	89

=== International ===
As of match played 8 September 2025

Appearances and goals by national team and year
National team	Year	Apps	Goals
Palestine	2024	6	2
Palestine	2025	5	2
Total		11	4

Scores and results list Palestine's goal tally first, score column indicates score after each Abou Ali goal.

List of international goals scored by Wessam Abou Ali
No.	Date	Venue	Opponent	Score	Result	Competition
1.	10 September 2024	Kuala Lumpur Stadium, Kuala Lumpur, Malaysia	Jordan	1–1	1–3	2026 FIFA World Cup qualification
2.	15 October 2024	Jassim bin Hamad Stadium, Al Rayyan, Qatar	Kuwait	1–1	2–2	2026 FIFA World Cup qualification
3.	25 March 2025	Amman International Stadium, Amman, Jordan	Iraq	1–1	2–1	2026 FIFA World Cup qualification
4.	5 June 2025	Jaber Al-Ahmad International Stadium, Kuwait City, Kuwait	Kuwait	2–0	2–0	2026 FIFA World Cup qualification

== Honours ==
Al Ahly

- Egyptian Premier League: 2023–24, 2024–25
- Egyptian Super Cup: 2024
- CAF Champions League: 2023–24
- FIFA African–Asian–Pacific Cup: 2024

Individual

- Egyptian Premier League top goalscorer: 2023–24
