= Hussein El Shahat =

Egyptian footballer (born 1992)

Hussein El Shahat حُسَيْن الشَّحَّات
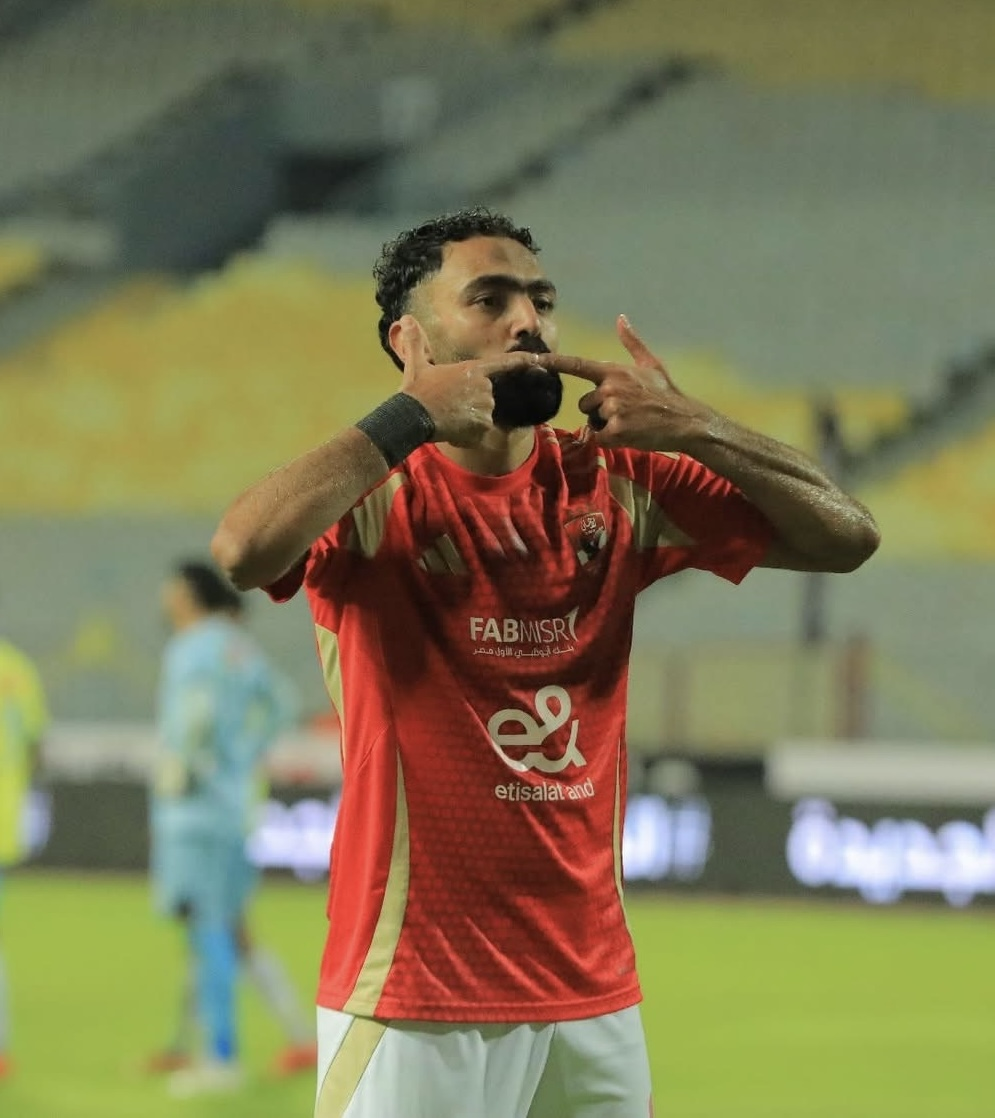
- El Shahat with Al Ahly in 2025

Personal information
- Full name: Hussein Ali El Shahat Ali Hassan
- Date of birth: 21 June 1992 (age 34)
- Place of birth: Egypt
- Height: 1.79 m (5 ft 10 in)
- Position: Winger

Team information
- Current team: Al Ahly
- Number: 14

Senior career*
Years	Team	Apps	(Gls)
2011–2014	Eastern Company		(8)
2014–2018	Makkasa	81	(13)
2018-2018	→ Al Ain (loan)	11	(7)
2018-2019	Al Ain	12	(6)
2019–	Al Ahly	138	(32)

International career^{‡}
2018–	Egypt	11	(0)
- * Club domestic league appearances and goals as of 15 January 2025 ‡ National team caps and goals as of 23 March 2025

Hussein Ali El Shahat Ali Hassan (Egyptian Arabic: حُسَيْن عَلِيّ الشَّحَّات عَلِيّ حَسَن, born 21 June 1992) is an Egyptian professional footballer who plays for Egyptian Premier League club Al Ahly as a winger.

== Club career ==
El Shahat played for Misr Lel-Makkasa from 2014 to 2018, before he joined Al Ain, where he won the 2017–18 UAE Pro League and was runner up at the 2018 FIFA Club World Cup. He scored one goal at the quarterfinals of the latter in a 3–0 win over Espérance Sportive de Tunis.

In January 2019, El Shahat joined Al Ahly. On 4 February 2021, he scored the winning goal for Al Ahly in a 1–0 win over Al-Duhail in the 2020 FIFA Club World Cup.

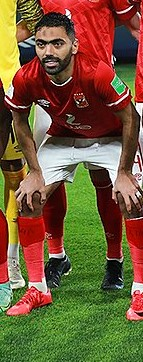
El Shahat with Al Ahly in 2021

On 11 February 2023, El Shahat made his 12th appearance in the FIFA Club World Cup, surpassing his compatriots Mohamed Aboutrika, Wael Gomaa, and Hossam Ashour. Later that year, on 15 December, he scored a goal in a 3–1 victory over Al-Ittihad in the 2023 FIFA Club World Cup, to be his fourth goal in that competition in four different editions.

== International career ==
He was called up to the Egyptian national team in August 2018, to face Niger in the AFCON qualifying round.

== Career statistics ==
=== Clubs ===
As of match played 15 January 2025

Club	Season	League			National cup (Note: Includes Egyptian Cup, UAE President's Cup)		League cup (Note: Includes UAE League Cup)		Continental		Other		Total	
Club	Season	Division	Apps	Goals	Apps	Goals	Apps	Goals	Apps	Goals	Apps	Goals	Apps	Goals
Eastern Company	2012–13	Egyptian Second Division		5			—		—		—			5
Eastern Company	2013–14	Egyptian Second Division		3			—		—		—			3
Eastern Company	Total			8			—		—		—			8
Makkasa	2014–15	Egyptian Premier League	18	0	1	0	—		—		—		19	0
Makkasa	2015–16	Egyptian Premier League	19	1	0	0	—		—		—		19	1
Makkasa	2016–17	Egyptian Premier League	28	3	2	1	—		—		—		30	4
Makkasa	2017–18	Egyptian Premier League	16	9	1	2	—		—		—		17	11
Makkasa	Total		81	13	4	3	—		—		—		85	16
Al Ain (loan)	2017–18	UAE Pro League	11	7	4	3	0	0	6 (Note: Appearances in AFC Champions League)	1	—		21	11
Al Ain (loan)	2018–19	UAE Pro League	12	6	1	1	1	0	—		5 (Note: One appearance in UAE Super Cup, four appearances and one goal in FIFA Club World Cup)	1	18	8
Al Ain (loan)	Total		23	13	5	4	1	0	6	1	5	1	40	19
Al Ahly	2018–19	Egyptian Premier League	17	4	1	0	—		7 (Note: Appearances in CAF Champions League)	1	1 (Note: Appearance(s) in Egyptian Super Cup)	1	26	6
Al Ahly	2019–20	Egyptian Premier League	19	5	5	0	—		11	3	1	0	36	8
Al Ahly	2020–21	Egyptian Premier League	30	9	1	0	—		9	1	4 (Note: One appearance in Egyptian Super Cup, one appearance in CAF Super Cup, two appearances and one goal in FIFA Club World Cup)	1	44	11
Al Ahly	2021–22	Egyptian Premier League	19	4	3	0	—		10	3	4 (Note: One appearance in CAF Super Cup, three appearances in FIFA Club World Cup)	0	36	7
Al Ahly	2022–23	Egyptian Premier League	21	4	4	1	—		11	4	4 (Note: One appearance in Egyptian Super Cup, three appearances and one goal in FIFA Club World Cup)	1	40	10
Al Ahly	2023–24	Egyptian Premier League	25	4	1	0	—		15 (Note: Twelve appearances and five goals in CAF Champions League, three appearances in African Football League)	5	6 (Note: Two appearances and one goal in Egyptian Super Cup, one appearance in CAF Super Cup, three appearances and one goal in FIFA Club World Cup)	2	48	11
Al Ahly	2024–25	Egyptian Premier League	7	2	0	0	—		7	2	5 (Note: Two appearances Egyptian Super Cup, one appearance in CAF Super Cup, two appearances in FIFA Club World Cup)	0	19	4
Al Ahly	Total		138	32	15	1	—		70	19	25	5	248	57
Career total			242	66	24	8	1	0	76	21	30	6	373	100

=== International ===
As of 1 September 2021

Appearances and goals by national team and year
National team	Year	Apps	Goals
Egypt	2018	3	0
Egypt	2019	3	0
Egypt	2020	0	0
Egypt	2021	1	0
Total		7	0

== Controversy ==
On 30 May 2024, El Shahat was sentenced to one year in prison, suspended for three years, and a 5-year sports ban subject to appeal, in addition to a fine of E£100,000, after physically and verbally assaulting Pyramids player Mohamed Chibi on the final matchday of the 2022–23 season.

On 9 November 2024 A reconciliation was reached between the duo, Chibi and El Shahat, while they were present at a ceremony to distribute the best awards in the Egyptian Premier League.

== Honours ==
Al Ain

- UAE Pro League: 2017–18
- FIFA Club World Cup runners-up: 2018

Al Ahly

- Egyptian Premier League: 2018–19, 2019–20, 2022–23, 2023–24, 2024–25
- Egypt Cup: 2019–20, 2021–22, 2022–23
- Egyptian Super Cup: 2019, 2022–23, 2023–24, 2024
- CAF Champions League: 2019–20, 2020-21, 2022–23, 2023–24
- CAF Super Cup: 2021 (May), 2021 (December)
- FIFA African–Asian–Pacific Cup: 2024
