= Reda Slim =

Moroccan footballer (born 1999)

Reda Slim رضا سليم
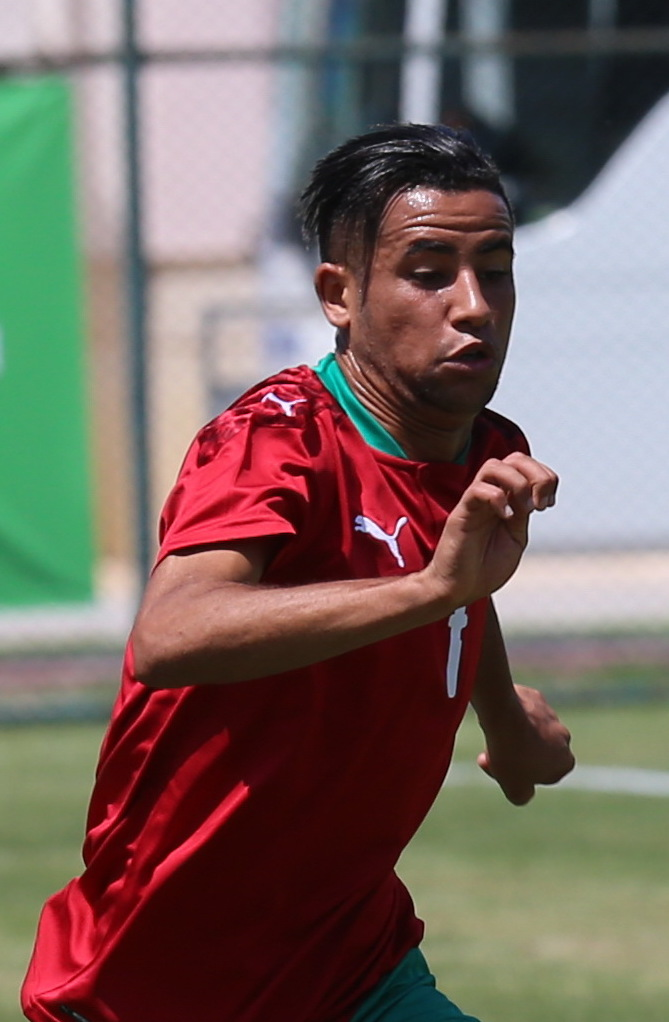

Personal information
- Full name: Reda Slim
- Date of birth: 25 October 1999 (age 27)
- Place of birth: Casablanca, Morocco
- Height: 1.76 m (5 ft 9 in)
- Position: Forward

Team information
- Current team: Al Ahly
- Number: 29

Youth career
- 2011–2014: AS FAR
- 2014–2017: Raja CA
- 2017–2019: AS FAR

Senior career*
Years	Team	Apps	(Gls)
2019–2023	AS FAR	95	(27)
2023–	Al Ahly	26	(4)
2025–2026	→AS FAR (loan)	27	(4)

International career
2021–	Morocco A'	2	(0)
Medal record
Men's football
Representing Morocco
African Nations Championship
Winner	2020 Cameroon
- * Club domestic league appearances and goals as of 20 March 2026

Reda Slim (Arabic: رضا سليم; born 25 October 1999) is a Moroccan professional footballer who plays as a forward for the Egyptian Premier League club Al Ahly.

== Career ==
As youth product of the FAR Rabat he made his debut in the Moroccan league 2019–2020, soon earning a first Man of the match award in the capital's derby against FUS Rabat, won 4–2 by the royal army club.

But as Slim was becoming a regular player of the first team, a shoulder injury kept him out of the field for 2 months, slowing his rapid progression.

On 20 October 2023, Slim scored the first goal in the history of the African Football League.

== Career statistics ==
=== Club ===
As of match played 8 August 2024

Appearances and goals by club, season and competition
Club	Season	League			National cup (Note: Includes Moroccan Throne Cup)		Continental		Other		Total	
Club	Season	Division	Apps	Goals	Apps	Goals	Apps	Goals	Apps	Goals	Apps	Goals
AS FAR	2018-19	Botola	0	0	2	2	—		—		2	2
AS FAR	2019-20	Botola	17	3	—		—		—		17	3
AS FAR	2020-21	Botola	25	6	4	1	—		—		29	7
AS FAR	2021-22	Botola	25	7	1	0	2 (Note: Appearance(s) in CAF Confederation Cup)	0	—		28	7
AS FAR	2022-23	Botola	28	11	—		10	2	—		38	13
AS FAR	Total		75	27	7	3	12	2	0	0	114	32
Al Ahly	2023-24	Egyptian Premier League	23	4	1	0	7 (Note: Appearance(s) in CAF Champions League)	0	4 (Note: One appearance in CAF Super Cup & Three appearances and one goal in African Football League)	1	35	5
Career Total			98	31	8	3	19	2	4	1	148	37

=== International ===
Appearances and goals by national team and year
National team	Year	Apps	Goals
Morocco	2021	1	0

== Honours ==
AS FAR

- Botola Pro: 2022–23
- Moroccan Throne Cup: 2019–20

Al Ahly

- Egyptian Premier League: 2023–24, 2024–25
- Egypt Cup: 2022–23
- Egyptian Super Cup: 2024
- CAF Champions League: 2023–24

Morocco

- African Nations Championship: 2020

Individual

- Botola Pro Player of the Year: 2022–23
- Botola Pro Young Player of the Year: 2019–20
- Botola Pro Team of the Season: 2022–23
- Botola Pro Top assists provider: 2022–23
