= Yousef Aymen =

Qatari footballer (born 1999)

Personal information
- Date of birth: 21 March 1999 (age 27)
- Place of birth: Egypt
- Height: 1.88 m (6 ft 2 in)
- Position: Defender

Team information
- Current team: Al-Rayyan (on loan from Al-Duhail)
- Number: 4

Youth career
- –2009: Al-Ahly
- 2009–2017: Aspire Academy
- 2017–2018: Al-Duhail
- 2018: → Eupen (loan)

Senior career*
Years	Team	Apps	(Gls)
2017–	Al-Duhail	58	(4)
2019–2020	→ Qatar (loan)	8	(1)
2020	→ Al-Sailiya (loan)	0	(0)
2020–2021	→ Qatar (loan)	12	(0)
2021–2022	→ Qatar (loan)	12	(0)
2024–2025	→ Al-Ahly (loan)	1	(0)
2026–	→ Al-Rayyan (loan)	0	(0)

International career
2022	Qatar U23	3	(0)
2023–	Qatar	11	(1)
- * Club domestic league appearances and goals

Yousef Aymen Hafez Farahat (born 21 March 1999) is a professional footballer who plays as defender for Al-Rayyan, on loan from Qatar Stars League club Al-Duhail. Born in Egypt, he plays for the Qatar national team.

== Club career ==
Aymen began his professional career with Al-Duhail in 2016. In July 2024, he was loaned to Egyptian club Al Ahly SC. In January 2025 he returned to Al-Duhail.

== International career ==
Aymen was named to the Qatar national team for the 2023 CONCACAF Gold Cup.

On 11 June 2024, he scored for Qatar in a 2–1 win over India in 2026 FIFA World Cup qualification.
