= 2024 Egyptian Super Cup =

Egyptian football competition

Egyptian Super Cup

Tournament details
- Host country: UAE
- City: Abu Dhabi
- Dates: 20–24 October 2024
- Teams: 4

Final positions
- Champions: Al Ahly (15th title)
- Runners-up: Zamalek
- Third place: Pyramids
- Fourth place: Ceramica Cleopatra

Tournament statistics
- Matches played: 4
- Goals scored: 9 (2.25 per match)
- Top scorer(s): Taher Mohamed (2 goals)

The 2024 Egyptian Super Cup, officially the NBE Egyptian Super Cup for sponsorship purposes, was the 22nd edition of the Egyptian Super Cup, an annual football competition contested by teams that were successful in the preceding season of Egyptian football.

Al Ahly were the defending champions. They successfully defended their title after beating Zamalek in the final 7–6 on penalties, after the match ended goalless after extra time, winning a record-extending 15th Egyptian Super Cup title.

== Format ==
The tournament consists of four teams: the winners of all three major football competitions in Egypt from the preceding season (Egyptian Premier League, Egypt Cup and Egyptian League Cup), while the fourth team is invited by receiving a 'golden card' from the Egyptian Football Association.

Fixtures were announced on 2 October 2024.

=== Qualified teams ===
The following four teams qualified for the tournament.

Team	Method of qualification
Al Ahly	2023–24 Egyptian Premier League winners
Pyramids	2023–24 Egypt Cup winners
Ceramica Cleopatra	2023–24 Egyptian League Cup winners
Zamalek	Golden card recipient

== Bracket ==
Semi-finals
20 October 2024
Al Ahly	2
Ceramica Cleopatra	1
20 October 2024
Pyramids	1 (4)
Zamalek (p)	1 (5)

Final
24 October 2024
Al Ahly (p)	0 (7)
Zamalek	0 (6)
Third place match
24 October 2024
Ceramica Cleopatra	2 (4)
Pyramids (p)	2 (5)

== Matches ==
All times are GST (UTC+4).

=== Semi-finals ===
20 October 2024	Pyramids	1–1 (4–5 p)	Zamalek	Abu Dhabi
17:05	Adel 14'	Report	Jaziri 40'	Stadium: Al Nahyan Stadium; Referee: Mohamed Maarouf
	Penalties
	Hafez (penalty scored); Magdy (penalty scored); Obama (penalty scored); Mayele (penalty scored); Fathi (penalty missed)		(penalty scored) El Said; (penalty scored) Mathlouthi; (penalty scored) Abdelmaguid; (penalty scored) Mansi; (penalty scored) Sayed

20 October 2024	Al Ahly	2–1	Ceramica Cleopatra	Abu Dhabi
21:00	Taher 1', 54'	Report	Lakay 45+3'	Stadium: Mohammed bin Zayed Stadium; Referee: Ahmed El Ghandour

=== Third place match ===
24 October 2024	Ceramica Cleopatra	2–2 (4–5 p)	Pyramids	Abu Dhabi
17:05	Issa 20'; Belhadji 77' (pen.)	Report	Abda. Magdy 34' (o.g.); Mar. Hamdy 85'	Stadium: Al Nahyan Stadium; Referee: Mahmoud Nagy
	Penalties
	Ebuka (penalty scored); Belhadji (penalty scored); Kendouci (penalty scored); Nabil (penalty scored); Moka (penalty missed)		(penalty scored) Mar. Hamdy; (penalty scored) Obama; (penalty scored) Ramadan; (penalty scored) Adel; (penalty scored) Hafez

=== Final ===
24 October 2024
21:00 GST

Al Ahly	0–0 (a.e.t.)	Zamalek
	Report
Penalties
Magdy (penalty scored); Kamal (penalty scored); Attia (penalty scored); El Solia (penalty scored); Slim (penalty missed); Tau (penalty scored); Aymen (penalty missed); Attiyat Allah (penalty scored); El Shahat (penalty scored)	7–6	(penalty scored) El Said; (penalty missed) Mathlouthi; (penalty scored) Abdelmaguid; (penalty scored) Mansi; (penalty scored) Sayed; (penalty scored) Mo. Hamdy; (penalty missed) Shikabala; (penalty scored) Michalak; (penalty missed) Gaber

Mohammed bin Zayed Stadium, Abu Dhabi
Referee: Amin Omar
