= 2025–26 Zamalek SC season =

Zamalek SC
2025–26 season
- Manager: Yannick Ferrera (until 1 November); Ahmed Abdel Raouf (caretaker, 1 November–31 December); Moatamed Gamal (caretaker, from 7 January)
- Stadium: Cairo International Stadium
- Egyptian Premier League: First Stage: 1st
- Egyptian Premier League: Championship Group: 1st
- Egypt Cup: Round of 16
- Egyptian League Cup: Group stage
- Egyptian Super Cup: Runners-up
- CAF Confederation Cup: Runners-up
- Top goalscorer: League: Oday Dabbagh (9); All: Oday Dabbagh (13)
- Biggest win: Dekedaha FC 0–6 Zamalek
- Biggest defeat: Al Ittihad 3–0 Zamalek; Zamalek 0–3 Al Ahly
Home colours	Away colours

The 2025–26 season was the 115th season in the history of Zamalek Sporting Club. The club participated in the Egyptian Premier League, the Egypt Cup, the Egyptian League Cup, the Egyptian Super Cup, and the CAF Confederation Cup.

== Transfers ==
=== In ===
Pos.	Player	Transferred from	Fee	Date	Source
FW	(Egypt) Ahmed Sherif	(Egypt) Pharco		2 July 2025	
FW	(Egypt) Amr Nasser	(Egypt) Pharco		7 July 2025	
GK	(Egypt) El Mahdy Soliman	(Egypt) Al Ittihad Alexandria	Free	11 July 2025	
MF	(Angola) Chico Banza	(Portugal) Estrela da Amadora	$700,000	13 July 2025	
MF	(Morocco) Abdelhamid Maali	(Morocco) Ittihad Tanger	$500,000	17 July 2025	
MF	(Palestine) Adam Kaied	(Netherlands) NAC Breda	Free	20 July 2025	
DF	(Egypt) Mohamed Ismail	(Egypt) ZED FC		21 July 2025	
MF	(Egypt) Ahmed Rabie	(Egypt) National Bank	EGP 35,000,000	29 July 2025	
FW	(Palestine) Omar Faraj	(Sweden) Degerfors IF	Loan return	31 July 2025	
FW	(Palestine) Oday Dabbagh	(Belgium) Charleroi	€350,000	5 August 2025	
MF	(Brazil) Juan Bezerra	(Ukraine) Oleksandriya	€1,800,000	6 August 2025	
DF	(Kenya) Baron Ochieng	(Kenya) Sofapaka	Free	11 September 2025	
FW	(Tunisia) Ahmed Jafeli	(Saudi Arabia) Abha	Loan return (early)	3 January 2026	

=== Out ===
Pos.	Player	Transferred to	Fee	Date	Source
FW	(Egypt) Zizo	(Egypt) Al Ahly	End of contract	6 June 2025	
DF	(Egypt) Mohamed Abdel Shafy	Retired		1 July 2025	
MF	(Egypt) Shikabala	Retired		1 July 2025	
DF	(Tunisia) Hamza Mathlouthi	(Tunisia) CS Sfaxien	End of contract	1 July 2025	
FW	(Egypt) Mostafa Shalaby	(Egypt) National Bank	EGP 35,000,000	20 July 2025	
FW	(Tunisia) Ahmed Jafeli	(Saudi Arabia) Abha	Loan	6 August 2025	
DF	(Morocco) Sallah Moussaddaq	(Morocco) Wydad AC	Contract terminated	25 November 2025	
MF	(Morocco) Abdelhamid Maali	(Morocco) Ittihad Tanger	Contract terminated	6 December 2025	
FW	(Palestine) Omar Faraj	(Sweden) Halmstads BK	Contract terminated	7 December 2025	
MF	(Egypt) Nasser Maher	(Egypt) Pyramids	EGP 60,000,000	20 January 2026	

== Pre-season and friendlies ==
11 July 2025	Zamalek	1–0	Orange	Cairo
	Abdelmaguid			Stadium: Military Academy Stadium

18 July 2025	Zamalek	1–0	Ra'a	New Administrative Capital

19 July 2025	Zamalek	5–4	Al-Shams	New Administrative Capital

25 July 2025	Zamalek	0–1	Wadi Degla	New Administrative Capital

31 July 2025	Zamalek	2–1	Ghazl El Mahalla

1 August 2025	Zamalek	1–3	Proxy

7 September 2025	Zamalek	1–1	Nogoom FC

19 March 2026	Zamalek	1–0	Guinness

30 March 2026	Zamalek	5–0	El Sharqia Lel Dokhan	Alexandria

== Competitions ==
=== Overall record ===
Competition	First match	Last match	Starting round	Final position	Record							
Competition	First match	Last match	Starting round	Final position	Pld	W	D	L	GF	GA	GD	Win %
Premier League First Stage	8 August 2025	11 March 2026	Matchday 1	1st	20	13	4	3	32	13	+19	65.00
Premier League Championship Group	5 April 2026	20 May 2026	Matchday 1	Winners	6	4	1	1	7	4	+3	66.67
Egypt Cup	28 December 2025	17 February 2026	Round of 32	Round of 32	2	1	0	1	2	2	+0	50.00
Egyptian League Cup	9 December 2025	15 January 2026	Group stage	Group stage	6	2	1	3	7	9	−2	33.33
Egyptian Super Cup	6 November 2025	9 November 2025	Semi-finals	Runners-up	2	0	1	1	0	2	−2	0.00
CAF Confederation Cup	18 October 2025	16 May 2026	Second preliminary round	Runners-up	14	8	4	2	17	5	+12	57.14
Total					50	28	11	11	65	35	+30	56.00

Source: Competitions

=== Egyptian Premier League ===
==== First Stage ====
The draw of the first stage was conducted on 27 July 2025.

Pos	Team	Pld	W	D	L	GF	GA	GD	Pts	Qualification
1	Zamalek	20	13	4	3	32	13	+19	43	Qualification for the championship play-offs
2	Pyramids	20	13	4	3	33	15	+18	43	Qualification for the championship play-offs
3	Al Ahly	20	11	7	2	33	19	+14	40	Qualification for the championship play-offs
4	Ceramica Cleopatra	20	11	5	4	29	16	+13	38	Qualification for the championship play-offs
5	Al Masry	20	8	8	4	29	20	+9	32	Qualification for the championship play-offs

Source: Soccerway (regular season)
Rules for classification: 1) Points; 2) Goal difference; 3) Goals scored.

===== Results summary =====
Overall								Home						Away					
Pld	W	D	L	GF	GA	GD	Pts	W	D	L	GF	GA	GD	W	D	L	GF	GA	GD
20	13	4	3	32	13	+19	43	7	3	0	15	3	+12	6	1	3	17	10	+7

Round	1	2	3	4	5	6	7	8	9	10	11	12	13	14	15	16	17	18	19	20	21
Ground	A	H	A	H	A	H	A	H	A	H		A	H	H	A	H	A	H	A	A	H
Result	W	D	W	W	L	W	W	D	L	D	B	D	W	W	L	W	W	W	W	W	W
Position	2	3	2	1	2	1	1	1	2	3	5	5	4	4	4	4	3	3	2	1	1

A = Away; H = Home; B = Bye; W = Win; D = Draw; L = Loss

===== Matches =====
8 August 2025 1	Ceramica Cleopatra	0–2	Zamalek

16 August 2025 2	Zamalek	0–0	Al Mokawloon Al Arab

21 August 2025 3	Modern Sport	1–2	Zamalek

26 August 2025 4	Zamalek	1–0	Pharco

31 August 2025 5	Wadi Degla	2–1	Zamalek

13 September 2025 6	Zamalek	3–0	Al Masry

18 September 2025 7	Ismaily	0–2	Zamalek

23 September 2025 8	Zamalek	1–1	El Gouna

29 September 2025 9	Al Ahly	2–1	Zamalek

4 October 2025 10	Zamalek	1–1	Ghazl El Mahalla

11	Bye

30 October 2025 12	National Bank	1–1	Zamalek

2 November 2025 13	Zamalek	3–1	Tala'ea El Gaish

28 January 2026 16	Zamalek	2–0	Petrojet

4 February 2026 17	Kahrabaa Ismailia	2–5	Zamalek

11 February 2026 14	Zamalek	1–0	Smouha

20 February 2026 18	Zamalek	2–0	Haras El Hodoud

24 February 2026 19	ZED	1–2	Zamalek

1 March 2026 20	Pyramids	0–1	Zamalek

6 March 2026 21	Zamalek	1–0	Al Ittihad

11 March 2026 15	ENPPI	1–0	Zamalek

==== Championship Group ====
The draw of the championship group was held on 12 March 2026.

Pos	Team	Pld	W	D	L	GF	GA	GD	Pts	Qualification
1	Zamalek (C)	6	4	1	1	7	4	+3	56	Qualification for the Champions League first or second round
2	Pyramids	6	3	2	1	10	6	+4	54	Qualification for the Champions League first or second round
3	Al Ahly	6	4	1	1	11	5	+6	53	Qualification for the Confederation Cup first or second round
4	Ceramica Cleopatra	6	1	3	2	5	5	0	44	
5	Al Masry	6	2	2	2	6	9	−3	40	

Updated to match(es) played on 20 May 2026. Source: Soccerway (championship round)
Rules for classification: 1) Points; 2) Head to Head; 3) Goals scored; 4) Play-off tie.
(Note: Clubs qualified for this phase with the full regular season points they got, but without goals for or against)
(C) Champions

Overall								Home						Away					
Pld	W	D	L	GF	GA	GD	Pts	W	D	L	GF	GA	GD	W	D	L	GF	GA	GD
6	4	1	1	7	4	+3	13	2	1	1	2	3	−1	2	0	0	5	1	+4

Last updated: complete.

Round	1	2	3	4	5	6	7
Ground	A		H	H	H	A	H
Result	W	B	W	D	L	W	W
Position	1	1	1	1	1	1	1

A = Away; H = Home; B = Bye; W = Win; D = Draw; L = Loss

5 April 2026 1	Al Masry	1–4	Zamalek	Alexandria
20:00 UTC+3	Zemraoui 13'		Dabbagh 30'; Mansi 44', 75'; Abdelmaguid 86'	Stadium: Borg El Arab Stadium; Referee: Mohamed Maarouf

2	Bye

23 April 2026 3	Zamalek	1–0	Pyramids	Cairo
20:00 UTC+3	Bezerra 84'			Stadium: Cairo International Stadium; Referee: Mohamed El-Ghazi

27 April 2026 4	Zamalek	0–0	ENPPI	Cairo
17:00 UTC+3				Stadium: Cairo International Stadium; Referee: Mahmoud Nagy

1 May 2026 5	Zamalek	0–3	Al Ahly	Cairo
20:00 UTC+3	Abou El Fotouh (yellow card) 20'; Abdelmaguid (penalty missed) 55; Hamdi (yellow card) 57'; Bentayg (yellow card) 57'; Banza (yellow card) 90+3'		Bencharki 18', 74'; El Shahat 32', (yellow card) 32'; Trézéguet (penalty missed) 66; Marei (yellow card) 70'; Eid (yellow card) 90+3'	Stadium: Cairo International Stadium; Attendance: 40,000; Referee: Matthias Jöllenbeck (Germany)

5 May 2026 6	Smouha	0–1	Zamalek	Alexandria
20:00 UTC+3			Dabbagh 62'	Stadium: Borg El Arab Stadium; Referee: Mohamed El-Ghazi

20 May 2026 7	Zamalek	1–0	Ceramica Cleopatra	Cairo
20:00 UTC+3	Dabbagh 8'; Banza (yellow card) 14'; El Said (yellow card) 20'; Awad (yellow card) 53'; Ibrahim (yellow card) 86'; Shehata (yellow card) 87'		Belhadji (penalty missed) , 56; Awujoola (yellow card) 90+1'	Stadium: Cairo International Stadium; Referee: Sascha Stegemann (Germany)

=== Egypt Cup ===
28 December 2025 Round of 32	Zamalek	1–0	Baladiyat El Mahalla	Cairo
14:30	Mansi 45+1'			Stadium: Osman Ahmed Osman Stadium; Referee: Mohamed El-Ghazi

17 February 2026 Round of 16	Zamalek	1–2	Ceramica Cleopatra	Ismailia
				Stadium: Suez Canal Authority Stadium

=== League Cup ===
Group C

Pos	Team	Pld	W	D	L	GF	GA	GD	Pts
3	Al Ittihad	6	1	5	0	5	2	+3	8
4	Kahrabaa Ismailia	6	1	5	0	12	11	+1	8
5	Smouha	6	2	2	2	4	5	−1	8
6	Zamalek	6	2	1	3	7	9	−2	7
7	Haras El Hodoud	6	0	2	4	4	9	−5	2

Source: EFL
Rules for classification: Group stage tiebreakers

9 December 2025 1	Kahrabaa Ismailia	3–3	Zamalek	Cairo
				Stadium: Osman Ahmed Osman Stadium

20 December 2025 2	Zamalek	2–1	Haras El Hodoud	Cairo
				Stadium: Osman Ahmed Osman Stadium

24 December 2025 3	Zamalek	0–1	Smouha	Cairo
				Stadium: Osman Ahmed Osman Stadium

1 January 2026 4	Al Ittihad	3–0	Zamalek	Alexandria
				Stadium: Borg El Arab Stadium

5	Bye

11 January 2026 6	Zamalek	0–1	ZED	Cairo
				Stadium: Al Salam Stadium

15 January 2026 7	Zamalek	2–0	Al Masry	Alexandria
				Stadium: Borg El Arab Stadium

=== Egyptian Super Cup ===
6 November 2025 Semi-finals	Zamalek	0–0 (5–4 p)	Pyramids	Abu Dhabi, United Arab Emirates
				Stadium: Al Nahyan Stadium

9 November 2025 Final	Al Ahly	2–0	Zamalek	Abu Dhabi, United Arab Emirates
				Stadium: Mohammed bin Zayed Stadium

=== CAF Confederation Cup ===
==== Second preliminary round ====
18 October 2025 First leg	Dekedaha FC (Somalia)	0–6	(Egypt) Zamalek
			Sherif 22'; Bezerra 35', 77'; Nasser 37'; Jaziri 65'; Gaafar 83'

24 October 2025 Second leg	Zamalek (Egypt)	1–0 (7–0 agg.)	(Somalia) Dekedaha FC
	Jaziri 36' (pen.)

==== Group stage ====
The draw of the group stage took place on 3 November 2025.

Pos	Team	Pld	W	D	L	GF	GA	GD	Pts	Qualification
1	(Egypt) Zamalek	6	3	2	1	6	4	+2	11	Advance to knockout stage
2	(Egypt) Al Masry	6	3	1	2	9	7	+2	10 (Note: Ranked on goal difference in all group matches: Al Masry +2, Kaizer Chiefs +1.)	Advance to knockout stage
3	(South Africa) Kaizer Chiefs	6	3	1	2	7	6	+1	10	
4	(Zambia) ZESCO United	6	1	0	5	3	8	−5	3	

Source: CAF
Notes:

Round	1	2	3	4	5	6
Ground	H	A	H	A	A	H
Result	W	D	D	W	L	W
Position	2	2	2	1	2	1

A = Away; H = Home; W = Win; D = Draw; L = Loss

23 November 2025 1	Zamalek (Egypt)	1–0	(Zambia) ZESCO United	Cairo
	Jaziri 42'			Stadium: Cairo International Stadium

29 November 2025 2	Kaizer Chiefs (South Africa)	1–1	(Egypt) Zamalek	Polokwane, South Africa
	Sobhi 90+6' (o.g.)		Jaziri 3'	Stadium: Peter Mokaba Stadium

25 January 2026 3	Zamalek (Egypt)	0–0	(Egypt) Al Masry	Alexandria
				Stadium: Borg El Arab Stadium

1 February 2026 4	Al Masry (Egypt)	1–2	(Egypt) Zamalek	Alexandria
	Mohsen 34' (pen.)		Abdelmaguid 24' (pen.); Dabbagh 75'	Stadium: Borg El Arab Stadium

8 February 2026 5	ZESCO United (Zambia)	1–0	(Egypt) Zamalek	Ndola, Zambia
	Hiver 61' (pen.)			Stadium: Levy Mwanawasa Stadium; Referee: Abdou Abdel Mefire (Cameroon)

14 February 2026 6	Zamalek (Egypt)	2–1	(South Africa) Kaizer Chiefs	Cairo
	Bezerra 53'; El Said 72'		Lilepo 75'	Stadium: Cairo International Stadium; Referee: Mahmood Ismail (Sudan)

==== Quarter-finals ====
14 March 2026 First leg	AS Otohô (Republic of the Congo)	1–1	(Egypt) Zamalek	Brazzaville, Republic of the Congo
13:00 UTC+1	Atipo 13'; Itoua (yellow card) 44'		Dabbagh 32'	Stadium: Alphonse Massemba-Débat Stadium; Referee: Clément Franklin Kpan (Ivory Coast)

22 March 2026 Second leg	Zamalek (Egypt)	2–1 (3–2 agg.)	(Republic of the Congo) AS Otohô	Cairo
18:00 UTC+2	Abdelmaguid 17'; Dabbagh 24'; Abou El Fotouh (yellow card) 36'; Sobhi (red card) 88'		Obembi (yellow card) 44'; Nsemi (yellow card) 45+5'; Mavoungou 83'; Diallo (yellow card) 88'	Stadium: Cairo International Stadium; Referee: Peter Waweru (Kenya)

==== Semi-finals ====
10 April 2026 First leg	CR Belouizdad (Algeria)	0–1	(Egypt) Zamalek	Algiers, Algeria
20:00 UTC+1	Khacef (yellow card) 30'; Boussouar (yellow card) 44'; Benguit (yellow card) 52'		Rabie (yellow card) 16'; Bezerra 28'; Soliman (yellow card) 79'; Gaber (yellow card) 90'	Stadium: Nelson Mandela Stadium

17 April 2026 Second leg	Zamalek (Egypt)	0–0 (1–0 agg.)	(Algeria) CR Belouizdad	Cairo
19:00 UTC+3	Dabbagh (yellow card) 28'; Abdelmaguid (yellow card) 73'		Benguit (yellow card) 31'; Khacef (yellow card) 43'; Boukhanchouche (yellow card) 89'	Stadium: Cairo International Stadium

==== Finals ====
9 May 2026 First leg	USM Alger (Algeria)	1–0	(Egypt) Zamalek	Algiers, Algeria
20:00 UTC+1	Loucif (yellow card) 17'; Radouani (yellow card) 45'; Malone (yellow card) 81'; Benbot (yellow card) 90+6'; Khaldi 90+8' (pen.)	Report	Banza (yellow card) 88'; Abdelmaguid (yellow card) 90+6'; Bentayg (yellow card) 90+6', (red card) 90+6'	Stadium: 5 July 1962 Stadium; Referee: Dahane Beida (Mauritania)

16 May 2026 Second leg	Zamalek (Egypt)	1–0 (1–1 agg.) (7–8 p)	(Algeria) USM Alger	Cairo
21:00 UTC+3	Dabbagh 5' (pen.); El Said (yellow card) 65'		Dehiri (yellow card) 45+5'	Stadium: Cairo International Stadium; Attendance: 46,200; Referee: Pierre Atcho (Gabon)
	Penalties
	El Said (penalty scored); Esho (penalty scored); Abdelmaguid (penalty scored); Mansi (penalty scored); Jaziri (penalty scored); Bezerra (penalty scored); El Sayed (penalty scored); Shehata (penalty missed)		(penalty scored) Draoui; (penalty scored) Khaldi; (penalty scored) Radouani; (penalty scored) Benayad; (penalty scored) Loucif; (penalty scored) Chetti; (penalty scored) Dehiri; (penalty scored) Likonza

== Statistics ==
=== Goalscorers ===
Rank	Pos	Player	Prem	Cup	EFL	Super	CAF	Total
1	FW	(Palestine) Oday Dabbagh	9	0	0	0	4	13
2	MF	(Brazil) Juan Bezerra	3	0	0	0	5	8
2	FW	(Egypt) Nasser Mansi	6	1	1	0	0	8
4	DF	(Egypt) Hossam Abdelmaguid	4	0	0	0	2	6
5	FW	(Tunisia) Seifeddine Jaziri	0	0	0	0	4	4
6	FW	(Angola) Chico Banza	3	0	0	0	0	3
6	MF	(Egypt) Abdallah El Said	2	0	0	0	1	3
6	FW	(Egypt) Amr Nasser	0	0	2	0	1	3
6	FW	(Egypt) Ahmed Sherif	1	0	1	0	1	3
9	MF	(Egypt) Ahmed Rabie	2	0	0	0	0	2
11	DF	(Egypt) Ahmed Abou El Fotouh	1	0	0	0	0	1
11	MF	(Egypt) Seif Gaafar	0	0	0	0	1	1
11	DF	(Egypt) Omar Gaber	1	0	0	0	0	1
11	DF	(Egypt) Mohamed Ismail	0	1	0	0	0	1
11	MF	(Palestine) Adam Kaied	0	0	1	0	0	1
11	MF	(Egypt) Mohamed Shehata	1	0	0	0	0	1
		Own goal	1	0	1	0	0	2
