= 2026 CAF Confederation Cup final =

African club football tournament final

- Promotional banner
- Event: 2025–26 CAF Confederation Cup
USM Alger	Zamalek
(Algeria)	(Egypt)
1	1
- USM Alger won 8–7 on penalties

First leg
USM Alger	Zamalek
1	0
- Date: 9 May 2026
- Venue: Stade du 5 Juillet, Algiers
- Referee: Dahane Beida
- Attendance: 50,000
- Weather: Cloudy; 19 °C (66 °F); 79% humidity

Second leg
Zamalek	USM Alger
1	0
- Date: 16 May 2026
- Venue: Cairo International Stadium, Cairo
- Referee: Pierre Atcho
- Attendance: 46,200
- Weather: Clear weather 29 °C (84 °F); 29% humidity

The 2026 CAF Confederation Cup final was the two-legged final of the 2025–26 CAF Confederation Cup, the 23rd season of the CAF Confederation Cup and the 51st as Africa's secondary club football competition organized by the Confederation of African Football (CAF), contested by USM Alger from Algeria and Zamalek from Egypt.

The final finished 1–1 on aggregate, with USM Alger winning 8–7 on penalties for their second CAF Confederation Cup title. The winners earned the right to play in the 2026 CAF Super Cup.

== Teams ==
Team	Zone	Previous finals appearances (bold indicates winners)
(Algeria) USM Alger	UNAF (North Africa)	1 (**2023**)
(Egypt) Zamalek	UNAF (North Africa)	2 (**2019**, **2024**)

== Venues ==
Stade du 5 Juillet in Algiers, Algeria, hosted first leg.

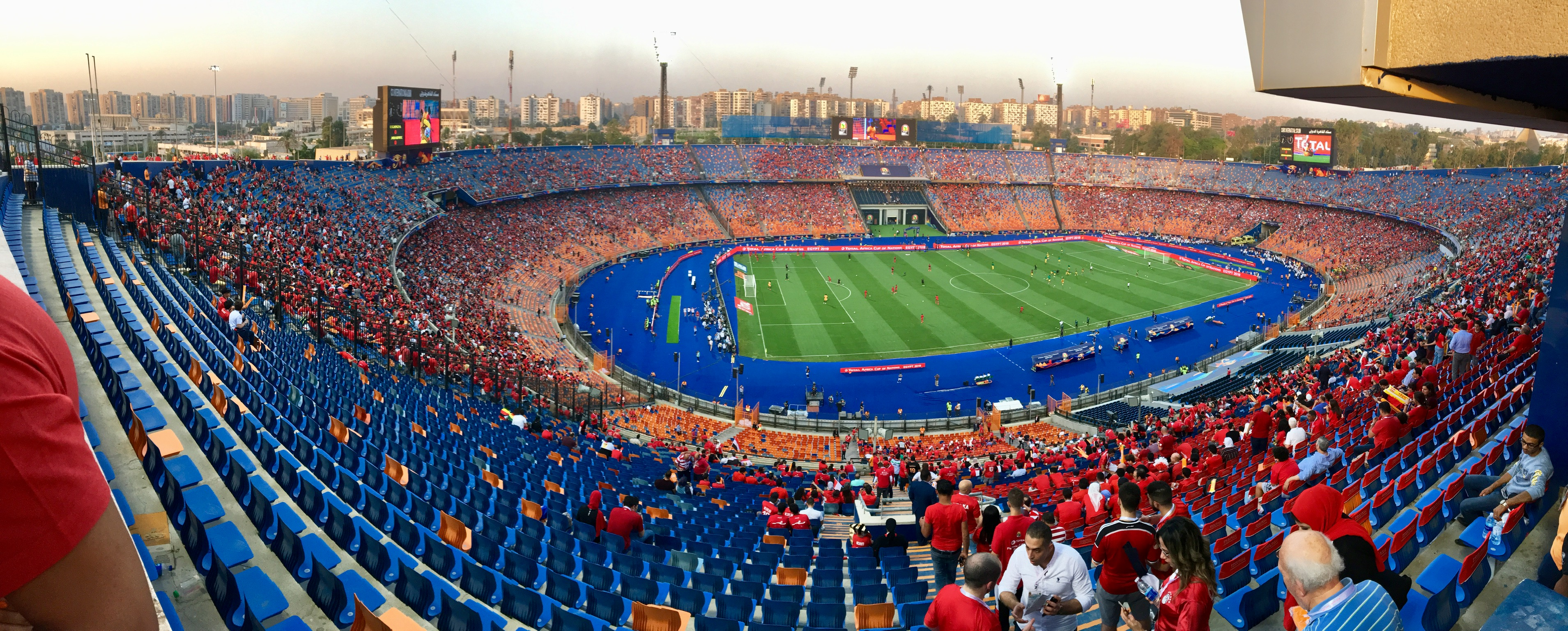
Cairo International Stadium in Cairo, Egypt, hosted the second leg.

== Road to the final ==
Note: In all results below, the score of the finalist is given first (H: home; A: away).

(Algeria) USM Alger				Round	(Egypt) Zamalek			
Opponent	Agg	1st leg	2nd leg	Qualifying rounds	Opponent	Agg	1st leg	2nd leg
Bye				First round	Bye			
(Ivory Coast) AFAD Djékanou	3–1	0–1 (A)	3–0 (H)	Second round	(Somalia) Dekedaha	7–0	6–0 (A)	1–0 (H)
Opponent	Result			Group stage	Opponent	Result		
(Ivory Coast) San Pédro	3–2 (H)			Matchday 1	(Zambia) ZESCO United	1–0 (H)		
(Morocco) Olympic Safi	1–0 (A)			Matchday 2	(South Africa) Kaizer Chiefs	1–1 (A)		
(Mali) Djoliba	2–0 (H)			Matchday 3	(Egypt) Al Masry	0–0 (H)		
(Mali) Djoliba	0–0 (A)			Matchday 4	(Egypt) Al Masry	2–1 (A)		
(Ivory Coast) San Pédro	3–2 (A)			Matchday 5	(Zambia) ZESCO United	0–1 (A)		
(Morocco) Olympic Safi	0–0 (H)			Matchday 6	(South Africa) Kaizer Chiefs	2–1 (H)		
**Group A winners**: Pos / Team / Pld / Pts; **1** / (Algeria) USM Alger / **6** / **14**; 2 / (Morocco) Olympic Safi / 6 / **13**; 3 / (Mali) Djoliba / 6 / **4**; 4 / (Ivory Coast) San Pédro / 6 / **3**; Source: CAF				Final standings	**Group D winners**: Pos / Team / Pld / Pts; **1** / (Egypt) Zamalek / **6** / **11**; 2 / (Egypt) Al Masry / 6 / **10**; 3 / (South Africa) Kaizer Chiefs / 6 / **10**; 4 / (Zambia) ZESCO United / 6 / **3**; Source: CAF			
Opponent	Agg	1st leg	2nd leg	Knockout stage	Opponent	Agg	1st leg	2nd leg
(Democratic Republic of the Congo) Maniema Union	2–2 (a)	1–2 (A)	1–0 (H)	Quarter-finals	(Republic of the Congo) AS Otohô	3–2	1–1 (A)	2–1 (H)
(Morocco) Olympic Safi	1–1 (a)	0–0 (H)	1–1 (A)	Semi-finals	(Algeria) CR Belouizdad	1–0	1–0 (A)	0–0 (H)

== Format ==
The final is played on a home-and-away two-legged basis.

If the aggregate score was tied after the second leg, the away goals rule would be applied, and if still tied, extra time would not be played, and a penalty shoot-out would be used to determine the winners.

== Matches ==
=== First leg ===
In the first leg of the CAF Confederation Cup final at the Stade du 5 Juillet, USM Alger secured a narrow but valuable 1–0 victory over Zamalek SC after a dramatic and hard-fought encounter. As expected, the Algerian side faced a highly experienced opponent accustomed to major continental matches. Despite the electric atmosphere created by the packed crowd at the Stade du 5 Juillet, Zamalek showed composure and tactical discipline throughout the game. Although USMA enjoyed more possession and attacking pressure, they repeatedly lacked precision and efficiency in the final third against a well organized Egyptian defense.

Zamalek also threatened on several counterattacks, particularly through Angolan forward Chico Banza. The visitors came closest to scoring in the 52nd minute when Banza lobbed goalkeeper Benbot, only for Hocine Dehiri to clear the ball almost off the goal line. Meanwhile, USMA continued to push forward through players such as Brahim Benzaza, Kamagaté, and Ahmed Khaldi, but failed to convert their chances for most of the match.

The decisive moment came deep into stoppage time. In the 90+2nd minute, Bezerra appeared to have scored for Zamalek following a rapid counterattack, but Mauritanian referee Dahane Beida consulted VAR and ruled out the goal for a prior foul by Mahmoud Bentayg on Rayane Mahrouz inside the penalty area. Bentayg was sent off, and a penalty was awarded to USMA. Khaldi calmly converted the spot kick to hand the Algerian side a dramatic late victory, sparking huge celebrations inside the stadium.

==== Details ====
9 May 2026
20:00 UTC+1

USM Alger (Algeria)	1–0	(Egypt) Zamalek
Khaldi 90+8' (pen.)	Report

Stade du 5 Juillet, Algiers
Attendance: 50,000
Referee: Dahane Beida (Mauritania)

**USM Alger**	**Zamalek**

GK	25	(Algeria) Oussama Benbot	(yellow card) 90+6'
CB	4	(Cameroon) Che Malone	(yellow card) 81'
CB	13	(Algeria) Hocine Dehiri
RB	19	(Algeria) Saâdi Radouani (c)	(yellow card) 45'
LB	12	(Algeria) Haithem Loucif	(yellow card) 17'
DM	6	(Algeria) Zakaria Draoui
DM	14	(Algeria) Brahim Benzaza		(substituted off) 86'
AM	8	(Algeria) Islam Merili
AM	30	(Senegal) Aimé Tendeng		(substituted off) 73'
ST	7	(Algeria) Ahmed Khaldi
ST	29	(Ivory Coast) Dramane Kamagaté		(substituted off) 73'
Substitutes:
GK	16	(Algeria) Kamel Soufi
CB	3	(Algeria) Safieddine Atmania
RB	20	(Algeria) Rayane Mahrouz		(substituted on) 86'
LB	23	(Algeria) Ilyes Chetti
AM	11	(Democratic Republic of the Congo) Glody Likonza		(substituted on) 73'
DM	26	(Algeria) Omar Boularas
LW	22	(Algeria) Moncif Boutaoui
RW	24	(Algeria) Mohamed Bouderbala		(substituted on) 73'
ST	9	(Algeria) Riad Benayad
Manager :
(Senegal) Lamine N'Diaye

GK	37	(Egypt) El Mahdy Soliman
DF	5	(Egypt) Hossam Abdelmaguid	(yellow card) 90+6'
DF	28	(Egypt) Mahmoud Hamdy
DF	24	(Egypt) Mohamed Ismail
DF	3	(Morocco) Mahmoud Bentayg	(yellow card) 90+6' (yellow-red card) 90+6'
MF	13	(Egypt) Ahmed Fatouh		(substituted off) 86'
MF	17	(Egypt) Mohamed Shehata (c)
MF	18	(Palestine) Adam Kaied		(substituted off) 73'
MF	19	(Egypt) Abdallah El Said
FW	32	(Angola) Chico Banza	(yellow card) 88'	(substituted off) 90+7'
FW	27	(Palestine) Oday Dabbagh		(substituted off) 86'
Substitutes:
GK	1	(Egypt) Mohamed Awad
DF	34	(Egypt) Mohamed Ibrahim
MF	11	(Egypt) Ahmed Abdel Rahim		(substituted on) 90+7'
MF	12	(Egypt) Ahmed Rabie		(substituted on) 86'
MF	26	(Egypt) El Sayed Osama
FW	9	(Egypt) Nasser Mansi
FW	30	(Tunisia) Seifeddine Jaziri
FW	31	(Egypt) Ahmed Sherif		(substituted on) 86'
FW	33	(Brazil) Juan Alvina		(substituted on) 73'
Manager:
(Egypt) Motamed Gamal

Assistant referees:
Ivanildo Lopes (Angola)
Elvis Noupoue (Cameroon)
Fourth official:
Abdelaziz Bouh (Mauritania)
Video assistant referee:
Daniel Nii Laryea (Ghana)
Assistant video assistant referees:
Babacar Sarr (Mauritania)
Dickens Nyagrowa (Kenya)

**Match rules**
- 90 minutes.
- Nine named substitutes, of which up to five may be used. (Note: Each team was only given three opportunities to make substitutions, excluding substitutions made at half-time.)

==== Statistics ====
First half
Statistic	USM Alger	Zamalek SC
Goals scored	0	0
Total shots	11	4
Shots on target	0	2
Saves	4	1
Ball possession	70%	30%
Corner kicks	5	2
Offsides	0	1
Yellow cards	2	0
Red cards	0	0

Second half
Statistic	USM Alger	Zamalek SC
Goals scored	1	0
Total shots	12	4
Shots on target	4	1
Saves	4	1
Ball possession	70%	30%
Corner kicks	0	1
Offsides	1	0
Yellow cards	2	3
Red cards	0	1

Overall
Statistic	USM Alger	Zamalek SC
Goals scored	0	1
Total shots	23	8
Shots on target	4	3
Saves	8	2
Ball possession	70%	30%
Corner kicks	5	3
Offsides	1	1
Yellow cards	4	3
Red cards	0	1

=== Second leg ===
USM Alger claimed their second ever CAF Confederation Cup title after defeating Zamalek 8–7 on penalties in a dramatic final at Cairo International Stadium. Zamalek won the second leg 1–0 thanks to an early penalty from Oday Dabbagh, leveling the aggregate score at 1–1 after USM Alger’s first-leg victory in Algiers. Despite strong pressure from the Egyptian side, USM Alger remained composed and pushed for an equalizer, with Ahmed Khaldi creating several dangerous chances throughout the match. The game eventually went to a tense penalty shootout where both teams converted their first seven attempts. The decisive moment came when Mohamed Shehata missed Zamalek’s eighth penalty by firing over the bar.

Substitute Glody Likonza then calmly converted the winning kick to secure the trophy for the Algerian club. Goalkeeper Oussama Benbot also played a crucial role, especially with a late save from Nasser Mansi that kept USM Alger alive before penalties. The victory earned USM Alger a record prize of USD 4 million and qualification for the CAF Super Cup, where they will face either Mamelodi Sundowns or AS FAR. Coach Lamine N'Diaye added another continental success to his career as the club further strengthened its place in African football history.

==== Details ====
16 May 2026
21:00 UTC+3

Zamalek (Egypt)	1–0	(Algeria) USM Alger
Dabbagh 5' (pen.)	Report
Penalties
El Said (penalty scored); Abdel Rahim (penalty scored); Abdelmaguid (penalty scored); Mansi (penalty scored); Jaziri (penalty scored); Alvina (penalty scored); El Sayed (penalty scored); Shehata (penalty missed)	7–8	(penalty scored) Draoui; (penalty scored) Khaldi; (penalty scored) Radouani; (penalty scored) Benayad; (penalty scored) Loucif; (penalty scored) Chetti; (penalty scored) Dehiri; (penalty scored) Likonza

Cairo International Stadium, Cairo
Attendance: 46,200
Referee: Pierre Atcho (Gabon)

**Zamalek**	**USM Alger**

GK	37	(Egypt) El Mahdy Soliman		(substituted off) 30'
DF	5	(Egypt) Hossam Abdelmaguid
DF	34	(Egypt) Mohamed Ibrahim
DF	24	(Egypt) Mahmoud Hamdy
DF	13	(Egypt) Ahmed Fatouh (c)		(substituted off) 82'
MF	17	(Egypt) Mohamed Shehata
MF	18	(Palestine) Adam Kaied		(substituted off) 61'
MF	19	(Egypt) Abdallah El Said	(yellow card) 64'
FW	32	(Angola) Chico Banza		(substituted off) 61'
FW	33	(Brazil) Juan Alvina
FW	27	(Palestine) Oday Dabbagh		(substituted off) 82'
Substitutes:
GK	1	(Egypt) Mohamed Awad		(substituted on) 30'
DF	28	(Egypt) Mahmoud Hamdy
MF	11	(Egypt) Ahmed Abdel Rahim		(substituted on) 82'
MF	12	(Egypt) Ahmed Rabie
MF	26	(Egypt) El Sayed Osama
MF	39	(Egypt) Mohamed El Sayed		(substituted on) 61'
FW	9	(Egypt) Nasser Mansi		(substituted on) 82'
FW	30	(Tunisia) Seifeddine Jaziri		(substituted on) 61'
FW	31	(Egypt) Ahmed Sherif
Manager:
(Egypt) Motamed Gamal

GK	25	(Algeria) Oussama Benbot
CB	4	(Cameroon) Che Malone
CB	13	(Algeria) Hocine Dehiri	(yellow card) 45+6'
RB	19	(Algeria) Saâdi Radouani (c)
LB	12	(Algeria) Haithem Loucif
DM	6	(Algeria) Zakaria Draoui
DM	14	(Algeria) Brahim Benzaza		(substituted off) 90+2'
AM	8	(Algeria) Islam Merili		(substituted off) 69'
AM	30	(Senegal) Aimé Tendeng
ST	7	(Algeria) Ahmed Khaldi
ST	29	(Ivory Coast) Dramane Kamagaté		(substituted off) 89'
Substitutes:
GK	16	(Algeria) Kamel Soufi
LB	2	(Algeria) Walid Kourdi
CB	3	(Algeria) Safieddine Atmania
RB	20	(Algeria) Rayane Mahrouz
LB	23	(Algeria) Ilyes Chetti		(substituted on) 90+2'
AM	11	(Democratic Republic of the Congo) Glody Likonza		(substituted on) 69'
DM	26	(Algeria) Omar Boularas
RW	24	(Algeria) Mohamed Bouderbala
ST	9	(Algeria) Riad Benayad		(substituted on) 89'
Manager :
(Senegal) Lamine N'Diaye

Assistant referees:
Boris Ditsoga (Gabon)
Amos Abeigne (Gabon)
Fourth official:
Tanguy Mebiame (Gabon)
Video assistant referee:
Haythem Guirat (Tunisia)
Assistant video assistant referees:
Maria River (Mauritius)
Carine Fomo (Cameroon)

**Match rules**
- 90 minutes.
- Penalty shoot-out if tied on aggregate and away goals.
- Nine named substitutes, of which up to five may be used.

==== Statistics ====
First half
Statistic	Zamalek SC	USM Alger
Goals scored	1	0
Total shots	1	3
Shots on target	1	1
Saves	1	0
Ball possession	36%	64%
Corner kicks	0	0
Offsides	2	0
Yellow cards	0	1
Red cards	0	0

Second half
Statistic	Zamalek SC	USM Alger
Goals scored	0	0
Total shots	2	6
Shots on target	1	0
Saves	0	1
Ball possession	36%	64%
Corner kicks	1	0
Offsides	4	1
Yellow cards	1	0
Red cards	0	0

Overall
Statistic	Zamalek SC	USM Alger
Goals scored	1	0
Total shots	3	9
Shots on target	2	1
Saves	1	1
Ball possession	36%	64%
Corner kicks	1	0
Offsides	6	1
Yellow cards	1	1
Red cards	0	0

== See also ==
- List of CAF Confederation Cup finals
- 2026 CAF Champions League final
- 2026 CAF Super Cup
