= 2025–26 CAF Confederation Cup knockout stage =

International football competition in Africa

- Dates: 14 March – 16 May 2026

Tournament statistics
- Matches played: 14
- Goals scored: 22 (1.57 per match)

The 2025–26 CAF Confederation Cup knockout stage started on 14 March with the quarter-finals and ended on 16 May 2026 with the second leg of the final to decide the champions of the 2025–26 CAF Confederation Cup. 8 teams competed in the knockout stage.

Times are local.

== Round and draw dates ==
The schedule was as follows.

Round	Draw date	First leg	Second leg
Quarter-finals	17 February 2026	14–15 March 2026	21–22 March 2026
Semi-finals	17 February 2026	10–11 April 2026	19 April 2026
Final	17 February 2026	9 May 2026	16 May 2026

== Format ==
Each tie in the knockout phase was played over two legs, with each team playing one leg at home. The team that scored more goals on aggregate over the two legs advanced to the next round. If the aggregate score was level, the away goals rule was applied, i.e. the team that scored more goals away from home over the two legs advanced. If the away goals rule was also equal, then extra time was not played and the winners were decided by a penalty shoot-out (Regulations III. 26 & 27). The mechanism of the draws for each round was as follows:

- In the draw for the quarter-finals, the four group winners were seeded, and the four group runners-up were unseeded. The seeded teams were drawn against the unseeded teams, with the seeded teams hosting the second leg. Teams from the same group could not be drawn against each other, while teams from the same association could be drawn against each other.
- In the draws for the semi-finals, there were no seedings, and teams from the same group or the same association could be drawn against each other. As the draws for the quarter-finals and semi-finals were held together before the quarter-finals were played, the identity of the quarter-final winners was not known at the time of the semi-final draw.

== Qualified teams ==
The knockout stage involved the 8 teams qualifying as winners and runners-up of each of the eight groups in the group stage.

Group	Winners	Runners-up
A	(Algeria) USM Alger	(Morocco) Olympic Safi
B	(Morocco) Wydad AC	(Democratic Republic of the Congo) Maniema Union
C	(Algeria) CR Belouizdad	(Republic of the Congo) AS Otohô
D	(Egypt) Zamalek	(Egypt) Al Masry

== Bracket ==
The bracket of the knockout stage was determined as follows:

Round	Matchups
Quarter-finals	(Group winners hosted the second leg, matchups decided by draw, teams from same group cannot play each other): QF1; QF2; QF3; QF4
Semi-finals	(Matchups and order of legs decided by draw, between winners QF1, QF2, QF3, QF4): SF1; SF2
Final	Winners SF1 and SF2 faced each other in two legs to decide the champions

The bracket was decided after the draw for the knockout stage, which was held on 17 February 2026, 12:00 GMT (12:00 local time, UTC+2), at the Egyptian Football Association headquarters in Cairo, Egypt.

Quarter-finals
(Democratic Republic of the Congo) Maniema Union	2	0	2
(Algeria) USM Alger (a)	1	1	2
(Morocco) Olympic Safi (a)	1	2	3
(Morocco) Wydad AC	1	2	3
(Egypt) Al Masry	1	0	1
(Algeria) CR Belouizdad (a)	1	0	1
(Republic of the Congo) AS Otohô	1	1	2
(Egypt) Zamalek	1	2	3

Semi-finals
(Algeria) USM Alger (a)	0	1	1
(Morocco) Olympic Safi	0	1	1
(Algeria) CR Belouizdad	0	0	0
(Egypt) Zamalek	1	0	1

Final
(Algeria) USM Alger (p)	1	0	1 (8)
(Egypt) Zamalek	0	1	1 (7)

== Quarter-finals ==
The draw for the quarter-finals was held on 17 February 2026.

=== Summary ===
The first legs were played on 14 and 15 March, and the second legs were played on 21 and 22 March 2026.

Team 1	Agg.	Team 2	1st leg	2nd leg
Al Masry (Egypt)	1–1 (a)	(Algeria) CR Belouizdad	1–1	0–0
Olympic Safi (Morocco)	3–3 (a)	(Morocco) Wydad AC	1–1	2–2
AS Otohô (Republic of the Congo)	2–3	(Egypt) Zamalek	1–1	1–2
Maniema Union (Democratic Republic of the Congo)	2–2 (a)	(Algeria) USM Alger	2–1	0–1

=== Matches ===
14 March 2026
22:00 UTC+2

Al Masry (Egypt)	1–1	(Algeria) CR Belouizdad
Mohsen 55' (pen.)	Report	Boussouar 90+1'

Suez Stadium, Suez
Referee: Jean-Jacques Ndala (DR Congo)
21 March 2026
20:00 UTC+1

CR Belouizdad (Algeria)	0–0	(Egypt) Al Masry
	Report

Nelson Mandela Stadium, Algiers
Referee: Brighton Chimene (Zimbabwe)

1–1 on aggregate. CR Belouizdad won on away goals.

15 March 2026
22:00 UTC+0

Olympic Safi (Morocco)	1–1	(Morocco) Wydad AC
Benabid 86' (o.g.)	Report	Vaca 67'

El Massira Stadium, Safi
Referee: Mohamed Maarouf (Egypt)
22 March 2026
20:00 UTC+1

Wydad AC (Morocco)	2–2	(Morocco) Olympic Safi
Moufid 45+9'; Ziyech 90+7'	Report	El Moudane 40' (pen.); Koné 90'

Stade Mohammed V, Casablanca
Referee: Ahmad Heeralall (Mauritius)

3–3 on aggregate. Olympic Safi won on away goals.

14 March 2026
14:00 UTC+1

AS Otohô (Republic of the Congo)	1–1	(Egypt) Zamalek
Atipo 13'	Report	Dabbagh 32'

Stade Alphonse Massemba-Débat, Brazzaville
Referee: Clément Kpan (Ivory Coast)
22 March 2026
18:00 UTC+2

Zamalek (Egypt)	2–1	(Republic of the Congo) AS Otohô
Abdelmaguid 17'; Dabbagh 24'	Report	Mavoungou 83'

Cairo International Stadium, Cairo
Referee: Peter Waweru (Kenya)

Zamalek won 3–2 on aggregate.

15 March 2026
15:00 UTC+2

Maniema Union (Democratic Republic of the Congo)	2–1	(Algeria) USM Alger
Pitroipa 41' (pen.); Moanda 65'	Report	Khaldi 53' (pen.)

Stade TP Mazembe, Lubumbashi
Referee: Louis Houngnandandé (Benin)
22 March 2026
20:00 UTC+1

USM Alger (Algeria)	1–0	(Democratic Republic of the Congo) Maniema Union
Benzaza 30'	Report

Stade du 5 Juillet, Algiers
Attendance: 16,000
Referee: Boubou Traoré (Mali)

2–2 on aggregate. USM Alger won on away goals.

== Semi-finals ==
The draw for the semi-finals was held on 17 February 2026 (after the quarter-finals draw).

=== Summary ===
The first legs were played on 10 and 11 April, and the second legs were played on 17 and 19 April 2026.

Team 1	Agg.	Team 2	1st leg	2nd leg
USM Alger (Algeria)	1–1 (a)	(Morocco) Olympic Safi	0–0	1–1
CR Belouizdad (Algeria)	0–1	(Egypt) Zamalek	0–1	0–0

=== Matches ===
11 April 2026
17:00 UTC+1

USM Alger (Algeria)	0–0	(Morocco) Olympic Safi
	Report

Stade du 5 Juillet, Algiers
Attendance: 16,000
Referee: Amin Mohamed Omar (Egypt)
19 April 2026
21:20 UTC+1 (Note: The match, originally scheduled for 20:00 GMT+1, was delayed to 21:20 GMT+1 due to spectators riots.)

Olympic Safi (Morocco)	1–1	(Algeria) USM Alger
Koné 75'	Report	Khaldi 45+4' (pen.)

El Massira Stadium, Safi
Referee: Samuel Uwikunda (Rwanda)

1–1 on aggregate. USM Alger won on away goals.

10 April 2026
20:00 UTC+1

CR Belouizdad (Algeria)	0–1	(Egypt) Zamalek
	Report	Alvina 28'

Nelson Mandela Stadium, Algiers
Referee: Abongile Tom (South Africa)
17 April 2026
18:00 UTC+2

Zamalek (Egypt)	0–0	(Algeria) CR Belouizdad
	Report

Cairo International Stadium, Cairo
Referee: Mahmood Ismail (Sudan)

Zamalek won 1–0 on aggregate.

== Final ==
The first was played on 9 May, and the second leg was played on 16 May 2026.

Team 1	Agg.	Team 2	1st leg	2nd leg
USM Alger (Algeria)	1–1 (8–7 p)	(Egypt) Zamalek	1–0	0–1

9 May 2026
20:00 UTC+1

USM Alger (Algeria)	1–0	(Egypt) Zamalek
Khaldi 90+8' (pen.)	Report

Stade du 5 Juillet, Algiers
Attendance: 50,000
Referee: Dahane Beida (Mauritania)
16 May 2026
21:00 UTC+3

Zamalek (Egypt)	1–0	(Algeria) USM Alger
Dabbagh 5' (pen.)	Report
Penalties
El Said (penalty scored); Abdel Rahim (penalty scored); Abdelmaguid (penalty scored); Mansi (penalty scored); Jaziri (penalty scored); Alvina (penalty scored); El Sayed (penalty scored); Shehata (penalty missed)	7–8	(penalty scored) Draoui; (penalty scored) Khaldi; (penalty scored) Radouani; (penalty scored) Benayad; (penalty scored) Loucif; (penalty scored) Chetti; (penalty scored) Dehiri; (penalty scored) Likonza

Cairo International Stadium, Cairo
Attendance: 46,200
Referee: Pierre Atcho (Gabon)

1–1 on aggregate. USM Alger won 8–7 on penalties.

== See also ==
- 2025–26 CAF Champions League knockout stage
