= 2025–26 CAF Confederation Cup group stage =

International football competition in Africa

- Dates: 22 November 2025 – 15 February 2026

Tournament statistics
- Matches played: 48
- Goals scored: 102 (2.13 per match)

The 2025–26 CAF Confederation Cup group stage began on 22 November 2025 and ended on 15 February 2026. 16 teams competed in the group stage to decide the eight places in the knockout stage of the 2025–26 CAF Confederation Cup.

== Draw ==
The draw for the group stage was held on 3 November 2025, 11:00 GMT (13:00 local time, UTC+2), in Johannesburg, South Africa. The 16 winners of the second round of qualifying rounds were drawn into four groups of four.

The teams were seeded by their performances in the CAF competitions for the previous five seasons (CAF 5-year ranking points shown next to every team). Each group contained one team from each of Pot 1, Pot 2, and Pot 3, and each team was allocated to the positions in their group according to their pot.

Pot	Pot 1	Pot 2	Pot 3	Pot 4
Teams	(Egypt) Zamalek (42 pts); (Morocco) Wydad AC (39 pts); (Algeria) USM Alger (37 pts); (Algeria) CR Belouizdad (36 pts)	(South Africa) Stellenbosch (15 pts); (Egypt) Al Masry (14 pts); (Democratic Republic of the Congo) Maniema Union (5 pts); (Mali) Djoliba (5 pts)	(South Africa) Kaizer Chiefs (5 pts); (Republic of the Congo) AS Otohô (2 pts)	(Ivory Coast) San Pédro; (Kenya) Nairobi United; (Morocco) Olympic Safi; (Tanzania) Azam; (Tanzania) Singida Black Stars; (Zambia) ZESCO United

== Format ==
In the group stage, each group was played on a home-and-away round-robin basis. The winners and runners-up of each group advanced to the quarter-finals of the knockout stage.

=== Tiebreakers ===
The teams were ranked according to points (3 points for a win, 1 point for a draw, 0 points for a loss). If tied on points, tiebreakers were applied in the following order (Regulations III. 20 & 21):

1. Points in head-to-head matches among tied teams;
2. Goal difference in head-to-head matches among tied teams;
3. Goals scored in head-to-head matches among tied teams;
4. Away goals scored in head-to-head matches among tied teams;
5. If more than two teams were tied, and after applying all head-to-head criteria above, a subset of teams was still tied, all head-to-head criteria above were reapplied exclusively to this subset of teams;
6. Goal difference in all group matches;
7. Goals scored in all group matches;
8. Away goals scored in all group matches;
9. Drawing of lots.

== Schedule ==
The schedule of each matchday was as follows.

Matchday	Dates	Matches
Matchday 1	22–23 November 2025	Team 1 vs. Team 4, Team 2 vs. Team 3
Matchday 2	28–30 November 2025	Team 3 vs. Team 1, Team 4 vs. Team 2
Matchday 3	24–25 January 2026	Team 4 vs. Team 3, Team 1 vs. Team 2
Matchday 4	1 February 2026	Team 3 vs. Team 4, Team 2 vs. Team 1
Matchday 5	7–8 February 2026	Team 4 vs. Team 1, Team 3 vs. Team 2
Matchday 6	14–15 February 2026	Team 1 vs. Team 3, Team 2 vs. Team 4

== Groups ==
All times are local.

=== Group A ===
Pos	Team	Pld	W	D	L	GF	GA	GD	Pts	Qualification	USMA	OCS	DAC	FCSP
1	(Algeria) USM Alger	6	4	2	0	9	4	+5	14	Advance to knockout stage	—	0–0	2–0	3–2
2	(Morocco) Olympic Safi	6	4	1	1	7	4	+3	13	Advance to knockout stage	0–1	—	2–1	2–1
3	(Mali) Djoliba	6	1	1	4	5	7	−2	4		0–0	0–1	—	4–0
4	(Ivory Coast) San Pédro	6	1	0	5	8	14	−6	3		2–3	0–1	2–0	—

Source: CAF
Rules for classification: Group stage tiebreakers
23 November 2025
16:00 UTC+0

Djoliba (Mali)	0–1	(Morocco) Olympic Safi
	Report	Errahouli 29'

Stade du 26 Mars, Bamako
Referee: Daniel Nii Laryea (Ghana)
23 November 2025
20:00 UTC+1

USM Alger (Algeria)	3–2	(Ivory Coast) San Pédro
Ghacha 17'; Alilet 61'; Radouani 82'	Report	Kamagaté 65'; M. Karamoko 90+7'

Stade du 5 Juillet, Algiers
Referee: Tewodros Mitiku (Ethiopia)

28 November 2025
20:00 UTC+1

Olympic Safi (Morocco)	0–1	(Algeria) USM Alger
	Report	Draoui 84'

El Massira Stadium, Safi
Referee: Mohamed Maarouf (Egypt)
30 November 2025
16:00 UTC+0

San Pédro (Ivory Coast)	2–0	(Mali) Djoliba
Kamagaté 21', 29'	Report

Laurent Pokou Stadium, San Pédro
Referee: Brighton Chimene (Zimbabwe)

25 January 2026
16:00 UTC+0

San Pédro (Ivory Coast)	1–2	(Morocco) Olympic Safi
A. Karamoko 36'	Report	Khannouss 1'; El Moudane 40' (pen.)

Laurent Pokou Stadium, San Pédro
Referee: Abdelkerim Ousmane (Chad)
24 January 2026
20:00 UTC+1

USM Alger (Algeria)	2–0	(Mali) Djoliba
Draoui 13'; Khaldi 84'	Report

Stade du 5 Juillet, Algiers
Referee: Mohamed Diraneh (Djibouti)

1 February 2026
16:00 UTC+0

Djoliba (Mali)	0–0	(Algeria) USM Alger
	Report

Stade du 26 Mars, Bamako
Referee: Ahmed Arajiga (Tanzania)
1 February 2026
20:00 UTC+1

Olympic Safi (Morocco)	2–1	(Ivory Coast) San Pédro
Errahouli 30'; Koné 89'	Report	Allou 90+2'

El Massira Stadium, Safi
Referee: Tewodros Mitiku (Ethiopia)

8 February 2026
16:00 UTC+0

San Pédro (Ivory Coast)	2–3	(Algeria) USM Alger
I. Dosso 6', 38'	Report	Malone 2'; Likonza 5'; Bouderbala 90+2'

Laurent Pokou Stadium, San Pédro
Referee: Naby Laye Touré (Guinea)
8 February 2026
20:00 UTC+1

Olympic Safi (Morocco)	2–1	(Mali) Djoliba
El Moudane 1', 50'	Report	A. Diarra 14' (pen.)

El Massira Stadium, Safi
Referee: Omar Artan (Somalia)

14 February 2026
20:00 UTC+1

USM Alger (Algeria)	0–0	(Morocco) Olympic Safi
	Report

Stade du 5 Juillet, Algiers
Referee: Sulaiman Kamara (Sierra Leone)
15 February 2026
16:00 UTC+0

Djoliba (Mali)	4–0	(Ivory Coast) San Pédro
Touré 4', 24'; Keita 55'; Glougbé 86'	Report

Stade du 26 Mars, Bamako
Referee: Jean Ouattara (Burkina Faso)

=== Group B ===
Pos	Team	Pld	W	D	L	GF	GA	GD	Pts	Qualification	WAC	ASMU	AFC	NU
1	(Morocco) Wydad AC	6	5	0	1	9	2	+7	15	Advance to knockout stage	—	1–0	2–0	3–0
2	(Democratic Republic of the Congo) Maniema Union	6	4	0	2	8	3	+5	12	Advance to knockout stage	2–1	—	2–0	3–0
3	(Tanzania) Azam	6	3	0	3	4	6	−2	9		0–1	1–0	—	1–0
4	(Kenya) Nairobi United	6	0	0	6	1	11	−10	0		0–1	0–1	1–2	—

Source: CAF
Rules for classification: Group stage tiebreakers
23 November 2025
14:00 UTC+1

Maniema Union (Democratic Republic of the Congo)	2–0	(Tanzania) Azam
Panzi 43'; Ozome 85'	Report

Stade des Martyrs, Kinshasa
Referee: Joseph Ogabor (Nigeria)
23 November 2025
20:00 UTC+1

Wydad AC (Morocco)	3–0	(Kenya) Nairobi United
Boucheta 3'; Bouchouari 44'; Rayhi 86'	Report

Larbi Zaouli Stadium, Casablanca
Referee: Alhadi Allaou Mahamat (Chad)

28 November 2025
19:00 UTC+3

Azam (Tanzania)	0–1	(Morocco) Wydad AC
	Report	Amrabat 57'

Amaan Stadium, Zanzibar City (Zanzibar)
Referee: Antoine Effa (Cameroon)
30 November 2025
16:00 UTC+3

Nairobi United (Kenya)	0–1	(Democratic Republic of the Congo) Maniema Union
	Report	Mboma Kinda 66'

Moi International Sports Centre, Nairobi
Referee: Aklesso Gnama (Togo)

25 January 2026
16:00 UTC+3

Nairobi United (Kenya)	1–2	(Tanzania) Azam
Odhiambo 13'	Report	Kitambala 17'; Mohammed 78' (o.g.)

Nyayo National Stadium, Nairobi
Referee: Chanshi Kasongo (Zambia)
25 January 2026
20:00 UTC+1

Wydad AC (Morocco)	1–0	(Democratic Republic of the Congo) Maniema Union
Moufid 81'	Report

Stade Mohammed V, Casablanca
Referee: Vincent Kaboré (Burkina Faso)

1 February 2026
15:00 UTC+2

Maniema Union (Democratic Republic of the Congo)	2–1	(Morocco) Wydad AC
Namboka 33'; Benabid 61' (o.g.)	Report	Hannouri 66' (pen.)

Stade TP Mazembe, Lubumbashi
Referee: Mohamed Ali Moussa (Niger)
1 February 2026
19:00 UTC+3

Azam (Tanzania)	1–0	(Kenya) Nairobi United
Salum 12'	Report

Amaan Stadium, Zanzibar City (Zanzibar)
Referee: Gerson Angono (Equatorial Guinea)

7 February 2026
19:00 UTC+3

Azam (Tanzania)	1–0	(Democratic Republic of the Congo) Maniema Union
Kanouté 24'	Report

Amaan Stadium, Zanzibar City (Zanzibar)
Referee: Messie Nkounkou (Congo)
8 February 2026
16:00 UTC+3

Nairobi United (Kenya)	0–1	(Morocco) Wydad AC
	Report	Ben Yedder 89'

Moi International Sports Centre, Nairobi
Referee: Ahmad Heeralall (Mauritius)

15 February 2026
14:00 UTC+0

Wydad AC (Morocco)	2–0	(Tanzania) Azam
Msindo 64' (o.g.); Nassi 90+4'	Report

Stade Mohammed V, Casablanca
Referee: Emmanuel Mensah (Liberia)
15 February 2026
15:00 UTC+2

Maniema Union (Democratic Republic of the Congo)	3–0	(Kenya) Nairobi United
Namboka 5', 29'; Mboma Kinda 44'	Report

Stade TP Mazembe, Lubumbashi
Referee: Amin Mohamed Omar (Egypt)

=== Group C ===
Pos	Team	Pld	W	D	L	GF	GA	GD	Pts	Qualification	CRB	ASO	SFC	SBS
1	(Algeria) CR Belouizdad	6	5	0	1	11	5	+6	15	Advance to knockout stage	—	2–1	2–0	2–0
2	(Republic of the Congo) AS Otohô	6	3	0	3	10	6	+4	9	Advance to knockout stage	4–1	—	3–0	2–1
3	(South Africa) Stellenbosch	6	1	2	3	2	9	−7	5 (Note: Ranked on away goals scored in head-to-head matches: Stellenbosch 1, Singida Black Stars 0.)		0–3	1–0	—	0–0
4	(Tanzania) Singida Black Stars	6	1	2	3	3	6	−3	5		0–1	1–0	1–1	—

Source: CAF
Rules for classification: Group stage tiebreakers
Notes:
22 November 2025
20:00 UTC+1

CR Belouizdad (Algeria)	2–0	(Tanzania) Singida Black Stars
Chukwu 5' (o.g.); Benguit 14'	Report

Nelson Mandela Stadium, Algiers
Referee: Fabrício Duarte (Cape Verde)
23 November 2025
15:00 UTC+2

Stellenbosch (South Africa)	1–0	(Republic of the Congo) AS Otohô
Cupido 90+3'	Report

Cape Town Stadium, Cape Town
Referee: Mohamed El Baroudi (Morocco)

29 November 2025
14:00 UTC+1

AS Otohô (Republic of the Congo)	4–1	(Algeria) CR Belouizdad
Bowamba 12'; Diallo 26'; Duvan 29'; Dion 65'	Report	Meziane 81' (pen.)

Stade Alphonse Massemba-Débat, Brazzaville
Referee: Celso Alvação (Mozambique)
30 November 2025
19:00 UTC+3

Singida Black Stars (Tanzania)	1–1	(South Africa) Stellenbosch
Tchakei 90+1'	Report	Phili 52'

Amaan Stadium, Zanzibar City (Zanzibar)
Referee: Lamin Jammeh (Gambia)

25 January 2026
19:00 UTC+3

Singida Black Stars (Tanzania)	1–0	(Republic of the Congo) AS Otohô
Rupia 37'	Report

Amaan Stadium, Zanzibar City (Zanzibar)
Referee: Hicham Temsamani (Morocco)
25 January 2026
20:00 UTC+1

CR Belouizdad (Algeria)	2–0	(South Africa) Stellenbosch
Belhocini 5'; El Melali 90+5' (pen.)	Report

Nelson Mandela Stadium, Algiers
Referee: Mutaz Ibrahim (Libya)

1 February 2026
14:00 UTC+1

AS Otohô (Republic of the Congo)	2–1	(Tanzania) Singida Black Stars
Nzaou 52', 80'	Report	Gnadou 89'

Stade Alphonse Massemba-Débat, Brazzaville
Referee: Aklesso Gnama (Togo)
1 February 2026
15:00 UTC+2

Stellenbosch (South Africa)	0–3	(Algeria) CR Belouizdad
	Report	Ben Hammouda 19'; Belhocini 80'; Abbaci 88'

Cape Town Stadium, Cape Town
Referee: Abdallah Jammeh (Gambia)

8 February 2026
14:00 UTC+1

AS Otohô (Republic of the Congo)	3–0	(South Africa) Stellenbosch
Nzaou 38'; Kone 43', 79'	Report

Stade Alphonse Massemba-Débat, Brazzaville
Referee: Babacar Sarr (Mauritania)
8 February 2026
19:00 UTC+3

Singida Black Stars (Tanzania)	0–1	(Algeria) CR Belouizdad
	Report	Belhocini 3'

Amaan Stadium, Zanzibar City (Zanzibar)
Referee: Adalbert Diouf (Senegal)

15 February 2026
17:00 UTC+1

CR Belouizdad (Algeria)	2–1	(Republic of the Congo) AS Otohô
Belhocini 14'; El Melali 41'	Report	Diallo 68'

Nelson Mandela Stadium, Algiers
Referee: Omar Sallah (Gambia)
15 February 2026
18:00 UTC+2

Stellenbosch (South Africa)	0–0	(Tanzania) Singida Black Stars
	Report

Cape Town Stadium, Cape Town
Referee: Hillary Hambaba (Zambia)

=== Group D ===
Pos	Team	Pld	W	D	L	GF	GA	GD	Pts	Qualification	ZAM	MAS	KCFC	ZUFC
1	(Egypt) Zamalek	6	3	2	1	6	4	+2	11	Advance to knockout stage	—	0–0	2–1	1–0
2	(Egypt) Al Masry	6	3	1	2	9	7	+2	10 (Note: Ranked on goal difference in all group matches: Al Masry +2, Kaizer Chiefs +1.)	Advance to knockout stage	1–2	—	2–1	2–0
3	(South Africa) Kaizer Chiefs	6	3	1	2	7	6	+1	10		1–1	2–1	—	1–0
4	(Zambia) ZESCO United	6	1	0	5	3	8	−5	3		1–0	2–3	0–1	—

Source: CAF
Rules for classification: Group stage tiebreakers
Notes:
23 November 2025
18:00 UTC+2

Al Masry (Egypt)	2–1	(South Africa) Kaizer Chiefs
Mugisha 59' (pen.); Hashem 87'	Report	Solomons 66'

Suez Stadium, Suez
Referee: Washington Dolo (Liberia)
23 November 2025
21:00 UTC+2

Zamalek (Egypt)	1–0	(Zambia) ZESCO United
Jaziri 42'	Report

Cairo International Stadium, Cairo
Referee: Mohamed Diraneh (Djibouti)

28 November 2025
15:00 UTC+2

ZESCO United (Zambia)	2–3	(Egypt) Al Masry
Kouablan 5'; Musukuma 87'	Report	Hashem 4'; Temine 24'; Deghmoum 68'

Levy Mwanawasa Stadium, Ndola
Referee: André Kolissala (Central African Republic)
29 November 2025
15:00 UTC+2

Kaizer Chiefs (South Africa)	1–1	(Egypt) Zamalek
Sobhy 90+6' (o.g.)	Report	Jaziri 3'

Peter Mokaba Stadium, Polokwane
Referee: Samuel Uwikunda (Rwanda)

25 January 2026
15:00 UTC+2

ZESCO United (Zambia)	0–1	(South Africa) Kaizer Chiefs
	Report	Mmodi 2'

Levy Mwanawasa Stadium, Ndola
Referee: Noris Arissol (Seychelles)
25 January 2026
21:00 UTC+2

Zamalek (Egypt)	0–0	(Egypt) Al Masry
	Report

Borg El Arab Stadium, Alexandria
Referee: Georges Gatogato (Burundi)

1 February 2026
15:00 UTC+2

Kaizer Chiefs (South Africa)	1–0	(Zambia) ZESCO United
Lilepo 14'	Report

Moses Mabhida Stadium, Durban
Referee: Mweshitsama Naftal (Namibia)
1 February 2026
21:00 UTC+2

Al Masry (Egypt)	1–2	(Egypt) Zamalek
Mohsen 34' (pen.)	Report	Abdelmaguid 24' (pen.); Dabbagh 75'

Suez Stadium, Suez
Referee: Lotfi Bekouassa (Algeria)

8 February 2026
15:00 UTC+2

ZESCO United (Zambia)	1–0	(Egypt) Zamalek
Hiver 61' (pen.)	Report

Levy Mwanawasa Stadium, Ndola
Referee: Abdou Mefire (Cameroon)
8 February 2026
15:00 UTC+2

Kaizer Chiefs (South Africa)	2–1	(Egypt) Al Masry
Silva 39' (pen.); McCarthy 60'	Report	Deghmoum 57'

Peter Mokaba Stadium, Polokwane
Referee: Daniel Nii Laryea (Ghana)

14 February 2026
18:00 UTC+2

Zamalek (Egypt)	2–1	(South Africa) Kaizer Chiefs
Alvina 53'; El Said 72'	Report	Lilepo 75'

Suez Canal Stadium, Ismailia
Referee: Mahmood Ismail (Sudan)
14 February 2026
18:00 UTC+2

Al Masry (Egypt)	2–0	(Zambia) ZESCO United
Bambo 63'; Mohsen 81'	Report

Suez Stadium, Suez
Referee: Pacifique Ndabihawenimana (Burundi)

== See also ==
- 2025–26 CAF Champions League group stage
