= Ahmed Fatouh =

Egyptian footballer (born 1998)

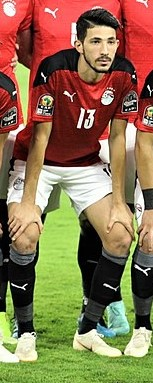
- Fatouh with Egypt in 2021

Personal information
- Full name: Ahmed Mohamed Abou El Fotouh Mohamed
- Date of birth: 22 March 1998 (age 28)
- Place of birth: Cairo Egypt
- Height: 1.77 m (5 ft 10 in)
- Positions: Left-back; left wing-back

Team information
- Current team: Zamalek
- Number: 13

Youth career
- Zamalek

Senior career*
Years	Team	Apps	(Gls)
2016–	Zamalek	132	(4)
2016–2017	→ ENPPI (loan)	50	(10)
2019–2020	→ Smouha (loan)	33	(0)

International career
–2018	Egypt U20	7	(1)
2016–2021	Egypt U23		
2019–	Egypt	42	(1)
Medal record
Representing Egypt
Men's football
Africa Cup of Nations
Runner-up	2021 Cameroon
- * Club domestic league appearances and goals as of 22 December 2025

Ahmed Mohamed Abou El Fotouh Mohamed (Arabic: أحمد محمد أبو الفتوح محمد; born 22 March 1998), simply known as Ahmed Fatouh (Arabic: أحمد فتوح), is an Egyptian footballer who plays for Egyptian Premier League side Zamalek and the Egypt national team as a left-back or left wing-back.

== Club career ==
=== Zamalek ===
Fatouh was loaned to ENPPI from 2016 to 2017 and between 2019 and 2020, Fatouh was loaned Smouha before returning to Zamalek club in which then he started to play in the first team. Fatouh won the best left back of the season in 2021/2022.

From 2018 to 2025, Ahmed Fatouh would win the league twice, the cup 3 times, the caf confederation and the caf super cup.

In 2026 Fatouh won the league with the club for the third time and was a runner up for the CAF Confederation losing in a penalty‑shootout against the Algerian side USM Alger. Fatouh won the best left back of the season.

== International career ==
Fatouh won the Under-23 Africa Cup of Nations trophy in 2019.

Fatouh featured for Egypt in the 2021 Africa Cup of Nations final against Senegal. He was later named in the 26-man squad for the 2026 FIFA World Cup.

== Career statistics ==
=== International goals ===
Scores and results list Egypt's goal tally first.

No.	Date	Venue	Opponent	Score	Result	Competition
1.	11 October 2021	Benina Martyrs Stadium, Benghazi, Libya	Libya	1–0	3–0	2022 FIFA World Cup qualification

== Conviction ==
On 11 August 2024, a car accident caused by Aboul Fotouh on the Cairo-Alexandria road led to the death of a 55-year-old man. Aboul Fotouh was accompanied by his teammate, goalkeeper Mohamed Sobhy. The examination proved that Aboul Fotouh was under the influence of drugs. He was detained for 4 days pending investigation. On 13 August, his detention was renewed for 15 days. He first appeared in court on 19 August. The case was adjourned until 16 September and he will remain in prison. On 16 September, Abou El Fotouh was released on a 50,000 Egyptian pound bail, with the case scheduled for review on 22 October. The Matrouh Criminal Court decided to postpone the trial of Aboul Fotouh to the November 16 session for pleading. Members of the victim's family attended, acknowledging the reconciliation.

On 16 November 2024, the Matrouh Criminal Court sentenced Aboul Fotouh to one year in prison, suspended for three years, along with a fine of 20,000 EGP, and revoked his driver's license. A written agreement was also made between the player and the victim's family, in which Aboul Fotouh committed to paying a 10 million EGP blood money to the family. The agreement also stipulated that the family would not pursue any further legal claims against him. On 9 February 2025, the court rejected Aboul Fotouh's appeal against his sentence, maintaining the original ruling, despite efforts by his defense team to challenge the decision.

== Honours ==
Zamalek

- Egyptian Premier League: 2020-21, 2021-22, 2025–26
- Egypt Cup: 2017–18, 2020–21, 2024–25
- CAF Confederation Cup: 2023–24
- CAF Super Cup: 2024

Egypt

- Africa U-23 Cup of Nations Champions: 2019

Individual

- FIFA Arab Cup Team of the Tournament: 2021
