= Mohamed Ismail (footballer) =

Egyptian footballer (born 1999)

Personal information
- Date of birth: 1 August 1999 (age 27)
- Place of birth: Ismailia, Egypt
- Height: 1.80 m (5 ft 11 in)
- Position: Centre-back

Team information
- Current team: Zamalek
- Number: 24

Youth career
- ENPPI

Senior career*
Years	Team	Apps	(Gls)
2019–2023	ENPPI	19	(0)
2019–2020	→Aswan (loan)	20	(3)
2023–2025	ZED	44	(0)
2025–	Zamalek	7	(0)

International career^{‡}
2025–	Egypt	1	(0)
- * Club domestic league appearances and goals as of 23:55, 21 December 2025 (UTC) ‡ National team caps and goals as of 23:55, 28 December 2025 (UTC)

Mohamed Ismail (Arabic: محمد إسماعيل; born 1 August 1999) is an Egyptian professional footballer who plays as a centre-back for Egyptian Premier League club Zamalek and the Egypt national team.

== Club career ==
A youth product of ENPPI, Ismail moved to Aswan on loan in the Egyptian Premier League for the 2019–20 season where he began his career before returning to ENPPI. In 2023, he joined ZED where he stayed 2 seasons. On 30 July 2025, he transferred to Zamalek.

== International career ==
Ismail was called up to the Egypt national team for the 2025 Africa Cup of Nations.

== Honours ==
Zamalek

- Egyptian Premier League: 2025–26
