= Ahmed Sherif =

Egyptian footballer (born 2003)

Personal information
- Full name: Ahmed Sherif Mostafa Kamal
- Date of birth: 8 February 2003 (age 23)
- Position: Forward

Team information
- Current team: Zamalek
- Number: 31

Youth career
- Wadi Degla

Senior career*
Years	Team	Apps	(Gls)
2020–2021	Wadi Degla	21	(2)
2021–2025	Pharco	99	(13)
2025–	Zamalek		

International career^{‡}
2022–2023	Egypt U20	5	(0)
- * Club domestic league appearances and goals as of 22:59, 15 May 2025 (UTC) ‡ National team caps and goals as of 22:59, 15 May 2025 (UTC)

Ahmed Sherif Mostafa Kamal (Arabic: أحمد شريف; born 8 February 2003) is an Egyptian professional footballer who plays as a forward for Egyptian Premier League side Zamalek.

== Club career ==
Following impressive performances with Wadi Degla, Sherif and teammate Karim El Debes were linked with a move to Al Ahly in August 2021. Despite a deal reportedly being agreed between the two clubs, Sherif would instead join Pharco in October 2021. His performances for Pharco drew the attention of Al Ahly again in March 2024, with the Red Castle manager Marcel Koller reportedly showing interest in Sherif and teammate Walid Farag.

== International career ==
Having represented Egypt at under-20 level, Sherif was called up to the Egypt national football team for the first time in August 2022. He spent time training with the team, before being moved to the under-23 side for their training camp.

== Personal life ==
On 7 December 2021, on the way back from training, Sherif was in a car accident that led to the death of his fiancee.

== Career statistics ==
=== Club ===
As of 15 May 2025.

Appearances and goals by club, season and competition
Club	Season	League			National Cup (Note: Includes Egypt Cup)		League Cup (Note: Includes Egyptian League Cup)		Other		Total	
Club	Season	Division	Apps	Goals	Apps	Goals	Apps	Goals	Apps	Goals	Apps	Goals
Wadi Degla	2019–20	Egyptian Premier League	9	0	0	0	0	0	0	0	9	0
Wadi Degla	2020–21	Egyptian Premier League	12	2	1	0	0	0	0	0	13	2
Wadi Degla	Total		21	2	1	0	0	0	0	0	22	2
Pharco	2021–22	Egyptian Premier League	31	3	1	0	1	0	0	0	33	3
Pharco	2022–23	Egyptian Premier League	21	2	1	0	0	0	0	0	22	2
Pharco	2023–24	Egyptian Premier League	27	3	0	0	3	0	0	0	30	3
Pharco	2024–25	Egyptian Premier League	20	5	0	0	0	0	0	0	20	5
Pharco	Total		99	13	2	0	4	0	0	0	105	13
Career total			120	15	3	0	4	0	0	0	127	15

== Honours ==
Zamalek

- Egyptian Premier League: 2025–26
