= Chico Banza =

Angolan footballer (born 1998)

Personal information
- Full name: Francisco Gonçalves Sacalumbo
- Date of birth: 17 December 1998 (age 27)
- Place of birth: Huambo, Angola
- Height: 1.82 m (6 ft 0 in)
- Position: Winger

Team information
- Current team: Zamalek
- Number: 81

Youth career
- –2016: Atlético Petróleos
- 2016–2017: Real Sambila
- 2017–2018: Leixões

Senior career*
Years	Team	Apps	(Gls)
2017–2018	Leixões B	18	(11)
2018	Leixões	5	(0)
2018–2020	Marítimo	1	(0)
2020–2021	Nea Salamis	4	(0)
2021	→ P.O. Xylotymbou (loan)	13	(14)
2021–2022	P.O. Xylotymbou	3	(1)
2022–2023	Nea Salamis	32	(2)
2023–2025	Anorthosis Famagusta	23	(6)
2024–2025	→ Portimonense (loan)	15	(6)
2025	Estrela da Amadora	13	(1)
2025–	Zamalek	19	(3)

International career^{‡}
2016–2017	Angola U20	7	(6)
2018–	Angola	25	(1)
- * Club domestic league appearances and goals as of 29 August 2025 ‡ National team caps and goals as of 14 November 2026

Francisco Gonçalves Sacalumbo (born 17 December 1998), commonly known as Chico Banza, or simply Chico, is an Angolan professional footballer who plays as a winger for Zamalek.

== Early life ==
Francisco Gonçalves Sacalumbo was born on 17 December 1998 in Huambo, Angola. He grew up in the Cacuilo neighbourhood of Huambo.

== Club career ==
Chico Banza was snapped up by Portuguese side Leixões from his native Real Sambila, following his performance at the 2017 Toulon Tournament. After starring for the club's 'B' team in the Portuguese lower divisions, he was handed his first team debut on 18 March 2018, playing 68 minutes in a 1–1 draw with Sporting CP B before being replaced by Ricardo Barros. He later played for Marítimo before moving to Cyprus, where he represented Nea Salamis and P.O. Xylotymbou. In 2022, he returned to Nea Salamis.

In August 2023, Banza signed a four-year contract with Cypriot First Division side Anorthosis Famagusta. He was loaned to Portuguese club Portimonense for the 2024–25 season. On 30 January 2025, however, he completed a permanent move to Estrela da Amadora, signing a deal that runs until 2028.

In July 2025, Banza joined Egyptian club Zamalek on a four-year contract. He won the league with the club in the 2025-2026 season.

== International career ==
Chico Banza represented Angola at the 2017 Toulon Tournament, where he finished as one of the top scorers with four goals in three games.

On 3 December 2025, Banza was called up to the Angola squad for the 2025 Africa Cup of Nations.

== Career statistics ==
=== Club ===
As of match played 26 August 2023.

Club	Season	League			National Cup		League Cup		Continental		Other		Total	
Club	Season	Division	Apps	Goals	Apps	Goals	Apps	Goals	Apps	Goals	Apps	Goals	Apps	Goals
Leixões B	2017–18	Porto FA Honour Division	18	11	–		–		–		–		18	11
Leixões	2017–18	LigaPro	4	0	–		–		–		–		4	0
Leixões	2018–19	LigaPro	1	0	–		–		–		–		1	0
Leixões	Total		5	0	0	0	0	0	0	0	0	0	5	0
Marítimo	2018–19	Primeira Liga	1	0	–		–		–		–		1	0
Marítimo	2019–20	Primeira Liga	–		–		–		–		–		–	
Marítimo	Total		1	0	0	0	0	0	0	0	0	0	1	0
Nea Salamis	2020–21	Cyta Championship	4	0	–		–		–		–		4	0
Nea Salamis	2022–23	Cyta Championship	32	2	3	1	–		–		–		35	3
Nea Salamis	Total		36	2	3	1	0	0	0	0	0	0	39	3
P.O. Xylotymbou (loan)	2020–21	Cypriot Second Division	13	14	–		–		–		–		13	14
P.O. Xylotymbou	2021–22	Cypriot Second Division	3	1	–		–		–		–		3	1
Anorthosis	2023–24	Cyta Championship	2	0	0	0	–		–		–		2	0
Career total			78	28	3	1	0	0	0	0	0	0	81	29

=== International ===
As of matches played 14 November 2026.

National team	Year	Apps	Goals
Angola	2018	3	0
Angola	2023	3	0
Angola	2024	3	0
Angola	2025	12	0
Angola	2026	4	1
Total		25	1

Scores and results list Angola's goal tally first, score column indicates score after each Banza goal.

No.	Date	Venue	Opponent	Score	Result	Competition
1	14 November 2026	11 November Stadium, Luanda, Angola	South Sudan	1–0	2–0	2027 Africa Cup of Nations qualification

== Honours ==
Zamalek

- Egyptian Premier League: 2025–26
