= Mahmoud Bentayg =

Moroccan footballer (born 1999)

Personal information
- Date of birth: 30 October 1999 (age 27)
- Place of birth: Casablanca, Morocco
- Height: 1.81 m (5 ft 11 in)
- Position: Left-back

Team information
- Current team: Zamalek
- Number: 3

Youth career
- 2012–2019: AJ Sportive

Senior career*
Years	Team	Apps	(Gls)
2020–2022	Tihad AS	45	(5)
2022–2023	Raja CA	24	(2)
2023–2025	Saint-Étienne	20	(1)
2024–2025	Saint-Étienne B	3	(0)
2024–2025	→ Zamalek (loan)	13	(1)
2025–	Zamalek	11	(0)

International career
2025–	Morocco	1	(0)
Medal record
Representing Morocco
Men's football
FIFA Arab Cup
Winner	2025 Qatar	Team
- * Club domestic league appearances and goals as of 06:52, 2 July 2025 (UTC)

Mahmoud Bentayg (Arabic: محمود بنتايج; born 30 October 1999) is a Moroccan professional footballer who plays as a left-back for Egyptian Premier League club Zamalek and the Morocco national team.

He began his career as a youth player with AJ Sportive before joining Tihad AS in 2020, where he took part and scored in the 2020–21 Confederation Cup, the club's first African participation. In 2022, he finally joined Raja CA after the negotiations have failed the year before.

== Early life ==
Bentayg was born on 30 October 1999 in Hay Mohammadi, an industrial and residential district in the northeast of Casablanca. At young age, he began to play football in the neighborhood amateur teams before joining AJ Sportive.

== Club career ==
=== AJ Sportive ===
In 2019, Bentayg joined the first team which then played in the Moroccan fourth division. At the end of the 2019–20 season, the team were relegated to the fifth division and Bentayg left the club.

=== Tihad AS ===
In November 2020, Bentayg joined Tihad AS who was playing in Botola 2, and quickly established himself as a starter.

On 23 December, he played his first game in international competitions in the first round of the 2020–21 Confederation Cup against ESAE FC. He scored a free kick and assisted the fourth goal (4–0).

On 21 February 2021, he opened the scoring with a lobbed shot against Nkana FC in the next round of the Confederation Cup.

In the 2021 summer, he were very close to join Raja CA but the transfer fails. In December, the negotiations resume but still without success. At the end of the 2021–22 season, his good performances cannot prevent his team from being relegated to the Third Division.

=== Raja CA ===
On 18 July 2022, Mahmoud Bentayg finally joined Raja CA by signing a three-year contract. On 10 October in Niamey, he made his debut with in the second round of the 2022–23 Champions League against AS Nigelec (0–2 victory).

On 19 October, he entered at half-time against Hassania Agadir in Botola. In the 93rd minute, he wins a penalty which will be scored by Mohamed Nahiri, giving Raja their first Botola victory of the season.

On 5 November, while Raja was losing to JS Soualem, he caused a penalty which allowed the team to equalize and win (4–0). On 6 January 2023 against Ittihad Tanger, he delivered his first assist for Hamza Khabba who scored the third goal (3–0 victory).

On 14 January 14, he scored his first goal with Raja CA against RS Berkane thanks to a lobbed shot (2–0 win). Mondher Kebaier stated that he is delighted with Bentayg's performances since he broke through the starting line-up, and had asked him to continue his development in the upcoming games. Some media wrote that he is one of the main reasons Raja regained its level after a bad season start.

=== Saint-Étienne ===
On 25 August 2023, Saint-Étienne announced the signing of Bentayg.

==== Zamalek ====
On 31 August 2024, Bentayg signed for Egyptian Premier League club Zamalek on loan with an option for the deal to be made permanent and the purchase clause in the contract was activated on March 11, 2025.

== Honours ==
Zamalek

- Egyptian Premier League: 2025–26
- Egypt Cup: 2024–25
- CAF Super Cup: 2024

Morocco

- FIFA Arab Cup: 2025

Individual

- Botola Team of the Season: 2022–23
