= Adam Kaied =

Palestinian footballer

Personal information
- Full name: Adam Hamza Kaied
- Date of birth: 2 March 2002 (age 24)
- Place of birth: Helsingborg, Sweden
- Height: 1.77 m (5 ft 10 in)
- Positions: Left winger; central midfielder

Team information
- Current team: Zamalek
- Number: 18

Youth career
- 2012–2020: Helsingborg

Senior career*
Years	Team	Apps	(Gls)
2021–2022	Helsingborg	36	(5)
2022	→ Stabæk (loan)	3	(0)
2023–2025	NAC Breda	23	(1)
2025–	Zamalek	18	(1)

International career^{‡}
2018	Sweden U16	3	(0)
2019	Sweden U17	2	(0)
2020	Sweden U18	1	(0)
2021	Sweden U20	2	(0)
2025–	Palestine	4	(0)
- * Club domestic league appearances and goals as of 26 March 2025 ‡ National team caps and goals as of 26 March 2025

Adam Hamza Kaied (Arabic: آدم حمزة كايد; born 2 March 2002) is a professional footballer who plays as a left winger for Egyptian Premier League club Zamalek. Born in Sweden, he plays for the Palestine national team.

== Early life ==
Kaied was born in Helsingborg, Sweden to Palestinian parents, originally from Tira and Haifa.

== Club career ==
Kaied joined Helsingborgs IF at the age of 10, and made his way into the senior team. Making his unofficial debut in a friendly match in January 2020, his official debut came one year later in the 2020–21 Svenska Cupen.

Before the end of the summer transfer window of 2022, he was acquired on loan by Norwegian club Stabæk with an option to buy. Winning re-promotion to the first tier, Stabæk did not exercise the option. Just before the end of the winter 2023 transfer window, Kaied signed for NAC Breda.

On 20 July 2025, Kaied signed a three-year contract with Egyptian side Zamalek.

== International career ==
Kaied represented Sweden at various youth international levels before choosing to play for the Palestine national team. On 20 March 2025, he made his senior debut for Palestine in a World Cup qualifier against Jordan.

== Honours ==
Zamalek

- Egyptian Premier League: 2025–26
