= Mohamed Awad (Egyptian footballer) =

Egyptian footballer (born 1992)

Mohamed Awad محمد عواد
Personal information
- Full name: Mohamed Awad Hussein Moussa
- Date of birth: 6 July 1992 (age 34)
- Place of birth: Ismailia, Egypt
- Height: 1.84 m (6 ft 0 in)
- Position: Goalkeeper

Team information
- Current team: Zamalek
- Number: 99

Youth career
- 2002–2012: Ismaily

Senior career*
| Years | Team | Apps | (Gls) |
| 2012–2019 | Ismaily | 104 | (0) |
| 2014–2015 | → Al Masry (loan) | 22 | (0) |
| 2018–2019 | → Al-Wehda (loan) | 27 | (0) |
| 2019– | Zamalek | 83 | (0) |

International career
| 2008 | Egypt U18 | 1 | (0) |
| 2011 | Egypt U20 | 3 | (0) |
| 2018– | Egypt | 2 | (0) |
- * Club domestic league appearances and goals as of 17 August 2026

Mohamed Awad Hussein Moussa (Arabic: محمد عواد حسين موسى; born 6 July 1992) is an Egyptian footballer who plays as goalkeeper for Egyptian Premier League club Zamalek and the Egypt national team.

== The Start ==
Started with the Ismaily S.C youth team, Saafan Al-Saghir became his goalkeeper coach since he was in the youth team until he reached the first team. He played his first game in the Egyptian Premier League on 25 December 2013 in front of El Qanah FC, and the match ended with a 2–1 win over Ismaily SC.

== Al-Masry ==
On December 3, 2014 Ismaily SC officially rejected the Al-Masry request for the loan until the end of the season. The Brazilian coach refused to sell the goalkeeper and refused Awad to leave the club in any case. However, Awad did not participate in any official match since the beginning of the season, Awad wanted to leave the team for a loan, and the team agreed to let Awad go out for a loan to Al-Masry to be able to participate in the official games, to return to the lineups Ismaily SC beginning from the following season, and then loaned Mohamed Awad out for Al-Masry for 6 months starting from Winter transfer period for 600 thousand pounds until the end of the season. Awad participated in 22 matches in which he maintained a single clean sheet during ten matches. On 9 March 2015 Ismaily SC officials decided to terminate the loan with the end of the football season and refused to renew the loan contract due to the need of Awad during the following period. There was an agreement between the three, Ismaily SC, Al-Masry and Awad that in January, if all parties agree to extend the loan, only then he would stay, but Ismaily SC officials announced that their decision was rejecting the loan renewal.

== Transfer to the Portuguese league ==
On Friday evening 12 June 2015, Ismaily SC received a formal fax from C.F. União to sign the player during the summer transfer period and the beginning of the following season, and the management of the club accepted the departure of the player to the outside professional, but Ismaily SC has made a decision to sell the goalkeeper for a million and a half euros to approve the departure of goalkeeper, However, the club's offer was rejected because of the poor money supply. The Portuguese club made a new bid on June 23, 2016, during the summer transfer period for a million euros, but the Ismaily SC club refused the bid for Awad.

== Back to Ismaily SC ==
After his loan to the Al-Masry, Awad returned to Ismaily SC again, and the first match after his return was against El-Entag El-Harby SC on 21 October 2015 when he managed to keep the clean sheet.

== Egypt national football team call-up ==
On 14 November 2017, Mohamed Awad was called up to the Egypt national football team by Héctor Cúper.

In May 2018 he was named in Egypt's preliminary squad for the 2018 World Cup in Russia.

=== International ===
Statistics accurate as of match played 14 October 2019.

Egypt
| Year | Apps | Goals |
|---|---|---|
| 2018 | 1 | 0 |
| 2019 | 1 | 0 |
| Total | 2 | 0 |

== Honours ==
Zamalek

- Egyptian Premier League 2020–21, 2021–22, 2025–26
- Egypt Cup: 2018–19, 2020–21, 2024–25
- Egyptian Super Cup: 2020
- CAF Confederation Cup: 2023–24
- CAF Super Cup: 2020, 2024
