= Mohamed Sobhy (footballer, born 1999) =

Egyptian footballer

Mohamed Sobhy محمد صبحي
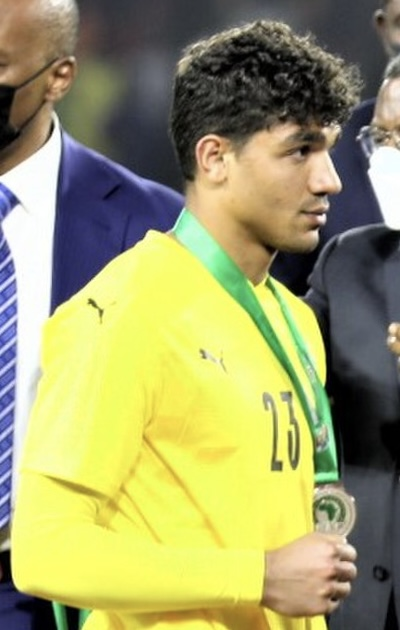
- Sobhy with Egypt at the 2021 Africa Cup of Nations

Personal information
- Full name: Mohamed Sobhy Mohamed Daader
- Date of birth: 15 July 1999 (age 27)
- Place of birth: Egypt
- Height: 1.85 m (6 ft 1 in)
- Position: Goalkeeper

Team information
- Current team: Zamalek
- Number: 16

Youth career
- –2018: Petrojet

Senior career*
Years	Team	Apps	(Gls)
2018–2019	Petrojet	7	(0)
2019–	Zamalek	35	(0)
2020–2021	→ Al Ittihad (loan)	33	(0)
2021–2022	→ Pharco (loan)	29	(0)

International career
2019–2021	Egypt U23	11	(0)
2022–	Egypt	4	(0)
Medal record
Men's football
Representing Egypt
Africa Cup of Nations
Runner-up	2021 Cameroon
Africa U-23 Cup of Nations
Winner	Egypt 2019	Egypt U23
- * Club domestic league appearances and goals

Mohamed Sobhy Mohamed Daader (Arabic: محمد صبحي محمد دادر; born 15 July 1999) is an Egyptian professional footballer who plays as a goalkeeper for Egyptian Premier League club Zamalek and the Egypt national team.

== International career ==
On 2 December 2025, Sobhy was called up to the Egypt squad for the 2025 Africa Cup of Nations.

== Honours ==
Zamalek

- Egyptian Premier League: 2025–26
- Egypt Cup: 2024–25
- CAF Confederation Cup: 2023–24
- CAF Super Cup: 2024

Egypt U23

- Africa U-23 Cup of Nations: 2019

Individual

- Africa U-23 Cup of Nations Best Goalkeeper: 2019
- Africa U-23 Cup of Nations Team of the tournament: 2019
