= Ahmed Abdel Rahim =

Egyptian footballer (born 2003)

Personal information
- Full name: Ahmed Abdel Rahim
- Date of birth: 1 January 2003 (age 23)

Team information
- Current team: Zamalek
- Number: 11

Youth career
- –2020: Zamalek

Senior career*
Years	Team	Apps	(Gls)
2022–	Zamalek		(0)

International career
	Egypt U20	0	(0)
- * Club domestic league appearances and goals

Ahmed Abdel Rahim (Arabic: أحمد عبد الرحيم; born 1 January 2003) is an Egyptian professional footballer who plays as a midfielder for Egyptian Premier League club Zamalek.

== Honours ==
Zamalek

- Egyptian Premier League: 2025–26
