= 2024 CAF Super Cup =

TotalEnergies CAF Super Cup Riyadh 2024
- Match programme cover
Al Ahly	Zamalek
(Egypt)	(Egypt)
1	1
- Zamalek won 4–3 on penalties
- Date: 27 September 2024
- Venue: Kingdom Arena, Riyadh, Saudi Arabia
- Man of the Match: Nasser Mansi (Zamalek)
- Referee: Mutaz Ibrahim (Libya)
- Weather: Fair; 32 °C (90 °F); 16% humidity

The 2024 CAF Super Cup, officially TotalEnergies CAF Super Cup Riyadh 2024 for sponsorship reasons, was the 33rd CAF Super Cup, an annual football match in Africa organized by the Confederation of African Football (CAF), between the winners of the previous season's two CAF club competitions, the CAF Champions League and the CAF Confederation Cup.

The match was played between the 2023–24 CAF Champions League winners, Al Ahly, and the 2023–24 CAF Confederation Cup winners, Zamalek, both from Egypt and both sides of the Cairo derby, on 27 September 2024 at the Kingdom Arena in Riyadh, Saudi Arabia.

Zamalek won the match 4–3 on penalties, after the original time ended 1–1, to secure their fifth CAF Super Cup title. The match was the third continental encounter between two Egyptian clubs, and the second in a Super Cup.

The match set numerous records. This was Zamalek's fifth title, all of which came against opponents from the UNAF region. Zamalek also became the first CAF Confederation Cup representative to win the competition more than once. Additionally, for the first time in CAF Super Cup history, a team from the CAF Confederation Cup won three consecutive editions. Meanwhile, Al Ahly tied Espérance de Tunis's record of losing two consecutive CAF Super Cups after winning the CAF Champions League; Espérance lost the 2019 and 2020 editions to Raja CA and Zamalek, respectively, while Al Ahly lost the previous edition to USM Alger.

== Teams ==
Team	Zone	Qualification	Previous participation (bold indicates winners)
(Egypt) Al Ahly	UNAF (North Africa)	2023–24 CAF Champions League winners	11 (1994, **2002**, **2006**, **2007**, **2009**, **2013**, **2014**, 2015, **2021 (May)**, **2021 (December)**, 2023)
(Egypt) Zamalek	UNAF (North Africa)	2023–24 CAF Confederation Cup winners	5 (**1994**, **1997**, 2001, **2003**, **2020**)

== Format ==
The CAF Super Cup was played as a single match at a neutral venue, with the CAF Champions League winners designated as the "home" team for administrative purposes. If the score is tied at the end of regulation, extra time was not played, and the penalty shoot-out was used to determine the winner (CAF Champions League Regulations XXVII and CAF Confederation Cup Regulations XXV).

== Venue ==
Location of the host city of the 2024 CAF Super Cup.	City	Stadium
Location of the host city of the 2024 CAF Super Cup.	Riyadh	Kingdom Arena
Location of the host city of the 2024 CAF Super Cup.	**Capacity: 27,000**	

== Match ==
27 September 2024
21:00 UTC+3

Al Ahly (Egypt)	1–1	(Egypt) Zamalek
Abou Ali 44' (pen.)	Report	Nasser Mansi 77'
Penalties
Rabia (penalty scored); Kamal (penalty scored); Attiyat Allah (penalty missed); Taher (penalty scored); Abou Ali (penalty missed)	3–4	(penalty scored) El Said; (penalty scored) Mathlouthi; (penalty scored) Mansi; (penalty scored) Abdelmaguid

Kingdom Arena, Riyadh (Saudi Arabia)
Referee: Mutaz Ibrahim (Libya)

**Al Ahly**	**Zamalek**

GK	1	(Egypt) Mohamed El Shenawy (c)
RB	30	(Egypt) Mohamed Hany		(substituted off) 27'
CB	6	(Egypt) Yasser Ibrahim
CB	5	(Egypt) Ramy Rabia
LB	18	(Morocco) Yahia Attiyat Allah
CM	22	(Egypt) Emam Ashour		(substituted off) 66'
CM	13	(Egypt) Marwan Attia		(substituted off) 84'
CM	8	(Egypt) Akram Tawfik	(yellow card) 32'
RW	10	(South Africa) Percy Tau		(substituted off) 66'
LW	14	(Egypt) Hussein El Shahat		(substituted off) 84'
CF	9	(Palestine) Wessam Abou Ali
Substitutes:
GK	31	(Egypt) Mostafa Shobeir
DF	3	(Egypt) Omar Kamal		(substituted on) 27'
DF	15	(Morocco) Achraf Dari
MF	17	(Egypt) Amr El Solia
MF	19	(Egypt) Mohamed Magdy		(substituted on) 66'
MF	36	(Egypt) Ahmed Nabil Koka		(substituted on) 84'
FW	7	(Egypt) Mahmoud Kahraba
FW	12	(Morocco) Reda Slim		(substituted on) 84'
FW	29	(Egypt) Taher Mohamed		(substituted on) 66'
Manager:
(Switzerland) Marcel Koller

GK	1	(Egypt) Mohamed Awad
RB	4	(Egypt) Omar Gaber (c)		(substituted off) 89'
CB	24	(Tunisia) Hamza Mathlouthi	(yellow card) 37'
CB	5	(Egypt) Hossam Abdelmaguid
LB	3	(Morocco) Mahmoud Bentayg
CM	22	(Egypt) Nasser Maher		(substituted off) 76'
CM	8	(Egypt) Nabil Emad	(yellow card) 89'	(substituted off) 89'
CM	19	(Egypt) Abdallah El Said
RW	25	(Egypt) Ahmed Sayed
LW	7	(Egypt) Mostafa Shalaby		(substituted off) 63'
CF	30	(Tunisia) Seifeddine Jaziri	(yellow card) 38'	(substituted off) 76'
Substitutes:
GK	32	(Egypt) Mahmoud El Shenawy
DF	6	(Egypt) Mostafa El Zenary
DF	36	(Egypt) Mohamed Hamdy
MF	15	(Egypt) Ziad Kamal		(substituted on) 89'
MF	17	(Egypt) Mohamed Shehata		(substituted on) 89'
FW	9	(Egypt) Nasser Mansi	(yellow card) 90+8' (pso)	(substituted on) 76'
FW	10	(Egypt) Shikabala
FW	11	(Palestine) Omar Faraj		(substituted on) 76'
FW	21	(Poland) Konrad Michalak		(substituted on) 63'
Manager:
(Portugal) José Gomes

Man of the Match:
Nasser Mansi (Zamalek)

Assistant referees:
Attia Issa (Libya)
Khalil Hassani (Tunisia)
Fourth official:
Omar Abdulkadir Artan (Somalia)
Video assistant referee:
Akhona Makalima (South Africa)
Assistant video assistant referees:
Abongile Tom (South Africa)
Zakaria Brinsi (Morocco)

**Match rules**
- 90 minutes.
- Penalty shoot-out if scores level.
- Nine named substitutes, of which up to five may be used. (Note: Each team was only given three opportunities to make substitutions, excluding substitutions made at half-time.)

== See also ==
- 1994 CAF Super Cup
