= Pierre Atcho =

Gabonese football referee (born 1992)

- Atcho at the 2026 FIFA World Cup
- Born: Pierre Ghislain Atcho; 1992 (age 33–34); Gabon

Domestic
Years	League	Role
??–present	Football in Gabon	Referee

International
Years	League	Role
2018–present	FIFA listed	Referee

Pierre Ghislain Atcho (born 1992) is a Gabonese football referee who has been on the FIFA International Referees List since 2018.

== Career ==
After earning his FIFA badge, Atcho began refereeing in international-level matches, including the 2019–20 CAF Confederation Cup, where a led a group stage match between the Libyan club Al Nasr Benghazi SC and Bidvest Wits F.C. of South Africa. Atcho has also taken part in CAF Champions League editions, including a second leg semifinal between AS FAR and RS Berkane, both from Morocco. Among his biggest matches are the 2023 CAF Super Cup between Al Ahly SC (Egypt) and USM Alger (Algeria), a knockout-stage game at the 2023 Africa Cup of Nations and a semi-final between Senegal and Egypt at the 2025 Africa Cup of Nations in Morocco.

Atcho has been part of refereeing teams for youth tournaments within the Confederation of African Football, including the 2019 U-17 Africa Cup of Nations in Tanzania, where he oversaw a group-stage match between Guinea and Morocco. In November of that year, Atcho led a group-stage group in the 2019 U-23 Africa Cup of Nations in Egypt. In the 2021 U-20 Africa Cup of Nations, Atcho reached to a semi-final game between Uganda and Tunisia.

In May 2026, Atcho was chosen as the main referee of the second-leg final of the 2026 CAF Confederation Cup final match between the Egyptian club Zamalek SC and the Algerian team USM Alger at the Cairo International Stadium in Cairo. Atcho was assisted by fellow Gabonese Boris Marlais and Amos Ndong, while Patrick Mbaïa, also from Gabon, served as the fourth official. At the VAR, assisting Atcho were Tunisian referee Haythem Guirat along with Maria River of Mauritius and Carine Fomo of Cameroon.

Outside CAF competitions, Atcho oversaw matches at the 2023 FIFA U-17 World Cup, including a round of 16 game between Spain and Japan in Surakarta. He has been selected by FIFA to participate in the 2026 FIFA World Cup as a central referee, accompanied by assistant referees Boris Ditsoga and Amos Abeigne Ndong, also from Gabon.

== Selected performances ==
2025 Africa Cup of Nations – Morocco
Date	Match	Result	Round	Venue
24 December 2025	Algeria – Sudan	3–0	Group stage	Moulay Hassan Stadium, Rabat
5 January 2026	Egypt – Benin	3–1	Round of 16	Adrar Stadium, Agadir
14 January 2026	Senegal – Egypt	1–0	Semifinal	Tangier Grand Stadium, Tangier
2026 FIFA World Cup – Canada/United States/Mexico
Date	Match	Result	Round	Venue
16 June 2026	Iraq – Norway	1–4	Group stage	Gillette Stadium, Foxborough
24 June 2026	Panama – Croatia	0–1	Group stage	BMO Field, Toronto
