= Mohamed Shehata (footballer) =

Egyptian footballer (born 2001)

Mohamed Shehata محمد شحاتة
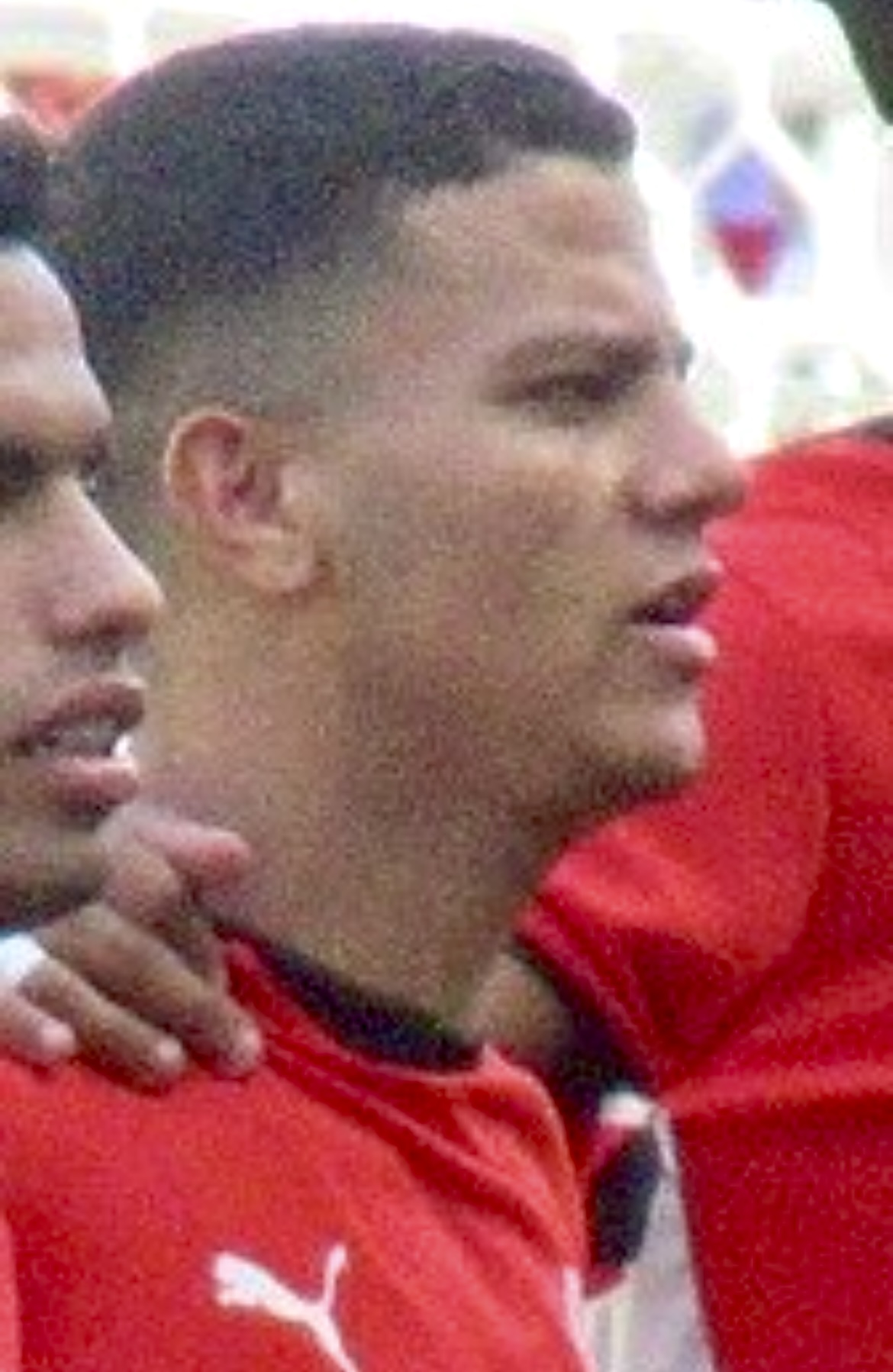
- Shehata lining up for Egypt Olympic at the 2024 Summer Olympics

Personal information
- Full name: Mohamed Mohamed Shehata Mahmoud
- Date of birth: 8 February 2001 (age 25)
- Place of birth: Cairo, Egypt
- Height: 1.80 m (5 ft 11 in)
- Position: Midfielder

Team information
- Current team: Zamalek
- Number: 17

Senior career*
Years	Team	Apps	(Gls)
2019–2024	Tala'ea El Gaish SC	91	(2)
2024–	Zamalek	34	(3)

International career^{‡}
2020–2021	Egypt U20	1	(0)
2022–	Egypt U23	11	(0)
2024–	Egypt	4	(0)
Medal record
Representing Egypt
U-23 Africa Cup of Nations
Runner-up	Morocco 2023	U-23 Team
- * Club domestic league appearances and goals ‡ National team caps and goals as of 22 December 2025

Mohamed Mohamed Shehata Mahmoud (Arabic: محمد محمد شحاتة محمود; born 8 February 2001) is an Egyptian professional footballer who plays as a midfielder for Egyptian Premier League club Zamalek and the Egypt national team.

== International career ==
On 2 December 2025, Shehata was called up to the Egypt squad for the 2025 Africa Cup of Nations.

== Honours ==
Tala'ea El Gaish

- Egyptian Super Cup: 2020–21

Zamalek

- Egyptian Premier League: 2025–26
- Egypt Cup: 2024–25
- CAF Confederation Cup: 2023–24
- CAF Super Cup: 2024
