= Mohamed El Sayed (footballer, born 2006) =

Egyptian footballer (born 2006)

Mohamed El Sayed محمد السيد
Personal information
- Full name: Mohamed El Sayed
- Date of birth: 20 May 2006 (age 20)
- Position: Midfielder

Team information
- Current team: Zamalek
- Number: 39

Youth career
- Zamalek

Senior career*
Years	Team	Apps	(Gls)
2022–	Zamalek	21	(1)
- * Club domestic league appearances and goals

Mohamed El Sayed (Arabic: محمد السيد; born 20 May 2006) is an Egyptian professional footballer who plays as a midfielder for Egyptian Premier League club Zamalek.

== Honours ==
Zamalek

- Egyptian Premier League: 2025–26
