= 2025–26 Egypt Cup =

Tournament details
- Dates: 3 October 2025 – 10 May 2026
- Teams: 72

Final positions
- Champions: Pyramids (2nd title)
- Runners-up: ZED

Tournament statistics
- Top goal scorer: Mostafa Ziko

The 2025–26 Egypt Cup was the 94th edition of the premier knockout football competition in Egypt, organized by the Egyptian Football Association (EFA). The tournament began on 3 October 2025.

Pyramids triumphed over the defending champions ZED with an 2–1 victory, securing a place in the Egyptian Super Cup.

== Format ==
The competition began with a first preliminary round featuring 72 teams. Nile Premier League clubs will enter the tournament at the Round of 32. Extra time will only be applied starting from the Round of 32, and VAR (Video Assistant Referee) technology is not utilized in single-elimination knockout rounds.

== Schedule ==
Round	Draw date	Matches
First preliminary round		3 October 2025
Second preliminary round		2–6 November 2025
Round of 32	15 November 2025	27–30 November 2025, 1–4 December 2025, January 2026

== Matches ==
=== Round of 32 ===
The draw took place on 15 November 2025. The record title-holder, Al Ahly SC, was eliminated after a 2-1 loss to WE SC in extra time.

All matches were played on 27 December 2025.

27 December 2025	Al Ahly	1–2 (a.e.t.)	WE SC	Cairo
17:00 UTC+2	Kamal 41'		Fawzi 82', 110'	Stadium: Al Salam Stadium

27 December 2025	Pharco	2–0	Telefonat Bani Sweif
17:00 UTC+2

27 December 2025	National Bank	4–1	Bur Fouad
17:00 UTC+2	Faisal (?); Annor (?); Grendo (?)

27 December 2025	ENPPI	1–0	Al Mokawloon
17:00 UTC+2

27 December 2025	Petrojet	1–0	Wadi Degla
17:00 UTC+2

27 December 2025	Modern Sport	1–0	El Qanah
17:00 UTC+2

27 December 2025	El Gouna	2–1	Asyut Petroleum
17:00 UTC+2

27 December 2025	Pyramids	2–0	FC Masar
17:00 UTC+2

27 December 2025	Zamalek	1–0	Baladiyyat Al Mehalla
17:00 UTC+2

27 December 2025	Ceramica Cleopatra	2–0	Abu Qair Semad
17:00 UTC+2

27 December 2025	Tala'ea El Gaish	2–0	El Sekka El Hadid
17:00 UTC+2

27 December 2025	Al Ittihad	0–1	Kahrabaa Ismailia
17:00 UTC+2

27 December 2025	Haras El Hodoud	3–1	Ismaily
17:00 UTC+2

27 December 2025	Smouha	3–1	Ghazl El Mahalla
17:00 UTC+2

27 December 2025	ZED	1–0	G FC
17:00 UTC+2

27 December 2025	Al Masry	4–2	Dikernis
17:00 UTC+2

=== Round of 16 ===
27 November 2025	National Bank	4–1	Haras El Hodoud
17:00 UTC+2	Faisal (?); Annor (?); Grendo (?)

27 November 2025	ENPPI	1–0	Al Mokawloon
17:00 UTC+2

27 November 2025	Petrojet	1–0	Wadi Degla
17:00 UTC+2

27 November 2025	Pyramids	3–0	El Gouna
17:00 UTC+2

27 November 2025	Zamalek	1–0	Baladiyyat Al Mehalla
17:00 UTC+2

27 November 2025	Ceramica Cleopatra	2–0	Abu Qair Semad
17:00 UTC+2

27 November 2025	Tala'ea El Gaish	2–0	El Sekka El Hadid
17:00 UTC+2

27 November 2025	Haras El Hodoud	3–0	Ismaily
17:00 UTC+2

27 November 2025	Smouha	3–1	Ghazl El Mahalla
17:00 UTC+2

27 November 2025	ZED	1–0	G FC
17:00 UTC+2

27 November 2025	Al Masry	4–2	Dikernis
17:00 UTC+2

=== Quarter-finals ===
13 February 2026	Haras El Hodoud	1–1 (a.e.t.) (2–4 p)	ZED
17:00 UTC+2

21 February 2026	Itesalat	0–2	ENPPI
17:00 UTC+2

13 March 2026	Ceramica Cleopatra	0–0 (a.e.t.) (5–6 p)	Tala'ea El Gaish
17:00 UTC+2

18 March 2026	Petrojet	0–2	Pyramids
17:00 UTC+2			Mayele (?); Atef (?)

=== Semi-finals ===
3 April 2026	Pyramids	4–0	ENPPI	Cairo
17:00 UTC+2	Mayele 13'; Atef 18'; Touré 25'; Sobhi 63'			Stadium: Petro Sport Stadium

18 March 2026	Tala'ea El Gaish	1–3	ZED	Cairo
21:30 UTC+2

=== Final ===
10 May 2026	Pyramids	2–1	ZED	Cairo
20:30 UTC+3	Hafez 45+1' (pen.); Mayele 57'		Raafat Khalil 90+4'	Stadium: Cairo International Stadium; Referee: Mohamed Maarouf
