= Amine Hiver =

Chadian footballer (born 1998)

Personal information
- Date of birth: 11 April 1998 (age 28)
- Place of birth: N'Djamena, Chad
- Height: 1.76 m (5 ft 9 in)
- Position: Forward

Team information
- Current team: ZESCO United

Senior career*
| Years | Team | Apps | (Gls) |
| –2018 | Gazelle FC | | |
| 2018–2022 | Mangasport | | |
| 2022 | Colombe | | |
| 2023–2024 | Aigle | | |
| 2024– | ZESCO United | | |

International career^{‡}
| 2023– | Chad | 11 | (0) |
- * Club domestic league appearances and goals as of 18 September 2024 ‡ National team caps and goals as of 18 September 2024

Amine Hiver (born 11 April 1998) is a Chadian footballer who plays as a forward for ZESCO United.

== Career ==
Hiver was born on 11 April 1998 in N'Djamena, Chad. He started his career with Chadian side Gazelle FC. In 2018, he signed for Gabonese side Mangasport. He helped the club win the league. In 2022, he signed for Cameroonian side Colombe. In 2023, he signed for Cameroonian side Aigle. He was regarded as an undisputed starter while playing for the club. He was their top scorer during the 2023/24 season with nine goals. In 2024, he signed for Zambian side ZESCO United.

Hiver is a Chad international. On 23 September 2020, he debuted for the Chad national football team during a 2–3 loss to the Sudan national football team. He played for the Chad national football team for 2025 Africa Cup of Nations qualification and 2026 FIFA World Cup qualification.

== Style of play ==
Hiver mainly operates as a forward. He is right-footed. He can also operate as a right-winger. He is known for his versatility. He has been described as having "appreciable technical qualities... lightning speed and... [a] keen eye for goal".
