= Hossam Abdelmaguid =

Egyptian footballer (born 2001)

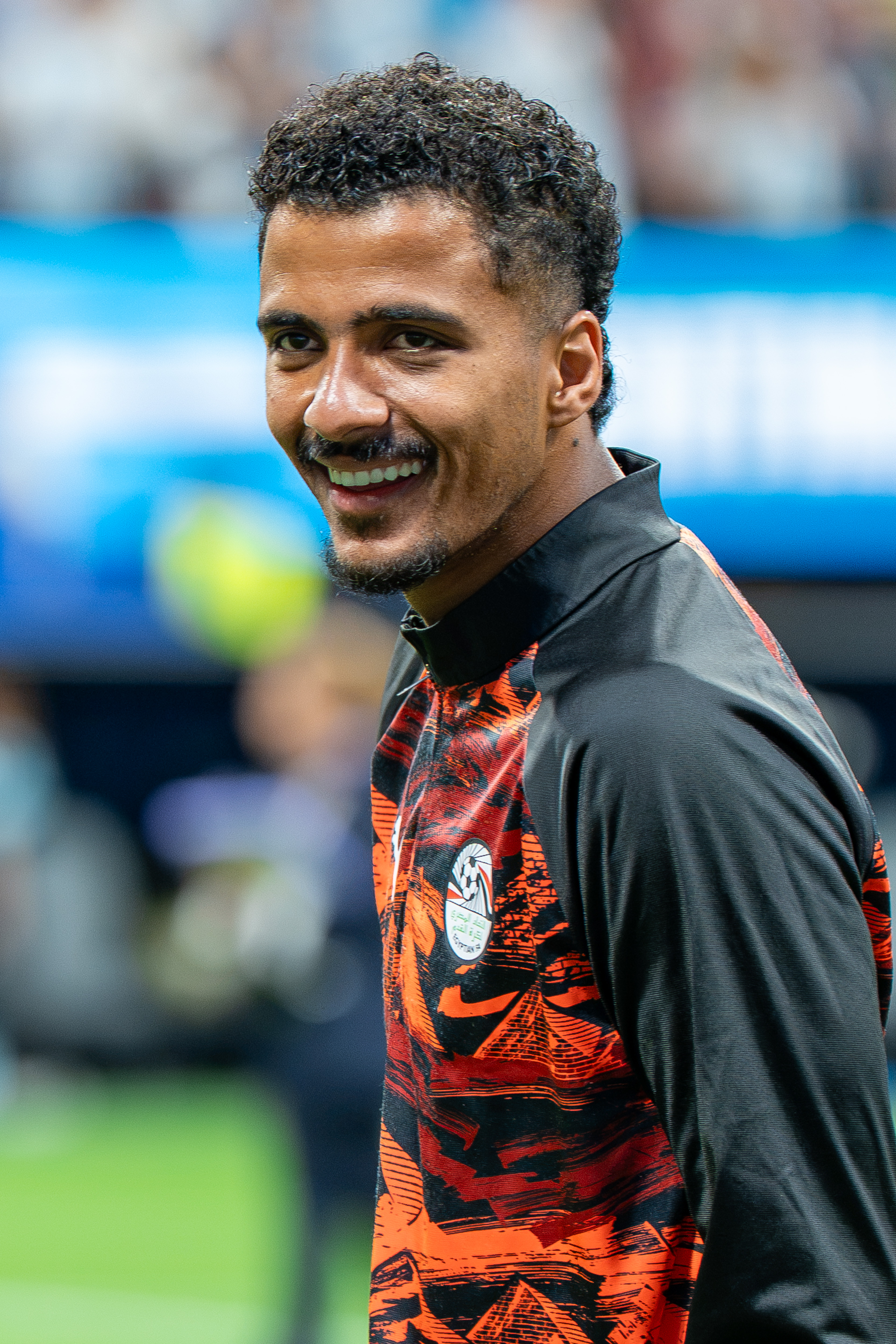
- Abdelmaguid with Egypt in 2026

Personal information
- Full name: Hossam Abdelmaguid Abdelsalam Abdelmaguid
- Date of birth: 30 April 2001 (age 25)
- Place of birth: Giza, Egypt
- Height: 1.93 m (6 ft 4 in)
- Position: Centre-back

Team information
- Current team: Ludogorets Razgrad
- Number: 4

Youth career
- –2020: Zamalek

Senior career*
Years	Team	Apps	(Gls)
2020–2026	Zamalek	145	(10)
2026–	Ludogorets Razgrad	3	(0)

International career^{‡}
2022–2024	Egypt U23	20	(2)
2023–	Egypt	15	(0)
- * Club domestic league appearances and goals ‡ National team caps and goals as of 9 September 2026

Hossam Abdelmaguid Abdelsalam Abdelmaguid (Note: Arabic: حسام عبد المجيد عبد السلام عبد المجيد) (born 30 April 2001) is an Egyptian professional footballer who plays as a centre-back for Bulgarian First League club Ludogorets Razgrad and the Egypt national team.

== Club career ==
Abdelmaguid started his career at Zamalek, before joining Bulgarian First League club Ludogorets Razgrad in July 2026.

== International career ==
On 2 December 2025, Abdelmaguid was called up to the Egypt squad for the 2025 Africa Cup of Nations. On 20 May 2026, he was named in the 26-man squad for the 2026 FIFA World Cup.

== Honours ==
Zamalek

- Egyptian Premier League: 2020–21, 2021–22, 2025–26
- Egypt Cup: 2020–21, 2024–25
- CAF Confederation Cup: 2023–24
- CAF Super Cup: 2024

== Career statistics ==
=== Club ===
As of 22 August 2020.

Club	Season	League			Cup		Continental		Other		Total	
Club	Season	Division	Apps	Goals	Apps	Goals	Apps	Goals	Apps	Goals	Apps	Goals
Zamalek	2019–20	Egyptian Premier League	1	0	0	0	0	0	0	0	1	0
Career total			1	0	0	0	0	0	0	0	1	0
