= Nasser Mansi =

Egyptian footballer (born 1997)

Personal information
- Full name: Nasser Mansi Desouky Ahmed El Sayed
- Date of birth: 16 November 1997 (age 29)
- Place of birth: Egypt
- Height: 1.83 m (6 ft 0 in)
- Position: Striker

Team information
- Current team: Zamalek
- Number: 9

Youth career
- –2014: El Shams

Senior career*
Years	Team	Apps	(Gls)
2014–2017	El Shams		
2017–2018	El Dakhleya	26	(7)
2018–2022	Pyramids	23	(1)
2019–2021	→ Tala'ea El Gaish (loan)	54	(15)
2022–2023	National Bank of Egypt	34	(10)
2023–	Zamalek	71	(23)

International career
2018–2021	Egypt U23	5	(1)
Medal record
Men's football
Representing Egypt
Africa U-23 Cup of Nations
Winner	Egypt 2019	Egypt U23
- * Club domestic league appearances and goals

Nasser Mansi Desouky Ahmed El Sayed (Arabic: ناصر منسي دسوقي أحمد السيد; born 16 November 1997), is an Egyptian footballer who plays for Egyptian Premier League side Zamalek as a striker.

== Career ==
=== Club career ===
Mansi started his career at El Shams SC and played in the team from 2014 to 2017. He moved to El Dakhleya SC and played for the 2017–18 season, before moving to Pyramids FC in 2018. He played for Tala'ea El Gaish SC for two seasons 2019–2021 on loan from Pyramids FC. He then moved to NBE SC for one season in 2022–23.

In 2023, Mansi signed for the Egyptian Giants Zamalek. He won with his new team the CAF Confederation Cup in 2023–24. In the 2024 CAF Super Cup, he scored the iconic equalizing goal for Zamalek in a 1–1 draw ending with an 4-3 penalty shootout victory over their rivals Al Ahly, to win his first African Super cup and Zamalek's fifth title of the continental championship.

=== International career ===
In November 2019, he was called for the Egypt national under-23 football team to play in the 2019 U-23 Africa Cup of Nations hosted by Egypt. Egypt won their first title by defeating Ivory Coast with a score of 2–1 in the final, marking Mansi's first title for his country. He was also called to play for his country at the 2020 Summer Olympics in Tokyo, where Egypt reached the quarterfinals.

== Honours ==
Zamalek

- Egyptian Premier League: 2025–26
- Egypt Cup: 2024–25
- CAF Confederation Cup: 2023–24
- CAF Super Cup: 2024

Egypt

- Africa U-23 Cup of Nations: 2019
