= Juan Bezerra =

Brazilian footballer

Personal information
- Full name: Juan Alvina Bezerra
- Date of birth: 16 February 2003 (age 23)
- Place of birth: Rio de Janeiro, Brazil
- Height: 1.65 m (5 ft 5 in)
- Position: Winger

Team information
- Current team: Shabab Al Ahli

Youth career
- 2008–2023: Vasco da Gama

Senior career*
Years	Team	Apps	(Gls)
2023	Vasco da Gama	2	(0)
2023–2025	Oleksandriya	37	(9)
2025–2026	Zamalek	35	(7)
2026	Shabab Al Ahli	0	(0)
- * Club domestic league appearances and goals as of 18 September 2026

Juan Alvina Bezerra (born on 16 February 2003), mostly known as Juan Bezerra, is a Brazilian professional footballer who plays as a winger.

== Career ==
Formed in the youth categories of Vasco da Gama, where he played for all age groups, Alvina gained prominence for his good performance in scoring goals in the under-19 and under-20 categories. After a few games for the professional team, he was traded to Ukrainian club Oleksandriya at the end of 2023, where he scored his first goal as a professional, against Veres Rivne.

On 7 August 2025, he signed a four-year contract with Egyptian side Zamalek.

On 19 September 2026, he joined Shabab Al Ahli.

== Honours ==
Vasco da Gama (youth)

- Copa do Brasil Sub-20: 2020
- Supercopa do Brasil Sub-20: 2020
- Campeonato Carioca Sub-20: 2020

Zamalek SC

- Egyptian Premier League: 2026
