= 2025–26 Egyptian Premier League =

Egyptian Premier League
- Season: 2025–26
- Dates: 8 August 2025 – 29 May 2026
- Champions: Zamalek; 15th title
- Relegated: Kahrabaa Ismailia; Haras El Hodoud; Pharco; Ismaily
- CAF Champions League: Zamalek; Pyramids
- CAF Confederation Cup: Al Ahly; ZED
- Goals: 569
- Top goalscorer: Ahmed Yasser Rayyan (13 goals)
- Biggest home win: Al Masry 4–0 Kahrabaa Ismailia
- Biggest away win: Tala'ea El Gaish 0–3 Al Masry
- Highest scoring: Kahrabaa Ismailia 2–5 Zamalek

The 2025–26 Egyptian Premier League season was the 67th edition of the Egyptian Premier League, the top professional league for association football clubs in the Egyptian football league system, since its establishment in 1948.

The championship phase concluded on 20 May 2026, with Zamalek SC securing their 15th league title following a 1–0 victory over Ceramica Cleopatra in the final round. Zamalek clinched the championship after a fierce race with Pyramids FC, finishing at the top of the championship group with 56 points, a two-point margin ahead of Pyramids who finished as runners-up with 54 points. Meanwhile, the relegation phase continues until 27 May to determine the remaining two teams to be relegated alongside Ismaily and Pharco.

== Format ==
On 18 May 2025, the Egyptian Pro League Association announced the cancellation of relegation for the 2024–25 season. Three teams were promoted to the Premier League, increasing the size of the league from 18 to 21 teams.

The league consists of 21 teams in a single group and is played in two phases. In the first phase, teams face each other once in a single-leg tie, after which the league splits into two groups. Phase two features a championship group for the teams finishing first to seventh and a relegation group for teams placed eighth to twenty-first. The first-place team in the championship group is crowned league champion and qualifies for the CAF Champions League alongside the runner-up, while the third-place team qualifies for the CAF Confederation Cup. Four of the teams in the relegation group get relegated to the Egyptian Second Division A at the end of the season.

== Teams ==
Locations of the 2025–26 Egyptian Premier League teams

A total of three teams were promoted to the league from the 2024–25 Egyptian Second Division A. The first team was champions Al Mokawloon Al Arab SC, who secured promotion back to the Egyptian Premier League who reached an immediate return to the league. They were joined by Wadi Degla SC, who returned to the league after a five-year absence by clinching the second promotion spot. Kahraba Ismailia SC were the last team to earn promotion, who got promoted to the league for the first time in their history, after coming third.

All 18 teams from the prior season's Premier League returned for 2025–26.

=== Stadiums and locations ===
Team	Location	Stadium (Note: Main stadiums for the 2024–25 season are listed only. Clubs are allowed to play selected matches at alternative venues; whether due to unavailability, security concerns, or other reasons. For example, Al Ittihad, a team from Alexandria, may play some home games at Borg El Arab Stadium, instead of their regular home stadium, Alexandria Stadium.)	Capacity
Al Ahly	Gezira	Cairo International Stadium	75,000
Al Mokawloon Al Arab SC	Abageyah	Osman Ahmed Osman Stadium	35,000
Ceramica Cleopatra	6th of October	Osman Ahmed Osman Stadium	35,000
ENPPI	New Cairo	Petrosport Stadium	16,000
Ghazl El Mahalla	El Mahalla El Kubra	Ghazl El Mahalla Stadium	14,564
El Gouna	El Gouna	Khaled Bichara Stadium	12,000
Haras El Hodoud	Alexandria	Haras El Hodoud Stadium	22,000
Ismaily	Ismailia (Sheikh Zayed)	Ismailia Stadium	18,525
Kahraba Ismailia SC	Ismailia (Sheikh Zayed)	Kahrabaa Ismailia Stadium	6,000
Al Ittihad	Alexandria	Alexandria Stadium	19,676
Al Masry	Port Said (Al Dawahy)	Suez Stadium	27,000
Modern Sport	Mokattam	Cairo International Stadium	75,000
National Bank of Egypt	Agouza	Cairo International Stadium	75,000
Petrojet	Suez (Faisal)	Cairo Military Academy Stadium	28,500
Pharco	Alexandria	Haras El Hodoud Stadium	22,000
Pyramids	New Cairo	30 June Stadium	30,000
Smouha	Alexandria	Borg El Arab Stadium	86,000
Tala'ea El Gaish	Al Waili	Gehaz El Reyada Stadium	20,000
Wadi Degla SC	Zahraa El Maadi	Petrosport Stadium	16,000
Zamalek	Mit Okba	Cairo International Stadium	75,000
ZED	Sheikh Zayed City	Cairo International Stadium	75,000

=== Managerial changes ===
Team	Outgoing manager	Manner of departure	Date of vacancy	Position in table	Incoming manager	Date of appointment
National Bank	(Egypt) Tariq Mustafa	Dismissed	31 August 2025	16th	(Egypt) Ayman Remady	31 August 2025
Al Ahly	(Spain) José Riveiro	Mutual Consent	31 August 2025	12th	(Egypt) Emad El Nahhas	3 September 2025
El Ittihad Alexandria	(Egypt) Ahmed Samy	Contract Termination	19 September 2025	17th	(Egypt) Tamer Mustafa	20 September 2025
Al Mokawloon	(Egypt) Mohamed Maki	Resignation	28 September 2025	19th	(Egypt) Samy Qumsan	5 October 2025
Al Ahly	(Egypt) Emad El Nahhas	End of Caretaker spell	8 October 2025	1st	(Denmark) Jess Thorup	8 October 2025
Haras El Hodoud	(Egypt) Abdel Hamid Bassiouny	Mutual Consent	15 October 2025	15th	(Egypt) Ahmed Zahran	21 October 2025
Al Zamalek	(Belgium) Yannick Ferrera	Dismissed	1 November 2025	4th	(Egypt) Ahmed Abdel Raouf	1 November 2025
Tala'ea El Geish	(Egypt) Haitham Shaaban	Mutual Consent	6 November 2025	19th	(Egypt) Gamah Mashhoor	6 November 2025
Modern Sport	(Egypt) Magdy Abdelaaty	Mutual Consent	25 December 2025	12th	(Egypt) Ahmed Samy	26 December 2025
Al Zamalek	(Egypt) Ahmed Abdel Raouf	End of Care taker spell	31 December 2025	5th	(Egypt) Tamer Abdel Hamid	31 December 2025
Al Zamalek	(Egypt) Tamer Abdel Hamid	End of Care taker spell	7 January 2026	5th	(Egypt) Motamed Gamal	7 January 2026
Al Ismaily	(Algeria) Miloud Hamdi	Mutual Consent	24 January 2026	20th	(Egypt) Tarek El Ashry	24 January 2026
Haras El Hodoud	(Egypt) Ahmed Zahran	End of Care taker spell	24 January 2026	16th	(Egypt) Haitham Shaaban	24 January 2026
Al Ismaily	(Egypt) Tarek El Ashry	Mutual Consent	1 March 2026	21st	(Egypt) Khaled Galal	3 March 2026
Pharco	(Egypt) Ahmed Khattab	Resignation	4 March 2026	20th	(Egypt) Tarek El Ashry	4 March 2026
El Masry	(Egypt) Nabil Kouki	Dismissal	7 April 2026	5th	(Egypt) Emad El Nahhas	7 April 2026
Al Ittihad Alexandria	(Egypt) Tamer Moustafa	Contract Termination	10 April 2026	17th	(Egypt) Miloud Hamdi	11 April 2026

== Regular season ==
Pos	Team	Pld	W	D	L	GF	GA	GD	Pts	Qualification
1	Zamalek	20	13	4	3	32	13	+19	43	Qualification for the championship play-offs
2	Pyramids	20	13	4	3	33	15	+18	43	Qualification for the championship play-offs
3	Al Ahly	20	11	7	2	33	19	+14	40	Qualification for the championship play-offs
4	Ceramica Cleopatra	20	11	5	4	29	16	+13	38	Qualification for the championship play-offs
5	Al Masry	20	8	8	4	29	20	+9	32	Qualification for the championship play-offs
6	Smouha	20	8	7	5	21	13	+8	31	Qualification for the championship play-offs
7	ENPPI	20	7	9	4	20	16	+4	30	Qualification for the championship play-offs
8	ZED	20	7	8	5	21	16	+5	29	Qualification for the relegation play-offs
9	Wadi Degla	20	7	8	5	23	20	+3	29	Qualification for the relegation play-offs
10	El Gouna	20	6	10	4	16	15	+1	28	Qualification for the relegation play-offs
11	National Bank of Egypt	20	5	11	4	18	14	+4	26	Qualification for the relegation play-offs
12	Petrojet	20	5	10	5	21	23	−2	25	Qualification for the relegation play-offs
13	Modern Sport	20	5	8	7	18	24	−6	23	Qualification for the relegation play-offs
14	Tala'ea El Gaish	20	5	7	8	14	24	−10	22	Qualification for the relegation play-offs
15	Al Ittihad	20	6	2	12	15	24	−9	20	Qualification for the relegation play-offs
16	Ghazl El Mahalla	20	2	13	5	12	15	−3	19	Qualification for the relegation play-offs
17	Al Mokawloon Al Arab	20	3	9	8	13	21	−8	18	Qualification for the relegation play-offs
18	Haras El Hodoud	20	4	5	11	15	29	−14	17	Qualification for the relegation play-offs
19	Kahrabaa Ismailia	20	4	4	12	22	37	−15	16	Qualification for the relegation play-offs
20	Pharco	20	2	9	9	8	22	−14	15	Qualification for the relegation play-offs
21	Ismaily	20	3	2	15	11	28	−17	11	Qualification for the relegation play-offs

Source: Soccerway (regular season)
Rules for classification: 1) Points; 2) Goal difference; 3) Goals scored.

== Regular season results ==
Home \ Away	AHL	CER	ENP	GMH	GOU	HRS	ISM	ITH	KIS	MAS	MOD	MOK	NBE	PET	PHA	PYR	SMO	TGS	WDG	ZAM	ZED
Al Ahly		1–0	1–1	0–0	1–0	3–2	2–0	2–1	4–2	0–0	2–2	3–1	1–1	1–1	4–1	0–2	1–0	1–2	3–1	2–1	1–1
Ceramica Cleopatra	0–1		2–0	3–2	1–1	3–0	1–1	3–1	1–0	2–3	2–0	1–0	2–2	2–1	2–0	0–1	1–0	2–0	1–1	0–2	0–0
ENPPI	1–1	0–2		0–0	0–0	0–1	1–0	3–0	2–1	3–2	2–2	1–1	0–0	1–1	0–0	1–2	1–2	1–1	1–0	1–0	1–0
Ghazl El Mahalla	0–0	2–3	0–0		0–0	0–0	3–0	0–2	1–0	1–2	0–0	1–1	0–0	0–0	0–0	1–3	0–0	0–0	2–3	1–1	0–0
El Gouna	0–1	1–1	0–0	0–0		1–2	2–1	2–0	1–0	1–0	1–1	1–1	0–3	1–1	0–1	1–1	1–0	1–0	0–0	1–1	1–1
Haras El Hodoud	2–3	0–3	1–0	0–0	2–1		1–3	0–2	1–2	1–1	0–1	0–0	1–0	1–3	2–2	1–3	0–1	0–1	1–1	0–2	1–0
Ismaily	0–2	1–1	0–1	0–3	1–2	3–1		0–1	2–1	0–2	0–1	1–2	1–2	0–0	0–1	0–1	0–2	1–0	1–2	0–2	0–1
Al Ittihad	1–2	1–3	0–3	2–0	0–2	2–0	1–0		0–1	1–3	1–2	2–1	0–0	0–1	0–0	1–2	1–0	1–0	1–2	0–1	0–1
Kahrabaa Ismailia	2–4	0–1	1–2	0–1	0–1	2–1	1–2	1–0		0–4	1–1	1–0	1–1	2–2	2–0	1–2	1–2	2–2	1–4	2–5	1–2
Al Masry	0–0	3–2	2–3	2–1	0–1	1–1	2–0	3–1	4–0		1–0	1–1	1–0	2–3	0–0	2–2	0–0	3–0	1–1	0–3	1–1
Modern Sport	2–2	0–2	2–2	0–0	1–1	1–0	1–0	2–1	1–1	0–1		1–2	0–0	1–1	1–1	2–1	0–3	0–1	2–1	1–2	0–2
Al Mokawloon Al Arab	1–3	0–1	1–1	1–1	1–1	0–0	2–1	1–2	0–1	1–1	2–1		0–1	0–1	1–1	0–2	1–1	0–0	1–0	0–0	0–2
National Bank of Egypt	1–1	2–2	0–0	0–0	3–0	0–1	2–1	0–0	1–1	0–1	0–0	1–0		3–0	1–0	0–1	1–3	0–0	1–1	1–1	1–1
Petrojet	1–1	1–2	1–1	0–0	1–1	3–1	0–0	1–0	2–2	3–2	1–1	1–0	0–3		1–1	2–2	0–0	1–2	1–0	0–2	1–2
Pharco	1–4	0–2	0–0	0–0	1–0	2–2	1–0	0–0	0–2	0–0	1–1	1–1	0–1	1–1		0–2	0–2	0–1	0–0	0–1	0–2
Pyramids	2–0	1–0	2–1	3–1	1–1	3–1	1–0	2–1	2–1	2–2	1–2	2–0	1–0	2–2	2–0		1–2	4–0	0–0	0–1	1–0
Smouha	0–1	0–1	2–1	0–0	0–1	1–0	2–0	0–1	2–1	0–0	3–0	1–1	3–1	0–0	2–0	2–1		1–1	1–1	0–1	1–1
Tala'ea El Gaish	2–1	0–2	1–1	0–0	0–1	1–0	0–1	0–1	2–2	0–3	1–0	0–0	0–0	2–1	1–0	0–4	1–1		0–1	1–3	2–2
Wadi Degla	1–3	1–1	0–1	3–2	0–0	1–1	2–1	2–1	4–1	1–1	1–2	0–1	1–1	0–1	0–0	0–0	1–1	1–0		2–1	2–1
Zamalek	1–2	2–0	0–1	1–1	1–1	2–0	2–0	1–0	5–2	3–0	2–1	0–0	1–1	2–0	1–0	1–0	1–0	3–1	1–2		2–1
ZED	1–1	0–0	0–1	0–0	1–1	0–1	1–0	1–0	2–1	1–1	2–0	2–0	1–1	2–1	2–0	0–1	1–1	2–2	1–2	1–2	

Updated to match(es) played on 9 March 2026. Source: Soccerway
Legend: Blue = home team win; Yellow = draw; Red = away team win.
For upcoming matches, an "a" indicates there is an article about the rivalry between the two participants.

== Championship play-offs ==
Pos	Team	Pld	W	D	L	GF	GA	GD	Pts	Qualification
1	Zamalek (C)	6	4	1	1	7	4	+3	56	Qualification for the Champions League first or second round
2	Pyramids	6	3	2	1	10	6	+4	54	Qualification for the Champions League first or second round
3	Al Ahly	6	4	1	1	11	5	+6	53	Qualification for the Confederation Cup first or second round
4	Ceramica Cleopatra	6	1	3	2	5	5	0	44	
5	Al Masry	6	2	2	2	6	9	−3	40	
6	ENPPI	6	1	3	2	7	9	−2	36	
7	Smouha	6	0	0	6	2	10	−8	31	

Updated to match(es) played on 20 May 2026. Source: Soccerway (championship round)
Rules for classification: 1) Points; 2) Head to Head; 3) Goals scored; 4) Play-off tie.
(Note: Clubs qualified for this phase with the full regular season points they got, but without goals for or against)
(C) Champions

== Championship round results ==
Home \ Away	AHL	CER	ENP	MAS	PYR	SMO	ZAM
Al Ahly		1–1	3–0	2–0	0–3	2–1	3–0
Ceramica Cleopatra	1–1		1–1	0–1	1–1	2–0	0–1
ENPPI	0–3	1–1		2–2	2–3	2–0	0–0
Al Masry	0–2	1–0	2–2		1–1	1–0	1–4
Pyramids	3–0	1–1	3–2	1–1		2–1	0–1
Smouha	1–2	0–2	0–2	0–1	1–2		0–1
Zamalek	0–3	1–0	0–0	4–1	1–0	1–0	

Updated to match(es) played on 20 May 2026. Source: Soccerway
Legend: Blue = home team win; Yellow = draw; Red = away team win.
For upcoming matches, an "a" indicates there is an article about the rivalry between the two participants.

== Positions by round ==
Positions are listed after each completed round. Rounds 1–21 represent the regular season; rounds 22–28 represent the championship stage. Source: Soccerway.

Top four positions by round
Team ╲ Round	1	2	3	4	5	6	7	8	9	10	11	12	13	14	15	16	17	18	19	20	21	22	23	24	25	26	27	28
Zamalek	2	3	2	1	2	1	1	1	2	3	5	5	4	4	4	4	2	4	2	1	1	1	1	1	1	1	1	1
Pyramids	9	6	4	10	5	4	4	4	1	1	1	1	1	1	1	1	3	2	1	2	2	2	2	2	2	2	2	2
Al Ahly	5	2	6	6	13	10	10	7	4	4	2	3	3	3	3	3	4	3	4	3	3	3	3	3	3	3	3	3
Ceramica Cleopatra	20	17	10	12	9	8	8	6	5	5	3	2	2	2	2	2	1	1	3	4	4	4	4	4	4	4	4	4

Updated to match(es) played on 20 May 2026. Source: Soccerway

== Relegation play-offs ==
Pos	Team	Pld	W	D	L	GF	GA	GD	Pts	Qualification or relegation
1	Wadi Degla	13	6	6	1	42	29	+13	53	
2	ZED	13	5	5	3	39	31	+8	49	Qualification for the Confederation Cup first or second round (Note: ZED FC qualified for the CAF Confederation Cup by reaching the final of the 2025–26 Egypt Cup, with Pyramids FC as the other finalist, having finished among the top three in the league.)
3	National Bank of Egypt	13	6	4	3	38	30	+8	48	
4	El Gouna	13	4	6	3	26	24	+2	46	
5	Petrojet	13	5	5	3	39	38	+1	45	
6	Ghazl El Mahalla	13	4	7	2	27	26	+1	38	
7	Al Mokawloon Al Arab	13	4	8	1	28	31	−3	38	
8	Modern Sport	13	2	8	3	26	34	−8	37	
9	Tala'ea El Gaish	13	4	3	6	21	34	−13	37	
10	Al Ittihad	13	3	7	3	29	38	−9	36	
11	Kahrabaa Ismailia (R)	13	3	7	3	35	53	−18	32	Relegation to Second Division A
12	Haras El Hodoud (R)	13	1	6	6	26	48	−22	26	Relegation to Second Division A
13	Pharco (R)	13	2	4	7	15	35	−20	25	Relegation to Second Division A
14	Ismaily (R)	13	1	6	6	15	40	−25	20	Relegation to Second Division A

Updated to match(es) played on 29 May 2026. Source: Soccerway (relegation round)
Rules for classification: 1) Points; 2) Goal difference; 3) Goals scored; 4) Play-off tie.
(Note: Clubs qualified for this phase with the full regular season points they got, but without goals for or against)
(R) Relegated

== Relegation round results ==
Home \ Away	GMH	GOU	HRS	ISM	ITH	KAH	MOD	MOK	NBE	PET	PHA	TGS	WAD	ZED
Ghazl El Mahalla		1–0	4–2	0–0	1–0	3–1	0–0	1–1	1–1	1–1	1–1	0–1	0–0	2–3
El Gouna	0–1		1–1	1–0	0–0	0–1	0–0	0–1	1–1	2–1	1–0	2–1	0–0	2–2
Haras El Hodoud	2–4	1–1		0–0	2–2	2–0	0–0	1–3	2–4	0–3	1–2	0–0	0–1	1–2
Ismaily	0–0	0–1	0–0		0–3	1–1	0–2	0–1	0–0	1–0	1–2	0–0	1–2	0–0
Al Ittihad	0–1	0–0	2–2	3–0		1–1	0–0	0–0	2–2	1–2	1–1	1–0	1–4	2–1
Kahrabaa Ismailia	1–3	1–0	0–2	1–1	1–1		1–1	2–2	1–3	0–0	0–0	2–1	2–1	1–1
Modern Sport	0–0	0–0	0–0	2–0	0–0	1–1		1–3	1–2	1–1	1–0	0–0	0–0	1–3
Al Mokawloon Al Arab	1–1	1–0	0–0	1–0	0–0	2–2	3–1		1–2	2–2	1–1	2–0	1–1	0–0
National Bank of Egypt	1–1	1–1	4–2	0–0	2–2	3–1	2–1	2–1		2–3	1–0	0–1	0–2	2–1
Petrojet	1–1	1–2	3–0	0–1	2–1	0–0	1–1	2–2	3–2		1–0	0–2	2–2	2–1
Pharco	1–1	0–1	2–1	2–1	1–1	0–0	0–1	1–1	0–1	0–1		0–1	0–2	0–1
Tala'ea El Gaish	1–0	1–2	0–0	0–0	0–1	1–2	0–0	0–2	1–0	2–0	1–0		0–2	0–1
Wadi Degla	0–0	0–0	1–0	2–1	4–1	1–2	0–0	1–1	2–0	2–2	2–0	2–0		2–2
ZED	3–2	2–2	2–1	0–0	1–2	1–1	3–1	0–0	1–2	1–2	1–0	1–0	2–2	

Updated to match(es) played on 29 May 2026. Source: Soccerway
Legend: Blue = home team win; Yellow = draw; Red = away team win.

== Number of teams by governorate ==
Number of teams	Governorate	Team(s)
7	Cairo	Al Ahly, Al Mokawloon Al Arab, ENPPI, Modern Sport, Pyramids, Tala'ea El Gaish and Wadi Degla
4	Alexandria	Haras El Hodoud, Al Ittihad, Pharco and Smouha
4	Giza	Ceramica Cleopatra, National Bank of Egypt, Zamalek and ZED
2	Ismailia	Ismaily and Kahrabaa Ismailia
1	Gharbia	Ghazl El Mahalla
1	Port Said	Al Masry
1	Red Sea	El Gouna
1	Suez	Petrojet

== Statistics ==
=== Top scorers ===
Rank	Player	Club	Goals
1	(Egypt) Ahmed Yasser Rayyan	National Bank of Egypt	11
2	(Eritrea) Ali Sulieman	Kahrabaa Ismailia	9
2	(Egypt) Mahmoud Trézéguet	Al Ahly	9
4	(Egypt) Osama Faisal	National Bank of Egypt	8
4	(Palestine) Oday Dabbagh	Zamalek	8
4	(Ivory Coast) Franck Boli	Wadi Degla	8
7	(Egypt) Salah Mohsen	Al Masry	7
7	(Nigeria) Sodiq Ougola	Ceramica Cleopatra	7
9	(Egypt) Adham Hamed	Petrojet	6
9	(Egypt) Mohamed Hamdy Zaki	Haras El Hodoud	6
9	(Egypt) Mostafa Ziko	Pyramids	6
9	(Egypt) Omar El Saeey	Al Masry	6
9	(Egypt) Nasser Mansi	Zamalek	6
9	(The Gambia) Fagrie Lakay	Ceramica Cleopatra	6

=== Discipline ===
==== Player ====
- Most yellow cards: 9
  - Ahmed Samy
  - Abderrahim Deghmoum
- Most red cards: 3
  - Karim El Deeb

==== Club ====
- Most yellow cards: 68
  - Haras El Hodoud
- Fewest yellow cards: 44
  - Al Ahly
- Most red cards: 7
  - Al Mokawloon Al Arab
- Fewest red cards: 1
  - ENPPI
  - National Bank of Egypt
  - ZED

== See also ==
- 2025–26 Egyptian Second Division A
- 2025–26 Egyptian Second Division B
- 2025–26 Egypt Cup
