= 2024 Egypt Cup final =

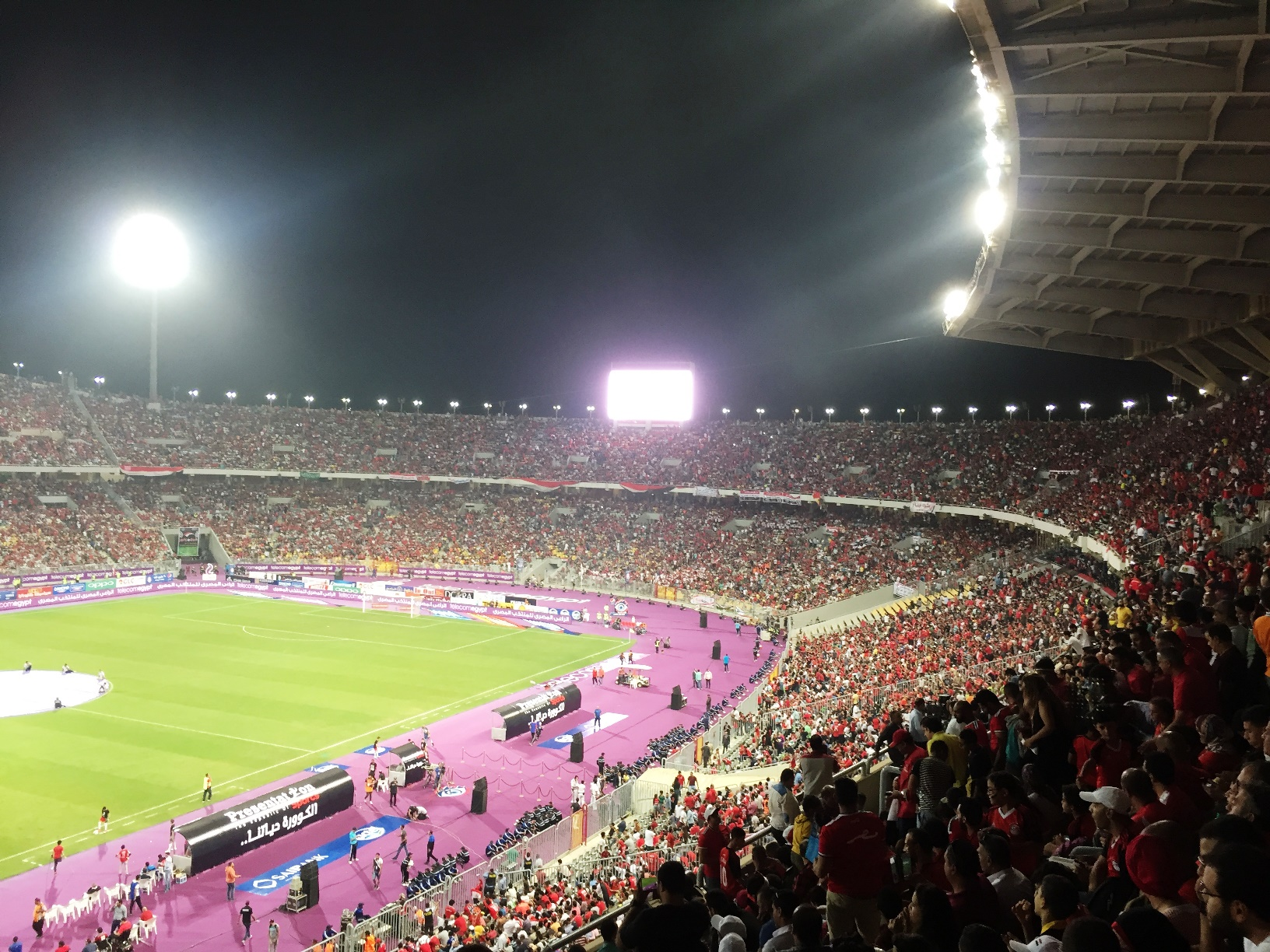
- Borg El Arab Stadium hosted the match
Pyramids	ZED
1	0
- Date: 30 August 2024
- Venue: Borg El Arab Stadium, Alexandria
- Man of the Match: Fiston Mayele (Pyramids)
- Referee: Ahmed El Ghandour
- Weather: Fair; 27 °C (81 °F); 70% humidity

The 2024 Egypt Cup final was the final match of the 2023–24 Egypt Cup, the 92nd edition of the competition since its establishment in 1921. It was played between Pyramids and ZED on 30 August 2024 at Borg El Arab Stadium in Alexandria.

Both teams were looking to win their first ever Egypt Cup title. This marked Pyramids' third appearance in the final match of the competition, having previously lost the 2019 and 2022 finals against Zamalek and Al Ahly, respectively. ZED on the other hand played the final of a major tournament for the first time in their history.

Fiston Mayele's late strike earned Pyramids a 1–0 victory, winning his club their first-ever Egypt Cup and major title.

== Route to the final ==
=== Pyramids ===
Round	Opposition	Score
R32	Al Nasr	4–0
R16	Abou Qir Fertilizers	1–0
QF	El Gouna	4–0
SF	Al Masry	1–1 (4–3 p.)

As an Egyptian Premier League team, Pyramids entered the competition in the round of 32, and were drawn at home against Al Nasr. Pyramids won the match 4–0, courtesy of goals from Youssef Osama and a hat-trick by Marwan Hamdy. In the round of 16, they played against Abou Qir Fertilizers at home, and grabbed a win by a single goal also scored by Marwan Hamdy. In the quarter-finals, Pyramids faced El Gouna at home, and earned a 4–0 victory thanks to goals from Fiston Mayele, Ahmed Samy, Blati Touré and Mostafa Fathi. In the semi-finals, they faced Al Masry away from home for the first time in the competition this season, who eliminated them from the Egyptian League Cup quarter-finals earlier this season. Pyramids managed to get their revenge as they won the tie 4–3 on penalties, after the original and extra time ended 1–1, with Fagrie Lakay scoring Pyramids' only goal, to secure the club's place in the Egypt Cup final for the third time in their history.

=== ZED ===
Round	Opposition	Score
R32	El Dakhleya	2–1 (a.e.t.)
R16	Ceramica Cleopatra	3–0 (a.e.t.)
QF	Modern Future	1–0 (a.e.t.)
SF	Ismaily	1–0

ZED also entered the competition in the round of 32, as an Egyptian Premier League side, and were drawn at home against fellow Egyptian Premier League side El Dakhleya. They won the match 2–1 at extra time thanks to a stoppage time equalizer from Mostafa Ziko and a late goal from Shady Hussein. In the round of 16, the club was drawn against Egyptian League Cup champions Ceramica Cleopatra away from home, and succeeded in winning the match 3–0, again after extra time, with goals from Dilson (2) and Abdel Rahman El Banouby. In the quarter-finals, the club faced Modern Future away from home, and managed to advance to the semi-finals after winning 1–0, again after extra time, with Mohamed Ismail scoring the club's only goal. In the semi-finals, ZED were drawn away from home in the competition for the third consecutive time against Ismaily, and managed to grab a 1–0 win thanks to Dilson's early first half goal; sending the club to their first-ever Egypt Cup and major competition final match.

== Venue ==
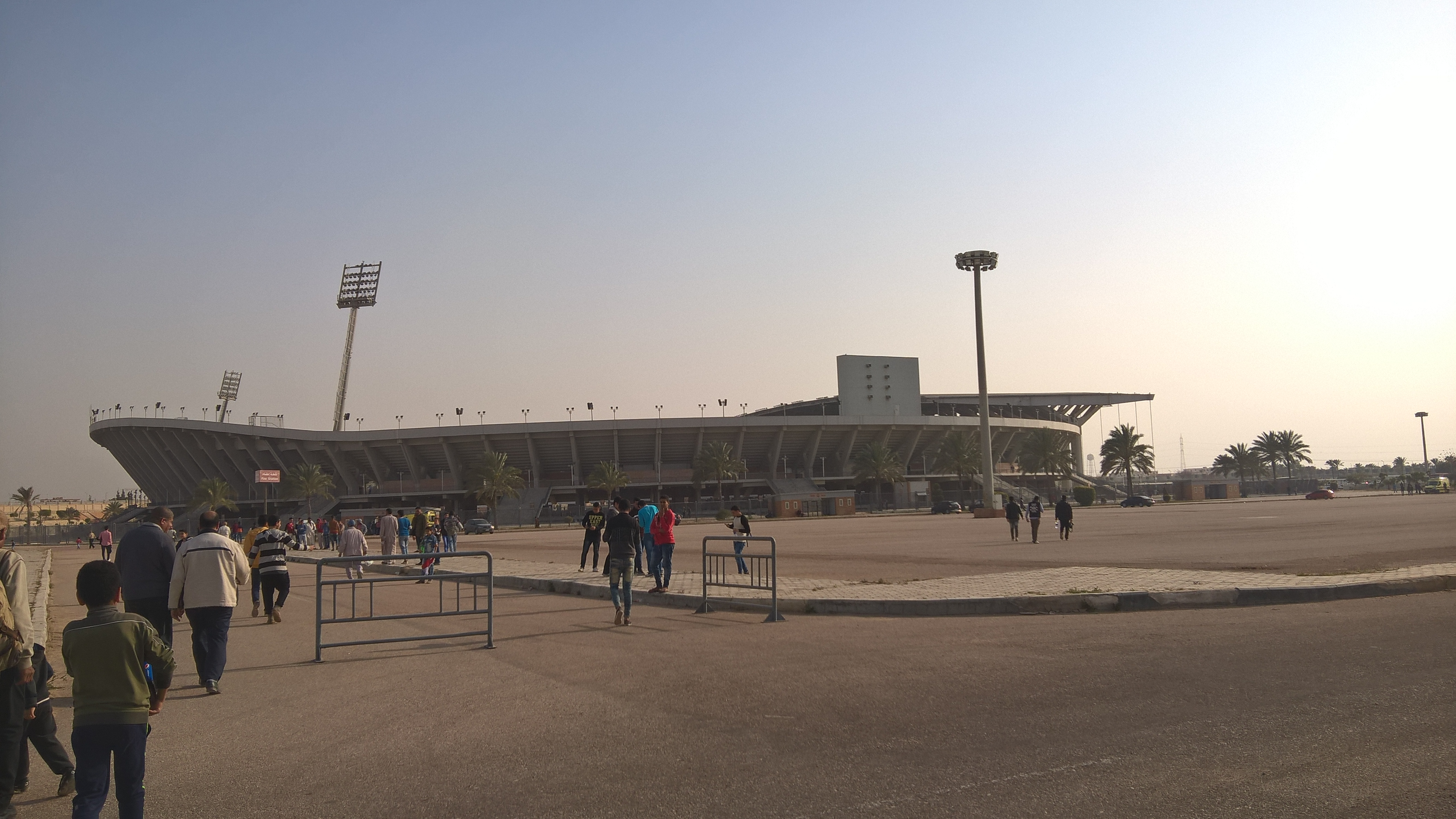
Exterior view of the stadium in 2017.

Borg El Arab Stadium was selected on 14 August 2024 by the Egyptian Football Association to host the final.

The stadium was opened in 2009, and has since been one of the home venues of the Egypt national football team. It was one of the venues of the 2009 FIFA U-20 World Cup, and was included in Egypt's bid to host the 2010 FIFA World Cup. It hosted the CAF Champions League final on four occasions, most recently in 2018, when it hosted the first leg between Al Ahly and Espérance de Tunis.

Domestically, the stadium hosts all matches involving Al Masry, due to security concerns since the Port Said Stadium riot occurred in 2012, and due to their home stadium being under construction, alongside selected matches in the Egyptian Premier League. The 2023 Egyptian League Cup final was played on the stadiums, alongside three editions of the Egyptian Super Cup, most recently in 2021.

The finals of five consecutive editions of the Egypt Cup were previously held at Borg El Arab Stadium between 2016 and 2020.

== Officials ==
The match officials for the final were announced by the Egyptian Football Association on 28 August 2024. Ahmed El Ghandour was selected as the main official, with Mahmoud Abou El Regal and Samir Gamal as the assistant referees, Mahmoud Nagy as the fourth official, and Sherif Abdallah as the reserve assistant referee. Mahmoud Bassiouny was selected as the video assistant referee, and Mohamed Youssef and Osama El Sayed were selected as the assistant video assistant referee and the support video assistant referee, respectively.

== Match ==
=== Details ===
30 August 2024
21:00 CAST

Pyramids	1–0	ZED
Mayele 87'	Report

Borg El Arab Stadium, Alexandria
Referee: Ahmed El Ghandour

Pyramids	ZED

GK	1	(Egypt) Ahmed El Shenawy (c)
RB	15	(Morocco) Mohamed Chibi	(yellow card) 41'	(substituted off) 90'
CB	4	(Egypt) Ahmed Samy
CB	21	(Egypt) Mohamed Hamdy
LB	29	(Egypt) Karim Hafez	(yellow card) 90+6'	(substituted off) 90+6'
CM	7	(Burkina Faso) Blati Touré
CM	14	(Egypt) Mohanad Lasheen
AM	18	(Morocco) Walid El Karti
RW	11	(Egypt) Mostafa Fathi		(substituted off) 90+2'
LW	23	(South Africa) Fagrie Lakay		(substituted off) 46'
CF	9	(Democratic Republic of the Congo) Fiston Mayele		(substituted off) 90+6'
Substitutes:
GK	28	(Egypt) Ahmed Mayhoub
DF	12	(Egypt) Ahmed Tawfik		(substituted on) 90+2'
DF	24	(Egypt) Ahmed Fathy		(substituted on) 90+6'
MF	8	(Egypt) Islam Issa		(substituted on) 90'
MF	17	(Egypt) Mohamed Reda II
MF	19	(Egypt) Mahmoud Saber
MF	20	(Egypt) Mahmoud Zalaka		(substituted on) 46'
FW	26	(Egypt) Mohamed El Gabbas
FW	33	(Egypt) Marwan Hamdy		(substituted on) 90+6'
Manager:
(Croatia) Krunoslav Jurčić

GK	1	(Egypt) Ali Lotfi (c)
RB	8	(Egypt) Ahmed Abdel Naby
CB	24	(Egypt) Mohamed Ismail
CB	12	(Egypt) Mostafa El Aash
LB	21	(Egypt) Mohamed Ashraf
CM	7	(Egypt) Ahmed Atef	(yellow card) 53'
CM	26	(Democratic Republic of the Congo) Peter Zilu Mutumosi
CM	37	(Mauritania) Maata Magassa
RW	10	(Egypt) Mostafa Ziko	(yellow card) 73'
LW	17	(Egypt) Abdel Rahman El Banouby
CF	9	(Egypt) Shady Hussein
Substitutes:
GK	16	(Egypt) Amr Hossam
DF	2	(Egypt) Mohamed Reda I
DF	3	(Egypt) Mostafa Kajo
DF	6	(Egypt) Islam Abdallah
MF	11	(Egypt) Abdallah Magdy		(substituted on) 82'
MF	18	(Egypt) Ahmed El Saghiri		(substituted on) 82'
FW	13	(Angola) Dilson		(substituted on) 69'
FW	23	(Egypt) Mostafa Saad		(substituted on) 68'
FW	27	(Nigeria) Rasheed Ahmed		(substituted on) 89'
Manager:
(Egypt) Magdy Abdel Aati

Man of the Match:
Fiston Mayele (Pyramids)

Assistant referees:
Mahmoud Abou El Regal
Samir Gamal
Fourth official:
Mahmoud Nagy
Reserve assistant referee:
Sherif Abdallah
Video assistant referee:
Mahmoud Bassiouny
Assistant video assistant referee:
Mohamed Youssef
Support video assistant referee:
Osama El Sayed

Match rules

- 90 minutes
- 30 minutes of extra time if necessary
- Penalty shoot-out if scores still level
- Nine named substitutes
- Maximum of five substitutions, with a sixth allowed in extra time (Note: Each team was given only three opportunities to make substitutions, with a fourth opportunity in extra time, excluding substitutions made at half-time, before the start of extra time and at half-time in extra time.)

=== Statistics ===
First half
Statistic	Pyramids	ZED
Goals scored	0	0
Total shots	5	6
Shots on target	0	1
Ball possession	68%	32%
Corner kicks	1	3
Fouls committed	10	4
Offsides	1	1
Yellow cards	1	0
Red cards	0	0

Second half
Statistic	Pyramids	ZED
Goals scored	1	0
Total shots	11	1
Shots on target	6	0
Ball possession	64%	36%
Corner kicks	4	0
Fouls committed	5	16
Offsides	2	0
Yellow cards	0	2
Red cards	0	0

Overall
Statistic	Pyramids	ZED
Goals scored	1	0
Total shots	16	7
Shots on target	6	1
Ball possession	66%	34%
Corner kicks	5	3
Fouls committed	15	20
Offsides	3	1
Yellow cards	1	2
Red cards	0	0
