= 2023–24 ZED FC season =

ZED FC
2023–24 season
- Manager: Magdy Abdel Aaty
- Stadium: Cairo International Stadium
- Egyptian Premier League: 7th
- Egypt Cup: Runners-up
- Egyptian League Cup: Group stage
- Top goalscorer: League: Mostafa Zico (12); All: Mostafa Zico (13)

The 2023–24 ZED FC season was the club's 15th season in existence and the first season back in the top flight of Egyptian football. In addition to the domestic league, ZED participated in this season's editions of the Egypt Cup, and the League Cup.

== Players ==
=== First-team squad ===
As of 18 September 2023

Note: Flags indicate national team as defined under FIFA eligibility rules; some limited exceptions apply. Players may hold more than one non-FIFA nationality.

No.	Pos.	Nation	Player
—	GK	EGY	Amr Hossam
—	GK	EGY	Ali Lotfi
—	GK	EGY	Mostafa Mahmoud
—	GK	EGY	Mostafa Mohamed
—	DF	EGY	Ahmed Sayed Abdel Nabi
—	DF	EGY	Mohamed Ashraf
—	DF	EGY	Ali Gamal
—	DF	EGY	Mohamed Ismail
—	DF	EGY	Mostafa El Aash
—	DF	EGY	Mohamed Samir
—	DF	EGY	Karim Yakan
—	MF	EGY	Fahd Abu Al-Futouh
—	MF	EGY	Walid Adel
—	MF	EGY	Mahmoud Saber
—	MF	EGY	Girgis Magdy
—	MF	EGY	Raafat Khalil

No.	Pos.	Nation	Player
—	MF	EGY	Mohamed Ali
—	MF	EGY	Nader Ramadan
—	MF	EGY	Haggag Owais
—	MF	EGY	Ahmed Refaat
—	MF	COD	Peter Zilu Mutumosi
—	MF	EGY	Abdallah Magdy
—	MF	EGY	Ahmed Atef
—	MF	EGY	Mostafa Saad
—	FW	EGY	Mostafa Fawzi
—	FW	EGY	Shady Hussein
—	FW	ANG	Leonardo Bartolomeu Kamone
—	FW	TAN	Muhsini Malima
—		EGY	Mohamed Reda Jumaa
—		EGY	Mohamed Sayed
—		EGY	Islam Ismail

== Transfers ==
=== In ===
Pos.	Player	Transferred from	Fee	Date	Source
FW	(Egypt) Mostafa Fawzy	(Egypt) Al Ahly	Undisclosed	27 July 2023	
MF	(Egypt) Mostafa Saad	(Egypt) Al Ahly	Undisclosed	27 July 2023	
GK	(Egypt) Ali Lotfi	(Egypt) Al Ahly	Undisclosed	28 July 2023	
DF	(Egypt) Mohamed Ismail	(Egypt) ENPPI		12 August 2023	
MF	(Egypt) Abdallah Magdy	(Egypt) Pyramids	Loan	14 August 2023	
DF	(Egypt) Mohamed Ashraf	(Egypt) Al Ahly	Loan	15 August 2023	
FW	(Egypt) Shady Hussein	(Egypt) Al Ahly	Undisclosed	20 August 2023	
MF	(Egypt) Mahmoud Saber	(Egypt) Pyramids	Loan	12 September 2023	
MF	(Egypt) Raafat Khalil	(Egypt) Al Ahly	Loan	14 September 2023	

=== Out ===
Pos.	Player	Transferred to	Fee	Date	Source

== Pre-season and friendlies ==
Win Draw Loss

23 March 2024 Friendly	Zamalek (Egypt)	2–2	(Egypt) ZED	Cairo
21:30 UTC+2				Stadium: Petrosport Stadium

== Competitions ==
=== Overall record ===
Competition	First match	Last match	Starting round	Final position	Record							
Competition	First match	Last match	Starting round	Final position	Pld	W	D	L	GF	GA	GD	Win %
Egyptian Premier League	19 September 2023	18 August 2024	Matchday 1	7th	34	13	12	9	48	35	+13	38.24
2023–24 Egypt Cup	28 May 2024	30 August 2024	Round of 32	Runner-up	5	4	0	1	7	2	+5	80.00
Egyptian League Cup	9 January 2024	26 January 2024	Group stage	Group stage	3	1	0	2	3	4	−1	33.33
Total					42	18	12	12	58	41	+17	42.86

Source: Competitions

=== Egyptian Premier League ===
==== League table ====
Pos	Team	Pld	W	D	L	GF	GA	GD	Pts
5	Modern Future	34	14	12	8	40	28	+12	54 (Note: Head-to-head points: Modern Future 4, Smouha 1.)
6	Smouha	34	15	9	10	39	35	+4	54
7	ZED	34	13	12	9	48	35	+13	51
8	Ceramica Cleopatra	34	12	10	12	51	42	+9	46
9	ENPPI	34	11	12	11	38	37	+1	45

Source: Soccerway
Rules for classification: 1) Points; 2) Head-to-head points; 3) Head-to-head goal difference; 4) Goal difference; 5) Goals scored; 6) Play-off tie.
(Note: Head-to-head records are used for final standings only)

==== Results summary ====
Overall								Home						Away					
Pld	W	D	L	GF	GA	GD	Pts	W	D	L	GF	GA	GD	W	D	L	GF	GA	GD
34	13	12	9	48	35	+13	51	5	7	5	24	19	+5	8	5	4	24	16	+8

==== Results by round ====
Round	1
Ground	H
Result	W
Position	5

A = Away; H = Home; W = Win; D = Draw; L = Loss; P = Postponed

==== Matches ====
The league fixtures were unveiled on 11 September 2023.

19 September 2023 1	ZED	1–0	Ismaily

27 September 2023 2	El Gouna	0–1	ZED

5 October 2023 3	ZED	3–3	Baladiyat El Mahalla

22 October 2023 4	Al Mokawloon Al Arab	3–3	ZED

28 October 2023 5	ZED	1–1	Smouha

3 November 2023 6	Zamalek	1–2	ZED

30 November 2023 7	Al Ittihad	0–0	ZED

15 December 2023 9	Pharco	1–2	ZED

27 December 2023 10	ZED	3–1	El Dakhleya

30 December 2023 11	Tala'ea El Gaish	1–0	ZED

14 February 2024 12	ZED	0–0	Pyramids

18 February 2024 13	National Bank	1–1	ZED

26 February 2024 14	ZED	0–1	ENPPI

7 March 2024 15	Modern Future	0–0	ZED

12 March 2024 16	ZED	2–2	Al Masry

3 April 2024 17	Ceramica Cleopatra	1–1	ZED

11 April 2024 8	ZED	0–1	Al Ahly

18 April 2024 18	Ismaily	1–2	ZED

22 April 2024 19	ZED	3–0	El Gouna

27 April 2024 20	Baladiyat El Mahalla	0–3	ZED

3 May 2024 21	ZED	0–1	Al Mokawloon Al Arab

9 May 2024 22	Smouha	1–2	ZED

20 May 2024 24	ZED	0–0	Al Ittihad

18 June 2024 26	ZED	2–2	Pharco

24 June 2024 27	El Dakhleya	1–0	ZED

27 June 2024 28	ZED	4–1	Tala'ea El Gaish

6 July 2024 30	ZED	0–1	National Bank

21 July 2024 31	ENPPI	1–4	ZED

31 July 2024 32	ZED	3–2	Modern Sport

4 August 2024 29	Pyramids	2–1	ZED

8 August 2024 23	ZED	0–1	Zamalek

11 August 2024 25	Al Ahly	2–1	ZED

14 August 2024 33	Al Masry	0–1	ZED

18 August 2024 34	ZED	2–2	Ceramica Cleopatra

=== Egypt Cup ===
28 May 2024 Round of 32	ZED	2–1	El Dakhleya

21 August 2024 Round of 16	Ceramica Cleopatra	0–3	ZED

24 August 2024 Quarter-finals	Modern Sport	0–1	ZED

27 August 2024 Semi-finals	Ismaily	0–1	ZED

30 August 2024 Final	Pyramids	1–0	ZED

== Squad statistics ==
=== Top goalscorer ===
Pos.	No.	Player	Egyptian Premier League	Egypt Cup	Egyptian League Cup	Total
FW	10	(Egypt) Mostafa Ziko	12	1	0	13
