= 2024–25 ZED FC season =

ZED
2024–25 season
- Chairman: Naguib Sawiris
- Manager: Magdy Abdel Aaty
- Stadium: Cairo International Stadium
- Egyptian Premier League: 6th
- Egypt Cup: Round of 16
- Egyptian League Cup: Group stage
- Top goalscorer: League: Mostafa Ziko (6); All: Mostafa Ziko (6)
- All statistics correct as of 17 January 2025.

The 2024–25 season is the 16th season in ZED FC's history and the second consecutive season in the Premier League. In addition to the domestic league, ZED is set to compete in the domestic cup, and the Egyptian League Cup.

== Transfers ==
=== In ===
Date	Pos.	Player	From	Fee	Ref.
20 August 2024	MF	(Egypt) Abdelrahman Emad	(Egypt) ENPPI	Free	
12 September 2024	MF	(Egypt) Hamdy Alaa	(Egypt) Zamalek	Undisclosed	
12 September 2024	MF	(Egypt) Maged Hany	(Egypt) Zamalek	Undisclosed	
14 September 2024	DF	(Egypt) Mohamed Ashraf	(Egypt) Al Ahly	Undisclosed	
14 September 2024	MF	(Egypt) Raafat Khalil	(Egypt) Al Ahly	Undisclosed	
3 October 2024	MF	(Egypt) Ahmed Adel	(Egypt) Al Ittihad	Free	

=== Out ===
Date	Pos.	Player	To	Fee	Ref.
1 July 2024	MF	(Egypt) Omar Khedr	(England) Aston Villa		
19 August 2024	DF	(Egypt) Karim Yakan	(Egypt) El Sekka El Hadid	End of contract	
17 September 2024	DF	(Republic of the Congo) Arnauvy Mombouli	(Armenia) FC Noah		
29 September 2024	DF	(Egypt) Mohamed Bazoka	(Libya) Al-Majd		
11 October 2024	FW	(Egypt) Seif Shika	(Egypt) El Gouna	Undisclosed	
16 October 2024	FW	(Egypt) Hazem Mohamed	(Egypt) Haras El Hodoud	Loan	

== Friendlies ==
3 October 2024 Friendly	Al Ittihad (Egypt)	1–1	(Egypt) ZED	Alexandria
				Stadium: Alexandria Stadium

13 October 2024 Friendly	Zamalek (Egypt)	2–3	(Egypt) ZED	Cairo
	Michalak 55'; Mathlouthi 75'	Report	Dilson 3'; Ibrahim 73'; Hussein

17 November 2024 Friendly	ZED (Egypt)	0–2	(Egypt) Ismaily	Cairo
15:00 UTC+2		Report	Farag 8'; Hamdi 90' (pen.)	Stadium: Petrosport Stadium

== Competitions ==
=== Overall record ===
Competition	First match	Last match	Starting round	Final position	Record							
Competition	First match	Last match	Starting round	Final position	Pld	W	D	L	GF	GA	GD	Win %
Egyptian Premier League	31 October 2024	30 May 2025	Matchday 1		8	3	4	1	6	3	+3	37.50
Egypt Cup	2 January 2025	17 January 2025	Round of 32	Round of 16	2	1	0	1	3	2	+1	50.00
Egyptian League Cup	12 December 2024		Group stage		1	0	0	1	1	3	−2	0.00
Total					11	4	4	3	10	8	+2	36.36

Last updated: 17 January 2025
Source: Competitions

=== Egyptian Premier League ===
==== Regular season ====
Pos	Team	Pld	W	D	L	GF	GA	GD	Pts	Qualification or relegation
9	Haras El Hodoud	17	6	4	7	17	19	−2	22	Qualification for the championship play-offs
10	Tala'ea El Gaish	17	5	6	6	13	18	−5	21	Qualification for the relegation play-offs
11	ZED	17	4	9	4	15	13	+2	21	Qualification for the relegation play-offs
12	Smouha	17	6	2	9	13	22	−9	20	Qualification for the relegation play-offs
13	Al Ittihad	17	4	6	7	11	16	−5	18	Qualification for the relegation play-offs

Source: Soccerway (regular season)
Rules for classification: 1) Points; 2) Goal difference; 3) Goals scored.

Pos	Team	Pld	W	D	L	GF	GA	GD	Pts	Qualification
1	Al Ahly (C)	8	6	1	1	22	9	+13	58 (Note: Al Ahly were initially deducted three points for refusing to play their away fixture against Zamalek, scheduled to be played on 11 March 2025. The points deduction was later cancelled by the Egyptian Premier League.)	Qualification for the Champions League first or second round
2	Pyramids	8	4	2	2	15	10	+5	56	Qualification for the Champions League first or second round
3	Zamalek	8	4	3	1	14	6	+8	47	Qualification for the Confederation Cup first or second round
4	Al Masry	8	3	3	2	10	9	+1	42	Qualification for the Confederation Cup first or second round
5	National Bank of Egypt SC	8	2	3	3	13	12	+1	38	
6	Ceramica Cleopatra	8	4	1	3	15	12	+3	37	
7	Pharco	8	2	3	3	8	16	−8	32	
8	Petrojet	8	1	2	5	7	17	−10	27	
9	Haras El Hodoud	8	0	2	6	3	16	−13	24	

Source: Soccerway (championship round)
Rules for classification: 1) Points; 2) Goal difference; 3) Goals scored; 4) Play-off tie.
(Note: Clubs qualified for this phase with the full regular season points they got, but without goals for or against)
(C) Champions
Notes:

Pos	Team	Pld	W	D	L	GF	GA	GD	Pts
1	ZED	8	2	5	1	9	5	+4	32
2	El Gouna	8	4	1	3	10	7	+3	30
3	Tala'ea El Gaish	8	1	5	2	5	6	−1	29
4	ENPPI	8	4	3	1	8	5	+3	27
5	Modern Sport	8	5	2	1	12	7	+5	26

Source: Soccerway (relegation round)
Rules for classification: 1) Points; 2) Goal difference; 3) Goals scored; 4) Play-off tie.
(Note: Clubs qualified for this phase with the full regular season points they got, but without goals for or against)

==== Results summary ====
Overall								Home						Away					
Pld	W	D	L	GF	GA	GD	Pts	W	D	L	GF	GA	GD	W	D	L	GF	GA	GD
8	3	4	1	6	3	+3	13	1	2	1	3	2	+1	2	2	0	3	1	+2

Last updated: 11 January 2025.

==== Results by round ====
Round	1	2	3	4	5	6	7	8	9
Ground	A	H	A	H	A	H	H	A	H
Result	D	L	D	W	W	D	D	W	
Position	8	15	14	9	5	6			

Updated to match(es) played on 11 January 2025. Source:
A = Away; H = Home; W = Win; D = Draw; L = Loss

==== Matches ====
The league schedule was released on 19 October 2024.

31 October 2024 1	El Gouna	0–0	ZED	El Gouna
17:00 UTC+3	El Sayed (penalty missed) 13'			Stadium: Khaled Bichara Stadium; Referee: Ahmed Hamdi

7 November 2024 2	ZED	0–1	Al Ahly	Cairo
20:00 UTC+2			Mohamed 11'	Stadium: Osman Ahmed Osman Stadium; Referee: Mahmoud Nagy
Note: The match was held at Osman Ahmed Osman Stadium instead of Cairo International Stadium.

24 November 2024 3	Modern Sport	0–0	ZED	Cairo
20:00 UTC+2			Gamal (penalty missed) 45+3'	Stadium: Al Salam Stadium; Referee: Tarek Magdy

30 November 2024 4	ZED	2–0	Haras El Hodoud	Cairo
17:00 UTC+2	El Banouby 18'; Ziko 42'			Stadium: Al Salam Stadium; Referee: Mostafa Osman

20 December 2024 5	Pharco	1–2	ZED	Alexandria
20:00 UTC+2	Sherif 35'		El Banouby 8'; Hussein 72'	Stadium: Haras El Hodoud Stadium; Referee: Mohamed Yousef

24 December 2024 6	ZED	0–0	ENPPI	Cairo
17:00 UTC+2				Stadium: Cairo International Stadium; Referee: Mahmoud Nassef

30 December 2024 7	ZED	1–1	Petrojet	Cairo
20:00 UTC+2	Hussein 90+6'		Hesham 89'	Stadium: Cairo International Stadium; Referee: Mohamed Adel

11 January 2025 8	Al Ittihad	0–1	ZED	Alexandria
20:00 UTC+2			Dilson 33'	Stadium: Alexandria Stadium

22 January 2025 9	ZED	v	Pyramids	Cairo
19:00 UTC+2

=== Egypt Cup ===
2 January 2025 Round of 32	ZED	3–1	Dayrout	Cairo
14:30 UTC+2	Sawaneh 6'; Samir 83' (pen.); Hany 90+2'		Ajeeb 43'	Stadium: Cairo International Stadium; Referee: Ahmed Hamed Fahim

17 January 2025 Round of 16	Smouha	1–0	ZED	Alexandria
17:30 UTC+2	Salem 8'			Stadium: Borg El Arab Stadium; Referee: Mahmoud El Banna

=== Egyptian League Cup ===
==== Group stage ====
Pos	Team	Pld	W	D	L	GF	GA	GD	Pts	Qualification
1	National Bank	4	2	2	0	9	3	+6	8	Advance to knockout stage
2	Ceramica Cleopatra	4	2	1	1	8	7	+1	7	Advance to knockout stage
3	Ghazl El Mahalla	4	1	2	1	4	5	−1	5	
4	Al Masry	4	0	4	0	3	3	0	4	
5	ZED	4	0	1	3	4	10	−6	1	

Source: EPL
Rules for classification: Group stage tiebreakers

12 December 2024 1	Ghazl El Mahalla	3–1	ZED	El Mahalla El Kubra
20:00 UTC+2	Zaky 11'; Abdul Fatawu 25'; Yehia 38'		Hussein 71' (pen.)	Stadium: Ghazl El Mahalla Stadium; Referee: Sobhy El Amrawy

19 March 2025 2	Al Masry	v	ZED	Suez
				Stadium: Suez Stadium

1 April 2025 3	ZED	v	National Bank	Cairo
				Stadium: Cairo International Stadium

23 April 2025 4	ZED	v	Ceramica Cleopatra	Cairo
				Stadium: Cairo International Stadium

== Squad statistics ==
=== Top goalscorer ===
Pos.	No.	Player	Egyptian Premier League	Egypt Cup	Egyptian League Cup	Total
FW	10	(Egypt) Mostafa Ziko	6	0	–	6
