= 2022–23 Al Ahly SC season =

Al Ahly
2022–23 season
- President: Mahmoud El Khatib
- Chairman: Mahmoud El Khatib
- Manager: Marcel Koller
- Stadium: Cairo International Stadium; Al Ahly WE Stadium (until 2 January 2023)
- Egyptian Premier League: Winners
- 2021–22 Egypt Cup: Winners
- 2022–23 Egypt Cup: Winners
- 2021–22 Egyptian Super Cup: Winners
- 2022–23 Egyptian Super Cup: Winners
- CAF Champions League: Winners
- FIFA Club World Cup: Fourth place
- Top goalscorer: Mohamed Sherif (11)
- Highest home attendance: 52,000 v Raja Casablanca
- Average home league attendance: 3,130
- Biggest win: 4–0 v Coton Sport
- Biggest defeat: 2–5 v Mamelodi Sundowns
Home colours	Away colours	Third colours
- All statistics correct as of 4 August 2023.

The 2022–23 Al-Ahly SC season was the 115th season in the football club's history and 64th consecutive and overall season in the topflight of Egyptian football, the Egyptian Premier League. In addition to the domestic league, Al Ahly also are participating in this season's editions of the domestic cup, the Egypt Cup, the Egyptian Super Cup, and the first-tier African cup, the CAF Champions League and the FIFA Club World Cup.

== Kit information ==
Supplier: Adidas
Sponsors: Etisalat by e&, FABMISR Bank, GLC Paints, Al Marasem Development, Shell Helix

Home	Home alt.	Away	Away alt. 1	Away alt. 2	Third

== Players ==
=== Current squad ===
Stats As of October 2022

Squad no.	Name	Nationality	Position(s)	Date of birth	Signed from	Apps	Goals
Goalkeepers
1	Mohamed El Shenawy(captain)	(Egypt)	GK	18 December 1988 (age 37)	(Egypt) Petrojet	211	0
16	Ali Lotfi	(Egypt)	GK	14 October 1989 (age 37)	(Egypt) ENPPI	36	0
31	Mostafa Shobier	(Egypt)	GK	17 March 2000 (age 26)	Youth academy	8	0
33	Hamza Alaa	(Egypt)	GK	1 March 2001 (age 25)	Youth academy	1	0
Defenders
2	Khaled Abdelfattah	(Egypt)	CB	22 January 1999 (age 27)	(Egypt) Smouha	0	0
4	Mahmoud Metwalli	(Egypt)	CB/DM	4 January 1993 (age 33)	(Egypt) Ismaily	28	0
5	Ramy Rabia	(Egypt)	CB/DM	20 May 1993 (age 33)	(Portugal) Sporting CP	219	15
6	Yasser Ibrahim	(Egypt)	CB	10 February 1993 (age 33)	(Egypt) Smouha	113	7
12	Ayman Ashraf	(Egypt)	CB/LB	9 April 1991 (age 35)	(Egypt) Smouha	215	5
24	Mohamed Abdelmonem	(Egypt)	CB	1 February 1999 (age 27)	Youth academy	28	3
21	Ali Maâloul	(Tunisia)	LB	3 January 1990 (age 36)	(Tunisia) CS Sfaxien	207	37
30	Mohamed Hany	(Egypt)	RB	25 January 1996 (age 30)	Youth academy	239	4
28	Karim Fouad	(Egypt)	RB	1 October 1999 (age 27)	(Egypt) Nogoom	30	0
25	Akram Tawfik	(Egypt)	RB/DM	8 November 1997 (age 29)	(Egypt) ENPPI	65	1
Midfielders
8	Hamdy Fathy	(Egypt)	DM/CB	1 October 1994 (age 32)	(Egypt) ENPPI	114	8
	Mano	(Egypt)	DM	28 June 1999 (age 27)	Youth academy	0	0
13	Marwan Attia	(Egypt)	CM/DM	1 August 1998 (age 28)	(Egypt) Al Ittihad Alexandria	0	0
15	Aliou Dieng	(Mali)	DM	16 October 1997 (age 29)	(Algeria) MC Alger	135	5
17	Amr El Solia	(Egypt)	CM/DM	2 April 1990 (age 36)	(United Arab Emirates) Al Shaab	259	24
19	Afsha	(Egypt)	AM/CM	5 March 1996 (age 30)	(Egypt) Pyramids	139	29
9	Ahmed Abdelkader	(Egypt)	AM/LM	23 May 1999 (age 27)	Youth Academy	44	7
34	Mohamed Fakhri	(Egypt)	AM/CM	30 November 1999 (age 26)	Youth academy	13	0
36	Ahmed Nabil Koka	(Egypt)	DM	5 May 2001 (age 25)	Youth academy	21	0
26	Ahmed Kendouci	(Algeria)	CM	22 June 1999 (age 27)	(Algeria) ES Sétif	0	0
Forwards
7	Kahraba	(Egypt)	ST/LW	13 April 1994 (age 32)	(Portugal) C.D. Aves	62	17
18	Mohamed Dhaoui	(Tunisia)	RW	14 May 2003 (age 23)	(Tunisia) Étoile Sportive du Sahel	0	0
10	Mohamed Sherif	(Egypt)	ST/RW/LW	4 February 1996 (age 30)	(Egypt) Wadi Degla	103	44
11	Bruno Sávio	(Brazil)	LW	1 August 1994 (age 32)	(Bolivia) Bolívar	1	0
20	Shady Hussein	(Egypt)	ST/LW	1 May 1993 (age 33)	(Egypt) Ceramica Cleopatra	1	0
14	Hussein El Shahat	(Egypt)	RW/AM/RB	21 June 1992 (age 34)	(United Arab Emirates) Al Ain	140	32
27	Taher Mohamed	(Egypt)	ST/LW	3 March 1997 (age 29)	(Egypt) Al Mokawloon	76	11
23	Percy Tau	(South Africa)	ST/LW/RW	13 May 1994 (age 32)	(England) Brighton & Hove Albion	31	8
32	Raafat Khalil	(Egypt)	RW	3 February 2004 (age 22)	Youth academy	0	0

== Transfers ==
=== Transfers in ===
#	Position	Player	Transferred from	Fee	Date	Source
	DF	(Egypt) Mohamed El Maghrabi	(Czech Republic) Teplice	End of loan	30 June 2021	
11	FW	(Brazil) Bruno Sávio	(Bolivia) Bolívar	€1.48m	10 September 2022	
20	FW	(Egypt) Shady Hussein	(Egypt) Ceramica Cleopatra	Undisclosed	12 September 2022	
	MF	(Egypt) Mostafa Saad	(Egypt) Ceramica Cleopatra	Undisclosed	15 September 2022	
18	MF	(Tunisia) Mohamed Dhaoui	(Tunisia) Étoile Sportive du Sahel	$360k	6 January 2023	
13	MF	(Egypt) Marwan Attia	(Egypt) Ittihad Alexandria	$841K	10 January 2023	
	MF	(Algeria) Ahmed Kendouci	(Algeria) ES Sétif	$920K	28 January 2023	

==== Loans in ====
#	Position	Player	Loaned from	Date	Loan expires	Source
2	DF	(Egypt) Khaled Abdelfattah	(Egypt) Smouha	6 January 2023	30 June 2023	

=== Transfers out ===
Position	Player	Transferred to	Fee	Date	Source
FW	(Senegal) Aliou Badji	(France) Amiens	$1.8m	1 June 2022	
DF	(Morocco) Badr Benoun	Qatar	$1.7m	31 July 2022	
MF	(Egypt) Walid Soliman	Retired		30 August 2022	
FW	(Egypt) Ahmed Yasser Rayyan	(Egypt) Ceramica Cleopatra	Undisclosed	13 September 2022	
DF	(Egypt) Ahmed Ramadan	(Egypt) Ceramica Cleopatra	Undisclosed	15 September 2022	
DF	(Egypt) Mohamed Shokry	(Egypt) Ceramica Cleopatra	Undisclosed	15 September 2022	

==== Loans out ====
Position	Player	Loaned to	Date	Loan expires	Source
FW	(Democratic Republic of the Congo) Walter Bwalya	(Saudi Arabia) Al Qadsiah	15 July 2022	30 June 2023	
DF	(Egypt) Mahmoud Wahid	(Egypt) Tala'ea El Gaish	24 August 2022	30 June 2023	
MF	(Mozambique) Luís Miquissone	(Saudi Arabia) Abha	3 September 2022	30 June 2023	
FW	(Egypt) Ahmed Sayed	(Egypt) Al Ittihad Alexandria	15 September 2022	30 June 2023	
FW	(Egypt) Salah Mohsen	(Egypt) Ceramica Cleopatra	10 October 2022	30 June 2023	
FW	(Egypt) Hossam Hassan	(Egypt) Smouha	4 January 2023	30 June 2023	
MF	(Egypt) Ziad Tarek	(Egypt) Smouha	7 January 2023	30 June 2024	
MF	(Egypt) Amar Hamdy	(Egypt) Al Ittihad	10 January 2023	30 June 2023	
MF	(Egypt) Mohamed Mahmoud	(Egypt) Al Ittihad	10 January 2023	30 June 2023	
DF	(Egypt) Mohamed El Maghrabi	(Egypt) Smouha	27 January 2023	30 June 2023	

== Competitions ==
Win Draw Loss

=== Overview ===
Competition	First match	Last match	Starting round	Final position	Record							
Competition	First match	Last match	Starting round	Final position	Pld	W	D	L	GF	GA	GD	Win %
Egyptian Premier League	19 October 2022	26 July 2023	Matchday 1	Winners	34	25	8	1	63	13	+50	73.53
2021–22 Egypt Cup	27 November 2022	10 April 2023	Final	Winners	3	2	1	0	6	3	+3	66.67
2022–23 Egypt Cup	25 June 2023	2023-24	Round of 32	Semi-Final	3	3	0	0	5	1	+4	100.00
2022-23 EFA Cup	N/A	N/A	Round of 16	Withdrew	1	0	0	1	0	3	−3	0.00
2021–22 Egyptian Super Cup	28 October 2022		Final	Winners	1	1	0	0	2	0	+2	100.00
2022–23 Egyptian Super Cup	5 May 2023		Final	Winner	1	1	0	0	1	0	+1	100.00
CAF Champions League	7 October 2022	11 June 2023	Second Round	Winners	14	9	3	2	24	10	+14	64.29
FIFA Club World Cup	1 February 2023	11 February 2023	First round	Fourth place	4	2	0	2	7	8	−1	50.00
Total					61	43	12	6	108	38	+70	70.49

Last updated: 5 August 2023
Source: Competitions

=== Friendlies ===
21 September 2022	Al Ahly	5–1	Petrojet	Al Ahly WE Stadium, Cairo
16:00	Hassan 13'; Rabia 20'; Abdel Kader 30'; El Solia 55'; Hussien 80'	Report	Mahmoud Felix 37'

25 September 2022	Al Ahly	2–1	Aswan	Al Ahly WE Stadium, Cairo
16:00	Taher 54'; Hassan 68'	Report	Ahmed Khalid 73'

29 September 2022	Al Ahly	0–0	Tala'ea El Gaish	Al Ahly WE Stadium, Cairo
16:00		Report

=== Egyptian Premier League ===
==== League table ====
Pos	Team	Pld	W	D	L	GF	GA	GD	Pts	Qualification or relegation
1	Al Ahly (C)	34	25	8	1	63	13	+50	83	Qualification for the Champions League second round
2	Pyramids	34	22	7	5	58	24	+34	73	Qualification for the Champions League second round
3	Zamalek	34	17	9	8	52	36	+16	60	Qualification for the Confederation Cup second round (Note: Since the 2022–23 Egypt Cup wouldn't finish by the CAF deadline for associations to submit teams participating in next season's African competitions, the spot awarded to the Egypt Cup winners (Confederation Cup first or second round) was passed to the fourth-placed team in the league.)
4	Future	34	15	13	6	34	23	+11	58	Qualification for the Confederation Cup second round
5	Al Masry	34	11	15	8	34	33	+1	48	

Source: Soccerway
Rules for classification: 1) Points; 2) Head-to-head points; 3) Head-to-head goal difference; 4) Goal difference; 5) Goals scored; 6) Play-off.
(C) Champions

==== Results summary ====
Overall								Home						Away					
Pld	W	D	L	GF	GA	GD	Pts	W	D	L	GF	GA	GD	W	D	L	GF	GA	GD
34	25	8	1	63	13	+50	83	12	5	0	29	6	+23	13	3	1	34	7	+27

Source: Soccerway

==== Results by round ====
Round	1	2	3	4	5	6	7	8	9	10	11	12	13	14	15	16	17	18	19	20	21	22	23	24	25	26	27	28	29	30	31	32	33	34
Ground	A	H	A	H	A	H	A	H	A	H	A	H	A	H	A	H	A	H	A	H	A	H	A	H	A	H	A	H	A	H	A	H	A	H
Result	W	W	W	W	W	W	D	W	D	D	W	W	D	W	W																			
Position	1	1	1	1	1	1	1	1	1	1	1	1	1	1	1																			

Updated to match(es) played on 27 January 2023. Source: Soccerway
A = Away; H = Home; W = Win; D = Draw; L = Loss

==== Matches ====
19 October 2022 1	Ismaily	0–1	Al Ahly	Alexandria
17:00 CAT (UTC+2)	Nagguez (yellow card) 19'	Report	Dieng (yellow card) 3'; Hussien 73'; Fouad (yellow card) 78'; Taher (red card) 90+3'	Stadium: Borg El Arab Stadium; Referee: Mohamed Adel

23 October 2022 2	Al Ahly	1–0	Aswan	Cairo
19:00 CAT (UTC+2)	Maâloul 17' (pen.); Abdelmonem (yellow card) 90'	Report	Amr Hossam (yellow card) 15'; Ahmed Belhadji (yellow card) 23'; Moussa (yellow card) 56'	Stadium: Al Ahly WE Stadium; Attendance: 1,985; Referee: Ahmed Ghandour

2 November 2022 3	El Dakhleya	1–4	Al Ahly	Suez
17:00 CAT (UTC+2)	Funom Alfred 13'	Report	Sherif 2'; Fathy 6'; Fouad 47', 53'	Stadium: Suez Stadium; Attendance: 988; Referee: Amin Omar

2 December 2022 5	Al Ahly	2–1	Tala'ea El Gaish	Cairo
19:00 CAT (UTC+2)	Rabia (yellow card) 41'; Ahmed Abdelkader 53'; El Solia 66' (pen.)	Report	Ahmed Meteb 25'; Samir (yellow card) 90+7'	Stadium: Al Ahly WE Stadium

7 December 2022 6	Ghazl El Mahalla	0–2	Al Ahly	El Mahalla El Kubra
17:00 CAT (UTC+2)	Voavy (yellow card) 15'; Ahmed El Nadry (yellow card) 20'; Mohamed Abdelkader (yellow card) 44'	Report	Tau 17'; Sávio 30'; Abdelmonem (yellow card) 72'	Stadium: Ghazl El Mahalla Stadium; Attendance: 6,000

12 December 2022 4	Al Ahly	3–0	Al Ittihad	Cairo
19:00 CAT (UTC+2)	Tau 12'; Yasser Ibrahim 32' (yellow card) 45'; Mohamed El Shenawy (yellow card) 46'; Akram Tawfik 90'	Report	Hisham Saleh (yellow card) 5'	Stadium: Al Ahly WE Stadium

17 December 2022 7	Al Ahly	1–1	Future	Cairo
19:00 CAT (UTC+2)	Hussein El Shahat 32'; Abdelmonem (yellow card) 51'	Report	Abdelkabir El Ouadi 32'; Saad Samir (yellow card) 90+3'; Omar Kamal (red card) 21'	Stadium: Al Ahly WE Stadium

20 December 2022 8	Pharco	1–2	Al Ahly	Alexandria
17:00 CAT (UTC+2)	Ahmed Sherif 36'; Gaber Kamel (yellow card) 50'; Mohamed Shika (yellow card) 90+4'	Report	Abdelkader 30'; Fouad (yellow card) 61'; Yasser Ibrahim (yellow card) 90+1'; Sherif 90+7'	Stadium: Borg El Arab Stadium

25 December 2022 9	Al Ahly	0–0	Smouha	Cairo
19:00 EST (UTC+2)		Report		Stadium: Al Ahly WE Al Salam Stadium; Referee: Ahmed El Ghandour

28 December 2022 10	Ceramica Cleopatra	1–1	Al Ahly	Cairo
19:00 EST (UTC+2)	Ramadan 45'	Report	Maâloul 78' (pen.)	Stadium: Cairo International Stadium; Referee: Ibrahim Nour El Din

2 January 2023 11	Al Ahly	3–0	Pyramids	Cairo
19:00 EST (UTC+2)	El Solia 19', 69'; Samy 90+4' (o.g.)	Report	Chibi (yellow card) 64'	Stadium: Cairo International Stadium; Attendance: 3,000; Referee: Szymon Marciniak (Poland)
Note: The match originally scheduled to be played at Al Ahly WE Al Salam Stadium was moved at the request of Al Ahly.

5 January 2023 12	ENPPI	0–2	Al Ahly	Cairo
17:00 EST (UTC+2)	Reda (yellow card) 41'	Report	Afsha 59', (yellow card) 59'; Dieng 77'	Stadium: Osman Ahmed Osman Stadium; Referee: Mahmoud El Banna

12 January 2023 13	Al Ahly	0–0	Al Masry	Borg El Arab
19:00 EST (UTC+2)	Hussein (yellow card) 90+4'; Metwaly (yellow card) 90+8'	Report	El Sayed (yellow card) 84'; Eze (yellow card) 90+5'	Stadium: Borg El Arab Stadium; Referee: Walid Abdelrazek

21 January 2023 14	Zamalek	0–3	Al Ahly	Cairo
20:30 CAT (UTC+2)		Report	Kahraba 61' (yellow card) 62'; Sherif 75', 90'; Taher (yellow card) 82'	Stadium: Cairo Stadium; Attendance: 6,000; Referee: Slavko Vinčić

24 January 2023 15	Al Ahly	1–0	National Bank of Egypt	Cairo
19:00 EST (UTC+2)	Sherif 32'	Report	Ibrahim (yellow card) 61'	Stadium: Cairo International Stadium; Attendance: 3,000; Referee: Ahmed Ghandour

21 February 2023 19	Aswan	0–3	Al Ahly	Aswan
14:45 EST (UTC+2)		Report	Kahraba 34'; Ahmed Abdelkader 41'; Afsha 45+2'	Stadium: Aswan Stadium; Referee: Mahmoud El Banna

28 February 2023 20	Al Ahly	1–1	El Dakhleya	Cairo
19:00 EST (UTC+2)	Kahraba 70'	Report	Ahmed Abdel Rasoul (red card) 80'; Rasheed Ahmed 90'	Stadium: Al Ahly WE Stadium; Referee: Mohamed Maarouf

7 March 2023 17	Al Ahly	2–1	Al Mokawloon Al Arab	Cairo
17:00 EST (UTC+2)	Maâloul 3' (pen.); Farouck Kabore 22' (o.g.)	Report	John Okoli 43'	Stadium: Al Ahly WE Stadium; Referee: Mohamed El Hanafi

5 April 2023 23	Al Ahly	3–0	Ghazl El Mahalla	Cairo
21:15 EST (UTC+2)	Mostafa El Aash 41' (o.g.); Maâloul 57' (pen.); Sherif 90'	Report	Ehab Samir (yellow card) 41'; Ahmed El Nadry (yellow card) 45+2'	Stadium: Cairo Stadium; Attendance: 3,000; Referee: Mahmoud El Banna

14 April 2023 25	Al Ahly	3–0	Pharco	Cairo
21:15 EST (UTC+2)	Metwalli 18'; Sherif 45+2'; Fathy (yellow card) 66'; El Shenawy (yellow card) 87'; Maâloul 90+6' (pen.)	Report	Sokari (yellow card) 29'	Stadium: Cairo Stadium; Attendance: 3,000; Referee: Nader Kamar

17 April 2023 26	Smouha	0–2	Al Ahly	Alexandria
21:15 EST (UTC+2)	Ahmed Shousha (yellow card) 69'; Ahmed Gamal (yellow card) 90+2'	Report	Sherif 28'; Abdelmonem (yellow card) 49'; Kahraba 66'; El Shenawy (red card) 90+1'	Stadium: Borg El Arab stadium Referee: Tarek Magdy

23 May 2023 29	Al Ahly	2–0	ENPPI	Cairo
21:30 EST (UTC+3)	Sherif 29'; Abdel Kader 35'	Report		Stadium: Cairo Stadium; Referee: Mahmoud Bassiouni

26 May 2023 22	Tala'ea El Gaish	0–2	Al Ahly	Cairo
20:00 EST (UTC+3)	Hamdy (yellow card) 45+5'; Mohareb (yellow card) 58'; Camacho (yellow card) 89'; Samir (red card) 89'; Shawky (yellow card) 90+2'	Report	Abdel Kader (yellow card) 45+4'; El Solia (yellow card) 45+4' (goal) 90+1' (pen.); Afsha 46'	Stadium: Cairo Military Academy Stadium; Referee: Mahmoud El Banna

29 May 2023 27	Al Ahly	1–0	Ceramica Cleopatra	Cairo
21:30 EST (UTC+3)	Kahraba (yellow card) 7'; Metwalli (yellow card) 16'; El Shahat 57'	Report	Gaber (yellow card) 31'	Stadium: Cairo Stadium; Referee: Mohamed Adel

22 June 2023 16	Haras El Hodoud	0–3	Al Ahly	Cairo
21:30 EST (UTC+3)	Yasser (yellow card) 26'	Report	Benwali 4' (o.g.); Abdel Kader 56'; Taher 64'	Stadium: Cairo Military Academy Stadium; Attendance: 3,000; Referee: Amin Omar

29 June 2023 32	National Bank of Egypt	0–3	Al Ahly	Cairo
21:30 EST (UTC+3)	Fathy (yellow card) 87'	Report	Maaloul 18'; Abdel Kader 30'; Kahraba 90+3'	Stadium: Cairo Stadium; Referee: Mohamed El Hanafi

2 July 2023 24	Future	0–0	Al Ahly	Cairo
20:30 EST (UTC+3)	Maher (yellow card) 78'	Report	Abdelmonem (yellow card) 90+6'	Stadium: Al Salam Stadium; Referee: Mahmoud El Banna

5 July 2023 18	Al Ahly	1–0	Ismaily	Alexandria
20:30 EST (UTC+3)	Tau 50' Dieng (yellow card) 54' Hany (yellow card) 90+2'	Report	El Mohamady (yellow card) 90+2'	Stadium: Borg El Arab Stadium; Referee: Ahmed Ghandour

8 July 2023 21	Al Ittihad	0–2	Al Ahly	Alexandria
19:00 EST (UTC+3)	Soliman (yellow card) 68'; El Ghandour (yellow card) 54' (yellow-red card) 88'; Khaled Sobhi (yellow card) 90+2'	Report	Maâloul 10' (pen.); Kahraba 13'; Tau (yellow card) 66' Rabia (yellow card) 90+1'	Stadium: Borg El Arab Stadium; Referee: Mohamed Maarouf

13 July 2023 31	Al Ahly	4–1	Zamalek	Cairo
20:30 EST (UTC+3)	El Shahat 2' 36'; Maâloul 45+1'; Yasser (yellow card) 65'; Abdelmonem (yellow card) 68'; Hany (yellow card) 71'; Dhaoui (yellow card) 82'; Sherif 90+4'	Report	Zizo 68' (pen.); Abdul-Majeed (yellow card) 44' Mansi (yellow card) 78'	Stadium: Cairo Stadium; Referee: Mahmoud El-Banna

17 July 2023 34	Al Mokawloon Al Arab	1–4	Al Ahly	Cairo
19:00 EST (UTC+3)	Ochaya 24'; Omar Fayed (yellow card) 36'	Report	Dieng 17'; Sherif 52'; Taher 68' 90' (pen.)	Stadium: Osman Ahmed Osman Stadium; Referee: Mostafa Osman

19 July 2023 33	Al Ahly	1–1	Haras El Hodoud	Cairo
20:30 EST (UTC+3)	Odoh (yellow card) 28'; Hamza (yellow card) 32'; Emad (yellow card) 68'; El Kadi (yellow card) 75'; Abdelfattah 80' (o.g.)	Report	Kahraba 71'	Stadium: Cairo Stadium; Attendance: 5,000; Referee: Mohamed El Hanafi

23 July 2023 28	Pyramids	3–0	Al Ahly	Cairo
20:30 EST (UTC+3)	Abdelmonem 39' (o.g.); Lakay (yellow card) 45' (goal) 77'; Samy (yellow card) 63'; Fathy (yellow card) 65'; Chibi (yellow card) 74'; Tawfik (yellow card) 87' (yellow-red card) 90+4'; Fathi 90+1'	Report	Attia (yellow card) 40'; Abdelmonem (yellow card) 63'; El Shahat (penalty missed) 90+10'	Stadium: 30 June Stadium; Attendance: 3,000; Referee: Mahmoud Nagi

26 July 2023 28	Al Masry	0–0	Al Ahly	Alexandria
20:30 EST (UTC+3)	El Gazzar (yellow card) 33' Jelassi (yellow card) 61' Ali (yellow card) 90+4'	Report		Stadium: Borg El Arab stadium Referee: Mohamed Maarouf

=== Egypt Cup ===
==== 2021–22 Egypt Cup ====
All times are CAT (UTC+2).

27 November 2022 Quarter Final	Al Ahly	1–1 (a.e.t.) (4–3 p)	Al Mokawloon Al Arab	Cairo
20:00	Fouad 68'	Report	Okoli 76'	Stadium: Al Ahly WE Stadium
	Penalties
	Rabia (penalty scored); Hany (penalty scored); Dieng (penalty scored); Yasser Ibrahim (penalty scored)		(penalty missed) Kabore; (penalty scored) Ahmed Alaa Eldin; (penalty scored) Amir Abed; (penalty scored) Ochaya; (penalty missed) Omar Fayed

16 January 2023 Semi Final	Al Ahly	3–1	Smouha	Cairo
19:00	Abdel Kader 8'; Fathy 11'; Kahraba 35'	Report	Douko Dodo (yellow card) 51'; Hassan (pen.), 90+1'	Stadium: Cairo Stadium; Attendance: 3,000; Referee: Tarek Magdy

10 April 2023 Final	Al Ahly	2–1	Pyramids	Cairo
21:00	El Shahat (yellow card) 47'; Abdelmonem (yellow card) 74' (yellow-red card) 116'; Kahraba 74'; Fathy (yellow card) 85' (goal) 105'		Touré (yellow card) 27'; Adel (yellow card) 45+1'; El Karti 71'; Samy (yellow card) 74'; Issa (yellow card) 80'; Chibi (yellow card) 101'; Tawfik (yellow card) 104'	Stadium: Cairo Stadium; Attendance: 10,000; Referee: Amin Omar

==== 2022–23 Egypt Cup ====
25 June 2023 (Note: The Al Ahly v Suez match, originally scheduled to be played between 7 and 11 May 2023, was postponed to avoid scheduling conflicts with Al Ahly's fixtures in the 2022–23 CAF Champions League.) Round of 32	Al Ahly	1–0	Suez	Cairo
20:30 EST (UTC+3)	El Shahat 87'	Report		Stadium: Cairo International Stadium; Referee: Hesham El Fallal

30 July 2023 (Note: The Al Ahly v El Dakhleya match, originally scheduled to be played between 22 and 24 June 2023, was postponed as Al Ahly's participation in the match was not determined by the time of the fixture, due to the postponement of their match in the round of 32.) Round of 16	Al Ahly	2–0	El Dakhleya	Cairo
20:30 EST (UTC+3)	Tau 38'; Magdy 90+2'	Report		Stadium: Cairo Military Academy Stadium; Referee: Mohamed Youssef

3 August 2023 (Note: The Al Ahly v Al Masry match, originally scheduled to be played on 3 or 4 July 2023, was postponed as both participating teams in the match were not determined yet by the time of the fixture.) Quarter Final	Al Ahly	2–1 (a.e.t.)	Al Masry	Alexandria
18:00	Maâloul 90+10' (pen.); Kendouci 108'	Report	Hamdy 90+5'	Stadium: Borg El Arab Stadium; Referee: Abdel Aziz El Sayed

=== Egyptian Super Cup ===
28 October 2022 Final	Zamalek	0–2	Al Ahly	Al Ain, United Arab Emirates
21:00 GST (UTC+4)		Report	Sávio 39'; Fouad 90+1'	Stadium: Hazza bin Zayed Stadium; Attendance: 25,000; Referee: Fábio Veríssimo (Portugal)

5 May 2023 Final	Pyramids	0-1	Al Ahly	Abu Dhabi, United Arab Emirates
TBD GST (UTC+4)		Report	Ali Maâloul 96'	Stadium: Mohammed bin Zayed Stadium; Attendance: 22 823; Referee: Mohammed El Banna

=== CAF Champions League ===
==== Qualifying rounds ====
The draw of the qualifying rounds was held on 9 August 2022.

===== Second round =====
9 October 2022 First leg	US Monastir (Tunisia)	0–1	(Egypt) Al Ahly	Monastir
15:00 UTC+1		Report	Abdelmonem 90+1'	Stadium: Stade Mustapha Ben Jannet; Referee: Lahlou Benbraham (Algeria)

15 October 2022 Second leg	Al Ahly (Egypt)	3–0 (4–0 agg.)	US Monastir (Tunisia)	Cairo
18:00 UTC+2	Abdel Kader 15'; Fathy 43', 57'	Report		Stadium: Al Ahly WE Al Salam Stadium; Attendance: 10,000; Referee: Janny Sikazwe (Zambia)

==== Group stage ====
The draw of the group stage was held on 12 December 2022.

Group B

Pos	Team	Pld	W	D	L	GF	GA	GD	Pts	Qualification	MDS	ASC	HIL	CSG
1	(South Africa) Mamelodi Sundowns	6	4	2	0	14	7	+7	14	Advance to knockout stage	—	5–2	1–0	2–1
2	(Egypt) Al Ahly	6	3	1	2	14	8	+6	10 (Note: Head-to-head points: Al Ahly 3, Al Hilal 3. Head-to-head goal difference: Al Ahly +2, Al Hilal -2)	Advance to knockout stage	2–2	—	3–0	3–0
3	(Sudan) Al Hilal	6	3	1	2	6	6	0	10		1–1	1–0	—	2–0
4	(Cameroon) Coton Sport	6	0	0	6	3	16	−13	0		1–3	0–4	1–2	—

Source: CAF
Notes:

18 February 2023 Matchday 2	Al Hilal (Sudan)	1–0	(Egypt) Al Ahly	Omdurman
16:00 UTC+2	Lilepo 53'	Report		Stadium: Al Hilal Stadium; Referee: Dahane Beida (Mauritania)

25 February 2023 Matchday 3	Al Ahly (Egypt)	2–2	(South Africa) Mamelodi Sundowns	Cairo
21:00 UTC+2	Abdelmonem 59'; El Shahat 74'	Report	Shalulile 34'; Morena 80'	Stadium: Al Ahly WE Al Salam Stadium; Referee: Bamlak Tessema Weyesa (Ethiopia)

4 March 2023 Matchday 1	Al Ahly (Egypt)	3–0	(Cameroon) Coton Sport	Cairo
17:00 UTC+2	Sherif 1'; Kendouci 40'; Rafaat Khalil 90+2'	Report		Stadium: Al Ahly WE Al Salam Stadium; Attendance: 20,000; Referee: Ahmad Imtehaz Heeralall (Mauritius)

7 March 2023 Matchday 4	Mamelodi Sundowns (South Africa)	5–2	(Egypt) Al Ahly	Pretoria
15:00 UTC+2	Allende 4'; Zwane 24'; Mokoena 40'; Shalulile 72', 88'	Report	Sherif 13'; Tau 61'	Stadium: Loftus Versfeld Stadium; Referee: Issa Sy (Senegal)

17 March 2023 Matchday 5	Coton Sport (Cameroon)	0–4	(Egypt) Al Ahly	Garoua
18:00 UTC+2		Report	Kahraba 23', 29', 51'; Tau 54'	Stadium: Roumdé Adjia Stadium; Referee: Peter Waweru (Kenya)

1 April 2023 Matchday 6	Al Ahly (Egypt)	3–0	(Sudan) Al Hilal	Cairo
21:00 UTC+2	Kahraba 25'; El Shahat 64', 81'	Report		Stadium: Al Ahly WE Al Salam Stadium; Attendance: 50,000; Referee: Abdel Aziz Mohamed Bouh (Mauritania)

==== Knockout stage ====
The draw for the knockout stage was held on 5 April 2023.

===== Quarter-finals =====
22 April 2023 First leg	Al Ahly (Egypt)	2–0	(Morocco) Raja CA	Cairo International Stadium, Cairo
21:00 UTC+2	Abdelmonem 45+2'; Fathy 84'	Report		Attendance: 52,000; Referee: Mahmood Ismail (Sudan)

29 April 2023 Second leg	Raja CA (Morocco)	0–0	(Egypt) Al Ahly	Stade Mohammed V, Casablanca
20:00 UTC+1		Report		Attendance: 39,000; Referee: Ibrahim Mutaz (Libya)

Al Ahly won 2–0 on aggregate.

===== Semi-finals =====
12 May 2023 First leg	Espérance de Tunis (Tunisia)	0–3	(Egypt) Al Ahly	Stade Hammadi Agrebi, Tunis
20:00 UTC+1		Report	Tau 8', 55'; Kahraba 75'	Attendance: 0 (close doors); Referee: Peter Waweru (Kenya)

19 May 2023 Second leg	Al Ahly (Egypt)	1–0	(Tunisia) Espérance de Tunis	Cairo International Stadium, Cairo
22:00 UTC+3	El Shahat 22'	Report		Attendance: 10,000; Referee: Dahane Beida (Mauritania)

Al Ahly won 4–0 on aggregate.

===== Final =====
4 June 2023 First leg	Al Ahly (Egypt)	2–1	(Morocco) Wydad AC	Cairo International Stadium, Cairo
21:00 UTC+3	Tau 45+4'; Kahraba 59'	Report	Bouhra 86'	Attendance: 50,000; Referee: Ibrahim Mutaz (Libya)

11 June 2023 Second leg	Wydad AC (Morocco)	1–1	(Egypt) Al Ahly	Stade Mohammed V, Casablanca
20:00 UTC+1	Attiyat Allah 27'	Report	Abdelmonem 78'	Attendance: 45,000; Referee: Bamlak Tessema Weyesa (Ethiopia)

Al Ahly won 3–2 on aggregate.

=== FIFA Club World Cup ===
Al Ahly will be participating in the tournament as the CAF representative after Wydad qualified as the host.

1 February 2023 First round	Al Ahly (Egypt)	3–0	(New Zealand) Auckland City	Ibn Batouta Stadium, Tangier
21:00	Hussein El Shahat 45+2'; Sherif 56'; Tau 86'	Report	Adam Mitchell (red card) 90+7'	Attendance: 47,137; Referee: Ma Ning (China)

4 February 2023 second round	Seattle Sounders FC (United States)	0–1	(Egypt) Al Ahly	Ibn Batouta Stadium, Tangier
18:00		Report	Magdy 88'	Attendance: 30,589; Referee: Anthony Taylor (England)

8 February 2023 Semi-finals	Al Ahly (Egypt)	1–4	(Spain) Real Madrid	Prince Moulay Abdellah Stadium, Rabat
20:00	Maâloul 65' (pen.)	Report	Vinícius 42'; Valverde 46'; Rodrygo 90+2'; Arribas 90+8'	Attendance: 43,508; Referee: Andrés Matonte (Uruguay)

11 February 2023 Third place match	Al Ahly (Egypt)	2–4	(Brazil) Flamengo	Ibn Batouta Stadium, Tangier
16:30	Abdel Kader 38', 60'	Report	Gabriel Barbosa 11' (pen.), 85' (pen.); Pedro 77', 90+1'	Attendance: 30,216; Referee: Mustapha Ghorbal (Algeria)

== Statistics ==
=== Goalscorers ===
As of 19 August 2023

Rank	Pos.	Name	Premier League	Egypt Cup	EFA Cup	Egyptian Super Cup	CAF Champions League	FIFA Club World Cup	Total
1	FW	(Egypt) Kahraba	7	2	0	0	6	0	15
2	FW	(Egypt) Sherif	11	0	0	0	2	1	14
3	DF	(Tunisia) Maâloul	8	1	0	1	0	1	11
4	MF	(Egypt) El Shahat	4	1	0	0	4	1	10
4	FW	(South Africa) Tau	3	1	0	0	5	1	10
4	FW	(Egypt) Abd Elkader	6	1	0	0	1	2	10
7	MF	(Egypt) Hamdy	1	2	0	0	3	0	6
8	MF	(Egypt) Afsha	3	1	0	0	0	1	5
9	MF	(Egypt) El Solia	4	0	0	0	0	0	4
9	DF	(Egypt) Karim	2	1	0	1	0	0	4
9	DF	(Egypt) Abdelmonem	0	0	0	0	4	0	4
12	FW	(Egypt) Taher	3	0	0	0	0	0	3
13	FW	(Brazil) Bruno	1	0	0	1	0	0	2
13	DF	(Mali) Dieng	2	0	0	0	0	0	2
13	MF	(Algeria) Kendouci	0	1	0	0	1	0	2
16	FW	(Egypt) Shady	1	0	0	0	0	0	1
16	DF	(Egypt) Yasser	1	0	0	0	0	0	1
16	MF	(Egypt) Akram	1	0	0	0	0	0	1
16	MF	(Egypt) Khalil	0	0	0	0	1	0	1
16	DF	(Egypt) Metwalli	1	0	0	0	0	0	1
Own goals			4	0	0	0	0	0	4
Total			63	11	0	3	27	7	111

=== Clean sheets ===
As of 26 February 2023

Rank	Name	Premier League	Egypt Cup	EFA Cup	Egyptian Super Cup	CAF Champions League	FIFA Club World Cup	Total
1	(Egypt) Mohamed El Shenawy	11	0	0	1	2	2	16
Total		11	0	0	1	2	2	16
