= Mostafa Ziko =

Egyptian footballer (born 1997)

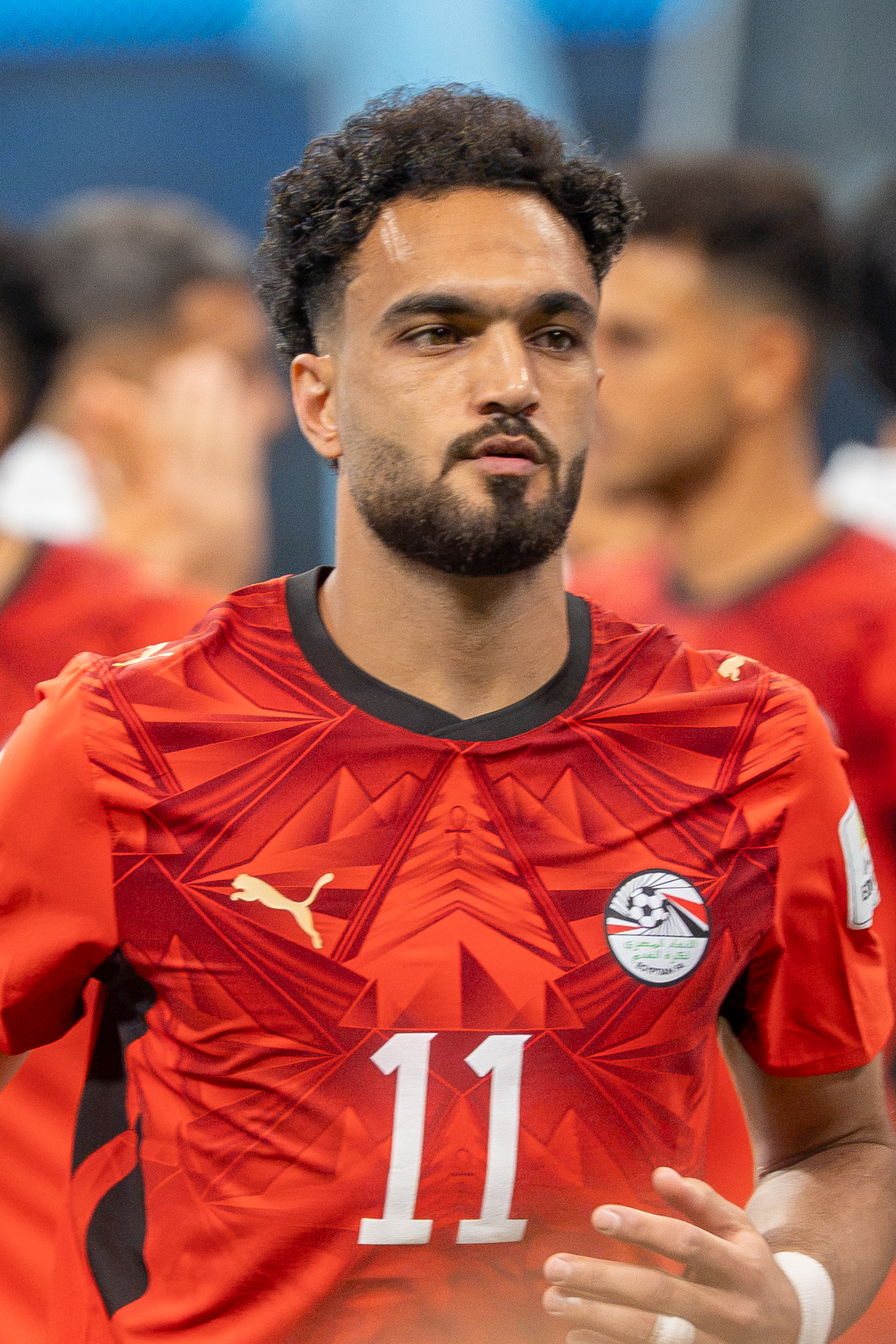
- Ziko with Egypt in 2026

Personal information
- Full name: Mostafa Mohamed Zaky Abdelraouf
- Date of birth: 27 April 1997 (age 29)
- Place of birth: Shibin El Kom, Egypt
- Height: 1.79 m (5 ft 10 in)
- Positions: Left winger; forward

Team information
- Current team: Pyramids
- Number: 30

Senior career*
Years	Team	Apps	(Gls)
2016–2019	Gomhoriat Shebin		
2019–2023	Haras El Hodoud		
2023–2025	ZED	56	(18)
2025–	Pyramids	22	(6)

International career^{‡}
2026–	Egypt	9	(5)
- * Club domestic league appearances and goals as of 17:36, 1 June 2026 (UTC) ‡ National team caps and goals as of 29 September 2026

Mostafa Mohamed Zaky Abdelraouf (Note: Arabic: مصطفى محمد زكي عبد الرؤوف) (born 27 April 1997), known as Mostafa Ziko or simply Ziko, (Note: Arabic: زيكو) is an Egyptian professional footballer who plays as a left winger or forward for Egyptian Premier League club Pyramids and the Egypt national team.

Ziko began his career with Gomhoriat Shebin, before joining Haras El Hodoud in 2019, where he developed as a winger in the Egyptian Premier League. In 2023, he joined ZED, and was the club's top scorer in both seasons he spent there. In 2025 Ziko joined Pyramids, where he won the Egypt Cup, the CAF Super Cup, and the FIFA African–Asian–Pacific Cup in his first season.

Uncapped at youth level, Ziko made his debut for the Egyptian senior side in 2026 at the age of 29. He was subsequently named in Egypt's squad for the 2026 FIFA World Cup, scoring two goals in Egypt's run to the round of 16.

== Early life ==
Mostafa Mohamed Zaky Abdelraouf was born on 27 April 1997 in Shibin El Kom, Egypt. After losing his father at 14, Ziko had to work in the family clothing shop in Shibin El Kom, Monufia. His elder brother, who originally had the nickname 'Ziko', gave up football to prioritise his career. His nickname 'Ziko' references the Brazilian footballer Zico, whom his father admired.

== Club career ==
=== Early career ===
Ziko began his career at Gomhoriat Shebin. In 2022, his former coach there, Samir Kamouna, told FilGoal: "He is an exceptional player; during my time managing Gomhoreyat Shebin, he performed brilliantly and caught the eye of several clubs ... Zico received numerous offers during my tenure – with ENPPI and Ismaily being the most interested – but financial disagreements scuppered a move to either club, so he remained with the team."

Ziko then joined Haras El Hodoud in 2019; the deal included a 25% sell-on clause. He played his debut season in the Egyptian Premier League in the 2022–23 campaign, and opened his goalscoring account for that season in a 2–1 loss to Cleopatra FC on 12 December 2022. On 3 January 2023, he scored a penalty in a 2–2 draw to Al Mokawloon. On 8 January, in his next match, Ziko scored a brace against Ismaily; the match ended 2–0. On 5 February, he scored and assisted in a 1–2 win over Ghazl El Mahalla. On 5 March, Ziko earned the man of the match award for his performance in a goalless draw to Cleopatra FC. After the club set his release clause at 40 million Egyptian pounds, Ziko said on 22 March 2023: "I was surprised by Haras El Hodoud's demand for 40 million pounds for my departure; I believe no player in Egypt is worth that amount." He also said: "We are currently focused on pulling the club out of its slump, as Haras El Hodoud is a club with a history of winning titles, and its current position does not befit it." On 4 May, he scored a penalty and assisted in a 1–3 loss to Tala'ea El Gaish. Overall, across the season, Zico won the man of the match award 7 times – more than any other player in the 2022–23 Egyptian Premier League. Speaking of the subsequent summer transfer window, Ziko's brother, Mohamed Abdel-Raouf, later said: "My brother received numerous offers before Haras El Hodoud was promoted to the Premier League, but the club insisted on keeping him and refused to let him leave." In 2025, Amr Abdel Moneim of FilGoal wrote that at Haras, "Ziko proved his abilities to the entire Egyptian league; despite playing for a team constantly battling to avoid relegation, he stood out as one of the league's top performers based on statistical data."

=== ZED ===
==== 2023–24: ZED top scorer and Egypt Cup final ====
In August 2023, Ziko joined ZED FC from Haras El Hodoud on a five-season contract, taking the squad number 10. Haras then signed his elder brother, Mohamed Abdel-Raouf, from Tanta. On 11 September, Ziko revealed that he had been close to joining Al Masry, "but ZED finalised the deal at the last minute." On 5 October, Ziko scored a brace in a 3–3 draw against Baladiyat. On 22 October, Ziko netted a penalty in a 3–3 draw to Al Mokawloon; the game set the record for the most penalties in the Egyptian Premier League, with 5. On 28 October, he scored in a 1–1 draw to Smouha, capitalising on a mistake by goalkeeper El Hany Soliman. On 3 November 2023, Ziko scored as part of a comeback 1–2 victory over Zamalek, ZED's first ever win against the club. Ziko therefore scored his fifth goal in four consecutive matches, and moved just below Mabululu of Al Ittihad in the race to become the league's top scorer. Speaking to ON Time Sports after the match, Ziko said: "We conceded an early goal within the first five minutes, but managing to come back and win against a big team like Zamalek is a hallmark of top-tier teams." On 15 December, Ziko scored a penalty against Pharco to win the game 1–2. Consequently, he rose to the top of the league scoring charts with six goals, tying with Mabululu, Hossam Ashraf of Baladiyat, and Ahmed Belhadji of Gouna. On 27 December 2023, Ziko scored in a 3–1 league win over El Dakhleya, making him the league's top goalscorer outright. After the match, speaking to ON Time Sports, Ziko said: "ZED is leading the league and I am the league's top scorer; it is a truly wonderful feeling." When asked about transfer offers, he replied: "I am part of an organisation that is on par with any other club in the league. I feel comfortable at ZED; the management meets all the players' needs. I am at the club's disposal – whether I leave after receiving good offers or stay with ZED, I would be very happy either way."

On 27 April 2024, Ziko scored a penalty in a 0–3 win over Baladiyat; Akhbar El-syaha reported that he "returned to the scoresheet" after a period without a goal. With eight league goals, he trailed Mabululu and Ashraf, who each had 11 goals. On 28 May, Ziko scored a 90+6th-minute equaliser with a volley against El Dakhleya in the round of 32 of the Egypt Cup, helping ZED to a 2–1 win after extra time. On 27 June, he scored and assisted in a 4–1 rout of Talaea El Gaish; he repeated the feat in a 1–4 victory over ENPPI on 21 July. On 4 August, he scored "with a powerful header" in a 2–1 defeat to Pyramids. On 14 August, he scored the sole goal with another header in a 1–0 victory over Al Masry, securing ZED's first-ever win over the club and ending their three-match losing streak. On 30 August 2024, Ziko's ZED lost 1–0 to Pyramids in the Egypt Cup final. Journalists wrote that Ziko had, over the course of the season, established himself as one of the Egyptian Premier League's most effective wingers; Ziko finished the season with 12 league goals, meaning he was ZED's top and the league's joint-fourth top scorer. Islam Ahmed of FilGoal reported that Ziko also won the joint-most penalties and made the joint-most appearances in the league.

==== 2024–25: ZED top scorer ====
On 12 October 2024, FilGoal reported that Al Ahly's sporting director, Mohamed Ramadan, was attempting to convince head coach Marcel Koller to agree to the signing of ZED duo Ziko and Abdelrahman El Banouby before the closing of the transfer window 25 October. In November, ZED's CEO, Ahmed Abdallah, noted external interest in Ziko, saying: "Pyramids FC was the most persistent in seeking Ziko, followed by Zamalek, and finally Al Ahly." On 30 November, Ziko scored in a 2–0 win over his former club Haras El Hodoud, helping ZED to its first league win that season. On 28 January 2025, Ziko netted in a 2–1 loss against Smouha. On 12 February, Ziko scored "arguably the league's best goal of the season – a spectacular bicycle kick – in the 69th minute" of a 1–1 draw against Cleopatra FC. Ziko had a second goal in the 95th minute ruled out for offside. On 27 February, Ziko scored in a 1–1 draw to Zamalek.

On 11 May 2025, Ziko scored and assisted in a 2–2 draw to Modern Sport. He scored in his next match, netting in a 1–1 draw to ENPPI on 25 May. Ziko again finished as the club's top scorer in the 2024–25 season, scoring 6 times. At the end of the season, ZED reportedly received offers for Ziko from three Egyptian clubs, including Zamalek and Pyramids, and a Gulf-based side. Although reports from 3 August said that Pyramids and ZED had agreed a transfer for Ziko, on 4 August ZED released an official statement, saying: "The club's management is currently evaluating all available options, and an appropriate decision will be made in the coming hours." Ziko transferred to Pyramids on 7 August.

=== Pyramids ===
==== 2025–2026: First season and three titles ====
On 7 August 2025, Ziko signed for Pyramids FC on a contract lasting until June 2029, joining a side that had won their first-ever CAF Champions League title earlier that year. He therefore became Pyramids' second signing of the summer, following Ewerton. The deal was reportedly worth 35 million Egyptian pounds and included the loan of Mahmoud Saber and the sale of Youssef Osama to ZED. Ziko scored his first goal in the FIFA Intercontinental Cup, and first Pyramids goal, on 14 September in a 3–0 victory over Auckland City, with "a composed finish in the 85th minute". Ziko scored his first Pyramids league goal on 18 September, heading in the winner in a 1–0 victory over his former club ZED. On 23 September, Ziko was an unused substitute as Pyramids won the African–Asian–Pacific Cup 1–3 against Al-Ahli, the club's first international title. On 5 October, Ziko opened the scoring in a 3–0 win "with a well-taken finish from inside the box" against APR FC in the first round of the 2025–26 CAF Champions League. In his post-match interview, Ziko said: "The scoreline might make it look like an easy match, but on the contrary, APR FC has good players, and the game was difficult." He added: "This match was special for me as it was my first appearance [in the CAF Champions League], and I also scored my first goal in the tournament." On 18 October, Ziko was an unused substitute as Pyramids won the 2025 CAF Super Cup 1–0 against RS Berkane. On 30 October, Ziko scored in Pyramids' 2–0 CAF Champions League win over Ethiopian Insurance. Ziko scored in Pyramids' 2–1 loss to Cleopatra FC in the third-place play-off of the 2025 Egyptian Super Cup on 9 November. Ziko scored his first brace in a 2–2 draw against Petrojet on 6 December. On 11 December, before the upcoming Challenger Cup match against Flamengo, Ziko said that it was "a great honour" to face the side where his namesake Zico played. On 13 December, Ziko played 74 minutes of the match; Pyramids lost 2–0. On 22 December, Ziko scored in a 2–0 win over Masar in the round of 32 in the 2025–26 Egypt Cup.

On 20 January 2026, Ziko scored in a 3–0 win over Gouna in the round of 16 in the Egypt Cup. He scored in his second consecutive league match in a 1–1 draw to Gouna on 28 January. On 14 February, Ziko scored his final CAF Champions League goal of the season in a 3–1 win over Power Dynamos, helping Pyramids progress from Group A. On 1 March, Pyramids exited the CAF Champions League after a 1–2 loss to AS FAR. On 3 April, Ziko scored and assisted in a 4–0 rout of ENPPI in the semi-final of the Egypt Cup. Hence, Pyramids progressed to the final against ZED, a repeat of the 2024 final in which Ziko was on the losing side. On 1 May, Ziko scored a second brace in a 3–2 win against ENPPI; Amr Osama of Yallakora wrote that "Mostafa Ziko has emerged as Pyramids' 'savior' for the fourth time this league season", citing his previous contributions against ZED, Petrojet and Gouna.

On 10 May, Pyramids beat ZED 2–1 in the Egypt Cup final; Ziko received a late red card in the 81st minute after a challenge on Pyramids loanee Tarek Alaa. Speaking to ON Sport in his post-match interview, Ziko said: "This season has been exceptional for me, as I have won three trophies, and God willing, we will win even more." Referring to Pyramids' league title prospects, he added: "As long as the league hasn't been mathematically decided, it remains up for grabs. If Zamalek loses their next match and we win, we will be crowned champions. We will play until the final minute; God willing, we will win the league title." However, whilst Pyramids won their final league match against Smouha 2–1 on 20 May, with Ziko suspended owing to his accumulation of yellow cards, Zamalek also won theirs against Cleopatra 1–0 to clinch the title. After his successful season, Ziko was rewarded with his first international appearances and a place in Egypt's 2026 FIFA World Cup squad. Amr Abdel Moneim of FilGoal wrote that "[l]ess than a year ago, when Mostafa Abdel-Raouf 'Ziko' transferred from ZED FC to Pyramids FC, anyone asked about his prospects would have predicted – even the most optimistic Egyptian fans – that he would simply try to secure a starting spot in the squad of the 'Sky Blues' ... Yet, in less than a year, Ziko surprised everyone. ... It was a career turnaround beyond anyone's imagination." He added: "Ziko rose rapidly from obscurity, achieving in a short time what takes other players years to accomplish."

== International career ==
Ziko was first called up to the Egypt national team in late 2022 under coach Rui Vitória. Commenting on his inclusion, his Haras el Hodoud manager Ahmed Ayoub said: "When I first saw him, I knew he would become a shining star in the league and eventually be selected for the Egypt national team. He possesses all the attributes; he just needs to improve his finishing in front of goal." Ziko himself said: "I am overjoyed to have joined the Egyptian national team; it is a feeling I cannot describe. I thank all the coaches and teammates who supported me; every coach I worked with told me I would reach great heights." However, he did not make an appearance. In 2026, he received another call-up under coach Hossam Hassan for the final training camp before the World Cup. On 28 May, he made his debut for the national team against the Russia national team, and scored the only goal of the match. He then scored his second goal in a 2–1 friendly defeat to Brazil on 6 June 2026, capitalising on a mistake by Marquinhos. This earned him praise from his namesake, Zico.

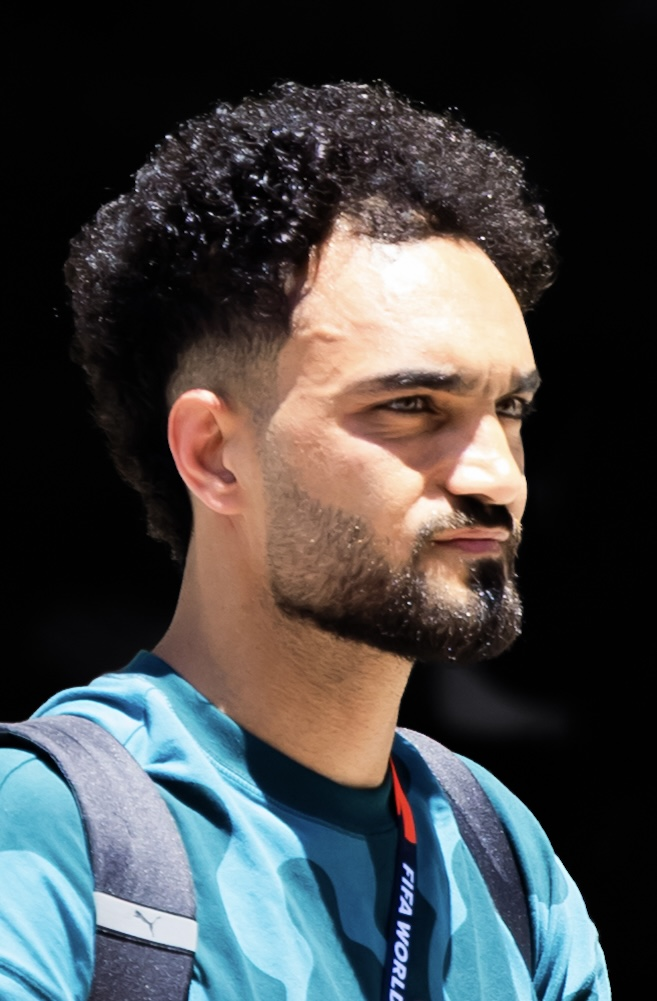
Ziko with the Egypt national football team in 2026

Ziko was selected in the 26-man squad for the 2026 FIFA World Cup. On 21 June, he netted his first World Cup goal and provided an assist in a 3–1 victory over New Zealand. Hence, he became the first Egyptian to both score and provide an assist in the same World Cup match. After the game, he revealed that he had not expected to play at the World Cup, saying: "I was getting ready to spend my summer holidays on the north coast when I was surprised by a call from Hossam Hassan to join the national team". He also said: "I dedicate this win and this goal to my mother and my brother Abdelraouf, who has been like a father to me since our own father died. I wish he were still alive to see what I've achieved."

On 7 July, he scored a goal against Argentina in the round of 16 which was disallowed following a VAR review; the referee ruled that Marwan Attia had fouled Lisandro Martínez in the buildup by stepping on his foot, disallowing the resulting goal. Critics noted the incident occurred several seconds before the goal and far from the scoring action, though the decision was technically grounded in the IFAB rules governing the VAR protocol. The decision, and accompanying decisions in favour of Argentina, caused significant controversy. Ziko then scored a second goal which was not disallowed, helping his team take a 2–0 lead, however they eventually lost 3–2. In his post-match interview, Ziko said that "We were hard done by [the referee] today, and everyone saw that, After the 2–0 result, everything went against us and worked against us. I don't even know why the second goal was disallowed, I don't see any reason for it. He wanted to disallow the third one too, but thank God, God didn't grant him success." He also called the World Cup "rigged" in favour of Argentina and labelled the referee François Letexier "unfair".

== Style of play ==
In 2022, Ziko's former coach at Gomhoriat Shebin, Samir Kamouna, told FilGoal: "Ziko's playing style resembles that of Zamalek's Mostafa Shalaby; he excels at playing on the wing and making attacking runs into the box." His former Haras El Hodoud coach Mohamed Makki said: "He is a player with exceptional technical abilities; he excels in open play – utilising large spaces – and possesses great dribbling skills. He can beat defenders in one-on-one situations and is diligent in his defensive duties, thanks to his versatility across multiple positions." However, his former coaches suggested that he needed to improve his finishing.

Ziko has been recognised as a versatile player; in 2022 his former coach at Haras El Hodoud, Mohamed Halim, said: "Ziko is capable of playing as a number 8, a number 10, or on the wings; in terms of playing style, he is somewhat similar to Al Ahly's Taher Mohamed Taher."

== Career statistics ==
=== Club ===
As of matches played 20 May 2026 (Note: Statistics are incomplete)

Appearances and goals by club, season and competition
Club	Season	League			National cup (Note: Includes Egypt Cup)		Continental		Other		Total	
Club	Season	Division	Apps	Goals	Apps	Goals	Apps	Goals	Apps	Goals	Apps	Goals
Gomhoriat Shebin	2015–16	Egyptian Second Division	—		1	0	—		—		1	0
Haras El Hodoud	2020–21	Egyptian Premier League	—		1	0	—		—		1	0
Haras El Hodoud	2021–22	Egyptian Second Division	3	3	1	0	—		—		4	3
Haras El Hodoud	2022–23	Egyptian Premier League	32	6	—		—		—		32	7
Haras El Hodoud	Total		35	9	2	0	—		–		37	10
ZED	2023–24	Egyptian Premier League	33	12	7	1	—		—		40	13
ZED	2024–25	Egyptian Premier League	23	6	5	0	—		—		28	6
ZED	Total		56	18	12	1	—		–		68	19
Pyramids	2025–26	Egyptian Premier League	22	6	5	3	10 (Note: Appearances in CAF Champions League)	3	4 (Note: 2 appearances in Egyptian Super Cup, 2 appearances in FIFA Intercontinental Cup)	2	41	14
Career total			113	33	20	4	10	3	4	2	147	43

=== International ===
As of match played 29 September 2026

Appearances and goals by national team and year
National team	Year	Apps	Goals
Egypt	2026	9	5
Total		9	5

Scores and results list Egypt's goal tally first, score column indicates score after each Ziko goal.

List of international goals scored by Mostafa Ziko
No.	Date	Venue	Cap	Opponent	Score	Result	Competition
1	28 May 2026	Cairo International Stadium, Cairo, Egypt	1	Russia	1–0	1–0	Friendly
2	6 June 2026	Huntington Bank Field, Cleveland, United States	2	Brazil	1–1	1–2	Friendly
3	21 June 2026	BC Place, Vancouver, Canada	4	New Zealand	1–1	3–1	2026 FIFA World Cup
4	7 July 2026	Mercedes-Benz Stadium, Atlanta, United States	7	Argentina	2–0	2–3	2026 FIFA World Cup
5	29 September 2026	Juba Stadium, Juba, South Sudan	9	South Sudan	1–0	5–0	2027 Africa Cup of Nations qualification

== Honours ==
=== ZED ===
- Egypt Cup runner-up: 2023–24

=== Pyramids ===
- Egypt Cup: 2025–26
- CAF Super Cup: 2025
- FIFA African–Asian–Pacific Cup: 2025
- FIFA Challenger Cup runner-up: 2025
