= Krunoslav Jurčić =

Croatian footballer and manager

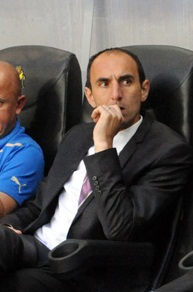
- Jurčić with Dinamo Zagreb in 2013

Personal information
- Date of birth: 26 November 1969 (age 56)
- Place of birth: Ljubuški, SR Bosnia and Herzegovina, Yugoslavia
- Height: 1.88 m (6 ft 2 in)
- Position: Defensive midfielder

Senior career*
| Years | Team | Apps | (Gls) |
| 1988–1991 | Dinamo Zagreb | 0 | (0) |
| 1991–1993 | Inker Zaprešić | 39 | (9) |
| 1993–1995 | Istra | 46 | (14) |
| 1995–1996 | Beveren | 20 | (0) |
| 1996–1999 | Dinamo Zagreb | 84 | (17) |
| 1999–2001 | Torino | 14 | (0) |
| 2001–2002 | Sampdoria | 3 | (0) |
| 2002–2004 | Slaven Belupo | 44 | (2) |
| Total | | 250 | (42) |

International career
| 1997–2000 | Croatia | 21 | (0) |
| 1999 | Croatia B | 1 | (0) |

Managerial career
- 2005–2006: Pula 1856
- 2007–2008: Slaven Belupo
- 2009–2010: Dinamo Zagreb
- 2011: Lokomotiva
- 2011: Dinamo Zagreb
- 2012: Croatia (assistant)
- 2012–2013: Dinamo Zagreb
- 2015–2016: Maribor
- 2016: Adanaspor
- 2017: Saudi Arabia
- 2018: Al Nassr (Riyadh)
- 2018–2019: Baniyas
- 2019–2021: Al-Nasr (Dubai)
- 2024–2026: Pyramids FC
- * Club domestic league appearances and goals

Krunoslav "Kruno" Jurčić (Croatian pronunciation: [krǔnoslaʋ jûːrtʃitɕ]; born 26 November 1969) is a Croatian professional football manager and former player.

== Playing career ==
=== Club ===
Jurčić started his professional career at Dinamo Zagreb in 1988, before moving to Inker Zaprešić in 1991 and Istra in 1993. He joined Belgian side Beveren in 1995, but returned to Dinamo Zagreb after one season following Beveren's relegation from the top flight. He subsequently spent three seasons with Dinamo Zagreb, also playing for them in the group stage of the UEFA Champions League in 1998. He then went on to spend three seasons in Italy with Torino and Sampdoria, before returning to Croatia by signing with Slaven Belupo in 2002. He finished his career with Slaven in 2004.

=== International ===
Jurčić made his debut for Croatia in a June 1997 Kirin Cup match against hosts Japan, coming on as a 59th-minute substitute for Nenad Pralija, and earned a total of 21 caps, scoring no goals. He played three full matches at the 1998 FIFA World Cup finals, where Croatia finished in third place. His final international was a September 2000 World Cup qualification match away against Belgium.

== Managerial career ==
Jurčić started his managerial career at Croatian First League side Pula. In his first season as head coach, Pula finished the 2005–06 season in sixth place, which was the highest ever top division placement for the club. In 2007, he was offered the head coaching position at Slaven Belupo. They finished the season in second place (best ever league position in club history) and qualified for the 2008–09 UEFA Cup. He left the club in 2008 and went on to join the reigning Croatian champions and his former club, Dinamo Zagreb, on 5 March 2009. With Dinamo he won his first managerial titles by winning the 2008–09 and 2009–10 Prva HNL and Croatian Cup in 2009. On 19 May 2010 Krunoslav Jurčić resigned as the coach of Dinamo Zagreb.

He returned to Dinamo after Vahid Halilhodžić resigned in 2011 and remained manager until December of the same year, when he was fired after Zagreb's final group game of the UEFA Champions League against Lyon, having failed to pick up any points.

After appearing as a football pundit in various sports papers and during football matches broadcasting, Jurčić was included in Igor Štimac's staff that took charge of Croatia national football team after Euro 2012. In late November 2012 Jurčić once again returned to Dinamo Zagreb, replacing sacked Ante Čačić.

On 22 August 2013, Jurčić was sacked after Dinamo Zagreb lost 2–0 at home to Austria Wien in the Europa League play-off round.

On 29 February 2016, he was sacked from Maribor after a 1–0 home defeat against Celje. Jurčić was appointed manager of Turkish club Adanaspor on 28 August 2016 on a two-year contract.

In November 2017, Jurčić signed a contract with the Saudi Arabian Football Federation to become the new head of youth player development.

In February 2018, he signed with Saudi Arabian side Al Nassr. On 28 May 2018, he was named the head coach of Baniyas Club.

In October 2019, Jurčić moved back to the UAE where he was appointed as the head coach of Al-Nasr. In February 2021, Jurčić left Al Nasr despite winning the UAE League Cup, due to mediocre results in the league.

In February 2024, Jurčić was appointed head coach of Egyptian Premier League side Pyramids FC. He quickly made an impact by guiding the club to their first-ever domestic title with a 1–0 victory over ZED in the Egypt Cup final. In the 2024–25 season, Jurčić led Pyramids FC to the Champions League final and secured the club's first-ever continental triumph, defeating Mamelodi Sundowns 3–2 on aggregate.

== Career statistics ==
=== Managerial statistics ===
As of match played 28 April 2026

| Team | From | To | Record | | | | |
| Team | From | To | G | W | D | L | Win % |
|---|---|---|---|---|---|---|---|
| Pula | 2005 | 2006 | 25 | 9 | 7 | 9 | 36.00 |
| Slaven Belupo | 4 June 2007 | 15 May 2008 | 41 | 19 | 7 | 15 | 46.34 |
| Dinamo Zagreb | 5 March 2009 | 19 May 2010 | 64 | 38 | 13 | 13 | 59.38 |
| Lokomotiva Zagreb | 14 March 2011 | 26 May 2011 | 9 | 2 | 4 | 3 | 22.22 |
| Dinamo Zagreb | 26 May 2011 | 7 December 2011 | 31 | 19 | 5 | 7 | 61.29 |
| Dinamo Zagreb | 26 November 2012 | 22 August 2013 | 30 | 21 | 7 | 2 | 70.00 |
| Maribor | 29 August 2015 | 29 February 2016 | 18 | 11 | 4 | 3 | 61.11 |
| Adanaspor | 28 August 2016 | 5 December 2016 | 12 | 1 | 2 | 9 | 8.33 |
| Saudi Arabia | November 2017 | 28 December 2017 | 3 | 1 | 1 | 1 | 33.33 |
| Al Nassr | 1 February 2018 | 13 April 2018 | 9 | 5 | 2 | 2 | 55.56 |
| Baniyas | 28 May 2018 | 28 May 2019 | 35 | 14 | 10 | 11 | 40.00 |
| Al-Nasr | 14 October 2019 | 3 February 2021 | 40 | 21 | 10 | 9 | 52.50 |
| Pyramids FC | 7 February 2024 | present | 131 | 83 | 27 | 21 | 63.36 |
| Total | | | 448 | 244 | 99 | 105 | 54.46 |

== Honours ==
=== Player ===
- Inter Zaprešić
  - Croatian Cup: 1992
- Dinamo Zagreb
  - Croatian First League: 1996–97, 1997–98, 1998–99, 1999–2000
  - Croatian Cup: 1997, 1998

=== Manager ===
- Dinamo Zagreb
  - Croatian First League: 2008–09, 2009–10, 2012–13
  - Croatian Cup: 2009
  - Croatian Supercup: 2013
- Al Nasr
  - Emirati League Cup: 2019–20
- Pyramids
  - Egypt Cup: 2023–24, 2025–26
  - CAF Champions League: 2024–25
  - CAF Super Cup: 2025
  - FIFA African–Asian–Pacific Cup :2025

=== Orders ===
- Order of Danica Hrvatska with face of Franjo Bučar – 1995
- Order of the Croatian Trefoil – 1998
