= Mostafa El Aash =

Egyptian footballer (born 2000)

Personal information
- Full name: Mostafa Mahmoud Abdelkader El Aash
- Date of birth: 11 October 2000 (age 26)
- Place of birth: Kom Hamada, Beheira, Egypt
- Height: 1.82 m (6 ft 0 in)
- Positions: Centre-back; left-back

Team information
- Current team: Al Masry SC
- Number: 23

Youth career
- YC Kom Hamada

Senior career*
Years	Team	Apps	(Gls)
2021–2023	Ghazl El Mahalla	56	(1)
2023–2025	Zed FC	39	(0)
2025–	→ Al Ahly (loan)	11	(0)
2025–2026	Al Ahly	4	(0)
2025-	Al Masry SC	11	(0)
- * Club domestic league appearances and goals as of 03 August 2026

Mostafa Mahmoud Abdelkader El Aash (Arabic: مصطفى العش; born 11 October 2000) is an Egyptian professional footballer who plays as a centre-back for Egyptian Premier League club Al Masry SC.

== Club career ==
=== Ghazl El Mahalla ===
El‑Aash began his journey in football with Shabab Kom Hamada in Egypt's Third Division. His performances in the 2020–21 season attracted Ghazl El Mahalla SC, who secured his transfer for EGP 300,000, with a 15% resale clause. Demonstrating his capabilities as a commanding defender, he quickly became a standout performer for the team, despite difficult campaigns in the Egyptian Premier League, earning widespread recognition and attracting attention from top-tier clubs. On 7 June 2023, he scored his first league goal in a 1–1 draw against Al Masry.

=== ZED ===
In ِ September 2023, El Aash transferred to ZED FC in a notable deal reportedly worth EGP 20 million payable to Ghazl El Mahalla. His development continued impressively at ZED, where he made 49 appearances across all competitions. While he didn't register any goals or assists, his defensive consistency and versatility—able to operate both centrally and as a left-back—drawn praise from scouts and coaches alike.

=== Al Ahly ===
In January 2025, Al Ahly secured El‑Aash services initially on loan. On 10 June 2025, Al Ahly finalized the transfer permanently, signing El‑Aash to a four‑year contract, with the transfer fee estimated to be EGP 60 million.

== Career statistics ==
=== Club ===
As of 28 May 2025

Club	Season	League			Cup		Continental		Other		Total	
Club	Season	Division	Apps	Goals	Apps	Goals	Apps	Goals	Apps	Goals	Apps	Goals
Ghazl El Mahalla	2021–22	EPL	23	0	1	0	—		1 (Note: Appearances in Egyptian League Cup)	0	25	0
Ghazl El Mahalla	2022–23	EPL	33	1	0	0	—		1	0	34	1
Ghazl El Mahalla	Total		56	1	1	0	0	0	2	0	59	1
ZED FC	2023–24	EPL	31	0	4	0	—		2	0	37	0
ZED FC	2024–25	EPL	8	0	0	0	—		0	0	8	0
ZED FC	Total		39	0	4	0	0	0	2	0	45	0
Al Ahly (loan)	2024–25	EPL	11	0	0	0	2 (Note: Appearances in CAF Champions League)	0	0	0	13	0
Al Ahly (loan)	Total		11	0	0	0	2	0	0	0	13	0
Career Total			106	1	5	0	2	0	4	0	117	1

== Honours ==
Al Ahly

- Egyptian Premier League: 2024–25
