= 2022 Egypt Cup final =

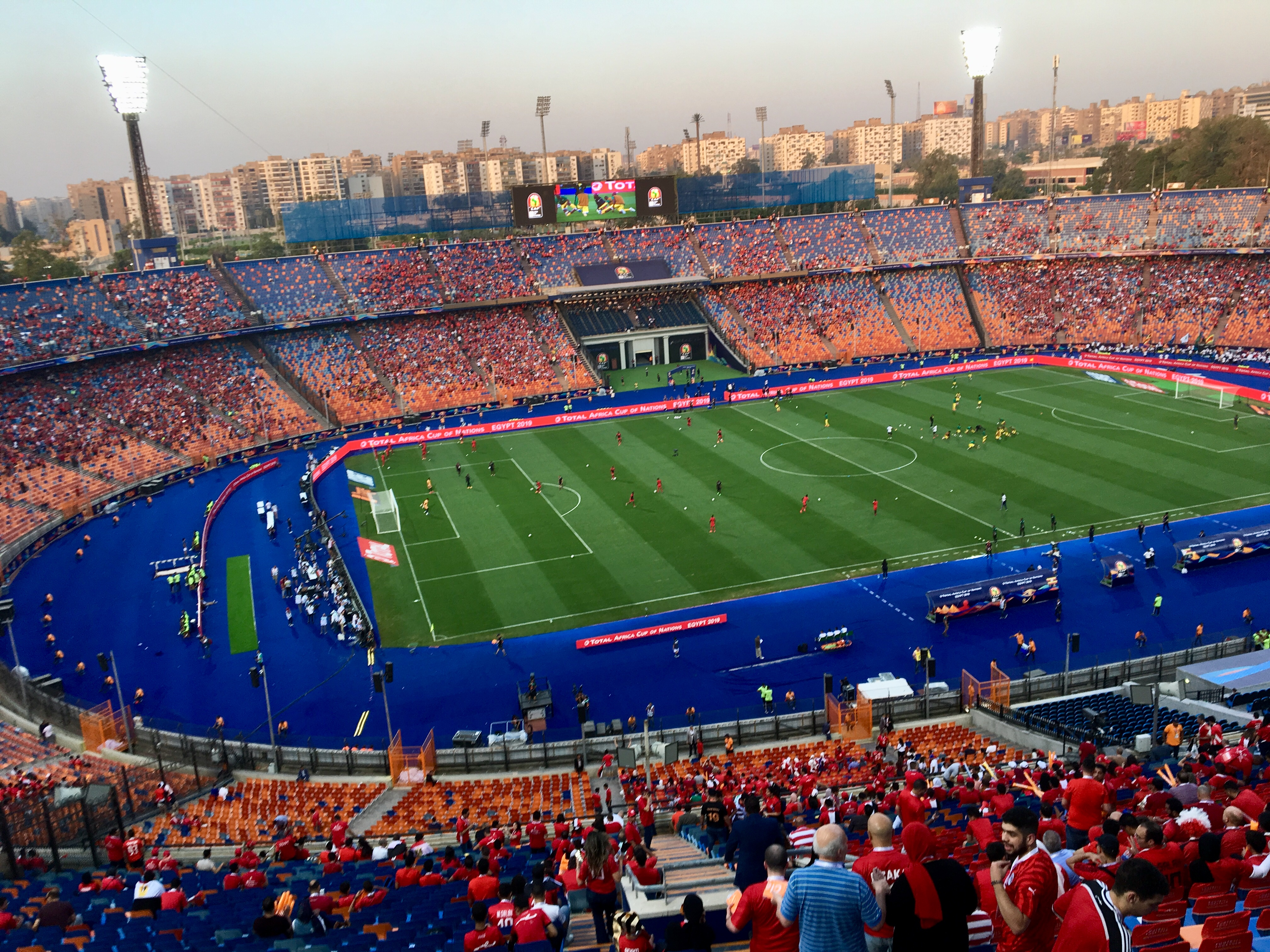
- Event: 2021–22 Egypt Cup
Al Ahly	Pyramids
2	1
- After extra time
- Date: 10 April 2023
- Venue: Cairo International Stadium, Cairo
- Referee: Amin Omar

The 2022 Egypt Cup final was a football match to decide the winner of the 2021–22 Egypt Cup, the 90th season of the Egypt Cup. It was scheduled to take place on 3 February 2023 at the Cairo International Stadium, but it was postponed due to Al Ahly's participation in the FIFA Club World Cup. Due to safety concerns a maximum of 20,000 spectators was allowed in the stands.

== Route to the final ==
Al Ahly		Round	Pyramids
Opponent	Result	2021–22 Egypt Cup	Opponent	Result
Al Masry Sallum	1–0	Round of 32	La Viena	1–0
Misr Lel Makkasa	1–0	Round of 16	Ceramica Cleopatra	2–1
Al Mokawloon Al Arab	1–1 (a.e.t.) (4–3 p)	Quarter-finals	National Bank	1–0
Smouha	3–1	Semi-finals	Zamalek	1–1 (a.e.t.) (4–3 p)

== Match ==
=== Details ===
10 April 2023
21:15 EST (UTC+2)

Al Ahly	2–1 (a.e.t.)	Pyramids
Kahraba 74'; Fathy 105'		El Karti 71'

Cairo International Stadium, Cairo
Referee: Amin Omar

Al Ahly	Pyramids

GK	1	(Egypt) Mohamed El Shenawy (c)
RB	30	(Egypt) Mohamed Hany
CB	5	(Egypt) Ramy Rabia		(substituted off) 23'
CB	24	(Egypt) Mohamed Abdelmonem	(yellow card) 74' (red card) 117'
LB	21	(Tunisia) Ali Maâloul
CM	8	(Egypt) Hamdy Fathy	(yellow card) 85'
CM	13	(Egypt) Marwan Attia
AM	17	(Egypt) Amr El Solia		(substituted off) 59'
RW	23	(South Africa) Percy Tau		(substituted off) 105'
LW	14	(Egypt) Hussein El Shahat	(yellow card) 47'	(substituted off) 120'
CF	7	(Egypt) Kahraba		(substituted off) 105'
Substitutes:
GK	16	(Egypt) Ali Lotfi
DF	2	(Egypt) Khaled Abdelfattah		(substituted in) 120'
DF	6	(Egypt) Yasser Ibrahim		(substituted in) 23'
MF	15	(Mali) Aliou Dieng		(substituted in) 105'
MF	19	(Egypt) Afsha		(substituted in) 59'
FW	11	(Brazil) Bruno Sávio
FW	10	(Egypt) Mohamed Sherif		(substituted in) 105'
FW	20	(Egypt) Shady Hussein
MF	26	(Algeria) Ahmed Kendouci
Manager:
(Switzerland) Marcel Koller

GK	1	(Egypt) Ahmed El Shenawy (c)
RB	21	(Egypt) Mohamed Hamdy
CB	4	(Egypt) Ahmed Samy	(yellow card) 74'
CB	12	(Egypt) Ahmed Tawfik	(yellow card) 104'
LB	6	(Egypt) Osama Galal		(substituted off) 66'
CM	18	(Morocco) Walid El Karti
CM	7	(Burkina Faso) Blati Touré	(yellow card) 28'	(substituted off) 118'
LW	10	(Egypt) Ramadan Sobhi
RW	15	(Morocco) Mohamed Chibi	(yellow card) 101'	(substituted off) 105'
AM	19	(Egypt) Abdallah El Said		(substituted off) 46'
CF	30	(Egypt) Ibrahim Adel	(yellow card) 45+2'	(substituted off) 82'
Substitutes:
GK	25	(Egypt) Ahmed Daador
DF	24	(Egypt) Ahmed Fathy
DF	29	(Egypt) Karim Hafez		(substituted in) 66'
MF	13	(Egypt) Mahmoud Abdel Aati
MF	8	(Egypt) Islam Issa	(yellow card) 80'	(substituted in) 46'
MF	17	(Egypt) Hesham Mohamed
FW	23	(South Africa) Fagrie Lakay		(substituted in) 82'
FW	26	(Egypt) Mohamed El Gabbas		(substituted in) 118'
FW	28	(Tunisia) Fakhreddine Ben Youssef		(substituted in) 105'
Manager:
(Portugal) Jaime Pacheco
