= York Rafael =

Rwandan footballer

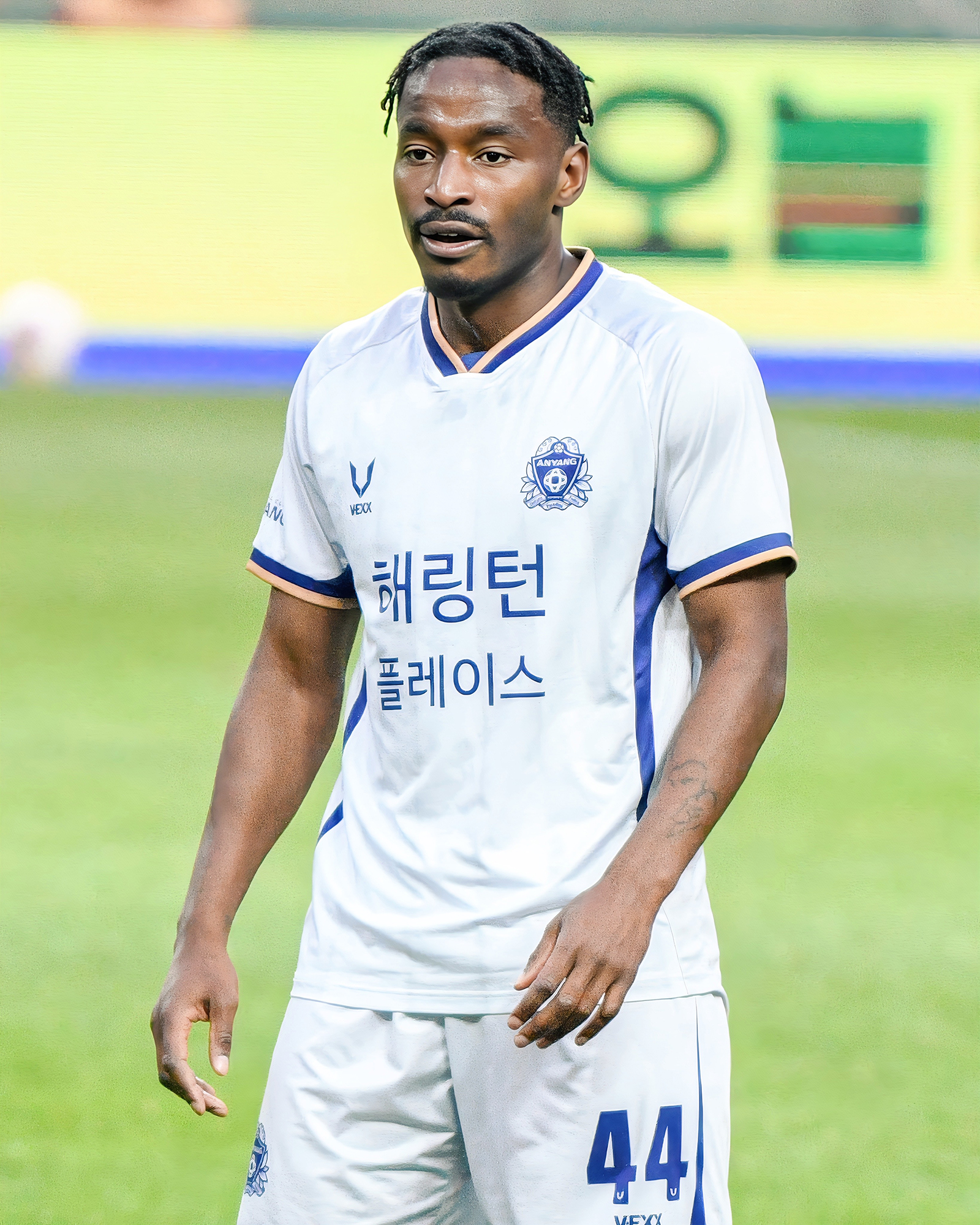

Personal information
- Full name: Rafael in 2026
- Date of birth: 17 March 1999 (age 27)
- Place of birth: Gävle, Sweden
- Position: Left midfielder

Team information
- Current team: Brage
- Number: 16

Youth career
- 2011–2013: Brynäs IF
- 2013–2014: Sandvikens IF

Senior career*
Years	Team	Apps	(Gls)
2014–2018	Sandvikens IF	38	(6)
2016	→ Gefle IF (loan)	1	(0)
2017	→ VfL Bochum (loan)	0	(0)
2018–2019	IFK Värnamo	7	(0)
2018	→ Sandvikens IF (loan)	17	(2)
2019–2021	Kalmar FF	37	(0)
2021–2022	AFC Eskilstuna	53	(8)
2023–2024	Gefle IF	44	(1)
2025	ZED	1	(0)
2025	Oddevold	12	(0)
2026	FC Anyang	6	(0)
2026–	Brage	7	(1)

International career^{‡}
2015–2016	Sweden U17	6	(0)
2016–2019	Sweden U19	11	(1)
2021–	Rwanda	8	(0)
- * Club domestic league appearances and goals as of 12 November 2026 ‡ National team caps and goals as of 1 April 2024

York Rafael (born 17 March 1999) is a professional footballer who plays for Brage, primarily as a left midfielder. Born in Sweden, he represents the Rwanda national team.

== Club career ==
York Rafael started his football career with Gävle side Brynäs IF in 2011. He joined Sandvikens IF's youth academy two years later and made his senior debut with them as a 15-year-old in Division 2. In 2015 Rafael went on trials with European clubs Watford and Lazio, as well with Swedish IFK Göteborg the previous year, without signing any contracts.

While being linked with a move to AIK, Rafael instead joined Allsvenskan club Gefle IF on loan in August 2016. He made his Gefle debut in Svenska Cupen, playing 90 minutes against Söderhamns FF on August 24. It was followed up with his Allsvenskan debut three days later against Djurgårdens IF, in which he came on as a substitute in the final minutes of the game.

On 11 December 2017, he joined IFK Värnamo in Superettan, Sweden's second tier. During the 2018 season, York returned to his old club Sandvikens IF on loan. On 11 December 2018, Kalmar FF announced, that they had signed Rafael on a deal until the end of 2021.

== International career ==
He won his first youth international cup for Sweden U17 on 4 August 2015, in Sweden's 3–0 win against Iceland. He played six games in total for U17, for which he is still eligible to play for, until he was called up to Sweden's U19 squad in September 2016. He has scored one goal in three games so far.

Due to his dual citizenship with Rwanda, he was invited to play for Rwanda national football team in 2015. He debuted with Rwanda in a 1–0 2022 FIFA World Cup qualification loss to Uganda on 7 October 2021.

== Personal life ==
Rafael was raised in Gävle, Sweden, to an Angolan father and Rwandese mother. He is a practicing Christian.

He cited Arjen Robben as his idol.

== Career statistics ==
=== Club ===
As of 21 October 2016

Club	Season	League			Cup		Continental		Total	
Club	Season	Division	Apps	Goals	Apps	Goals	Apps	Goals	Apps	Goals
Gefle IF	2016	Allsvenskan	1	0	1	0	—		2	0
Gefle IF	Total		1	0	1	0	0	0	2	0
Career total			1	0	1	0	0	0	2	0
