= FilGoal =

Egyptian website

FilGoal Logo

FilGoal.com (In the Goal) is an Egyptian sports website, owned and managed by Sarmady, a subsidiary of Vodafone Egypt. FilGoal's main scope is football news.

== Coverage ==
FilGoal covers the Egyptian, Saudi Professional League and European leagues, as well as the UEFA Champions League, Africa Cup of Nations, the FIFA World Cup and other international competitions.

The website provides over 20 news pieces a day alongside opinion pieces and interviews with both players and coaches. With services ranging from streaming web radio commentary and analysis, visitors' own analysis section, match previews and reviews.

== Language ==
FilGoal.com is published in Arabic and English. The first version of FilGoal logo was created in 2001 by Mostafa Farahat.

== See also ==
- Footytube
- Football 360
