= Footytube =

Online football (soccer) community

- Website type: Football Video & News Aggregator
- Available in: English
- Founded: July 2006
- Headquarters: Valletta, Malta
- Area served: Worldwide
- Owner: Independent
- Founders: Ben Tarek, Lee Smith, Matt Jackson
- Key people: Ben Tarek, Lee Smith, Matt Jackson, Vlad Bosinceanu, Araz Heydariyehzadeh
- Website: www.footytube.com
- Registration: Optional (required to comment and rate videos)
- Launched: 24 July 2006
- Current status: Not Active

Footytube was a football video community. The website attracted over 1.4 million unique monthly users, with around 16m pageviews. and was listed in Alexa as being the 18th most visited football site in the world in 2010.

The site used to aggregate vast amounts of football data and present it in a contextualized fashion to the user, covering everything from the latest highlights to fan made content, player interviews and club podcasts. The site also had a wide-ranging set of community features geared towards the football enthusiast. Users used to be able to create profiles and compete in the footytube fan valuation, fantasy football and fan trait leagues. As of 2019, the site has been permanently offline.

== Recognition ==
Footytube appeared in The Daily Telegraph newspaper's Top 25 Football Websites in 2009 and was also a featured site in The Guardian's "Guide" and "Things we like this week" sections. The website also featured in The Guardian's open platform gallery.

Footytube was mentioned in tweets by sporting celebrities and football journalists, including Tim Lovejoy, who described the site as a "Footie Fans Heaven".

== History ==
Footytube was founded in July 2006 in what initially began as a WordPress blog showcasing the latest football videos from around the world. The blog quickly grew in popularity with supporters, and before long was attracting upwards of 100,000 unique visitors per month. In early 2007, footytube was acquired by Lee Smith and Matthew Jackson, two web developers and internet entrepreneurs with a passion for football.
