= Maged Hany =

Egyptian footballer (born 2003)

Personal information
- Full name: Maged Ali Abdel Rahman Hany
- Date of birth: 1 April 2003 (age 23)
- Position: Midfielder

Team information
- Current team: Zamalek
- Number: 44

Youth career
- –2022: Zamalek

Senior career*
Years	Team	Apps	(Gls)
2022–	Zamalek	1	(0)

International career^{‡}
2023–	Egypt U20	3	(0)
- * Club domestic league appearances and goals as of 23:06, 25 February 2023 (UTC) ‡ National team caps and goals as of 23:06, 25 February 2023 (UTC)

Maged Ali Abdel Rahman Hany (Arabic: ماجد هاني; born 1 April 2003) is a football midfielder who plays for Egyptian Premier League club Zamalek.
