= Tarek Alaa (footballer, born 2002) =

Egyptian footballer (born 2002)

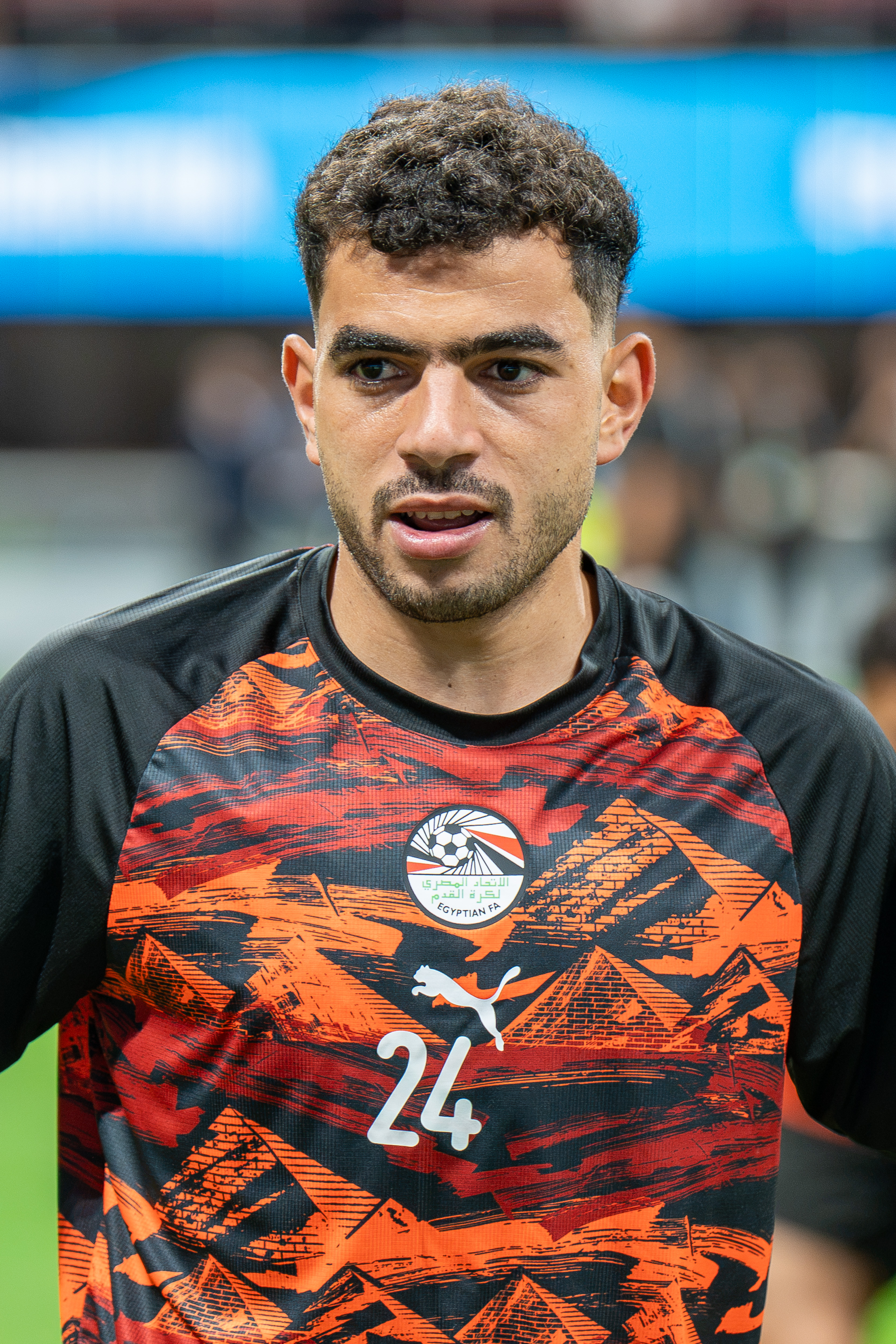
- Alaa with Egypt in 2026

Personal information
- Full name: Tarek Alaa Abdelghaffar Elgebaly
- Date of birth: 5 January 2002 (age 24)
- Place of birth: Cairo, Egypt
- Height: 1.78 m (5 ft 10 in)
- Position: Right-back

Team information
- Current team: ZED (on loan from Pyramids)
- Number: 23

Youth career
- –2022: Smouha

Senior career*
| Years | Team | Apps | (Gls) |
| 2022–2024 | Smouha | 33 | (0) |
| 2024– | Pyramids | 5 | (0) |
| 2026– | → ZED (loan) | 12 | (0) |

International career^{‡}
| 2026– | Egypt | 2 | (0) |
- * Club domestic league appearances and goals as of 08:41, 30 May 2026 (UTC) ‡ National team caps and goals as of 08:41, 30 May 2026 (UTC)

Tarek Alaa Abdelghaffar Elgebaly (Note: Arabic: طارق علاء عبد الغفار الجبالي) born 5 January 2002) is an Egyptian footballer who plays as a right-back for Egyptian Premier League club ZED, on loan from Pyramids, and the Egypt national team.

== Club career ==
Alaa began his career with Smouha, and was promoted to the first team in the Egyptian Premier League during the 2022–23 season. In September 2024, Alaa joined fellow Premier League club Pyramids. In February 2026, Alaa was loaned to ZED for the remainder of the season.

== International career ==
Alaa was called up to the Egypt national team for the first time in March 2026. He made his debut on 27 March in a friendly match against Saudi Arabia, coming on as a substitute in the 76th minute of a 4–0 win. On 29 May, Alaa was included in Egypt's final squad for the 2026 FIFA World Cup.

== Career statistics ==
=== International ===
As of match played 28 May 2026

Appearances and goals by national team and year
| National team | Year | Apps | Goals |
|---|---|---|---|
| Egypt | 2026 | 2 | 0 |
| Total | | 2 | 0 |
