= Rafaat Khalil =

Egyptian footballer (born 2004)

Personal information
- Full name: Rafaat Khalil Abdelkader Bayoumi
- Date of birth: 3 February 2004 (age 22)
- Height: 1.69 m (5 ft 7 in)
- Position: Winger

Team information
- Current team: ZED
- Number: 32

Youth career
- –2022: Al Ahly

Senior career*
| Years | Team | Apps | (Gls) |
| 2022–2024 | Al Ahly | 10 | (1) |
| 2023–2024 | → ZED (loan) | 23 | (3) |
| 2024– | ZED | 0 | (0) |

International career^{‡}
| 2023– | Egypt U20 | 3 | (0) |
| 2023– | Egypt U23 | 1 | (0) |
- * Club domestic league appearances and goals ‡ National team caps and goals as of 7 September 2023

Rafaat Khalil Abdelkader Bayoumi (Arabic: رأفت خليل; born 3 February 2004) is an Egyptian professional footballer who plays as a winger for Egyptian Premier League club ZED, and the Egypt U20.

== Honours and achievements ==
Al Ahly

- CAF Champions League:2022–23
- Egyptian Premier League:2022–23
- Egypt Cup: 2021–22, 2022–23
