= Mohamed Ashraf (footballer, born 2001) =

Egyptian footballer (born 2001)

Personal information
- Full name: Mohamed Ashraf Mohamed Bakry Mohamed
- Date of birth: 1 October 2001 (age 25)
- Place of birth: Sharqia, Egypt
- Height: 1.79 m (5 ft 10 in)
- Positions: Left-back; left midfielder

Team information
- Current team: Zed FC
- Number: 21

Youth career
- Al Ahly

Senior career*
| Years | Team | Apps | (Gls) |
| 2022–2024 | Al Ahly | 18 | (0) |
| 2023–2024 | → Zed FC (loan) | 13 | (0) |
| 2024– | Zed FC | | |

International career
| 2019–2021 | Egypt U20 | 9 | (0) |
| 2023- | Egypt U23 | 5 | (0) |
Medal record
Representing Egypt
U-23 Africa Cup of Nations
| Runner-up | Morocco 2023 | U-23 Team |
- * Club domestic league appearances and goals

Mohamed Ashraf Mohamed Bakry Mohamed (Arabic: مُحَمَّد أَشْرَف مُحَمَّد بَكْرِيّ مُحَمَّد; born 1 October 2001) is an Egyptian professional footballer who plays as a left-back for Egyptian Premier League club ZED and the Egypt U23.

== Honours and achievements ==
Al Ahly

- CAF Champions League:2022–23
- Egyptian Premier League:2022–23
- Egypt Cup: 2021–22
