= Mostafa Saad =

Egyptian footballer (born 2001)

Personal information
- Full name: Mostafa Saad Abdallah Sayed Ahmed
- Date of birth: 22 August 2001 (age 25)
- Height: 1.68 m (5 ft 6 in)
- Position: Right winger

Team information
- Current team: ZED
- Number: 80

Youth career
- Ceramica Cleopatra

Senior career*
Years	Team	Apps	(Gls)
2020–2022	Ceramica Cleopatra	39	(3)
2022–2023	Al Ahly	2	(0)
2023–2023	→ Smouha (loan)	18	(2)
2023–	ZED	25	(3)

International career^{‡}
- Egypt U23
2023–	Egypt	15	(1)
Medal record
Representing Egypt
U-23 Africa Cup of Nations
Runner-up	Morocco 2023	U-23 Team
- * Club domestic league appearances and goals ‡ National team caps and goals as of 9 September 2025

Mostafa Saad Abdallah Sayed Ahmed (Arabic: مُصْطَفَى سَعْد عَبْد الله سَيِّد أَحْمَد; born 22 August 2001), also known as Mostafa Saad Messi, is an Egyptian professional footballer who plays as a right winger for Egyptian Premier League club ZED.

== Club career ==
In September 2022, Saad signed for Al Ahly on a five-year deal. He suffered an injury shortly after joining Al Ahly, keeping him out for three weeks and disrupting his integration into the first team. Despite this injury, manager Marcel Koller promised Saad in November 2022 that he would receive more game time.

In January 2023, Saad asked to leave Al Ahly on loan, due to a lack of playing time, with a number of Egyptian Premier League sides interested, including former club Ceramica Cleopatra. He was eventually loaned to Smouha, thanking manager Ahmed Samy for giving him his debut against ENPPI, despite not yet having trained with the squad.

== International career ==
Saad has represented Egypt at under-23 level.

== Style of play ==
Saad is nicknamed Messi after Argentine playmaker Lionel Messi, due to the two sharing a similar stature and style of play.

== Career statistics ==
=== Club ===
As of 9 March 2023.

Appearances and goals by club, season and competition
Club	Season	League			Cup		Continental		Other		Total	
Club	Season	Division	Apps	Goals	Apps	Goals	Apps	Goals	Apps	Goals	Apps	Goals
Ceramica Cleopatra	2020–21	Egyptian Premier League	7	1	1 (Note: Appearances in the Egypt Cup)	0	–		0	0	8	1
Ceramica Cleopatra	2021–22	Egyptian Premier League	32	2	1	0	–		0	0	33	2
Ceramica Cleopatra	Total		39	3	2	0	0	0	0	0	41	3
Al Ahly	2022–23	Egyptian Premier League	2	0	0	0	0	0	0	0	2	0
Smouha (loan)	2022–23	Egyptian Premier League	5	1	0	0	–		0	0	5	1
Career total			46	4	2	0	0	0	0	0	48	4

=== International ===
As of match played 9 September 2025

Appearances and goals by year
National team	Year	Apps	Goals
Egypt	2023	8	0
Egypt	2024	6	0
Egypt	2025	1	1
Total		15	1

Scores and results list Egypt's goal tally first, score column indicates score after each Saad goal.

List of international goals scored by Mostafa Saad
No.	Date	Venue	Opponent	Score	Result	Competition
1	9 September 2025	Ismailia Stadium, Ismailia, Egypt	Tunisia	2–0	3–0	Friendly

== Honours ==
Al Ahly

- Egyptian Premier League: 2022–23
- Egypt Cup: 2021–22
