= Mahmoud Saber =

Egyptian footballer (born 2001)

- Saber with Egypt in 2026

Personal information
- Full name: Mohamed Saber Abdelmohsen Hassan Abdelmohsen
- Date of birth: 30 July 2001 (age 25)
- Place of birth: Egypt
- Height: 1.70 m (5 ft 7 in)
- Position: Central midfielder

Team information
- Current team: Pyramids
- Number: 8

Youth career
- 20??–2018: Nogoom

Senior career*
Years	Team	Apps	(Gls)
2018–2020	Nogoom	2	(0)
2020–	Pyramids	44	(6)
2023–2024	→ ZED (loan)	8	(1)
2025–2026	→ ZED (loan)	26	(5)

International career^{‡}
2023–2024	Egypt Olympic	19	(6)
2024–	Egypt	17	(2)
- * Club domestic league appearances and goals as of 09 August 2026 ‡ National team caps and goals as of 3 July 2026

Mahmoud Saber Abdelmohsen Hassan Abdelmohsen (Note: Arabic: محمود صابر عبد المحسن حسن عبد المحسن) (born 30 July 2001) is an Egyptian professional footballer who plays as a central midfielder for Egyptian Premier League club Pyramids and the Egypt national team.

== Club career ==
Saber started playing football in Nogoom, where he made his debut in the Egyptian Premier League on 22 May 2019 in a 2–0 loss to Pyramids. In November 2020, he went on loan to Pyramids, and at the end of the season, he was purchased permanently. He scored his first goal on 25 August 2023 against Misr Lel Makkasa.

In 2023, Saber was loaned to ZED, but after just six months he returned to Pyramids.

== International career ==
Saber was included in the Egyptian U-23 squad for the Olympic Games.

On 2 December 2025, Saber was called up to the Egypt squad for the 2025 Africa Cup of Nations. Half a year later, on 26 June 2026, he scored his first international goal in the fifth minute of a 1–1 draw with Iran at the 2026 FIFA World Cup, recording his country's fastest-ever goal at the tournament.

== Career statistics ==
=== International ===
As of match played 3 July 2026

Appearances and goals by national team and year
National team	Year	Apps	Goals
Egypt	2024	3	0
Egypt	2025	8	1
Egypt	2026	6	1
Total		17	2

Scores and results list Egypt's goal tally first, score column indicates score after each Saber goal.

List of international goals scored by Mahmoud Saber
No.	Date	Venue	Cap	Opponent	Score	Result	Competition
1	16 December 2025	Cairo International Stadium, Cairo, Egypt	10	Nigeria	1–0	2–1	Friendly
2	26 June 2026	Lumen Field, Seattle, United States	16	Iran	1–0	1–1	2026 FIFA World Cup
