= Shady Hussein =

Egyptian association football player (born 1993)

Personal information
- Date of birth: 1 May 1993 (age 33)
- Place of birth: Cairo, Egypt
- Positions: Forward; winger

Team information
- Current team: ZED FC
- Number: 9

Youth career
- –2014: Al Mokawloon Al Arab

Senior career*
Years	Team	Apps	(Gls)
2014–2022	Ceramica Cleopatra		
2022–2023	Al Ahly	14	(1)
2023–	ZED FC	26	(9)
- * Club domestic league appearances and goals

Shady Hussien (Arabic: شادي حسين; born 1 May 1993) is an Egyptian professional footballer who plays as a forward for Egyptian League club ZED FC.

== Club career ==
On 12 September Al Ahly announced the signing of Shady from Ceramica Cleopatra on five years deal.

== Honours ==
Al Ahly

- Egyptian Premier League: 2022–23
- Egyptian Super Cup: 2021–22, 2022–23
- Egypt Cup: 2021–22
- CAF Champions League: 2022–23
