= ZED FC =

Association football club in Giza, Egypt

ZED
- Full name: ZED Football Club نادي زد لكرة القدم
- Short name: ZED
- Founded: 1 November 2009; 16 years ago as FC Masr; 24 November 2020; 5 years ago as ZED FC
- Ground: Cairo International Stadium
- Capacity: 75,000
- Chairman: Onsi Sawiris II
- Manager: Mohamed Shawky
- League: Egyptian Premier League
Home colours	Away colours

ZED Football Club (Arabic: نادي زد لكرة القدم), formerly known as FC Masr, is an Egyptian professional football club based in Giza. The club currently plays in the Egyptian Premier League, the highest tier in the Egyptian football league system.

The club was known as FC Masr since its establishment in 2009 until 24 November 2020, when ZED Egypt acquired the club and renamed it to ZED FC prior to the start of the 2020–21 season in Egypt. They previously played in the Egyptian Premier League only once during the 2019–20 season under the name of FC Masr; their last season under that name.

== History ==
=== 2009–2014: Founding and time in lower leagues ===
FC Masr logo from 2016 to 2020. The club used two other variants of the logo in 2009–2013 and 2013–2016.

On 1 November 2009, Egyptian football management company Masr for Football SAE announced the establishment of the club, with the aim of becoming a leading football club in Egypt concentrating on the youth system. As the 2009–10 season in Egyptian football had already started before November, the club couldn't participate in the lowest league in the Egyptian football league system and was available to enter the Egyptian Fourth Division from the next season. However, FC Masr registered for the league for the 2011–12 season, almost two years after the club was officially founded. Since the Egyptian Fourth Division is a regional league, FC Masr were placed into a group for teams from Cairo.

FC Masr enjoyed a good start to their first-ever season and were close to secure a place in the promotion play-offs, however all football related activities in Egypt were suspended (later abandoned) by the Egyptian Football Association after the Port Said Stadium riot occurred in February 2012 following a 2011–12 Egyptian Premier League match between Al Masry and Al Ahly, which resulted in the death of 74 attendants. In the following season, the club competed in the same group and again finished first, earning themselves this time an immediate promotion to the Egyptian Third Division.

In the Third Division, and similar to the lowest league, FC Masr entered a group for teams from Cairo, Giza, El Monufia and other nearby governorates. The club qualified to the next round of the league, known as the Promotion Groups where teams are divided into groups of 6 teams per group, after leading their regional group. In the Promotion Groups, they succeeded in earning promotion to the Egyptian Second Division for the first time in their history; earning back-to-back promotions from the lowest league to the second-tier league in the league system in only two years.

In November 2020, the club was renamed to ZED FC after the club was purchased by ZED Sports. The new ownership structure implemented former captain Osama Nabieh as manager.

ZED FC's academy won the "Best Academy in Africa", as well as the "Best Middle East Academy" awards at the 2021 and 2023 Globe Soccer Awards respectively.

In December 2021, the club announced a partnership with English Premier League club Aston Villa (which is part-owned by ZED FC owner Naguib Sawiris' brother Nassef Sawiris) to allow young players from their academy to play in Europe. In April 2023, this partnership was expanded and formalised as ZED FC became part of a three-way collaboration with Aston Villa and another part of Nassef Sawiris' V Sports group, Portuguese Primeira Liga club Vitória. The partnership was further expanded in October 2023 with the addition of Japanese J1 League club Vissel Kobe.

After finishing top of Group B in the 2022/2023 Season, ZED FC was promoted to the Egyptian Premier League where it finished in 7th position in the 2023/2024 season. In the 2023/2024 season, ZED FC finished in 2nd place of the Egyptian Cup, after losing the 1-0 in the final.

== Kit manufacturers and shirt sponsors ==
Period	Kit manufacturer	Shirt sponsor
2011–2015	(Italy) Diadora	None
2015–2020	(Italy) Macron	None
2020–2021	(United States) Nike	None
2021–2022	(United States) Nike	WE
2022–	(England) Umbro	WE

== Recent seasons ==
The recent season-by-season performance of the club:

Season	Division	Position
2012–13	Egyptian Fourth Division	1st ↑
2013–14	Egyptian Third Division	1st ↑
2014–15	Egyptian Second Division	4th (Group C)
2015–16	Egyptian Second Division	2nd (Group C)
2016–17	Egyptian Second Division	2nd (Group B)
2017–18	Egyptian Second Division	4th (Group B)
2018–19	Egyptian Second Division	1st (Group B) ↑
2019–20	Egyptian Premier League	18th ↓
2020–21	Egyptian Second Division	9th (Group B)
2021–22	Egyptian Second Division	4th (Group B)
2022–23	Egyptian Second Division	1st (Group B) ↑
2023–24	Egyptian Premier League	7th

== Players ==
=== Current squad ===
As of 22 September 2026

Note: Flags indicate national team as defined under FIFA eligibility rules; some limited exceptions apply. Players may hold more than one non-FIFA nationality.

No.	Pos.	Nation	Player
1	GK	EGY	Ali Lotfi
2	DF	EGY	Mohamed Hussein
3	DF	EGY	Abdallah Bakri
4	DF	EGY	Ahmed Castelo
5	DF	EGY	Ahmed Tarek
7	FW	EGY	Rafaat Khalil
8	DF	EGY	Ahmed Sayed
9	FW	EGY	Ahmed Atef
10	FW	EGY	Mostafa Saad
11	MF	EGY	Abdel Rahman El Banouby
12	MF	EGY	Maged Hany
13	DF	SLE	Amara Keita
14	FW	EGY	Ahmed Adel
15	DF	EGY	Sameh Ibrahim
16	GK	EGY	Mohammed Mazzika
17	FW	LBR	Mamadou Bah
18	FW	EGY	Ahmed El Saghiri
19	MF	EGY	Mohamed Ezz

No.	Pos.	Nation	Player
20	MF	EGY	Hamdy Alaa
21	DF	EGY	Mohamed Ashraf
22	MF	EGY	Mahmoud Bolbol
23	DF	EGY	Tarek Alaa
24	DF	EGY	Abdo Gouda
26	DF	EGY	Mohamed Rabia
29	FW	NGR	Rasheed Ahmed
30	MF	EGY	Walid Farag
31	GK	EGY	Ahmed El Sayed
32	DF	EGY	Abdallah Bostangy
33	MF	EGY	Mohamed Ibrahim
34	DF	EGY	Moussa Mohamed
35	MF	EGY	Omar Khedr
36	GK	EGY	Abdelmonem Tamer
37	MF	MTN	Maata Magassa
72	MF	FRA	Marwane Hajij
73	DF	PLE	Wajdi Nabhan
74	MF	EGY	Mahmoud Ouka

=== Notable players ===
- (Egypt) Mostafa Ziko (2023–2025)
- (Egypt) Mahmoud Saber (2023–2024, 2025–)
- (Rwanda) York Rafael (2025)
- (Egypt) Tarek Alaa (2026–)

== Managers ==
- (Egypt) Hesham Zakaria (1 August 2014 - 30 June 2015)
- (Egypt) Mohamed Salah - 2 Times - (22 September 2015 - 30 December 2015, 13 October 2018 - 5 August 2019)
- (Egypt) Ahmed El-Kass (11 December 2016 - 21 January 2017)
- (Egypt) Ayman El Mizzayn (1 July 2017 - 18 December 2017)
- (Egypt) Khaled Galal - 2 Times - (18 December 2017 - 13 April 2018, 5 February 2020 –17 September 2020)
- (Egypt) Osama Nabieh - 2 Times - (5 August 2019 - 6 September 2019, 1 November 2020 - 13 March 2021)
- (Egypt) Abdelnaser Mohamed (7 September 2019 - 5 February 2020)
- (Egypt) Tareq Abdullah (15 September 2020 - 1 November 2020)
- (Egypt) Ismail Youssef (15 March 2021 – 1 June 2022)
- (Egypt) Magdy Abdel Aaty (18 June 2022 – Present)
