= 2018–19 Pyramids FC season =

Pyramids
2018–19 season
- Owner: Turki Al Sheikh
- President: Hossam El Badry
- Manager: Alberto Valentim (until 16 August); Ricardo La Volpe (until 29 October); Hossam Hassan (until 25 January); Ahmed Hassan (caretaker, until 5 February); Ramón Díaz (until 31 May); Sébastien Desabre (from 8 July)
- Stadium: 30 June Stadium
- Egyptian Premier League: 3rd
- Egypt Cup: Runners-up
- Top goalscorer: League: Eric Traoré (9 goals); All: Eric Traoré (11 goals)
Home colours	Away colours	Third colours

The 2018–19 Pyramids season was the 10th season in the football club's history and 2nd consecutive and 3rd overall season in the top flight of Egyptian football, the Egyptian Premier League, having been promoted from the Egyptian Second Division in 2017. It was also the 1st season for the club under their new name, after being sold to new owners and renamed from Al Assiouty Sport to Pyramids Football Club. In addition to the domestic league, Pyramids also participated in this season's editions of the domestic cup, the Egypt Cup. The season covered a period from 1 July 2018 to 30 June 2019; however Pyramids played their last match of the season in September 2019.

== Kit information ==
Supplier: Kappa
Sponsors: Saudia, Swyp

Home	Home alt.	Away	Away alt.	Third	Third alt.

== Players ==
=== Current squad ===
As of 1 February 2019

Note: Flags indicate national team as defined under FIFA eligibility rules; some limited exceptions apply. Players may hold more than one non-FIFA nationality.

No.	Pos.	Nation	Player
1	GK	EGY	El Mahdy Soliman
2	DF	EGY	Ahmed Ayman Mansour
3	DF	EGY	Abdallah Bakry
4	DF	EGY	Omar Gaber (Vice-captain)
5	DF	EGY	Ali Gabr (3rd captain)
6	MF	EGY	Mohamed Fathi
7	FW	BFA	Eric Traoré
8	FW	SYR	Omar Kharbin (on loan from Al Hilal)
9	FW	ECU	Jhon Cifuente
10	FW	BRA	Keno
11	MF	EGY	Mohamed Magdy
13	DF	EGY	Ragab Bakar
14	MF	EGY	Nabil Emad

No.	Pos.	Nation	Player
16	GK	EGY	Ahmed El Shenawy
17	FW	EGY	Mohamed Farouk
19	MF	EGY	Mohanad Lasheen
20	MF	EGY	Mohamed Rizk
21	DF	EGY	Mohamed Hamdy
22	FW	PER	Cristian Benavente
25	GK	EGY	Ahmed Daador
26	DF	SYR	Omar Midani
29	MF	EGY	Abdallah El Said (Captain)
32	FW	EGY	Nasser Mansi
37	FW	EGY	Hossam Ghanem
-	FW	EGY	Amr Marey

=== Out on loan ===
Note: Flags indicate national team as defined under FIFA eligibility rules; some limited exceptions apply. Players may hold more than one non-FIFA nationality.

No.	Pos.	Nation	Player
—	MF	NGR	Azubuike Okechukwu (at Çaykur Rizespor until 30 June 2019)
—	MF	EGY	Sherif Dabo (at El Gouna until 30 June 2019)
—	MF	EGY	Ahmed Tawfik (at Al Ittihad until 30 June 2019)

No.	Pos.	Nation	Player
—	FW	PLE	Hamed Hamdan (at El Entag El Harby until 30 June 2020)
—	FW	EGY	Mahmoud Salah (at Petrojet until 30 June 2019)

== Transfers ==
=== Transfers in ===
#	Position	Player	Transferred from	Fee	Date	Source
38	DF	(Egypt) Ahmed Shousha	(Egypt) Al Merreikh	E£750k	10 May 2018	
36	DF	(Egypt) Ahmed Khaled	(Egypt) Tanta	E£2m	16 June 2018	
21	DF	(Egypt) Mohamed Hamdy	(Egypt) Al Masry	E£27m	21 June 2018	
10	FW	(Brazil) Keno	(Brazil) Palmeiras	E£154m	25 June 2018	
17	FW	(Egypt) Mohamed Farouk	(Egypt) Al Mokawloon Al Arab	E£15m	26 June 2018	
32	FW	(Egypt) Nasser Mansi	(Egypt) El Dakhleya	Undisclosed	26 June 2018	
26	DF	(Syria) Omar Midani	(United Arab Emirates) Hatta	Free transfer	27 June 2018	
97	FW	(Brazil) Ribamar	(Brazil) Atlético Paranaense	E£71m	27 June 2018	
3	DF	(Egypt) Abdallah Bakry	(Egypt) Smouha	Undisclosed	28 June 2018	
11	MF	(Egypt) Mohamed Magdy	(Egypt) ENPPI	E£30m	28 June 2018	
6	MF	(Egypt) Mohamed Fathi	(Egypt) Ismaily	E£17m	28 June 2018	
7	FW	(Brazil) Carlos Eduardo	(Brazil) Goiás	E£93m	29 June 2018	
24	FW	(Brazil) Arthur	(Brazil) Chapecoense	E£39m	29 June 2018	
37	DF	(Egypt) Mohamed Tarek	(Egypt) El Raja	End of loan	30 June 2018	
13	DF	(Egypt) Ragab Bakar	(Egypt) Smouha	E£14m	5 July 2018	
12	MF	(Egypt) Ahmed Tawfik	(Egypt) Zamalek	E£13m	8 July 2018	
5	DF	(Egypt) Ali Gabr	(Egypt) Zamalek	E£39m	9 July 2018	
1	GK	(Egypt) El Mahdy Soliman	(Egypt) Smouha	Undisclosed	10 July 2018	
4	DF	(Egypt) Omar Gaber	(United States) Los Angeles FC	Undisclosed	12 July 2018	
16	GK	(Egypt) Ahmed El Shenawy	(Egypt) Zamalek	E£48m	13 July 2018	
9	FW	(Germany) Dani Schahin	(Netherlands) Roda JC	Free transfer	17 July 2018	
8	MF	(Brazil) Rodriguinho	(Brazil) Corinthians	E£91m	22 July 2018	
2	DF	(Egypt) Ahmed Ayman Mansour	(Egypt) Al Masry	Swap deal	28 July 2018	
97	MF	(Nigeria) Azubuike Okechukwu	(Turkey) Yeni Malatyaspor	E£36m	19 August 2018	
	FW	(Egypt) Amr Marey	(Tunisia) Étoile du Sahel	Undisclosed	3 December 2018	
7	FW	(Burkina Faso) Eric Traoré	(Egypt) Misr Lel Makkasa	E£47m	6 December 2018	
	FW	(Palestine) Hamed Hamdan	(Palestine) Gaza	Undisclosed	7 December 2018	
9	FW	(Ecuador) Jhon Cifuente	(Ecuador) Universidad Católica	E£78m	20 December 2018	
29	FW	(Egypt) Abdallah El Said	(Saudi Arabia) Al Ahli	Free transfer	4 January 2019	
22	FW	(Peru) Cristian Benavente	(Belgium) Charleroi	E£106m	23 January 2019	

==== Loans in ====
#	Position	Player	Loaned from	Date	Loan expires	Source
8	FW	(Syria) Omar Kharbin	(Saudi Arabia) Al Hilal	21 January 2019	30 June 2019	

=== Transfers out ===
Position	Player	Transferred to	Fee	Date	Source
FW	(Egypt) Omar Bassam	(Egypt) Misr Lel Makkasa	E£4m	2 June 2018	
FW	(Egypt) Hesham Ramadan	(Egypt) El Raja	Free transfer	3 June 2018	
MF	(Egypt) Mahmoud Shika	(Egypt) Petrojet	Undisclosed	14 June 2018	
FW	(Namibia) Benson Shilongo	(Egypt) Smouha	Free transfer	30 June 2018	
MF	(Egypt) Abdallah El Shahat	Released		30 June 2018	
DF	(Egypt) Mohamed Tarek	Released		30 June 2018	
FW	(Egypt) Mahmoud Abou Gouda	(Egypt) Misr Lel Makkasa	End of loan	30 June 2018	
DF	(Egypt) Ahmed Gamal	(Egypt) Nogoom	End of loan	30 June 2018	
MF	(Egypt) Omar Kamal	(Egypt) Al Masry	End of loan	30 June 2018	
MF	(Egypt) Mohamed Khalifa	(Portugal) Leixões	End of loan	30 June 2018	
FW	(Egypt) Sherif Reda	(Egypt) Smouha	Undisclosed	1 July 2018	
GK	(Egypt) Sherif Medhat	(Egypt) El Qanah	Free transfer	3 July 2018	
FW	(South Africa) Gift Links	(South Africa) Cape Town City	E£3m	5 July 2018	
DF	(Egypt) Ahmed Said Okka	(Egypt) El Gouna	Free transfer	5 July 2018	
MF	(Burkina Faso) Moussa Dao	(Kuwait) Al Jahra	Free transfer	7 July 2018	
GK	(Egypt) Essam Tharwat	(Egypt) Smouha	Undisclosed	12 July 2018	
MF	(Egypt) Omar Fathy	(Egypt) Ismaily	Undisclosed	16 July 2018	
DF	(Egypt) Selim Abdel Khalik	(Egypt) Ismaily	Undisclosed	22 July 2018	
DF	(Uganda) Isaac Muleme	(Egypt) Haras El Hodoud	Free transfer	27 July 2018	
FW	(Brazil) Arthur	(Saudi Arabia) Al Shabab	Undisclosed	28 July 2018	
DF	(Egypt) Ahmed Khaled	(Egypt) Al Masry	Swap deal	28 July 2018	
DF	(Egypt) Ahmed Shousha	(Egypt) Al Masry	Swap deal	28 July 2018	
MF	(Egypt) Shehab El Din Ahmed	(Saudi Arabia) Al Amal	Free transfer	14 August 2018	
FW	(Brazil) Carlos Eduardo	(Brazil) Palmeiras	E£116m	19 December 2018	
FW	(Brazil) Ribamar	(Brazil) Vasco da Gama	Undisclosed	27 December 2018	
FW	(Germany) Dani Schahin	Released		31 December 2018	
FW	(Egypt) Ahmed Afifi	(Egypt) Petrojet	E£2m	20 January 2019	
DF	(Egypt) Hamada Tolba	(Egypt) Petrojet	Free transfer	20 January 2019	
DF	(Egypt) Islam Siam	(Egypt) Petrojet	Free transfer	20 January 2019	
MF	(Brazil) Rodriguinho	(Brazil) Cruzeiro	E£107m	22 January 2019	

==== Loans out ====
Position	Player	Loaned to	Date	Loan expires	Source
FW	(Egypt) Mahmoud Salah	(Egypt) Petrojet	29 July 2018	30 June 2019	
FW	(Brazil) Ribamar	(Saudi Arabia) Ohod	16 August 2018	27 December 2018	
MF	(Egypt) Ahmed Tawfik	(Egypt) Al Ittihad	21 January 2019	30 June 2019	
MF	(Nigeria) Azubuike Okechukwu	(Turkey) Çaykur Rizespor	23 January 2019	30 June 2019	
MF	(Egypt) Sherif Dabo	(Egypt) El Gouna	31 January 2019	30 June 2019	
FW	(Palestine) Hamed Hamdan	(Egypt) El Entag El Harby	31 January 2019	30 June 2020	

== Friendly matches ==
Win Draw Loss

11 July 2018	Pyramids (Egypt)	4–1	(Moldova) Zimbru Chișinău	Alexandria, Egypt
16:00 CAT (UTC+2)	?? 24' (pen.); ?? 44'; ?? 65'; ?? 89'	Report	Zagaevschi 7'	Stadium: Borg El Arab Stadium

16 July 2018	Pyramids (Egypt)	1–1	(Russia) Akhmat Grozny	Alexandria, Egypt
16:00 CAT (UTC+2)	?? (??)	Report	?? (??)	Stadium: Alexandria Stadium

26 July 2018	Pyramids (Egypt)	1–1	(Spain) Rayo Vallecano	Alexandria, Egypt
19:00 CAT (UTC+2)	Keno 45+2' (pen.)	Report	Guerra 39'	Stadium: Borg El Arab Stadium

19 August 2018	Pyramids (Egypt)	2–1	(Saudi Arabia) Al Wehda	Cairo, Egypt
19:00 CAT (UTC+2)	Gabr 32'; Tolba 90+4'	Report	Guilherme 18' (pen.)	Stadium: 30 June Stadium

7 September 2018	Pyramids (Egypt)	1–0	(Tunisia) Club Africain	Cairo, Egypt
19:00 CAT (UTC+2)	Dabo 20'	Report		Stadium: Petro Sport Stadium

23 September 2018	Pyramids (Egypt)	2–2	(Tunisia) CA Bizertin	Cairo, Egypt
20:00 CAT (UTC+2)	Magdy 5' (pen.); Afifi 22'	Report	Ben Choug 2'; Darragi 56'	Stadium: 30 June Stadium subfield

3 November 2018	Pyramids (Egypt)	7–0	(Egypt) Plastic Shubra El Kheima	Cairo, Egypt
15:00 CAT (UTC+2)	?? (??); ?? (??); ?? (??); ?? (??); ?? (??); ?? (??); ?? (??)	Report		Stadium: 30 June Stadium

6 November 2018	Pyramids (Egypt)	2–0	(Egypt) Banha	Cairo, Egypt
16:00 CAT (UTC+2)	?? (??); ?? (??)	Report		Stadium: 30 June Stadium

25 December 2018	Pyramids (Egypt)	5–0	(Egypt) El Qawmi	Cairo, Egypt
19:30 CAT (UTC+2)	Mansi (??); Hamdan (??); Rodriguinho (??); Marey (??)	Report		Stadium: 30 June Stadium

16 March 2019	Pyramids (Egypt)	1–0	(Egypt) Ceramica Cleopatra	Cairo, Egypt
16:00 CAT (UTC+2)	Traoré (??)	Report		Stadium: 30 June Stadium subfield

== Competitions ==
=== Overview ===
Competition	First match	Last match	Starting round	Final position	Record							
Competition	First match	Last match	Starting round	Final position	Pld	W	D	L	GF	GA	GD	Win %
Egyptian Premier League	3 August 2018	30 May 2019	Matchday 1	3rd	34	19	13	2	61	31	+30	55.88
Egypt Cup	9 October 2018	8 September 2019	Round of 32	Runners-up	5	4	0	1	8	5	+3	80.00
Total					39	23	13	3	69	36	+33	58.97

Source: Competitions

=== Egyptian Premier League ===
==== League table ====
Pos	Team	Pld	W	D	L	GF	GA	GD	Pts	Qualification or relegation
1	Al Ahly (C)	34	25	5	4	56	20	+36	80	Qualification for the Champions League
2	Zamalek	34	21	9	4	65	31	+34	72	Qualification for the Champions League
3	Pyramids	34	19	13	2	61	31	+30	70	Qualification for the Confederation Cup (Note: Since the 2018–19 Egypt Cup wouldn't finish by the CAF deadline, the spot awarded to the Egypt Cup winners (Confederation Cup preliminary or first round) was passed to the fourth-placed team, Al Masry.)
4	Al Masry	34	12	16	6	45	38	+7	52	Qualification for the Confederation Cup
5	Al Mokawloon Al Arab	34	13	9	12	45	38	+7	48	

Source: Soccerway
Rules for classification: 1) Points; 2) Head-to-Head points; 3) Head-to-Head goal difference; 4) Head-to-Head goals scored; 5) Head-to-Head away goals scored; 6) Goal difference; 7) Goals scored (Note: Head-to-head record is used only after all the matches between the teams in question have been played).
(C) Champions

==== Results summary ====
Overall								Home						Away					
Pld	W	D	L	GF	GA	GD	Pts	W	D	L	GF	GA	GD	W	D	L	GF	GA	GD
34	19	13	2	61	31	+30	70	11	6	0	35	13	+22	8	7	2	26	18	+8

Source: Soccerway

==== Results by round ====
Round	1	2	3	4	5	6	7	8	9	10	11	12	13	14	15	16	17	18	19	20	21	22	23	24	25	26	27	28	29	30	31	32	33	34
Ground	A	H	A	H	A	H	A	H	A	H	A	H	A	H	A	A	H	H	A	H	A	H	A	H	A	H	A	H	A	H	A	H	H	A
Result	W	D	W	W	D	D	W	W	D	D	L	W	D	W	D	W	W	D	D	W	W	W	L	W	W	W	W	W	W	D	D	D	W	D
Position	4	6	5	2	2	3	1	2	3	3	4	3	5	2	2	2	2	2	2	2	2	2	2	2	2	3	3	3	1	1	2	2	2	3

Source: Soccerway
A = Away; H = Home; W = Win; D = Draw; L = Loss

==== Matches ====
3 August 2018 1	ENPPI	0–1	Pyramids	Cairo
21:00 CAT (UTC+2)		Report	Magdy 90+4'	Stadium: Petro Sport Stadium; Referee: Mohamed Adel

8 August 2018 2	Pyramids	1–1	El Entag El Harby	Cairo
16:30 CAT (UTC+2)	Keno 75'	Report	Ragab 43'	Stadium: 30 June Stadium; Referee: Ahmed El Ghandour

14 August 2018 3	Tala'ea El Gaish	1–2	Pyramids	Cairo
21:00 CAT (UTC+2)	Asem 69'	Report	Ribamar 52', 74'	Stadium: Gehaz El Reyada Stadium; Referee: Gehad Grisha

26 August 2018 4	Pyramids	3–1	El Dakhleya	Cairo
18:15 CAT (UTC+2)	Keno 28'; Gabr 87'; Magdy 90+6'	Report	Gaber 51'	Stadium: 30 June Stadium; Referee: Mohamed El Hanafy

2 September 2018 5	Smouha	1–1	Pyramids	Alexandria
18:00 CAT (UTC+2)	Sayed 12'	Report	Tawfik 23'	Stadium: Borg El Arab Stadium; Referee: Mahmoud El Banna

12 September 2018 6	Pyramids	1–1	El Gouna	Cairo
21:00 CAT (UTC+2)	Keno 90+6'	Report	Okka 57'	Stadium: 30 June Stadium; Referee: Abdel Aziz El Sayed

21 September 2018 7	Al Mokawloon Al Arab	0–1	Pyramids	Cairo
21:00 CAT (UTC+2)		Report	Keno 64'	Stadium: Osman Ahmed Osman Stadium; Referee: Sadok Selmi (Tunisia)

3 October 2018 (Note: Pyramids v Petrojet match, originally scheduled to be played on 6 October 2018, was played on 3 October 2018 to avoid scheduling conflicts.) 10	Pyramids	3–3	Petrojet	Cairo
18:00 CAT (UTC+2)	Bakar 24'; Farouk 28'; Keno 43'	Report	Bekele 2', 76'; El Sebaie 79' (pen.)	Stadium: 30 June Stadium; Referee: Mohamed Adel

19 October 2018 11	Ismaily	2–0	Pyramids	Ismailia
18:00 CAT (UTC+2)	Metwalli 6'; Jaziri 69' (pen.)	Report		Stadium: Ismailia Stadium; Referee: Mohamed El Hanafy

2 November 2018 12	Pyramids	3–0	Al Ittihad	Cairo
17:30 CAT (UTC+2)	Mansour 13'; Bakar 61'; Keno 74'	Report		Stadium: 30 June Stadium; Referee: Gehad Grisha

12 November 2018 14	Pyramids	2–0	Misr Lel Makkasa	Cairo
20:00 CAT (UTC+2)	Gabr 9'; Afifi 77'	Report		Stadium: 30 June Stadium; Referee: Amin Omar

21 November 2018 15	Wadi Degla	1–1	Pyramids	Cairo
20:00 CAT (UTC+2)	Ndiaye 53'	Report	Salem 19' (o.g.)	Stadium: Petro Sport Stadium; Referee: Mohamed El Sabahy

28 November 2018 16	Nogoom	0–2	Pyramids	Cairo
19:00 CAT (UTC+2)		Report	Dunga 78'; Carlos Eduardo 90+4'	Stadium: Petro Sport Stadium; Referee: Slim Belkhouas (Tunisia)

10 December 2018 17	Pyramids	3–1	Haras El Hodoud	Cairo
19:30 CAT (UTC+2)	Magdy 27'; Dunga 59'; Farouk 73'	Report	El Sheikh 87'	Stadium: 30 June Stadium; Referee: Haythem Guirat (Tunisia)

22 December 2018 18	Pyramids	1–1	ENPPI	Cairo
19:30 CAT (UTC+2)	Farouk 39'	Report	Sabry 22'	Stadium: 30 June Stadium; Referee: Redouane Jiyed (Morocco)

4 January 2019 (Note: Pyramids v Al Ahly match, originally scheduled to be played on 22 September 2018, was postponed due to conflicting with Al Ahly v Horoya match in the CAF Champions League, which was set to be played on the same day. The match was later rescheduled to be played on 4 January 2019.) 8	Pyramids	2–1	Al Ahly	Cairo
18:00 CAT (UTC+2)	Farouk 47'; El Said 57'	Report	Azaro 33'	Stadium: 30 June Stadium; Referee: Danilo Grujić (Serbia)

8 January 2019 (Note: Al Masry v Pyramids match, originally scheduled to be played on 7 November 2018, was postponed due to security concerns. The match was later rescheduled to be played on 8 January 2019.) 13	Al Masry	3–3	Pyramids	Ismailia (Note: Al Masry v Pyramids match was played at Ismailia Stadium in Ismailia instead of Al Masry Club Stadium in Port Said due to security concerns.)
19:30 CAT (UTC+2)	Ragab 47'; Gomaa 90+2' (pen.); Simporé 90+5'	Report	Cifuente 7'; Traoré 60'; Mansi 89'	Stadium: Ismailia Stadium; Referee: Tore Hansen (Norway)

15 January 2019 19	El Entag El Harby	1–1	Pyramids	Cairo
17:00 CAT (UTC+2)	Owoboskini 40'	Report	Magdy 19' (pen.)	Stadium: Al Salam Stadium; Referee: Mehrez Melki (Tunisia)

19 January 2019 20	Pyramids	3–1	Tala'ea El Gaish	Cairo
18:00 CAT (UTC+2)	Mansour 37'; Magdy 55'; Mostafa 87' (o.g.)	Report	Gamal 16'	Stadium: 30 June Stadium; Referee: Omar Al Ali (United Arab Emirates)

24 January 2019 (Note: Zamalek v Pyramids match, originally scheduled to be played on 2 October 2018, was postponed due to security concerns. The match was later rescheduled to be played on 24 January 2019.) 9	Zamalek	3–3	Pyramids	Cairo
20:00 CAT (UTC+2)	Sassi 8', 65'; Alaa 42'	Report	Traoré 15'; Keno 37'; Kharbin 85'	Stadium: Petro Sport Stadium; Referee: Gianluca Rocchi (Italy)

4 February 2019 21	El Dakhleya	0–2	Pyramids	Cairo
19:30 CAT (UTC+2)		Report	Kharbin 90+1' (pen.); Benavente 90+5'	Stadium: Police Academy Stadium; Referee: Youssef Essrayri (Tunisia)

14 February 2019 22	Pyramids	4–0	Smouha	Cairo
19:30 CAT (UTC+2)	Mansour 48' (o.g.); Cifuente 57'; Kharbin 62' (pen.); El Said 90+4'	Report		Stadium: 30 June Stadium; Referee: Novak Simović (Serbia)

19 February 2019 23	El Gouna	2–1	Pyramids	El Gouna
16:00 CAT (UTC+2)	Abdel Naim 51'; Rayyan 60'	Report	El Said 77'	Stadium: El Gouna Stadium; Referee: Fran Jović (Croatia)

24 February 2019 24	Pyramids	1–0	Al Mokawloon Al Arab	Cairo
19:00 CAT (UTC+2)	Kharbin 65'	Report		Stadium: 30 June Stadium; Referee: João Capela (Portugal)

1 April 2019 27	Petrojet	0–2	Pyramids	Suez
19:30 CAT (UTC+2)		Report	Traoré 64', 67'	Stadium: Egyptian Army Stadium; Referee: Matej Jug (Slovenia)

6 April 2019 28	Pyramids	3–1	Ismaily	Cairo
20:00 CAT (UTC+2)	Benavente 14', 63'; Kharbin 19' (pen.)	Report	Metwalli 39' (pen.)	Stadium: 30 June Stadium; Referee: Mario Zebec (Croatia)

11 April 2019 29	Al Ittihad	2–3	Pyramids	Alexandria
20:00 CAT (UTC+2)	Cissé 35'; Kamar 63'	Report	Traoré 60', 82', 84'	Stadium: Haras El Hodoud Stadium (Note: Al Ittihad v Pyramids match was played at Haras El Hodoud Stadium instead of Borg El Arab Stadium due to pitch status.); Referee: Marius Avram (Romania)

18 April 2019 (Note: Al Ahly v Pyramids match, originally scheduled to be played on 28 February 2019, was postponed due to conflicting with both sides' match in the Egypt Cup, which was set to be played on the same day. The match was later rescheduled to be played on 18 April 2019. Despite both sides' match in the Egypt Cup was however later postponed too, the Egyptian Football Association refused to change the date for this match again.) 25	Al Ahly	0–1	Pyramids	Cairo
20:00 CAT (UTC+2)		Report	Keno 14'	Stadium: Petro Sport Stadium; Referee: Ivan Bebek (Croatia)

23 April 2019 (Note: Pyramids v Zamalek match, originally scheduled to be played on 13 March 2019, was postponed due to conflicting with Zamalek v Gor Mahia match in the CAF Confederation Cup, which was set to be played on 10 March 2018. The match was later rescheduled to be played on 23 April 2019.) 26	Pyramids	1–0	Zamalek	Cairo
20:00 CAT (UTC+2)	Gabr 25'	Report		Stadium: 30 June Stadium; Referee: Ola Hobber Nilsen (Norway)

30 April 2019 31	Misr Lel Makkasa	1–1	Pyramids	Cairo (Note: Misr Lel Makkasa v Pyramids match was played at Osman Ahmed Osman Stadium in Cairo instead of Faiyum Stadium in Faiyum due to pitch status.)
20:00 CAT (UTC+2)	Antwi 86'	Report	El Said 29'	Stadium: Osman Ahmed Osman Stadium; Referee: Tihomir Pejin (Croatia)

5 May 2019 (Note: Pyramids v Al Masry match, originally scheduled to be played on 26 April 2019, was postponed due to conflicting with Al Ahly v Al Masry match in the Egyptian Premier League, which was set to be played on 25 April 2019. The match was later rescheduled to be played on 5 May 2019.) 30	Pyramids	1–1	Al Masry	Suez (Note: Pyramids v Al Masry match was played at the Egyptian Army Stadium in Suez instead of 30 June Stadium in Cairo due to security concerns.)
17:30 CAT (UTC+2)	Kharbin 4'	Report	Wadi 68'	Stadium: Egyptian Army Stadium; Referee: Sebastian Colțescu (Romania)

14 May 2019 32	Pyramids	1–1	Wadi Degla	Cairo
22:00 CAT (UTC+2)	Traoré 66'	Report	Helal 9'	Stadium: 30 June Stadium; Referee: Roberto García Orozco (Mexico)

22 May 2019 33	Pyramids	2–0	Nogoom	Cairo
22:00 CAT (UTC+2)	Farouk 3'; Cifuente 14'	Report		Stadium: 30 June Stadium; Referee: Yosri Bouali (Tunisia)

30 May 2019 34	Haras El Hodoud	1–1	Pyramids	Cairo (Note: Haras El Hodoud v Pyramids match was played at Gehaz El Reyada Stadium in Cairo instead of Haras El Hodoud Stadium in Alexandria due to pitch status.)
22:00 CAT (UTC+2)	Koné 83'	Report	Traoré 29'	Stadium: Gehaz El Reyada Stadium; Referee: Amin Omar

=== Egypt Cup ===
Pyramids entered the competition from the round of 32 and were given a home tie against Tanta. Starting from the round of 16, all matches were played on stadiums selected by the Egyptian Football Association.

9 October 2018 Round of 32	Pyramids	3–2	Tanta	Cairo
21:00 CAT (UTC+2)	Keno 34', 55'; Magdy 71' (pen.)	Report	El Sayed 2'; El Dah 58' (pen.)	Stadium: 30 June Stadium; Referee: Ahmed Abdallah

17 August 2019 (Note: Al Ahly v Pyramids match, originally scheduled to be played on 25 October 2018, was postponed due to conflicting with Al Ahly v ES Sétif match in the CAF Champions League, which was set to be played on 23 October 2018. The match was later rescheduled to be played on 28 February 2019. However the match was postponed again on 26 February 2019 due to security concerns. The match was later once again rescheduled to be played on 17 August 2019.) Round of 16	Al Ahly	0–1	Pyramids	Alexandria
20:00 CAT (UTC+2)		Report	Traoré 55'	Stadium: Borg El Arab Stadium; Referee: Gehad Grisha

30 August 2019 Quarter-finals	Pyramids	2–0	Haras El Hodoud	Cairo
20:00 CAT (UTC+2)	Antwi 48' (pen.), 69'	Report		Stadium: Petro Sport Stadium; Referee: Mohamed El Hanafy

2 September 2019 Semi-finals	Pyramids	2–0	Petrojet	Cairo
20:00 CAT (UTC+2)	Traoré 16'; Hassan 44'	Report		Stadium: Petro Sport Stadium; Referee: Mahmoud Ashour

8 September 2019 Final	Pyramids	0–3	Zamalek	Alexandria
20:00 CAT (UTC+2)		Report	Obama 52'; Bencharki 63', 83'	Stadium: Borg El Arab Stadium; Referee: Radu Petrescu (Romania)

== Statistics ==
=== Appearances and goals ===
No.	Pos	Player	Egyptian Premier League		Egypt Cup		Total	
No.	Pos	Player	Apps	Goals	Apps	Goals	Apps	Goals
1	GK	(Egypt) El Mahdy Soliman	13	0	1+1	0	15	0
2	DF	(Egypt) Ahmed Ayman Mansour	25+3	2	5	0	33	2
3	DF	(Egypt) Abdallah Bakry	13+2	0	1	0	16	0
4	DF	(Egypt) Omar Gaber	21+6	0	2+2	0	31	0
5	DF	(Egypt) Ali Gabr	24+3	3	4	0	31	3
6	MF	(Egypt) Mohamed Fathi	10+7	0	1+1	0	19	0
7	FW	(Burkina Faso) Eric Traoré	14+1	9	4	2	19	11
8	FW	(Syria) Omar Kharbin	12	6	0	0	12	6
9	FW	(Ecuador) Jhon Cifuente	9+5	3	0	0	14	3
10	FW	(Brazil) Keno	30+1	8	1	2	32	10
11	MF	(Egypt) Mohamed Magdy	18+5	5	1	1	24	6
13	DF	(Egypt) Ragab Bakar	26	2	5	0	31	2
14	MF	(Egypt) Nabil Emad	28+2	2	5	0	35	2
16	GK	(Egypt) Ahmed El Shenawy	21	0	4	0	25	0
17	FW	(Egypt) Mohamed Farouk	19+7	5	1+1	0	28	5
19	MF	(Egypt) Mohanad Lasheen	2+5	0	1	0	8	0
20	MF	(Egypt) Mohamed Rizk	1+6	0	0	0	7	0
21	DF	(Egypt) Mohamed Hamdy	14	0	4	0	18	0
22	FW	(Peru) Cristian Benavente	7+5	3	0	0	12	3
25	GK	(Egypt) Ahmed Daador	0	0	0	0	0	0
24	DF	(Syria) Omar Midani	12	0	0	0	12	0
29	MF	(Egypt) Abdallah El Said	18	4	2+1	0	21	4
32	FW	(Egypt) Nasser Mansi	10+11	1	0+1	0	22	1
33	MF	(Egypt) Mahmoud Abdel Kader	0+1	0	0	0	1	0
35	MF	(Egypt) Ibrahim Adel	1	0	0	0	1	0
36	MF	(Egypt) Ahmed Adel	0+1	0	0	0	1	0
37	FW	(Egypt) Hossam Ghanem	1+1	0	0	0	2	0
Players joined during the 2019 summer transfer window
8	FW	(Egypt) Islam Issa	0	0	3	0	3	0
9	FW	(Ghana) John Antwi	0	0	3	2	3	2
10	FW	(Uganda) Ibrahim Hassan	0	0	2+1	1	3	1
11	DF	(Egypt) Tarek Taha	0	0	0+1	0	1	0
22	FW	(Uganda) Lumala Abdu	0	0	2+1	0	3	0
23	FW	(Egypt) Ahmed Ali	0	0	1+2	0	3	0
Players transferred out during the season
7	FW	(Brazil) Carlos Eduardo	5+5	1	0	0	10	1
8	MF	(Brazil) Rodriguinho	8+3	0	1	0	12	0
9	FW	(Germany) Dani Schahin	0+4	0	0	0	4	0
12	MF	(Egypt) Ahmed Tawfik	4+3	1	0+3	0	10	1
15	MF	(Egypt) Sherif Dabo	1+3	0	0	0	4	0
22	DF	(Egypt) Hamada Tolba	1	0	1	0	2	0
23	DF	(Egypt) Islam Siam	0	0	0	0	0	0
27	FW	(Egypt) Ahmed Afifi	1+6	1	0	0	7	1
97	MF	(Nigeria) Azubuike Okechukwu	3+3	0	0	0	6	0
97	FW	(Brazil) Ribamar	3	2	0	0	3	2

=== Goalscorers ===
Rank	Position	Name	Egyptian Premier League	Egypt Cup	Total
1	FW	(Burkina Faso) Eric Traoré	9	2	11
2	FW	(Brazil) Keno	8	2	10
3	FW	(Syria) Omar Kharbin	6	0	6
3	FW	(Egypt) Mohamed Magdy	5	1	6
5	FW	(Egypt) Mohamed Farouk	5	0	5
6	MF	(Egypt) Abdallah El Said	4	0	4
7	FW	(Peru) Cristian Benavente	3	0	3
7	FW	(Ecuador) Jhon Cifuente	3	0	3
7	DF	(Egypt) Ali Gabr	3	0	3
10	FW	(Ghana) John Antwi	0	2	2
10	DF	(Egypt) Ragab Bakar	2	0	2
10	MF	(Egypt) Nabil Emad	2	0	2
10	DF	(Egypt) Ahmed Ayman Mansour	2	0	2
10	FW	(Brazil) Ribamar	2	0	2
15	FW	(Egypt) Ahmed Afifi	1	0	1
15	FW	(Brazil) Carlos Eduardo	1	0	1
15	FW	(Egypt) Ibrahim Hassan	0	1	1
15	FW	(Egypt) Nasser Mansi	1	0	1
15	MF	(Egypt) Ahmed Tawfik	1	0	1
Own goal			3	0	3
Total			61	8	69

=== Clean sheets ===
Rank	Name	Egyptian Premier League	Egypt Cup	Total
1	(Egypt) Ahmed El Shenawy	10	2	12
2	(Egypt) El Mahdy Soliman	2	1	3
Total		12	3	15
