= 2019–20 Pyramids FC season =

Pyramids
2019–20 season
- Owner: Salem Al Shamsi
- President: Mamdouh Eid
- Manager: Sébastien Desabre (8 July – 19 December 2019); Abdel Aziz Abdel Shafy (caretaker) (19–27 December 2019); Ante Čačić (27 December 2019 – present)
- Stadium: 30 June Stadium
- Egyptian Premier League: 3rd
- Egypt Cup: Quarter-finals
- CAF Confederation Cup: final
- Top goalscorer: League: Abdallah El Said (12 goals); All: Abdallah El Said (14 goals)
Home colours	Away colours	Third colours
- All statistics correct as of 21 February 2020.

The 2019–20 Pyramids season is the 11th season in the football club's history and 3rd consecutive and 4th overall season in the top flight of Egyptian football, the Egyptian Premier League, having been promoted from the Egyptian Second Division in 2017. In addition to the domestic league, Pyramids are also participating in this season's editions of the domestic cup, the Egypt Cup and the second-tier African cup, the CAF Confederation Cup. The season covers a period from 1 July 2019 to 30 June 2020.

== Kit information ==
Supplier: Adidas
Sponsors: Swyp

Home	Away	Third

== Players ==
=== Current squad ===
As of 1 February 2020

Note: Flags indicate national team as defined under FIFA eligibility rules; some limited exceptions apply. Players may hold more than one non-FIFA nationality.

No.	Pos.	Nation	Player
1	GK	EGY	El Mahdy Soliman
2	DF	EGY	Ahmed Ayman Mansour
3	DF	EGY	Abdallah Bakry
4	DF	EGY	Omar Gaber (Vice-captain)
5	DF	EGY	Ali Gabr (3rd captain)
6	MF	EGY	Mohamed Fathy
7	FW	BFA	Eric Traoré
8	FW	EGY	Islam Issa
9	FW	GHA	John Antwi
10	FW	EGY	Ibrahim Hassan
11	DF	EGY	Tarek Taha
12	MF	EGY	Ahmed Tawfik
13	DF	EGY	Ragab Bakar
14	MF	EGY	Nabil Emad
15	MF	EGY	Mahmoud Hamada

No.	Pos.	Nation	Player
16	GK	EGY	Ahmed El Shenawy
17	FW	EGY	Mohamed Farouk
18	FW	TUN	Amor Layouni
19	MF	EGY	Abdallah El Said (Captain)
20	DF	EGY	Mohamed Atwa
21	DF	EGY	Mohamed Hamdy
22	FW	UGA	Lumala Abdu
24	DF	CIV	Wilfried Kanon
25	GK	EGY	Ahmed Daador
26	FW	EGY	Mohamed El Gabbas
33	DF	EGY	Mahmoud Abdel Kader
35	FW	EGY	Ibrahim Adel
37	FW	EGY	Hossam Ghanem
—	FW	EGY	Ahmed Hamoudi

=== Out on loan ===
Note: Flags indicate national team as defined under FIFA eligibility rules; some limited exceptions apply. Players may hold more than one non-FIFA nationality.

No.	Pos.	Nation	Player
—	MF	NGR	Azubuike Okechukwu (at İstanbul Başakşehir until 30 June 2020)
—	FW	EGY	Ahmed Ali (at ENPPI until 30 June 2020)
—	FW	PER	Cristian Benavente (at Nantes until 30 June 2020)
—	FW	BRA	Keno (at Al Jazira until 30 June 2020)

No.	Pos.	Nation	Player
—	FW	EGY	Nasser Mansi (at Tala'ea El Gaish until 30 June 2020)
—	FW	EGY	Amr Marey (at Misr Lel Makkasa until 30 June 2020)
—	FW	BRA	Ribamar (at Vasco da Gama until 31 December 2020)
—	FW	EGY	Mahmoud Salah (at ENPPI until 30 June 2020)

== Competitions ==
=== Overview ===
Competition	First match	Last match	Starting round	Record							
Competition	First match	Last match	Starting round	Pld	W	D	L	GF	GA	GD	Win %
Egyptian Premier League	21 September 2019	May 2020	Matchday 1	26	13	6	7	41	28	+13	50.00
Egypt Cup	5 December 2019		Round of 32	2	2	0	0	7	1	+6	100.00
CAF Confederation Cup	10 August 2019		Preliminary round	15	12	1	2	29	7	+22	80.00
Total				43	27	7	9	77	36	+41	62.79

Last updated: 13 September 2020
Source: Competitions

=== Egyptian Premier League ===
==== League table ====
Pos	Team	Pld	W	D	L	GF	GA	GD	Pts	Qualification or relegation
1	Al Ahly (C)	34	28	5	1	74	8	+66	89	Qualification for the Champions League
2	Zamalek	34	21	8	5	50	27	+23	68 (Note: As a result of Zamalek refusing to play their away fixture against Al Ahly on 24 February 2020, the club was subject to a 3-point deduction following the conclusion of the season.)	Qualification for the Champions League
3	Pyramids	34	19	8	7	54	33	+21	65	Qualification for the Confederation Cup (Note: Since the 2019–20 Egypt Cup wouldn't finish by the CAF deadline, the spot awarded to the Egypt Cup winners (Confederation Cup preliminary or first round) was passed to the fourth-placed team, Al Mokawloon Al Arab.)
4	Al Mokawloon Al Arab	34	15	9	10	45	34	+11	54	Qualification for the Confederation Cup
5	Smouha	34	11	18	5	44	33	+11	51	

Source: Soccerway
Rules for classification: 1) Points; 2) Head-to-Head points; 3) Head-to-Head goal difference; 4) Head-to-Head goals scored; 5) Head-to-Head away goals scored; 6) Goal difference; 7) Goals scored.
(Note: Head-to-head record is used only after all the matches between the teams in question have been played).
(C) Champions

==== Results summary ====
Overall								Home						Away					
Pld	W	D	L	GF	GA	GD	Pts	W	D	L	GF	GA	GD	W	D	L	GF	GA	GD
26	13	6	7	41	28	+13	45	6	3	4	22	13	+9	7	3	3	19	15	+4

Last updated: 13 September 2020.
Source: Soccerway

==== Results by round ====
Round	1	2	3	4	5	6	7	8	9	10	11	12	13	14	15	16	17	18	19	20	21	22	23	24	25	26	27	28	29	30	31	32	33	34
Ground	H	A	A	H	A	H	A	H	A	H	A	H	A	H	A	H	A	A	H	H	A	H	A	H	A	H	A	H	A	H	A	H	A	H
Result	W	W	D	D	W	D	L	L	D	W	L	W	D	W	W	L	W																	
Position	1	1	2	2	2	4	5	7	7	5	6	5	5	5	3	5	3																	

Updated to match(es) played on 24 February 2020. Source: Soccerway
A = Away; H = Home; W = Win; D = Draw; L = Loss

==== Matches ====
The fixtures for the 2019–20 season were announced on 12 September 2019.

21 September 2019 1	Pyramids	4–0	ENPPI	Cairo
20:00 CAT (UTC+2)	Gaber 29'; El Said 55' (pen.), 68'; Farouk 79' (pen.), (yellow card) 80'	Report		Stadium: 30 June Stadium; Referee: Mohamed Maarouf

3 October 2019 2	Tanta	1–2	Pyramids	Tanta
15:00 CAT (UTC+2)	Lwanga (yellow card) 8'; El Dah 89' (pen.)	Report	Hassan 2', (yellow card) 13'; El Said 29'; Kanon (yellow card) 50'	Stadium: Tanta Club Stadium; Referee: Tarek Samy

6 October 2019 3	Tala'ea El Gaish	2–2	Pyramids	Cairo
17:30 CAT (UTC+2)	El Sisi (yellow card) 51'; N'Diaye 84', (yellow card) 85'; Abou El Magd (yellow card) 88'; Tarek 90+1', (yellow card) 90+2'	Report	Fathy (yellow card) 33' (yellow-red card) 36'; Traoré 65'; Farouk 90+4'	Stadium: Gehaz El Reyada Stadium; Referee: Amin Omar

17 October 2019 4	Pyramids	0–0	Smouha	Cairo
20:00 CAT (UTC+2)	Dunga (yellow card) 55'	Report	Diop (yellow card) 56'; Soliman (yellow card) 90+2'	Stadium: 30 June Stadium; Referee: Mohamed El Sabahy

21 October 2019 5	El Entag El Harby	2–3	Pyramids	Cairo
17:30 CAT (UTC+2)	El Henawy 79' (pen.); Vieira 83', (yellow card) 90'	Report	El Said 40', 65'; Traoré 45'; Farouk (yellow card) 47'	Stadium: Al Salam Stadium; Referee: Mahmoud Ashour

27 November 2019 (Note: All Egyptian Premier League fixtures scheduled to be played between 23 October and 22 November 2019 were postponed due to Egypt U-23 team's involvement in the 2019 Africa U-23 Cup of Nations.) 6	Pyramids	2–2	Aswan	Cairo
17:00 CAT (UTC+2)	Antwi 7'; Traoré (yellow card) 37'; Farouk 45'; Bakar (yellow card) 73'; Gabr (yellow card) 80'	Report	El Neny (yellow card) 25'; Oukri 43', 75'; Awad (yellow card) 45'; Naim (yellow card) 59'	Stadium: 30 June Stadium; Referee: Ibrahim Mahgoub

12 December 2019 7	Zamalek	2–0	Pyramids	Cairo
19:30 CAT (UTC+2)	Mostafa (yellow card) 26', (goal) 53'; Alaa 79' (pen.)	Report	Farouk (yellow card) 18'; Fathy (yellow card) 23'; Bakry (yellow card) 90'; Gabr (yellow card) 90+3'	Stadium: Cairo International Stadium; Referee: Mahmoud Ashour

17 December 2019 8	Pyramids	2–3	El Gouna	Cairo
19:30 CAT (UTC+2)	El Said 45+2', 90+3', (yellow card) 52'; Gabr (yellow card) 77'; Dunga (yellow card) 87'	Report	Leila (yellow card) 23'; Hamdy 32'; Barakat (yellow card) 54'; Amoury (yellow card) 64'; Rayyan 68'; Bwalya 90+5'; Shabrawy (yellow card) 90+6'	Stadium: 30 June Stadium; Referee: Mahmoud Nagy

21 December 2019 9	Al Masry	1–1	Pyramids	Suez (Note: The Al Masry v Pyramids match was played at Suez Stadium in Suez instead of Al Masry Club Stadium in Port Said due to renovation process.)
19:30 CAT (UTC+2)	Magdy (yellow card) 14'; Wadi (yellow card) 45'; Hamad (yellow card) 45+2'; El Eraky (yellow card) 67'; Ali 74'; Shousha (yellow card) 82'	Report	El Said 45+4', (yellow card) 82'; Bakry (yellow card) 73'	Stadium: Suez Stadium; Referee: Mohamed Adel

25 December 2019 10	Pyramids	1–0	Wadi Degla	Cairo
19:30 CAT (UTC+2)	El Said 75' (pen.); Tawfik (yellow card) 89'; Hamada (yellow card) 90+3'	Report	Ab. Ramadan (yellow card) 25'; Helal (yellow card) 26'; Kabou (yellow card) 45+2'; Abdel Aati (yellow card) 73'; K. Reda (yellow card) 89'	Stadium: 30 June Stadium; Referee: Mohamed Salama

2 January 2020 11	Haras El Hodoud	1–0	Pyramids	Alexandria
14:30 CAT (UTC+2)	Sherweda 2'; El Zenary (yellow card) 30'; Grendo (yellow card) 42'; Samy (yellow card) 57'; Felix (yellow card) 84'	Report	Hamdy (yellow card) 90+4'; El Shenawy (yellow card) 90+4'	Stadium: Haras El Hodoud Stadium; Referee: Walid Abdel Razek

7 January 2020 12	Pyramids	1–0	Ismaily	Cairo
19:30 CAT (UTC+2)	El Gabbas 80'; Gaber (yellow card) 87'	Report	El Mohamady (yellow card) 5'; Abou El Yazid (yellow card) 32'; M. Magdy II (yellow card) 40'	Stadium: 30 June Stadium; Referee: Mohamed Maarouf

16 January 2020 13	Al Ittihad	1–1	Pyramids	Alexandria
19:30 CAT (UTC+2)	Anwar 51'; Rizk (yellow card) 64'	Report	El Said 14'; Soliman (yellow card) 45+3'; Dunga (yellow card) 75'; Gabr (yellow card) 85'	Stadium: Haras El Hodoud Stadium (Note: The Al Ittihad v Pyramids match was played at Haras El Hodoud Stadium instead of Alexandria Stadium, both in Alexandria, due to poor pitch condition.); Referee: Ibrahim Nour El Din
Note: Pyramids' goal is also accredited as an own goal by Emad El Sayed of Al Ittihad.

21 January 2020 14	Pyramids	3–1	Misr Lel Makkasa	Cairo
19:30 CAT (UTC+2)	El Said 20' (pen.), 45'; Dunga (yellow card) 40'; Gabr (yellow card) 78'; Hamdy (yellow card) 86', (goal) 87'	Report	Abdel Aziz (yellow card) 39'; Amin 78' (pen.)	Stadium: 30 June Stadium; Referee: Mahmoud El Banna

29 January 2020 15	FC Masr	1–2	Pyramids	Cairo
19:30 CAT (UTC+2)	Sultan 33'; Youssef (yellow card) 43' (yellow-red card) 67'; Saleh (yellow card) 45' (yellow-red card) 87'; Ibrahim (yellow card) 45+2'; Ouka (yellow card) 86' (yellow-red card) 86'	Report	El Said (yellow card) 39'; Dunga 44'; Issa 75'	Stadium: Cairo Military Academy Stadium; Referee: Tarek Magdy

6 February 2020 16	Pyramids	1–2	Al Ahly	Cairo
19:30 CAT (UTC+2)	Gabr 53'; Mansour (yellow card) 78' (yellow-red card) 90+3'; Issa (yellow card) 90+3'; Bakar (red card) 90+4'	Report	Maâloul (yellow card) 49'; Badji 77'; Ashraf (yellow card) 82'; Dieng 90+1'	Stadium: 30 June Stadium; Referee: Ibrahim Nour El Din

11 February 2020 17	Al Mokawloon Al Arab	0–2	Pyramids	Cairo
19:30 CAT (UTC+2)	Mostafa (yellow card) 37'; Jaziri (yellow card) 71'	Report	Hamdy 36'; Antwi 40'; Hamada (yellow card) 57'	Stadium: Osman Ahmed Osman Stadium; Referee: Mohamed Adel

11 March 2020 18	ENPPI	0–1	Pyramids	Cairo
17:00 CAT (UTC+2)			El Said (pen.), 86'	Stadium: Petro Sport Stadium

10 August 2020 19	Pyramids	3–0	Tanta	Cairo
18:30 CAT (UTC+2)	El Said (pen.), 49'; El Said (pen.), 58'; El Said 60'			Stadium: 30 June Stadium

20 March 2020 20	Pyramids	2–2	Tala'ea El Gaish	Cairo
19:30 CAT (UTC+2)	Mohamed El Gabbas 72'; Amor Layouni 82'		Nasser Mansi 1'; Ahmed Samy (pen.), 30'	Stadium: 30 June Stadium

21 August 2020 21	ENPPI	1–2	Pyramids	Alexandria
21:00 CAT (UTC+2)	Emomo Eddy Ngoy 49'		Ibrahim Adel 36'; Mohamed Nadi , 90+4' (o.g.)	Stadium: Alexandria Stadium

=== Egypt Cup ===
Pyramids entered the competition from the round of 32 and were given a home tie against Egyptian Second Division side Nogoom. The bracket of the tournament was also decided at the time of the round of 32 draw; meaning that the path to the final for each time was decided prior to playing any matches. Also, all matches are played on stadiums selected by the Egyptian Football Association starting from the round of 16.

5 December 2019 Round of 32	Pyramids	6–1	Nogoom	Cairo
19:30 CAT (UTC+2)	El Gabbas 19', 56'; Bakry (yellow card) 21', (goal) 75'; Hassan 44'; El Sayed 69' (o.g.); Antwi 84'	Report	El Tawila 14'; Talaat (yellow card) 20'	Stadium: 30 June Stadium; Referee: Amr Ayed

21 February 2020 Round of 16	Ismaily	0–1	Pyramids	Alexandria
17:00 CAT (UTC+2)	Hashem (yellow card) 38'; Abou El Yazid (yellow card) 53'	Report	Antwi 6', (yellow card) 55'; Bakry (yellow card) 45+2'; Dunga (yellow card) 60'; El Said (yellow card) 74'	Stadium: Alexandria Stadium; Referee: Amin Omar

Quarter-finals	Tala'ea El Gaish	v	Pyramids
--:-- CAT (UTC+2)

=== CAF Confederation Cup ===
Pyramids entered the competition for the first time in their history after finishing 3rd in the previous season of the league. Since it was the club's first appearance, Pyramids entered the competition from the preliminary round.

==== Preliminary round ====
The draw for the preliminary round was held on 21 July 2019. Pyramids were drawn against Étoile du Congo from Congo.

10 August 2019 First leg	Pyramids (Egypt)	4–1	(Republic of the Congo) Étoile du Congo	Cairo, Egypt
20:00 CAT (UTC+2)	Antwi 19', 33'; Traoré 22'; Mansour (yellow card) 49'; Ali 90+3' (pen.)	Report	Chancy (yellow card) 58'; Mukumbu 89'	Stadium: 30 June Stadium; Referee: Lyes Bekouassa (Algeria)

25 August 2019 Second leg	Étoile du Congo (Republic of the Congo)	0–1 (1–5 agg.)	(Egypt) Pyramids	Brazzaville, Congo
16:30 WAT (UTC+1)		Report	Issa 32'; Soliman (yellow card) 90'	Stadium: Stade Alphonse Massemba-Débat; Referee: Jean-Marc Ganamandji (Central African Republic)

==== First round ====
The draw for the first round was held on 21 July 2019 (after the preliminary round draw). Pyramids were drawn against the winner of the tie involving CR Belouizdad from Algeria and AS CotonTchad from Chad, which was won by the former.

14 September 2019 First leg	Pyramids (Egypt)	1–1	(Algeria) CR Belouizdad	Cairo, Egypt
20:00 CAT (UTC+2)	Gabr (yellow card) 56'; Farouk 75'	Report	Sayoud 65'	Stadium: 30 June Stadium; Referee: Janny Sikazwe (Zambia)

29 September 2019 Second leg	CR Belouizdad (Algeria)	0–1 (1–2 agg.)	(Egypt) Pyramids	Algiers, Algeria
17:45 WAT (UTC+1)		Report	Bakry (yellow card) 14'; Issa (yellow card) 26'; Antwi 56', (yellow card) 75'; El Shenawy (yellow card) 66'; Hamdy (yellow card) 66'; Traoré (yellow card) 80'	Stadium: Stade du 5 Juillet; Referee: Samir Guezzaz (Morocco)

==== Play-off round ====
The draw for the play-off round was held on 9 October 2019. Pyramids were drawn against Young Africans from Tanzania, who were transferred to the CAF Confederation Cup from the CAF Champions League after losing their tie in the first round.

27 October 2019 First leg	Young Africans (Tanzania)	1–2	(Egypt) Pyramids	Mwanza, Tanzania
16:00 EAT (UTC+3)	Makame (yellow card) 64'; Yondan (yellow card) 69' (yellow-red card) 90+3'; Tshishimbi 88'	Report	Traoré 42'; El Said 63'	Stadium: CCM Kirumba Stadium; Referee: Kalilou Traoré (Ivory Coast)

3 November 2019 Second leg	Pyramids (Egypt)	3–0 (5–1 agg.)	(Tanzania) Young Africans	Cairo, Egypt
20:00 CAT (UTC+2)	Traoré 28'; Farouk (yellow card) 41', (goal) 80'; El Said 90+5'	Report		Stadium: 30 June Stadium; Referee: Blaise Yuven Ngwa (Cameroon)

==== Group stage ====
The draw for the group stage was held on 12 November 2019. Pyramids were drawn in Group A alongside FC Nouadhibou from Mauritania, Enugu Rangers from Nigeria and fellow Egyptian side Al Masry.

Pos	Team	Pld	W	D	L	GF	GA	GD	Pts	Qualification
1	(Egypt) Pyramids	6	5	0	1	14	3	+11	15	Advance to knockout stage
2	(Egypt) Al-Masry	6	3	1	2	10	9	+1	10	Advance to knockout stage
3	(Nigeria) Enugu Rangers	6	1	3	2	6	9	−3	6	
4	(Mauritania) FC Nouadhibou	6	0	2	4	3	12	−9	2	

Source: CAF
Rules for classification: Tiebreakers

1 December 2019 1	Enugu Rangers (Nigeria)	1–3	(Egypt) Pyramids	Enugu, Nigeria
14:00 WAT (UTC+1)	Olawoyin 28'; Olusesi (yellow card) 41' (yellow-red card) 45+3'	Report	Farouk 54' (pen.); Layouni 83'; Issa 87' (pen.)	Stadium: Nnamdi Azikiwe Stadium; Referee: Souleiman Ahmed Djama (Djibouti)

8 December 2019 2	Pyramids (Egypt)	6–0	(Mauritania) FC Nouadhibou	Cairo, Egypt
21:00 CAT (UTC+2)	Farouk 10', 56'; Traoré 32', 84'; Antwi 52'; Kanon 75'	Report	Moustapha (yellow card) 12'	Stadium: 30 June Stadium; Referee: Hassan Corneh (Liberia)

29 December 2019 3	Al Masry (Egypt)	1–2	(Egypt) Pyramids	Alexandria, Egypt (Note: The Al Masry v Pyramids match was played at Alexandria Stadium in Alexandria instead of Al Masry Club Stadium in Port Said due to renovation process.)
18:00 CAT (UTC+2)	Ali (yellow card) 55'; Masoud (yellow card) 61'; Attia (yellow card) 64'; Simporé 72' (pen.)	Report	Mansour (yellow card) 24'; Antwi 54'; Tawfik (yellow card) 63'; El Gabbas 83'	Stadium: Alexandria Stadium; Referee: Haythem Guirat (Tunisia)

12 January 2020 4	Pyramids (Egypt)	2–0	(Egypt) Al Masry	Cairo, Egypt
18:00 CAT (UTC+2)	Traoré 21'; Issa (yellow card) 27'; Dunga 71'	Report	El Eraky (yellow card) 86'	Stadium: 30 June Stadium; Referee: Jean Ouattara (Burkina Faso)

26 January 2020 5	Pyramids (Egypt)	0–1	(Nigeria) Enugu Rangers	Cairo, Egypt
18:00 CAT (UTC+2)		Report	George 73'; Louté (yellow card) 90+1'	Stadium: Cairo International Stadium (Note: The Pyramids v Enugu Rangers match, originally scheduled to be played at 30 June Stadium, was played at Cairo International Stadium, both in Cairo, due to the former hosting the first African Para Games.); Referee: Ali Mohamed Adelaide (Comoros)

2 February 2020 6	FC Nouadhibou (Mauritania)	0–1	(Egypt) Pyramids	Cairo, Egypt (Note: The FC Nouadhibou v Pyramids match, originally scheduled to be played at Stade Cheikha Ould Boïdiya in Nouakchott, Mauritania, was played at 30 June Stadium in Cairo, Egypt, following request made by both clubs.)
18:00 CAT (UTC+2)	Yacoub (yellow card) 68'	Report	Antwi 59'; El Gabbas (yellow card) 90'	Stadium: 30 June Stadium; Referee: Sekou Ahmed Touré (Guinea)

==== Quarter-finals ====
The draw for the quarter-finals was held on 5 February 2020. Pyramids were drawn against Zanaco from Zambia.

1 March 2020 First leg	Zanaco (Zambia)	0–3	(Egypt) Pyramids	National Heroes Stadium, Lusaka
13:00 (15:00 UTC+2)		Report (Soccerway)	Gabr 18'; Farouk 24'; El Said 68' (pen.)	Referee: Andofetra Rakotojaona (Madagascar)

8 March 2020 Second leg	Pyramids (Egypt)	0–1	(Zambia) Zanaco	30 June Stadium, Cairo
13:00 (15:00 UTC+2)		Report (Soccerway)	Kola 45+1'	Referee: Eric Otogo-Castane (Gabon)

== Statistics ==
=== Appearances and goals ===
As of 21 February 2020

No.	Pos	Player	Egyptian Premier League		Egypt Cup		CAF Confederation Cup		Total	
No.	Pos	Player	Apps	Goals	Apps	Goals	Apps	Goals	Apps	Goals
1	GK	(Egypt) El Mahdy Soliman	11	0	1	0	4	0	16	0
2	DF	(Egypt) Ahmed Ayman Mansour	9	0	0	0	8+1	0	18	0
3	DF	(Egypt) Abdallah Bakry	9+2	0	2	1	7+1	0	21	1
4	DF	(Egypt) Omar Gaber	15	1	0	0	10+2	0	27	1
5	DF	(Egypt) Ali Gabr	10	1	1	0	8	0	19	1
6	MF	(Egypt) Mohamed Fathy	5+2	0	1	0	4+1	0	13	0
7	FW	(Burkina Faso) Eric Traoré	10+1	2	0+1	0	9	6	21	8
8	FW	(Egypt) Islam Issa	7+5	1	0	0	7+2	2	21	3
9	FW	(Ghana) John Antwi	12+4	2	1+1	2	6+4	6	28	10
10	FW	(Egypt) Ibrahim Hassan	8+2	1	2	1	4+3	0	19	2
11	DF	(Egypt) Tarek Taha	4	0	1+1	0	2	0	8	0
12	MF	(Egypt) Ahmed Tawfik	7+4	0	2	0	4+2	0	19	0
13	DF	(Egypt) Ragab Bakar	8+3	0	0	0	11+1	0	23	0
14	MF	(Egypt) Nabil Emad	12+2	1	1	0	9+1	1	25	2
15	MF	(Egypt) Mahmoud Hamada	4+1	0	1	0	1+3	0	10	0
16	GK	(Egypt) Ahmed El Shenawy	6	0	1	0	8	0	15	0
17	FW	(Egypt) Mohamed Farouk	7+3	3	0+1	0	5+2	5	18	8
18	FW	(Tunisia) Amor Layouni	2+7	0	1	0	2+2	1	14	1
19	MF	(Egypt) Abdallah El Said	14+1	12	1	0	8+1	2	25	14
20	DF	(Egypt) Mohamed Atwa	0	0	0	0	0	0	0	0
21	DF	(Egypt) Mohamed Hamdy	12+1	2	2	0	8+1	0	24	2
22	FW	(Uganda) Lumala Abdu	2+1	0	0	0	0	0	3	0
24	DF	(Ivory Coast) Wilfried Kanon	10+1	0	2	0	3	1	16	1
25	GK	(Egypt) Ahmed Daador	0	0	0	0	0	0	0	0
26	FW	(Egypt) Mohamed El Gabbas	3+10	1	1+1	2	3+5	1	23	4
33	MF	(Egypt) Mahmoud Abdel Kader	0	0	0	0	0	0	0	0
35	MF	(Egypt) Ibrahim Adel	0	0	1	0	0+2	0	3	0
37	FW	(Egypt) Hossam Ghanem	0	0	0	0	0	0	0	0
Players transferred out during the season
23	FW	(Egypt) Ahmed Ali	0+1	0	0	0	1+1	1	3	1

=== Goalscorers ===
As of 21 February 2020

Rank	Position	Name	Egyptian Premier League	Egypt Cup	CAF Confederation Cup	Total
1	MF	(Egypt) Abdallah El Said	12	0	2	14
2	FW	(Ghana) John Antwi	2	2	6	10
3	FW	(Egypt) Mohamed Farouk	3	0	5	8
3	FW	(Burkina Faso) Eric Traoré	2	0	6	8
5	FW	(Egypt) Mohamed El Gabbas	1	2	1	4
6	FW	(Egypt) Islam Issa	1	0	2	3
7	MF	(Egypt) Nabil Emad	1	0	1	2
7	DF	(Egypt) Mohamed Hamdy	2	0	0	2
7	FW	(Egypt) Ibrahim Hassan	1	1	0	2
10	FW	(Egypt) Ahmed Ali	0	0	1	1
10	DF	(Egypt) Abdallah Bakry	0	1	0	1
10	DF	(Egypt) Omar Gaber	1	0	0	1
10	DF	(Egypt) Ali Gabr	1	0	0	1
10	DF	(Ivory Coast) Wilfried Kanon	0	0	1	1
10	FW	(Tunisia) Amor Layouni	0	0	1	1
Own goal			0	1	0	1
Total			27	7	26	60

=== Clean sheets ===
As of 21 February 2020

Rank	Name	Egyptian Premier League	Egypt Cup	CAF Confederation Cup	Total
1	(Egypt) El Mahdy Soliman	3	1	3	7
2	(Egypt) Ahmed El Shenawy	2	0	3	5
Total		5	1	6	12
