= 2022–23 Pyramids FC season =

Pyramids FC
2022–23 season
- Owner: Salem Al Shamsi
- CEO: Mamdouh Eid
- Manager: Takis Gonias (until 4 January); Jaime Pacheco (from 5 January)
- Stadium: 30 June Stadium
- Egyptian Premier League: 2nd
- Egypt Cup: Semi-finals
- EFA Cup: Round of 16
- CAF Confederation Cup: Quarter-finals
- Top goalscorer: League: Fagrie Lakay (10); All: Mostafa Fathi (15)
- Biggest win: Pyramids 7–0 Hilal Alsahil
- Biggest defeat: Al Ahly 3–0 Pyramids
Home colours	Away colours	Third colours

The 2022–23 Pyramids FC season was the club's fifth season in existence and the fifth consecutive season in the top flight of Egyptian football. In addition to the domestic league, Pyramids participated in this season's editions of the Egypt Cup, the EFA Cup and the CAF Confederation Cup.

== Overview ==
About eight months after being hired, Pyramids fired coach Takis Gonias following a third heavy defeat.

== Kits ==
Supplier: Puma / Main sponsor: MyWhoosh

Home	Away	Third

== Players ==
=== First-team squad ===
As of 29 January 2022

Note: Flags indicate national team as defined under FIFA eligibility rules; some limited exceptions apply. Players may hold more than one non-FIFA nationality.

No.	Pos.	Nation	Player
1	GK	EGY	El Mahdy Soliman
3	DF	EGY	Ahmed Ayman Mansour
4	DF	EGY	Omar Gaber (vice-captain)
5	DF	EGY	Ali Gabr (3rd captain)
6	DF	EGY	Osama Galal
7	FW	BFA	Eric Traoré
8	FW	EGY	Islam Issa
9	FW	PLE	Mahmoud Wadi
10	FW	EGY	Ramadan Sobhi
11	MF	EGY	Mohamed Sadek
12	DF	EGY	Ahmed Tawfik
14	MF	EGY	Nabil Emad
15	MF	BFA	Blati Touré
16	GK	EGY	Ahmed El Shenawy
17	MF	EGY	Hesham Mohamed
18	MF	MAR	Walid El Karti

No.	Pos.	Nation	Player
19	MF	EGY	Abdallah El Said (captain)
20	FW	EGY	Abdallah Magdy
21	DF	EGY	Mohamed Hamdy
22	GK	EGY	Sherif Ekramy
23	FW	RSA	Fagrie Lakay
24	DF	EGY	Ahmed Fathy
25	DF	EGY	Ahmed Samy
26	FW	EGY	Mohamed El Gabbas
27	DF	EGY	Hussein El Sayed
28	FW	TUN	Fakhreddine Ben Youssef
30	FW	EGY	Ibrahim Adel
33	MF	EGY	Mahmoud Saber
35	MF	EGY	Ahmad Fawzi
39	DF	EGY	Abdo Semida
—	MF	EGY	Mostafa Fathi (on loan from Al-Taawoun)

=== Out on loan ===
Note: Flags indicate national team as defined under FIFA eligibility rules; some limited exceptions apply. Players may hold more than one non-FIFA nationality.

No.	Pos.	Nation	Player
—	GK	EGY	Ahmed Daadour (Eastern Company SC until 30 June 2022)
—	FW	GHA	John Antwi (at Tala'ea El Gaish until 30 June 2022)

== Transfers ==
=== In ===
No.	Pos	Player	Transferred from	Fee	Date	Source
11	MF	(Egypt) Mostafa Fathi	(Saudi Arabia) Al-Taawoun	Loan	16 September 2022	
13	MF	(Egypt) Mahmoud Abdel Aati	(Egypt) Ismaily	Free	17 September 2022	
	DF	(Egypt) Abdel Rahman Gouda	(Egypt) Al Nasr	Undisclosed	11 October 2022	

=== Out ===
No.	Pos	Player	Transferred to	Fee	Date	Source
12	DF	(Egypt) Ahmed Tawfik	(Egypt) National Bank	Free	1 September 2022	
	MF	(Egypt) Ibrahim Hassan	(Egypt) Al Ittihad	€158,000	6 September 2022	
27	DF	(Egypt) Hussein El Sayed	(Egypt) Al Masry	Undisclosed	13 September 2022	
4	DF	(Egypt) Omar Gaber	(Egypt) Zamalek	Undisclosed	19 September 2022	
14	MF	(Egypt) Nabil Emad	(Egypt) Zamalek	Undisclosed	21 September 2022	
	FW	(Egypt) Salah El Deen Yehia	(Egypt) El Dakhleya		29 September 2022	
7	MF	(Burkina Faso) Eric Traoré	(Egypt) ENPPI	Loan	10 October 2022	
9	FW	(Palestine) Mahmoud Wadi	(Egypt) Tala'ea El Gaish	Loan	15 January 2023	

== Pre-season and friendlies ==
Win Draw Loss Fixtures

Pyramids held a training camp in Dubai, UAE from 24 September to 3 October.

28 September 2022 Friendly	Gulf United (United Arab Emirates)	0–3	(Egypt) Pyramids	Dubai, United Arab Emirates
18:45		Report	Ben Youssef; El Gabbas	Stadium: The Sevens Stadium

2 October 2022 Friendly	Royal FC (United Arab Emirates)	1–12	(Egypt) Pyramids	Dubai, United Arab Emirates
		Report	Fathi; Ben Youssef; Wadi; Sobhi; El Karti; Chibi; El Gabbas; Issa; Saber	Stadium: The Sevens Stadium

9 October 2022 Friendly	Pyramids (Egypt)	4–0	(Egypt) Qutour	Cairo, Egypt
	Issa; El Gabbas	Report		Stadium: 30 June Stadium

16 November 2022 Friendly	Pyramids (Egypt)	1–0	(Egypt) Ceramica Cleopatra	Cairo, Egypt
	Magdy	Report		Stadium: 30 June Stadium

== Competitions ==
=== Overview ===
Competition	First match	Last match	Starting round	Final position	Record							
Competition	First match	Last match	Starting round	Final position	Pld	W	D	L	GF	GA	GD	Win %
Egyptian Premier League	19 October 2022	23 July 2023	Matchday 1	2nd	34	22	7	5	58	24	+34	64.71
Egypt Cup	17 May 2023	3 July 2023	Round of 32		4	3	1	0	9	3	+6	75.00
EFA Cup	26 March 2023		Round of 16	Round of 16	1	0	1	0	1	1	+0	0.00
CAF Confederation Cup	8 October 2022	30 April 2023	Second round	Quarter-finals	12	6	3	3	24	8	+16	50.00
Total					51	31	12	8	92	36	+56	60.78

Source: Soccerway

=== Egyptian Premier League ===
==== League table ====
Pos	Team	Pld	W	D	L	GF	GA	GD	Pts	Qualification or relegation
1	Al Ahly (C)	34	25	8	1	63	13	+50	83	Qualification for the Champions League second round
2	Pyramids	34	22	7	5	58	24	+34	73	Qualification for the Champions League second round
3	Zamalek	34	17	9	8	52	36	+16	60	Qualification for the Confederation Cup second round (Note: Since the 2022–23 Egypt Cup wouldn't finish by the CAF deadline for associations to submit teams participating in next season's African competitions, the spot awarded to the Egypt Cup winners (Confederation Cup first or second round) was passed to the fourth-placed team in the league.)
4	Future	34	15	13	6	34	23	+11	58	Qualification for the Confederation Cup second round
5	Al Masry	34	11	15	8	34	33	+1	48	

Source: Soccerway
Rules for classification: 1) Points; 2) Head-to-head points; 3) Head-to-head goal difference; 4) Goal difference; 5) Goals scored; 6) Play-off.
(C) Champions

==== Results summary ====
Overall								Home						Away					
Pld	W	D	L	GF	GA	GD	Pts	W	D	L	GF	GA	GD	W	D	L	GF	GA	GD
34	22	7	5	58	24	+34	73	14	3	0	39	9	+30	8	4	5	19	15	+4

Source: worldfootball

==== Results by round ====
Round	1	2	3	4	5	6	7	8	9	10	11	12	13	14	15	16	17	18	19	20	21	22	23	24	25	26	27	28	29	30	31	32	33	34
Ground	A	H	A	H	A	H	A	H	A	H	A	H	A	H	A	H	A	H	A	H	A	H	A	H	A	H	A	H	A	H	A	H	A	H
Result	D	D	L	W	W	W	W	W	L	W	L	W	D	W	W	D	W	W	D	D	L	W	D	W	W	W	W	W	W	W	W	W	L	W
Position	6	10	12	9	6	5	5	4	5	4	4	4	4	3	3	2	2	2	2	2	3	2	3	2	2	2	2	2	2	2	2	2	2	2

Source: worldfootball
A = Away; H = Home; W = Win; D = Draw; L = Loss

==== Matches ====
The league fixtures were announced on 9 October 2022.

19 October 2022 1	ENPPI	1–1	Pyramids	Cairo
17:00 EST (UTC+2)	Kabou (yellow card) 3', (goal) 58'; Naser (yellow card) 69'	Report	Fathi 20'; Galal (yellow card) 39'; Adel (yellow card) 79'	Stadium: Petrosport Stadium; Referee: Amin Omar

23 October 2022 2	Pyramids	0–0	Al Masry	Cairo
16:00 EST (UTC+2)	El Karti (red card) 44'; Sobhi (yellow card) 45+3'	Report	Dabash (yellow card) 72'	Stadium: 30 June Stadium; Referee: Tarek Magdy

23 November 2022 4	Pyramids	2–0	National Bank	Cairo
17:00 EST (UTC+2)	Fathi 73'; Saber 75'	Report	Yassin (yellow card) 45+5' (yellow-red card) 90+2'; Mohamed (yellow card) 87'	Stadium: 30 June Stadium; Referee: Ibrahim Nour El Din

30 November 2022 5	Haras El Hodoud	0–1	Pyramids	Alexandria
14:45 EST (UTC+2)	Al Qadi (yellow card) 53'	Report	Hafez (yellow card) 13'; Chibi (yellow card) 45+1'; Lakay 54' (pen.); Magdy (yellow card) 71'	Stadium: Haras El Hodoud Stadium; Referee: Mohamed Al Ghazi

7 December 2022 6	Pyramids	2–0	Al Mokawloon Al Arab	Cairo
14:45 EST (UTC+2)	Sobhi 33'; Touré (yellow card) 79'; Issa (yellow card) 83'; Ben Youssef 87' (pen.)	Report	Alaa (yellow card) 69'; El Sayed (yellow card) 84'; Abed (yellow card) 86'	Stadium: 30 June Stadium; Referee: Mohamed Salama

11 December 2022 3	Zamalek	1–0	Pyramids	Cairo
19:00 EST (UTC+2)	Shalaby 4'; Mathlouthi (yellow card) 49'; Akinyoola (yellow card) 85'	Report	Chibi (yellow card) 27'	Stadium: Cairo International Stadium; Referee: Ibrahim Nour El Din

16 December 2022 7	Ismaily	1–2	Pyramids	Ismailia
14:45 EST (UTC+2)	El Mohamady (yellow card) 17'; Annor 32', (yellow card) 83'; Hassan (yellow card) 42'	Report	Sobhi 9', (yellow card) 32'; Issa 13'; Sadek (yellow card) 43'	Stadium: Ismailia Stadium; Referee: Abdelaziz El Sayed

19 December 2022 8	Pyramids	2–1	Aswan	Cairo
19:00 EST (UTC+2)	Hafez (yellow card) 29'; Sadek (yellow card) 32'; Fathi 52'; Hamdy 64'; Chibi (yellow card) 75'	Report	Nagy (yellow card) 45'; Fathi (yellow card) 88'; Kamone 90+3'; Atwa (yellow card) 90+7'	Stadium: 30 June Stadium; Referee: Wael Farhan

23 December 2022 9	El Dakhleya	2–1	Pyramids	Cairo
19:00 EST (UTC+2)	Atef (yellow card) 53'; Ahmed 73', 78'; El Sayed (yellow card) 90+4'	Report	Lakay 57'; Galal (yellow card) 77'	Stadium: Petrosport Stadium; Referee: Sobhy El Amrawi

27 December 2022 10	Pyramids	3–0	Al Ittihad	Cairo
17:00 EST (UTC+2)	Magdy (yellow card) 31'; Sobhi (penalty missed) 39'; Galal 45+3'; Lakay 58'; Saleh 85' (o.g.)	Report	Alaa (yellow card) 38'; Attia (yellow card) 64'	Stadium: 30 June Stadium; Referee: Mohammed Yousef

2 January 2023 11	Al Ahly	3–0	Pyramids	Cairo
19:00 EST (UTC+2)	El Solia 19', 69'; Samy 90+4' (o.g.)	Report	Chibi (yellow card) 64'	Stadium: Cairo International Stadium; Referee: Szymon Marciniak (Poland)
Note: The match originally scheduled to be played at Al Ahly WE Al Salam Stadium was moved at the request of Al Ahly.

7 January 2023 12	Pyramids	4–0	Ghazl El Mahalla	Cairo
14:45 EST (UTC+2)	Sobhi 41'; Touré 44'; Hamdy (yellow card) 65'; Lakay 67'; Adel 80'	Report	Samir (yellow card) 40'	Stadium: 30 June Stadium; Referee: Mohamed Salama

11 January 2023 13	Future	1–1	Pyramids	Cairo
19:00 EST (UTC+2)	Reda 21' (pen.); Rizk (yellow card) 38'; Hafez (yellow card) 90+5'	Report	Adel (yellow card) 40', (goal) 80'; Lakay (yellow card) 52'; El Said (yellow card) 90+4' (yellow-red card) 90+4'; El Shenawy (yellow card) 90+5'	Stadium: Al Salam Stadium; Referee: Mohamed Maarouf

19 January 2023 14	Pyramids	3–0	Pharco	Cairo
19:00 EST (UTC+2)	Fathy (yellow card) 43'; Fathi 45'; Adel 45+4'; Lakay (yellow card) 72'; Issa 90+3'	Report	Hamada (yellow card) 62'; Saeed (red card) 88'	Stadium: 30 June Stadium; Referee: Amin Omar

24 January 2023 15	Smouha	1–2	Pyramids	Alexandria
19:00 EST (UTC+2)	Gamal (yellow card) 28'; Faisal 30'; Boateng (yellow card) 69'	Report	Sobhi 16', (yellow card) 69'; Fathi 56'; Abdelaati (yellow card) 75'; Galal (red card) 84'; Fathy (yellow card) 87'	Stadium: Alexandria Stadium; Referee: Mohamed El Hanafi

29 January 2023 16	Pyramids	2–2	Ceramica Cleopatra	Cairo
19:00 EST (UTC+2)	Sobhi 18' (pen.); Samy (red card) 34'; Said 58'	Report	Ramadan (yellow card) 14'; Gaber (yellow card) 23'; Ibrahim 35' (pen.); Antar (yellow card) 80'; Mohsen 90', (yellow card) 90+10'	Stadium: 30 June Stadium; Referee: Sobhy El Amrawi

7 February 2023 17	Tala'ea El Gaish	0–1	Pyramids	Cairo
17:00 EST (UTC+2)		Report	Ben Youssef 45+2'	Stadium: Gehaz El Reyada Stadium; Referee: Mohamed Adel

16 February 2023 18	Pyramids	2–1	ENPPI	Cairo
19:00 EST (UTC+2)	Sobhi 24'; Hamdy 67'	Report	Kabou 13'	Stadium: 30 June Stadium; Referee: Abdelaziz El Sayed

22 February 2023 19	Al Masry	0–0	Pyramids	Borg El Arab
19:00 EST (UTC+2)		Report		Stadium: Borg El Arab Stadium; Referee: Wael Farhan

3 March 2023 20	Pyramids	0–0	Zamalek	Cairo
19:00 EST (UTC+2)		Report		Stadium: 30 June Stadium; Referee: Mohamed Adel

13 March 2023 21	National Bank	2–1	Pyramids	Cairo
18:00 EST (UTC+2)	Fathi 20'; Kaoud 81'	Report	Ben Youssef 70'	Stadium: Osman Ahmed Osman Stadium; Referee: Mohamed Al Kalawy

5 April 2023 23	Al Mokawloon Al Arab	0–0	Pyramids	Cairo
21:15 EST (UTC+2)		Report	Fathi (penalty missed) 32'	Stadium: Osman Ahmed Osman Stadium; Referee: Ahmed Hamdi

14 April 2023 25	Aswan	0–3	Pyramids	Aswan
21:15 EST (UTC+2)		Report	Lakay 31', 90+1' (pen.); Touré 90+3'	Stadium: Aswan Stadium; Referee: Tarek Magdy

18 April 2023 26	Pyramids	2–0	El Dakhleya	Cairo
21:15 EST (UTC+2)	Abdel Naby 90' (o.g.); Gabr 90+4'	Report		Stadium: 30 June Stadium; Referee: Mahmoud Ashour

9 May 2023 24	Pyramids	3–1	Ismaily	Cairo
19:00 EST (UTC+3)	El Karti 14'; Issa 40'; Ben Youssef 77'	Report	Shabrawy 67'	Stadium: 30 June Stadium; Referee: Tarek Magdy
Note: The game, which was initially slated for 10 April 2023, was postponed.

21 May 2023 29	Ghazl El Mahalla	0–2	Pyramids	El Mahalla El Kubra
21:30 EST (UTC+3)		Report	Issa 29'; El Karti 45+2'	Stadium: Ghazl El Mahalla Stadium; Referee: Hisham Al-Falal

24 May 2023 22	Pyramids	1–0	Haras El Hodoud	Cairo
21:30 EST (UTC+3)	Lakay (penalty missed) 58'; El Gabbas 90+4'	Report		Stadium: 30 June Stadium; Referee: Ibrahim Nour El Din
Note: The game, which was initially slated for 14 March 2023, was postponed.

29 May 2023 27	Al Ittihad	1–2	Pyramids	Alexandria
18:00 EST (UTC+3)	Hamdi 22'	Report	Adel 19'; Lakay 71'	Stadium: Alexandria Stadium; Referee: Abdelaziz El Sayed
Note: The game, which was initially slated for 25 April 2023, was postponed. Rescheduled for 5 May but postponed again due to the 2021–22 Super Cup.

2 June 2023 30	Pyramids	1–0	Future	Cairo
21:30 EST (UTC+3)	Fathi 66'	Report		Stadium: 30 June Stadium; Referee: Tarek Magdy

6 June 2023 31	Pharco	0–1	Pyramids	Borg El Arab
19:00 EST (UTC+3)	Hamroune (penalty missed) 38'	Report	Fathi 61'	Stadium: Borg El Arab Stadium; Referee: Mohamed El Hanafi

28 June 2023 32	Pyramids	5–2	Smouha	Cairo
21:30 EST (UTC+3)	Lakay 34', 78'; Issa 45+6'; Touré 54'; Fathi 57'	Report	Hakam 27'; Ougola 30'	Stadium: 30 June Stadium; Referee: Mohamed Al Kalawy

10 July 2023 33	Ceramica Cleopatra	2–1	Pyramids	Cairo
20:30 EST (UTC+3)	Mohsen 45+2', 83'	Report	Hafez 37'	Stadium: Osman Ahmed Osman Stadium; Referee: Mahmoud Ashour

14 July 2023 34	Pyramids	4–2	Tala'ea El Gaish	Cairo
20:30 EST (UTC+3)	Magdy 25'; Hafez 34'; Fathallah 45' (o.g.); Saber 57'	Report	Badr 13'; Mansour 70'	Stadium: 30 June Stadium; Referee: Nader Qamar Al-Dawla

23 July 2023 28	Pyramids	3–0	Al Ahly	Cairo
20:30 EST (UTC+3)	Abdelmonem 39' (o.g.); Lakay 77'; Fathi 90+1'	Report	El Shahat (penalty missed) 90+10'	Stadium: 30 June Stadium; Referee: Mahmoud Nagi
Note: The game, which was initially slated for 13 May 2023, was postponed.

=== Egypt Cup ===
17 May 2023 Round of 32	Pyramids	2–0	Raya Ghazl	Cairo
18:00 EST (UTC+3)	Fathi 15', 85'; Hafez (penalty missed) 18'			Stadium: 30 June Stadium; Referee: Hosni Sultan

22 June 2023 Round of 16	Al Ittihad	0–1	Pyramids	Alexandria
18:30 EST (UTC+3)			Ben Youssef 90+6'	Stadium: Alexandria Stadium; Referee: Mohamed Youssef

3 July 2023 Quarter-finals	National Bank	0–3	Pyramids	Cairo
20:30 EST (UTC+3)			Issa 3', 60'; Lakay 45+7' (pen.)	Stadium: Cairo International Stadium; Referee: Mahmoud Bassiouny

The semi-finals took place during the 2023–24 season.

=== EFA Cup ===
26 March 2023 Round of 16	Pyramids	1–1 (5–6 p)	ENPPI	Cairo
21:15 EST (UTC+2)	Hafez 89'		Naser 85'	Stadium: 30 June Stadium; Referee: Mohamed El Atabani
	Penalties
	El Said (penalty scored); El Karti (penalty scored); Hafez (penalty missed); Tawfik (penalty scored); Samy (penalty scored); Fathy (penalty scored); Chibi (penalty missed)		(penalty scored) Fawzi; (penalty missed) Yousef; (penalty scored) Hamed; (penalty scored) Aoufa; (penalty scored) Kalousha; (penalty scored) Zayed
Note: The match was postponed for one day due to the 30 June stadium hosting the Egypt and Malawi match in the 2023 African Cup of Nations qualifiers.

=== CAF Confederation Cup ===
==== Qualifying rounds ====
The draw for the qualifying rounds was held on 9 August 2022.

===== Second round =====
8 October 2022 First leg	Hilal Alsahil (Sudan)	0–2	(Egypt) Pyramids	Cairo, Egypt
18:00 UTC+2		Report	Ben Youssef 7'; Fathi 77'	Stadium: 30 June Stadium; Referee: Jean Claude Ishimwe (Rwanda)

15 October 2022 Second leg	Pyramids (Egypt)	7–0 (9–0 agg.)	(Sudan) Hilal Alsahil	Cairo, Egypt
18:00 UTC+2	Samy 4'; Ben Youssef 15', 18', 25'; Issa 23'; Sobhi 27'; Chibi 65'	Report		Stadium: 30 June Stadium; Referee: Noureddine El Jaafari (Morocco)

===== Play-off round =====
2 November 2022 First leg	ASN Nigelec (Niger)	1–0	(Egypt) Pyramids	Niamey, Niger
16:30 UTC+1	Seyni 58'	Report		Stadium: Stade Général Seyni Kountché; Referee: Omar Artan (Somalia)

9 November 2022 Second leg	Pyramids (Egypt)	3–0 (3–1 agg.)	(Niger) ASN Nigelec	Cairo, Egypt
19:00 UTC+2	El Karti 24'; El Said 48'; Lakay 56'	Report		Stadium: Cairo International Stadium; Referee: Boubou Traoré (Mali)

==== Group stage ====
The draw for the group stage was held on 12 December 2022.

Pos	Team	Pld	W	D	L	GF	GA	GD	Pts	Qualification	FAR	PFC	ASK	FUT
1	(Morocco) ASFAR	6	4	2	0	14	4	+10	14	Advance to knockout stage	—	1–0	5–1	2–0
2	(Egypt) Pyramids	6	3	2	1	11	5	+6	11	Advance to knockout stage	2–2	—	1–0	3–0 (Note: Awarded)
3	(Togo) ASKO Kara	6	1	1	4	6	14	−8	4 (Note: Head-to-head points: ASKO Kara 3, Future 3. Head-to-head goal difference: ASKO Kara 0, Future 0. Head-to-head goals scored: ASKO Kara 3, Future 3. Head-to-head away goals scored: ASKO Kara 3, Future 3. Goal difference: ASKO Kara -8, Future -8. Goals scored: ASKO Kara 6, Future 4)		1–1	1–4	—	0–3 (Note: Awarded)
4	(Egypt) Future	6	1	1	4	4	12	−8	4		0–3 (Note: Awarded)	1–1	0–3 (Note: Awarded)	—

Source: CAF
Rules for classification: Group stage tiebreakers
Notes:

12 February 2023 1	Pyramids (Egypt)	2–2	(Morocco) ASFAR	Cairo, Egypt
21:00 UTC+2	Fathi 1'; El Said 75'	Report	Diney 25'; Sahd 73'	Stadium: 30 June Stadium; Referee: Mutaz Ibrahim (Libya)

19 February 2023 2	Future (Egypt)	1–1	(Egypt) Pyramids	Cairo, Egypt
18:00 UTC+2	Mohamed 53'	Report	Hamdy 7'	Stadium: Al Salam Stadium; Referee: Mustapha Ghorbal (Algeria)

26 February 2023 3	Pyramids (Egypt)	1–0	(Togo) ASKO Kara	Cairo, Egypt
18:00 UTC+2	Ben Youssef 28'	Report		Stadium: 30 June Stadium; Referee: Messie Jessie Oved Nkounkou (Congo)

8 March 2023 4	ASKO Kara (Togo)	1–4	(Egypt) Pyramids	Lomé, Togo
16:00 UTC+0	Tchoutchoui 66'	Report	Ben Youssef 3'; Fathi 26', 36'; Issa 64'	Stadium: Stade de Kégué; Referee: Celso Armindo Alvação (Mozambique)

19 March 2023 5	ASFAR (Morocco)	1–0	(Egypt) Pyramids	Rabat, Morocco
19:00 UTC+0	Hammoudan 61'	Report		Stadium: Prince Moulay Abdellah Stadium; Referee: Daniel Nii Laryea (Ghana)

2 April 2023 6	Pyramids (Egypt)	2–1	(Egypt) Future	Cairo, Egypt
22:00 UTC+2	Gabr 15'; El Said 52'	Report	Atef 90+3'	Stadium: 30 June Stadium; Referee: Issa Sy (Senegal)
Note: Due to a mistake in Ahmed Refaat registration, Future was ruled forfeited in all matches in which this player participated.

==== Quarter-finals ====
The draw for the quarter-finals was held on 5 April 2023.

23 April 2023 First leg	Pyramids (Egypt)	1–1	(South Africa) Marumo Gallants	Cairo, Egypt
18:00 UTC+2	Sobhi 90+2' (pen.)	Report	Chivaviro 55'	Stadium: 30 June Stadium; Referee: Ibrahim Kalilou Traore (Ivory Coast)

30 April 2023 Second leg	Marumo Gallants (South Africa)	1–0 (2–1 agg.)	(Egypt) Pyramids	Johannesburg, South Africa
18:00 UTC+2	Ngema 39'	Report		Stadium: Dobsonville Stadium; Referee: Pierre Atcho (Gabon)

== Goalscorers ==
Updated as of 23 July 2023.

Rank	Pos.	No.	Player	Premier League	Cup	League Cup	Confederation Cup	Total
1	FW	11	(Egypt) Mostafa Fathi	9	2	0	4	15
2	FW	23	(South Africa) Fagrie Lakay	10	1	0	1	12
3	FW	28	(Tunisia) Fakhreddine Ben Youssef	4	1	0	5	10
4	FW	8	(Egypt) Islam Issa	5	2	0	2	9
5	MF	10	(Egypt) Ramadan Sobhi	6	0	0	2	8
Total				58	6	1	24	89
