= 2019 Egypt Cup final =

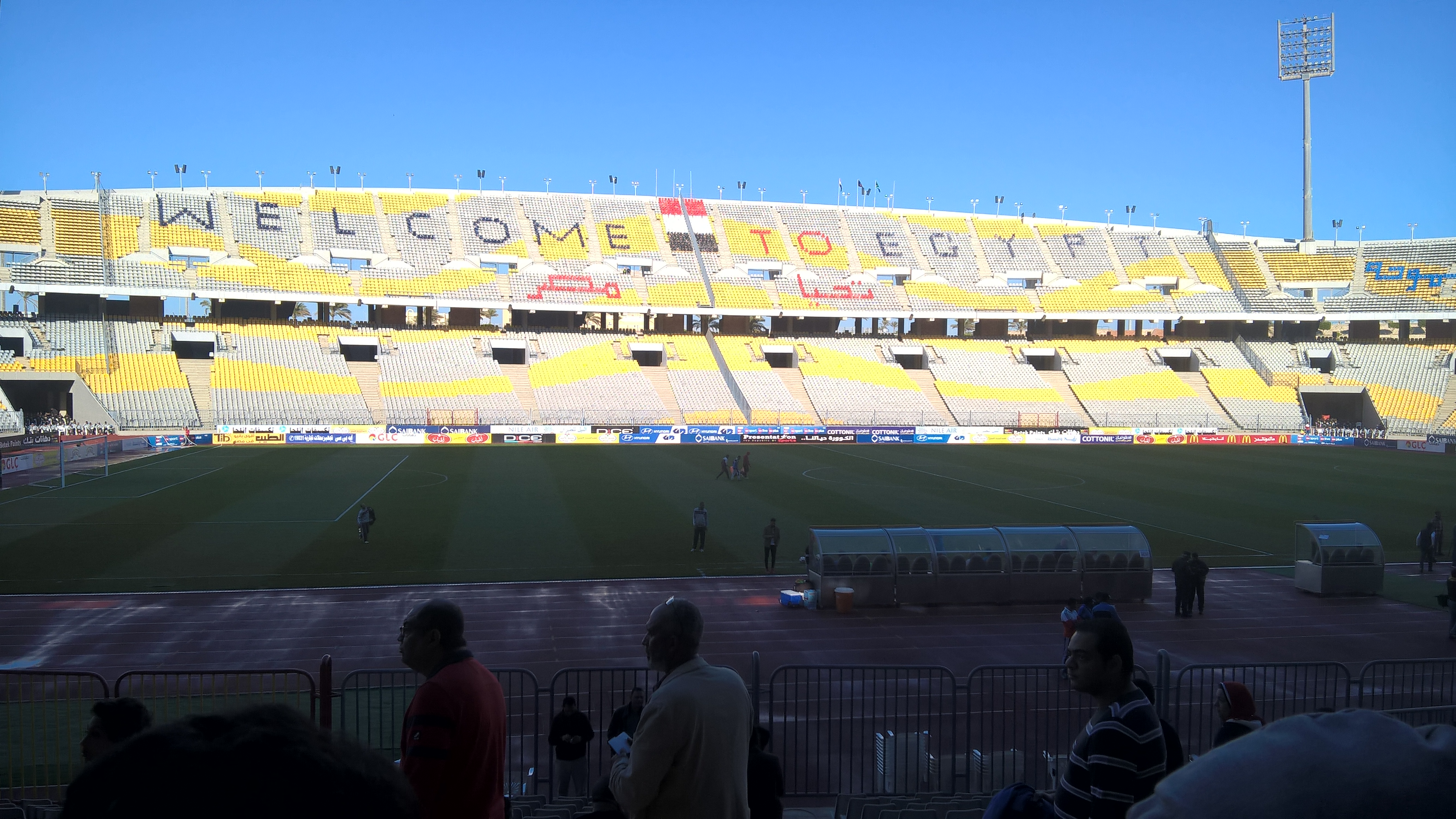
- Borg El Arab Stadium hosted the final
- Event: 2018–19 Egypt Cup
Pyramids	Zamalek
0	3
- Date: 8 September 2019
- Venue: Borg El Arab Stadium, Alexandria
- Man of the Match: Mahmoud Shikabala (Zamalek)
- Referee: Radu Petrescu (Romania)
- Attendance: 20,000
- Weather: Partly cloudy 26 °C (79 °F); 69% humidity

The 2019 Egypt Cup final was the 87th Egypt Cup Final, the final match of the 2018–19 Egypt Cup, Africa's oldest football cup competition. It was played at Borg El Arab Stadium in Alexandria, Egypt, on 8 September 2019, contested by Pyramids and Zamalek. Zamalek won the match 3–0, with two goals from Achraf Bencharki and one from Youssef Obama. Zamalek won the competition for the 2nd consecutive time and for the 6th time in the previous 7 editions. Since both finalists qualified to an African competition based on their league rankings, the spot awarded to the winners (2019–20 CAF Confederation Cup preliminary or first round) was passed to the fourth-placed team in the league, Al Masry. Zamalek also earned the right to play the 2018–19 Egyptian Premier League champions Al Ahly for the 2019–20 Egyptian Super Cup.

== Route to the final ==
In all results below, the score of the finalist is given first. From the round of 16, all matches were played on neutral grounds.

=== Pyramids ===
Round	Opposition	Score
R32	Tanta	3–2
R16	Al Ahly	1–0
QF	Haras El Hodoud	2–0
SF	Petrojet	2–0

As an Egyptian Premier League club, Pyramids started in the round of 32 where they were drawn with Egyptian Second Division team Tanta. Pyramids won 3–2 with two goals from Keno and one from Mohamed Magdy. In the round of 16, they drew fellow Egyptian Premier League team Al Ahly and won 1–0 with Eric Traoré scoring the only goal of the game. In the quarter-finals, they were drawn with Egyptian Premier League side Haras El Hodoud and won 2–0 with both goals coming from John Antwi. In the semi-finals, they were drawn with Egyptian Premier League side Petrojet and progressed to the final after a 2–0 win with Traoré and Ibrahim Hassan on the scoresheet.

=== Zamalek ===
Round	Opposition	Score
R32	MS Minyat Samanoud	1–0
R16	El Entag El Harby	2–0 (a.e.t.)
QF	Misr Lel Makkasa	1–0
SF	Al Ittihad	1–0 (a.e.t.)

As an Egyptian Premier League club, Zamalek also started in the round of 32. They were drawn at home against Egyptian Third Division side MS Minyat Samanoud. Zamalek won 1–0 with a late goal from Ibrahim Hassan. In the round of 16, they drew fellow Egyptian Premier League team El Entag El Harby and won 2–0 at extra time courtesy of Mahmoud Alaa and Mahmoud Abdel Aziz. In the quarter-finals, they played against fellow Egyptian Premier League side Misr Lel Makkasa and won 1–0 thanks to an early strike by Abdallah Gomaa. In the semi-finals, they were drawn against Egyptian Premier League side Al Ittihad and progressed to the final after a 1–0 extra time win with Mostafa Mohamed scoring the only goal of the game.

== Pre-game ==
After missing their chance in reaching the final last season by losing to Smouha on penalties, Pyramids qualified to the Egypt Cup final this season for the first time in their history. Zamalek reached the final for the 40th time in their history and for the 4th time in the previous 5 seasons; winning all 4 of them.

The Egyptian Football Association confirmed that at least 20,000 tickets will be available to purchase, but didn't confirm the number each club received. Tickets were priced E£75, E£300 and E£750, with concessions in place.

== Match ==
8 September 2019
20:00 CAT

Pyramids	0–3	Zamalek
	Report	Obama 52'; Bencharki 63', 83'

Borg El Arab Stadium, Alexandria
Attendance: 20,000
Referee: Radu Petrescu (Romania)

Pyramids	Zamalek

GK	16	(Egypt) Ahmed El Shenawy
LB	21	(Egypt) Mohamed Hamdy	(yellow card) 66'
CB	5	(Egypt) Ali Gabr
CB	2	(Egypt) Ahmed Ayman Mansour
RB	13	(Egypt) Ragab Bakar
CM	14	(Egypt) Nabil Emad	(yellow card) 90+2'
CM	8	(Egypt) Islam Issa		(substituted off) 73'
AM	10	(Egypt) Ibrahim Hassan		(substituted off) 63'
LW	28	(Burkina Faso) Eric Traoré
RW	19	(Egypt) Abdallah El Said (c)
CF	9	(Ghana) John Antwi		(substituted off) 73'
Substitutes:
GK	1	(Egypt) El Mahdy Soliman
DF	3	(Egypt) Abdallah Bakry
DF	4	(Egypt) Omar Gaber
MF	12	(Egypt) Ahmed Tawfik
MF	22	(Uganda) Lumala Abdu		(substituted on) 63'
FW	17	(Egypt) Mohamed Farouk		(substituted on) 73'
FW	23	(Egypt) Ahmed Ali		(substituted on) 73'
Manager:
(France) Sébastien Desabre

GK	21	(Egypt) Mohamed Awad
LB	19	(Egypt) Mohamed Abdel Shafy
CB	4	(Egypt) Mahmoud Alaa	(yellow card) 7'
CB	5	(Egypt) Mohamed Abdel Ghani	(yellow card) 28'
RB	12	(Tunisia) Hamdi Nagguez
CM	3	(Egypt) Tarek Hamed
CM	13	(Tunisia) Ferjani Sassi
AM	11	(Egypt) Youssef Obama		(substituted off) 72'
LW	20	(Morocco) Achraf Bencharki
RW	10	(Egypt) Mahmoud Shikabala (c)		(substituted off) 62'
CF	15	(Egypt) Mostafa Mohamed		(substituted off) 85'
Substitutes:
GK	1	(Egypt) Mohamed Abou Gabal
DF	22	(Egypt) Abdallah Gomaa
DF	28	(Egypt) Mahmoud Hamdy		(substituted on) 85'
FW	9	(Egypt) Omar El Said
FW	26	(Egypt) Emam Ashour		(substituted on) 72'
FW	28	(Morocco) Mohamed Ounajem	(yellow card) 65'	(substituted on) 62'
FW	29	(Morocco) Khalid Boutaïb
Manager:
(Serbia) Milutin Sredojević

Man of the Match:
Mahmoud Shikabala (Zamalek)

Assistant referees:
Radu Ghinguleac (Romania)
Mircea Orbulet (Romania)
Fourth official:
Marcel Birsan (Romania)

Match rules

- 90 minutes
- 30 minutes of extra time if necessary
- Penalty shoot-out if scores still level
- Seven named substitutes
- Maximum of three substitutions
