= Ahmed Afifi =

Ahmed Afifi may refer to:

- Ahmed Afifi (volleyball) (born 1988), Egyptian volleyball player
- Ahmed Afifi (footballer) (born 1993), Egyptian footballer

== See also ==
- Ahmed Afif (born 1967), Seychellois politician and banker
