= Jhon Cifuente =

Ecuadorian footballer (born 1992)

Personal information
- Full name: Jhon Jairo Cifuente Vergara
- Date of birth: 23 July 1992 (age 34)
- Place of birth: Esmeraldas, Ecuador
- Height: 1.79 m (5 ft 10 in)
- Position: Striker

Team information
- Current team: Libertad

Youth career
- 2008–2009: Olmedo
- 2009–2011: Deportivo Quito

Senior career*
Years	Team	Apps	(Gls)
2011–2014	Juventud Minera	43	(42)
2015–2016	Macará	54	(25)
2016–2018	Universidad Católica	94	(60)
2019	Pyramids	14	(3)
2020–2022	Delfín	66	(29)
2022–2023	Barcelona SC	16	(7)
2023	→ Aucas (loan)	28	(11)
2024	Universidad Católica	19	(5)
2025–2026	El Nacional	16	(2)
2026–	Libertad	0	(0)

International career^{‡}
2017–2018	Ecuador	4	(2)
- * Club domestic league appearances and goals as of 10 March 2026 ‡ National team caps and goals as of 20 November 2018

Jhon Jairo Cifuente Vergara (born 23 July 1992) is an Ecuadorian professional footballer who last plays for Ecuadorian Serie A club Libertad as a forward.

== Club career ==
=== Early career ===
Cifuente was born in Esmeraldas, and represented Olmedo and Deportivo Quito as a youth. In 2011 he joined Segunda Categoría side CD Juventud Minera, where he appeared and scored regularly.

=== Macará ===
On 18 February 2015, Cifuente signed for Macará in Serie B. He scored his first goal as a professional on 22 March in a 3–3 home draw against Técnico Universitario, and finished the season with 11 goals in 34 appearances.

=== Universidad Católica ===
On 19 July 2016, Cifuente was transferred to Serie A side Universidad Católica, with his former side retaining half of his federative rights. He made his debut in the category on 6 August, coming on as a second-half substitute in a 1–0 home win over Emelec.

Cifuente scored his first goals in the main category of Ecuadorian football on 15 October 2016, netting four times in a 6–1 home routing of Mushuc Runa. The following 30 May, he scored a hat-trick in a 3–0 Copa Sudamericana home defeat of Petrolero.

Cifuente ended the 2018 campaign as the topscorer with 37 goals, eight ahead of Brayan Angulo.

=== Pyramids ===
On 20 December 2018, Cifuente moved abroad for the first time in his career after agreeing to a contract with Egyptian Premier League side Pyramids FC.

== International career ==
Cifuente made his full international debut for Ecuador on 8 June 2017, replacing Enner Valencia late into a 1–1 friendly draw against Venezuela at the FAU Stadium in Boca Raton, Florida. He scored his first international goal five days later, netting the opener in a 3–0 home success over El Salvador.

== Career statistics ==
=== Club ===
As of 10 May 2024

Appearances and goals by club, season and competition
Club	Season	League			Cup		Continental		Other		Total	
Club	Season	Division	Apps	Goals	Apps	Goals	Apps	Goals	Apps	Goals	Apps	Goals
Juventud Minera	2011	Segunda Categoría	16	10	—		—		—		16	10
Juventud Minera	2012	Segunda Categoría	5	2	—		—		5 (Note: Appearance(s) in Campeonato Provincial de Segunda Categoría de Bolívar)	7	10	9
Juventud Minera	2013	Segunda Categoría	5	2	—		—		3	8	8	10
Juventud Minera	2014	Segunda Categoría	17	28	—		—		6	20	23	48
Juventud Minera	Total		43	42	—		—		14	35	57	77
Macará	2015	Ecuadorian Serie B	34	11	—		—		—		34	11
Macará	2016	Ecuadorian Serie B	20	14	—		—		—		20	14
Macará	Total		54	25	—		—		—		54	25
Universidad Católica	2016	Ecuadorian Serie A	15	8	—		1 (Note: Appearance(s) in Copa Sudamericana)	0	—		16	8
Universidad Católica	2017	Ecuadorian Serie A	36	15	—		4	5	—		40	20
Universidad Católica	2018	Ecuadorian Serie A	43	37	—		—		—		43	37
Universidad Católica	Total		94	60	—		5	5	—		99	65
Pyramids	2018–19	Egyptian Premier League	14	3	—		—		—		14	3
Delfín	2020	Ecuadorian Serie A	26	8	0	0	6 (Note: Appearance(s) in Copa Libertadores de América)	0	—		32	8
Delfín	2021	Ecuadorian Serie A	28	17	1	0	—		—		29	17
Delfín	2022	Ecuadorian Serie A	12	4	—		2	0	—		14	4
Delfín	Total		66	29	1	0	8	0	—		77	29
Barcelona S.C.	2022	Ecuadorian Serie A	16	7	—		—		—		16	7
Aucas	2023	Ecuadorian Serie A	28	11	1	0	6	0	—		35	11
Universidad Católica	2024	Ecuadorian Serie A	10	2	—		5	2	—		15	4
Career total			228	137	2	0	24	7	14	35	212	168

=== International ===
As of 20 November 2018

Appearances and goals by national team and year
National team	Year	Apps	Goals
Ecuador	2017	2	1
Ecuador	2018	2	1
Total		4	2

Scores and results list Ecuador's goal tally first.

No.	Date	Venue	Opponent	Score	Result	Competition
1.	14 June 2017	Red Bull Arena, Harrison, United States	El Salvador	1–0	3–0	Friendly
2.	20 November 2018	Estadio Rommel Fernández, Panama City, Panama	Panama	1–0	2–1	Friendly

== Honours ==
Individual

- Ecuadorian Segunda Categoría top goalscorer: 2014 (28 goals)
- Copa Sudamericana top goalscorer: 2017 (5 goals)
