= Mohamed Rizk (footballer, born 1993) =

Egyptian professional footballer

Personal information
- Full name: Mohamed Rizk Lotfi
- Date of birth: June 1, 1993 (age 33)
- Position: Defensive midfielder

Team information
- Current team: ENPPI
- Number: 28

Youth career
- Al Ahly

Senior career*
Years	Team	Apps	(Gls)
–2014	Al Ahly		
2014–2015	El Gouna	19	(0)
2015–2017	Aswan	50	(3)
2017–2019	Alassiouty Sport	36	(4)
2019–	ENPPI	3	(0)
- * Club domestic league appearances and goals as of 21:08, 7 December 2019 (UTC)

Mohamed Rizk Lotfi (Arabic: مُحَمَّد رِزْق لُطْفِيّ; born June 1, 1993) is an Egyptian professional footballer who currently plays as a defensive midfielder for the Egyptian club Elgouna SC.

== Career ==
In August 2017, Rizk signed a 3-year contract for Al-Assiouty moving from Aswan.
