= Hesham Ramadan =

Egyptian professional footballer (born 1996)

Personal information
- Date of birth: January 1, 1996 (age 30)
- Place of birth: Faiyum, Egypt
- Position: Striker

Team information
- Current team: Alassiouty Sport
- Number: 17

Youth career
- Fayoum

Senior career*
Years	Team	Apps	(Gls)
–2016	Fayoum		
2016–	Alassiouty Sport		
- * Club domestic league appearances and goals as of 20 September 2017

Hesham Ramadan Neymar (Arabic: هشام رمضان; born January 1, 1996, in Faiyum) is an Egyptian professional footballer who plays as a striker for Alassiouty Sport. Alassiouty bought Ramadan from Fayoum SC in 2016 for 75,000 Egyptian pounds, he signed a 5-year contract.
