= Radu Petrescu (referee, born 1982) =

Romanian football referee

- Full name: Radu Petrescu
- Born: 12 November 1982 (age 43); Bucharest, SR Romania

Domestic
Years	League	Role
2007–	Liga I	Referee

International
Years	League	Role
2012–	FIFA listed	Referee

Radu Marian Petrescu (born 12 November 1982) is a Romanian football referee who officiates in the Liga I. He has been a FIFA referee since 2012, and is ranked as a UEFA first category referee.

== Refereeing career ==
In 2007, Petrescu began officiating in the Liga I. His first match as referee was on 10 August 2007 between Mioveni and Vaslui. He served as the referee for the 2015 Supercupa României, 2018 Supercupa României, 2017 Cupa Ligii Final, 2019 Cupa României Final and 2020 Supercupa Romaniei.

In 2012, he was put on the FIFA referees list. He officiated his first senior international match on 4 June 2016 between Slovakia and Northern Ireland. He officiated two matches in the Qatar Stars League during the 2015–16 season, as well as the 2019 Egypt Cup Final. In 2022, he made his debut in Uefa Champions League group stage (Viktoria Plzen - FC Barcelona). In 2024, he refereed Egyptian League Cup Final.
