= Sherif Medhat =

Egyptian footballer (born 1988)

Personal information
- Date of birth: January 20, 1988 (age 38)
- Position: Goalkeeper

Team information
- Current team: Alassiouty Sport
- Number: 1

Senior career*
| Years | Team | Apps | (Gls) |
| –2014 | Asyut Petroleum | | |
| 2014– | Alassiouty Sport | | |
- * Club domestic league appearances and goals as of 15 September 2017

Sherif Medhat (Arabic: شَرِيف مِدْحَت; born January 20, 1988) is an Egyptian professional footballer who plays as a goalkeeper for Aluminum Sport. In 2014, Medhat joined Alassiouty from Asyut Petrolum, and he signed a 3-year contract for the club in 2016.
