= Essam Tharwat =

Egyptian footballer (born 1989)

Personal information
- Date of birth: 11-8-1989
- Place of birth: Zagazig, yes
- Height: 1.87 m (6 ft 2 in)
- Position: Goalkeeper

Team information
- Current team: Al Masry
- Number: 1

Senior career*
Years	Team	Apps	(Gls)
2007–2009	Merkaz Shabab Abou Kabir		
2009–2017	Al Nasr	37	(0)
2017–2018	Alassiouty Sport	27	(0)
2018–2019	Smouha	10	(0)
2019–2020	FC Masr	29	(0)
2020–	Al Masry	70	(0)
- * Club domestic league appearances and goals

Essam Tharwat (Arabic: عِصَام ثَرْوَت; born aug 8, 1989) an Egyptian professional footballer who currently plays as a goalkeeper for Egyptian Premier League club Al Masry.

== Career ==
In 2017, he joined the promoted team to 2017–18 Egyptian Premier League Alassiouty Sport in a free transfer from Al-Nasr, he signed a 3-year contract.

He later played for Smouha and FC Masr, before joining Al Masry in November 2020.
