= Sherif Dabo =

Egyptian footballer (born 1994)

Personal information
- Full name: Sherif Adel Mohamed
- Date of birth: January 28, 1994 (age 32)
- Place of birth: Alexandria, Egypt
- Height: 1.85 m (6 ft 1 in)
- Position: Attacking midfielder

Team information
- Current team: Ceramica Cleopatra

Youth career
- ENPPI

Senior career*
Years	Team	Apps	(Gls)
2015–2016	FC Masr		
2016–2017	Tersana		
2017–2019	Pyramids	25	(5)
2019	→ El Gouna (loan)	4	(0)
2019	ENPPI		
2020–	Ceramica Cleopatra		

International career
2013	Egypt under-20	1	(0)
- * Club domestic league appearances and goals as of 22:19, 15 May 2019 (UTC)

Sherif Adel Dabo (Arabic: شريف عادل; born January 28, 1994) is an Egyptian professional footballer who plays as an attacking midfielder for Ceramica Cleopatra in the Egyptian Premier League.

Dabo also presented Egypt in u-20 national team, and was part of the Egyptian squad winning the 2013 African U-20 Championship, he appeared in the third group stage match on March 22 against Benin when they won 1–0.
