= Mohamed El Gabbas =

Egyptian footballer (born 1988)

Mohamed El-Gabbas
Personal information
- Full name: Mohamed El-Gabbas
- Date of birth: 1 January 1988 (age 38)
- Place of birth: Port Said, Egypt
- Height: 1.78 m (5 ft 10 in)
- Position: Forward

Youth career
- 2003–2005: Al-Masry
- 2005–2007: Newcastle United
- 2007–2008: Al-Masry

Senior career*
Years	Team	Apps	(Gls)
2008–2009	Al-Masry	45	(10)
2009–2013	Lierse	98	(19)
2013–2014	Swindon Town	10	(0)
2014	Arles	11	(1)
2014–2016	Wadi Degla	29	(11)
2016–2018	Lierse	26	(4)
2018–2019	Wadi Degla	19	(1)
2019–	Pyramids	73	(10)

International career^{‡}
2009–2015	Egypt	8	(1)
- * Club domestic league appearances and goals as of 02:32, 17 July 2026 (UTC) ‡ National team caps and goals as of 02:32, 17 July 2026 (UTC)

Mohamed El-Gabbas (Arabic: محمد الجباس; born 1 January 1988, in Port Said), known as Dodo El Gabbas, is an Egyptian footballer who plays as a forward.

== Club career ==
Mohamed El-Gabbas was playing for the youth ranks at Al-Masry at the age of 14. He was then noticed by a youth scout from Newcastle and he played alongside former West Ham striker Andy Carroll in the youth ranks at Newcastle. After playing for a year for Newcastle's youth team, El-Gabbas unfortunately could not obtain a work permit and therefore was not able to sign a professional contract with Newcastle. As a result, El-Gabbas returned to his former Egyptian club Al-Masry.

After two seasons with Al-Masry, El-Gabbas shone like a star scoring many goals in Egyptian league and cup competitions, leading to both Egyptian giants Al-Ahly and Zamalek looking to obtain his signature. However, he decided to sign for Belgian Second Division side Lierse S.K. in 2009. There he played comfortably alongside his Egyptian teammates Ahmed Samir, Sherif El Baily and Mohamed Abdel Wahed. He consistently played in a successful Lierse season as they were promoted to the Belgian Pro League in 2010. As the years passed, El-Gabbas was always one of the first choice strikers along with Wesley Sonck and Soufiane Bidaoui. His impressive goal-scoring ability drew the attention of Egypt national team coaches Hassan Shehata and Bob Bradley and also some other clubs from bigger leagues in Europe. In an interview with El-Gabbas on Melody Sport, El-Gabbas stated that he is enjoying himself at Lierse and wouldn't mind staying and helping the team but he "would like to move to a bigger league in Europe in the near future." El-Gabbas later stated that he has offers from French and Dutch teams and he would like to move "at the end of the 2012 season or in the 2013 season."

El Gabbas left Lierse at the end of 2012–13 Belgian Pro League. He signed with League One side Swindon Town. He left the latter for limited playing time and signed with Ligue 2 team Arles for six months.

He returned to Egypt in September 2014 after his short stints with French team Arles the past season. He signed with Cairo-based club Wadi Degla, before returning to Lierse for a second spell. In 2018, he returned to Wadi Degla, before joining Pyramids in 2019.

== International career ==
He was named to the Egypt squad for a 2010 FIFA World Cup qualifying match against Rwanda and Zambia. El-Gabbas was called to the national team more with current Egypt team coach Bob Bradley then before-coach Hassan Shehata. He has taken part in numerous friendlies and in World Cup and African Cup qualifiers. He scored his only goal with his national team in a 2–1 victory over Malawi in a friendly match. His last appearance was in a 3–0 win against Tanzania during the 2017 Africa Cup of Nations qualification Group G. He did not appear for the national team after then.

== Career statistics ==
=== International ===
Appearances and goals by national team and year
National team	Year	Apps	Goals
Egypt	2009	2	0
Egypt	2010	–	
Egypt	2011	1	0
Egypt	2012	3	0
Egypt	2013	–	
Egypt	2014	–	
Egypt	2015	2	1
Total		8	1

Scores and results list Egypt's goal tally first, score column indicates score after each El Gabbas goal.

List of international goals scored by Mohamed El Gabbas
No.	Date	Venue	Opponent	Score	Result	Competition
1	8 June 2015	Borg El Arab Stadium, Alexandria, Egypt	Malawi	2–0	2–1	Friendly

== Honours ==
Pyramids

- Egypt Cup: 2023–24
- CAF Champions League: 2024–25
- FIFA African–Asian–Pacific Cup: 2025
