= Mahmoud Salah (footballer, born 1994) =

Egyptian footballer (born 1994)

Personal information
- Full name: Mahmoud Salah Abdel-Naser
- Date of birth: October 10, 1994 (age 32)
- Position: Left midfielder

Team information
- Current team: Aswan SC
- Number: 13

Youth career
- El Mokawloon

Senior career*
Years	Team	Apps	(Gls)
2013–2019	Pyramids		
2018–2019	→ Petrojet (loan)	26	(3)
2019–2020	ENPPI	3	(0)
2020-	Aswan SC	12	(0)
- * Club domestic league appearances and goals as of 24 September 2017

Mahmoud Salah Abdel-Naser (Arabic: مَحْمُود صَلَاح عَبْد النَّاصِر; born October 10, 1994) is an Egyptian professional footballer who plays as a left midfielder for the Egyptian club ENPPI SC

== Career ==
In July 2017, Salah renewed his contract with Al-Assiouty for 3 years after their promotion to 2017–18 Egyptian Premier League.
