= Azubuike Okechukwu =

Nigerian footballer (born 1997)

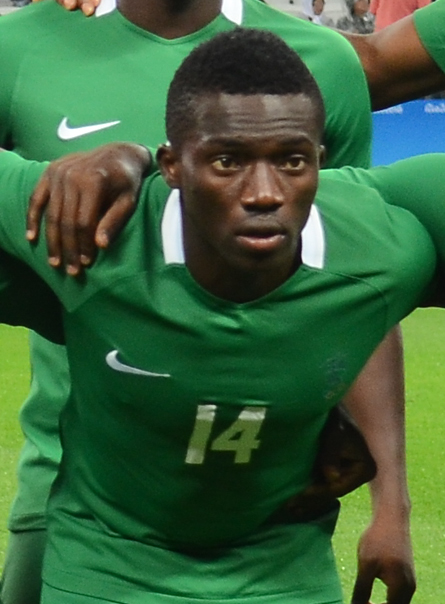
- Okechukwu at the 2016 Olympics.

Personal information
- Full name: Azubuike Godson Okechukwu
- Date of birth: 19 April 1997 (age 29)
- Place of birth: Katsina, Nigeria
- Height: 1.70 m (5 ft 7 in)
- Position: Defensive midfielder

Senior career*
Years	Team	Apps	(Gls)
2013–2015	Bayelsa United		
2015–2018	Yeni Malatyaspor	83	(0)
2018–2020	Pyramids FC	6	(0)
2019	→ Çaykur Rizespor (loan)	14	(1)
2019–2020	→ İstanbul Başakşehir (loan)	17	(0)
2020–2023	İstanbul Başakşehir	12	(0)
2021	→ Sivasspor (loan)	10	(0)
2022	→ Yeni Malatyaspor (loan)	15	(0)
2023–2024	Çaykur Rizespor	13	(0)
2024–2025	Erzurumspor	29	(0)

International career
- Nigeria U23
2016	Nigeria	1	(0)
- * Club domestic league appearances and goals as of 15 June 2025

Azubuike Godson Okechukwu (born 19 April 1997) is a Nigerian professional footballer who plays as a defensive midfielder.

== Club career ==
Born in Katsina, Okechukwu has played club football for Bayelsa United and Yeni Malatyaspor.

On 19 August 2018, Okechukwu joined Egyptian Premier League side Pyramids FC.

In January 2019, he joined Çaykur Rizespor on loan until the end of the season. On 10 July 2019, İstanbul Başakşehir confirmed, that they had signed Okechukwu on a season-long loan deal. He won the Turkish championship with the club.

In August 2020, Okechukwu signed a permanent contract with İstanbul Başakşehir. In July 2021 he moved on loan to Sivasspor. He moved on loan to Yeni Malatyaspor in January 2022.

After returning to Çaykur Rizespor on a permanent basis, he signed for Erzurumspor in August 2024.

== International career ==
Okechukwu made his international debut for the Nigeria national team in 2016, and he was selected by Nigeria for their 35-man provisional squad for the 2016 Summer Olympics.
