= Ahmed Afifi (footballer) =

Egyptian footballer (born 1993)

Personal information
- Date of birth: May 24, 1993 (age 33)
- Height: 1.66 m (5 ft 5 in)
- Position: Winger

Senior career*
Years	Team	Apps	(Gls)
–2017	El Gouna		
2016–2017	→ Aswan (loan)	14	(0)
2017–2019	Pyramids FC	24	(2)
2019–2020	Petrojet SC	27	(4)
2020–2021	El Entag El Harby	28	(1)
2021–2022	Ghazl El Mahalla	8	(0)
2022–2023	Al Mokawloon	11	(0)
2024	Makadi		
2024–2025	Baish		
- * Club domestic league appearances and goals as of 22:56, 29 April 2019 (UTC)

Ahmed Afifi (Arabic: أَحْمَد عَفِيفِيّ; born May 24, 1993) is an Egyptian professional footballer who plays as a winger. In 2016, El Gouna refused to sell him and accepted a loan to Aswan for one season. Afifi joined Pyramids FC (then known as Al-Assiouty Sport) in 2017 in a free transfer from El Gouna and signed a 2-year contract.
