= Mohamed Farouk (footballer, born 1989) =

Egyptian footballer

Personal information
- Full name: Mohamed Farouk Salama
- Date of birth: 14 September 1989 (age 37)
- Place of birth: Cairo, Egypt
- Height: 1.77 m (5 ft 10 in)
- Position: Forward

Team information
- Current team: Pyramids
- Number: 17

Youth career
- –2011: Telecom Egypt

Senior career*
Years	Team	Apps	(Gls)
2011–2014	Al Mokawloon Al Arab	44	(10)
2014–2015	Al-Ahly	5	(0)
→ 2015	Wadi Degla (loan)	15	(0)
2015–2016	Wadi Degla	4	(0)
→ 2016	El Entag El Harby (loan)	17	(4)
2016–2018	Al Mokawloon Al Arab	57	(13)
2018–	Pyramids	50	(11)

International career
2014–	Egypt	3	(0)
- * Club domestic league appearances and goals

Mohamed Farouk (Arabic: محمد فاروق; born 14 September 1989 in Cairo) is an Egyptian footballer who plays for Pyramids in the Egyptian Premier League. He made his international debut with Egypt under Shawky Gharib on 5 March 2014 in a match against Bosnia and Herzegovina. He wore the jersey number 22 in Al-Ahly after the retirement of Mohamed Aboutrika.
