= Mohamed Fathy =

Egyptian footballer (born 1994)

Personal information
- Full name: Mohamed Fathy Mahmoud
- Date of birth: 2 February 1994 (age 32)
- Place of birth: Egypt
- Position: Defensive midfielder

Team information
- Current team: National Bank of Egypt SC
- Number: 5

Youth career
- Ismaily SC

Senior career*
Years	Team	Apps	(Gls)
2015–2018	Ismaily SC	99	(4)
2018–2021	Pyramids FC	24	(5)
2021	→ National Bank of Egypt SC (loan)	15	(0)
2021–	National Bank of Egypt SC		
- * Club domestic league appearances and goals

Mohamed Fathy (Arabic: محمد فتحي; born 2 February 1994) is an Egyptian football player who plays as a defensive midfielder for Egyptian Premier League club National Bank of Egypt SC. He was called to the Egypt national football team by Héctor Cúper for the match against Uganda for the 2018 FIFA World Cup qualification.
