= Abdu Lumala =

Ugandan footballer (born 1997)

Personal information
- Date of birth: 21 July 1997 (age 29)
- Place of birth: Uganda
- Height: 1.70 m (5 ft 7 in)
- Position: Forward

Team information
- Current team: Gokulam Kerala

Youth career
- –2014: Gualövs GoIF
- 2014–2015: Mjällby AIF

Senior career*
Years	Team	Apps	(Gls)
2015	Mjällby AIF	24	(3)
2016–2019	Kalmar FF	10	(0)
2017	→ Varbergs BoIS	10	(1)
2017	→ Helsingborgs IF (loan)	10	(1)
2018	→ IFK Värnamo (loan)	22	(0)
2019	→ Syrianska FC (loan)	9	(1)
2019–2022	Pyramids	4	(0)
2022–2024	Vipers SC	16	(2)
2024	Slaven Belupo	4	(0)
2024–	Gokulam Kerala	0	(0)

International career^{‡}
2019–	Uganda	11	(1)
- * Club domestic league appearances and goals ‡ National team caps and goals as of 20 July 2026

Abdu Lumala (born 21 July 1997) is a Ugandan professional footballer who plays as a forward for I-League club Gokulam Kerala and the Uganda national team.

== Club career ==
=== Early years ===
Abdu grew up with his grandmother in the village of Kataba since his mother had died when he was just a few months old and since the father was unknown. When he was 10 he was given a Henrik Larsson-shirt as a birthday present by his aunt. In hope of receiving a better life his grandmother sent him away to the capital Kampala when he was 16. Abdu took many jobs, mostly washing cars before he met a few white Europeans who managed to get him on a plane to Sturup Airport.

=== Sweden ===
He was left alone on the streets of Malmö and there he contacted Migrationsverket. They managed to get accommodation for Abdu in the little town of Bromölla. There he started training with the local club Ifö/Bromölla playing in the Swedish 5th tier, but after not managing to find any football shoes he and a friend moved to 9th tier side Gualövs GoIF. He was instantly made captain and after scoring 20 goals in 10 games big local club Mjällby AIF signed him in the summer of 2014. He played the rest of the year with the U17s and U19s. Before the next season Abdu was moved up to the A-Team playing in Swedish second division Superettan. He impressed, scoring 3 goals in 24 games being only 17 when the season started. The rumours of his talent spread and clubs like Malmö FF and Olympiacos wanting to sign him.

=== Kalmar FF ===
Abdu instead ended up in Swedish top flight club Kalmar FF. In his first season, he played 10 league matches.

==== Loans ====
Ahead of the 2017 season Abdu was loaned out to Superettan club Varbergs BoIS. After half a season with the club, he returned to Kalmar FF just to be loaned out once again, this time to his idol Henrik Larsson's mother club Helsingborgs IF. He made his debut in a game against GAIS. At the back of Abdu's shirt it says "Lumalinho".

=== Pyramids FC ===
In July 2019, Abdu joined Egyptian Premier League club Pyramids FC where he linked up with former Uganda coach Sébastien Desabre.

=== Slaven Belupo ===
On 27 March 2024, Abdu returned to Europe and signed a contract with the Croatian club Slaven Belupo.

=== Gokulam Kerala ===
In July 2024, Abdu joined Indian I-League club Gokulam Kerala.

== International career ==
He made his Uganda national team debut as a starter on 9 June 2019, in a 0–0 friendly tie versus Turkmenistan.

== Career statistics ==
=== Club ===
As of 16 July 2019

Appearances and goals by club, season and competition
Club	Season	League			Cups		Continental		Other		Total	
Club	Season	Division	Apps	Goals	Apps	Goals	Apps	Goals	Apps	Goals	Apps	Goals
Gualövs GoIF	2014	Division 7 Blekinge	10	20	–		–		–		10	20
Mjällby AIF	2015	Superettan	24	3	3	1	–		2	0	29	4
Kalmar FF	2016	Allsvenskan	10	0	5	2	–		–		15	2
Varbergs BoIS (loan)	2017	Superettan	10	1	–		–		–		10	1
Helsingborgs IF (loan)	2017	Superettan	10	1	–		–		–		10	1
IFK Värnamo (loan)	2017	Superettan	22	0	2	0	–		2	0	26	0
Syrianska FC (loan)	2019	Superettan	9	1	–		–		–		9	1
Career total			95	26	10	3	0	0	4	0	109	29

=== International ===
As of matches played on 29 August 2021

Appearances and goals by national team and year
National team	Year	Apps	Goals
Uganda	2019	8	0
Uganda	2020	–	
Uganda	2021	3	1
Total		11	1

Scores and results list Uganda's goal tally first, score column indicates score after each Lumala goal.

List of international goals scored by Passang Tshering
No.	Date	Venue	Opponent	Score	Result	Competition
1	10 June 2021	Orlando Stadium, Johannesburg, South Africa	South Africa	2–3	2–3	Friendly
