= John Antwi =

Ghanaian footballer (born 1992)

Personal information
- Full name: John Antwi Duku
- Date of birth: 6 August 1992 (age 34)
- Place of birth: Sekondi, Ghana
- Height: 1.80 m (5 ft 11 in)
- Position: Striker

Team information
- Current team: Dreams F.C.

Youth career
- 2008–2010: Dreams F.C.

Senior career*
Years	Team	Apps	(Gls)
2011–2012	Sekondi Eleven Wise	0	(0)
2013–2015	Ismaily	52	(31)
2015	Al Shabab	16	(4)
2015–2018	Al Ahly SC	29	(10)
2017–2018	→ Misr El-Makasa (loan)	33	(22)
2018–2019	Misr El-Makasa	28	(11)
2019–2021	Pyramids	47	(9)
2021–2022	Tala'ea El Gaish SC	7	(1)
2023	Al-Faisaly SC		
2023–	Dreams F.C.		

International career^{‡}
2017–	Ghana	2	(0)
- * Club domestic league appearances and goals as of 11 February 2024 ‡ National team caps and goals as of 17 November 2020

John Antwi Duku (born 6 August 1992) is a Ghanaian professional footballer who plays for Dreams F.C. as a striker. At the international level, he has featured twice for Ghana national team.

== Club career ==
=== Dreams F.C. ===
The footballing career of John Antwi began with Dreams F.C., a Ghanaian club in the Ghana Division Two league at the time. While playing for Dreams F.C. he was invited to the 2010–2011 preseason training programme of Accra Hearts of Oak. The invitation was proved fruitful as his form showed by scoring five goals in seven friendly matches.

=== Sekondi Eleven Wise ===
Antwi began his professional football career with Sekondi Eleven Wise in Sekondi in 2011. His performances for Eleven Wise earned him trials with Egyptian sides Al Ahly and Beni Suef Telephones. He played for the Ghanaian club for a year before being sold to Egyptian club Ismaily in 2012.

=== Ismaily SC ===
Antwi joined Egyptian Premier League side Ismaily in December 2012 on a five-year deal. He was purchased for two hundred and fifty thousand US$. Antwi settled quickly to life in the Egyptian league. In his first season with Ismaily SC he scored a total of nine goals in as many official games he played with them.

Prior to the cancellation of the Egyptian Premier League due to the June 2013 political crisis, John scored two goals in CAF Confederation Cup matches, two goals in the Egypt Cup and five goals in the Egyptian Premier League. As at the end of the day two of the 2013–2014 Egyptian Premier League, Antwi was the leading top scorer with four goals. By the time his second season with Egyptian league side Ismaily ended, he had scored 11 goals in 16 matches to win the top scorer of the league.

=== Al Shabab FC ===
On 26 January 2015, Antwi joined the Saudi Arabian side Al Shabab after Ismaily agreed to a deal for $2,200,000 in a two-and-a-half-year contract. On 6 February, Antwi made his club debut as a replacement for Abdulmajeed Al Sulaiheem in the 52nd minute against Al-Khaleej FC, but he failed to score as the match ended in 1–0 away defeat. On 12 February, Antwi was chosen for the starting XI for the match against Al Fateh, he scored his first goal for the club in the 61st minute as the match ended 2–2.

=== Al Ahly ===
On 15 June 2015, Antwi signed a four-year deal with Al Ahly. The match of his career with Al-Ahly was against El-Gouna in round of 16 of the Egyptian cup. He scored a "Super Hatrick" as the match ended with a record of 13/0 for Al-Ahly. On 22 September in the final game of the Egyptian cup against Zamalek, he failed to score any goal. The match ended 2/0 for Zamalek. He was awarded the "Golden Shoe" trophy by scoring 4 goals in the Egyptian cup.

=== Misr El-Makasa ===
In January 2017, Antwi was signed by Misr El-Makasa on a 6-month loan deal for a reported US$100,000 fee until the end of the season. He went on and scored 10 league goals within that period helping them to second place in the 2016–17. He ended the season as the third joint top goal scorer with 11 goals including scoring one goal for Al Ahly during the first round of the season before joining Misr El-Makasa.

Due to his performances in the previous season, his loan deal was extended by a year for the 2017–18 season. During that season, he made 22 goal contributions including scoring 16 goals and making 6 assists, ending his season as the second top goal scorer trailing Ahly forward Walid Azaro by 2 goals.

His impressive scoring run, triggered the team to put in a bid to sign him outrightly by activating his buyout clause of US$600,000. In June 2018, he was signed ahead of the 2018–19 season. Antwi made 28 league appearances and scored 11 goals at the end of the season. That season, he made history as he surpassed Ernest Papa Arko who scored 61 goals as the highest foreign scorer in the Egyptian Premier league with 63 goals after scoring a hat-trick during a match against ENPPI. Throughout his 2 1/2 seasons, he scored 40 goals, made 10 assists in 76 appearances in all competitions.

=== Pyramids ===
In April 2019, Misr El-Makasa reportedly rejected a Zamalek swap deal for Kasongo Kabongo. A month later on 30 July 2019, Antwi was acquired by Cairo side Pyramids on a 5-year deal for a US$1.5 million. He was set to earn $600,000 per season. On 6 September 2020, after scoring his side's lone goal in their away defeat 2–1 to El-Gouna SC set a milestone in Egyptian football by becoming the first foreign player to score a 100th goal with Egyptian clubs in all competitions. He helped the club to their first CAF Confederation Cup in 2019–20 CAF Confederation Cup which they lost to Moroccan side RS Berkane.

== International career ==
=== Youth career ===
Antwi was named as a member of the provisional team for the 2013 FIFA U-20 World Cup in Turkey.

=== Senior career ===
The goal scoring exploits of John Antwi are closely monitored in his home country of Ghana. In mid-2013 there were several calls for the player to be included in the Ghana national team, the Black Stars, for the 2014 FIFA World Cup qualification matches. Though the player was omitted from the national team, his form has continued to encourage the handlers of the national team who continue to watch his progress. He was called up to the senior Ghana squad for a World Cup qualifier against Uganda in October 2017. On 10 October 2017, he made his debut after coming on at half-time for Raphael Dwamena in a 3–0 victory over Saudi Arabia. After two years, he received call ups to the national team for 2021 Africa Cup of Nations qualifiers against Sudan November 2020. He came on in the 67th minute with Ghana eventually losing to Sudan through a goal in the 90th minute. He received a call up to the team for the subsequent matches last matches against South Africa and São Tomé and Príncipe but didn't feature in any of them.

== Career statistics ==
=== International ===
Appearances and goals by national team and year
National team	Year	Apps	Goals
Ghana	2017	1	0
Ghana	2020	1	0
Total		2	0

== Honours ==
Al Ahly

- Egyptian Premier League: 2015–16, 2016–17
- Egyptian FA Cup runner up: 2015, 2016

Pyramids

- CAF Confederation Cup runner-up: 2019–20
- Egyptian FA Cup runner up: 2018–19

Individual

- Egyptian Premier League top scorer: 2013–14
- Egyptian FA Cup top scorer: 2015, 2018–19

Records

- All-time highest foreign scorer in the Egyptian Premier league: 78 goals
- All-time highest foreign scorer in all competitions with Egyptian clubs: 102 goals

=== Nomination ===
In October 2024, he was nominated for the Men's Interclub Player of the Year category at the 2024 CAF Awards.
