= Eric Traoré =

Burkinabé footballer

Personal information
- Date of birth: 21 May 1996 (age 30)
- Place of birth: Ouagadougou, Burkina Faso
- Height: 1.82 m (6 ft 0 in)
- Position: Winger

Team information
- Current team: Real Kashmir
- Number: 79

Youth career
- US Ouagadougou

Senior career*
Years	Team	Apps	(Gls)
2012–2016	US Ouagadougou		
2016	Aswan	17	(4)
2016–2019	Misr Lel Makkasa	73	(14)
2019–2023	Pyramids	86	(16)
2022–2023	→ ENPPI (loan)	12	(0)
2024–2026	Ismaily	20	(2)
2026–	Real Kashmir		

International career^{‡}
2014–	Burkina Faso	15	(1)
- * Club domestic league appearances and goals as of 00:46, 9 November 2024 (UTC) ‡ National team caps and goals as of 03:03, 16 October 2024 (UTC)

Eric Traoré (born 21 May 1996) is a Burkinabé professional footballer who plays as a winger for the Indian Football League club Real Kashmir and the Burkina Faso national team.

== International career ==
In January 2014, coach Brama Traoré, invited him to be a part of the Burkina Faso squad for the 2014 African Nations Championship. The team was eliminated in the group stages after losing to Uganda and Zimbabwe and then drawing with Morocco.

== Career statistics ==
=== International ===
As of 16 October 2024

Appearances and goals by national team and year
National team	Year	Apps	Goals
Burkina Faso	2014	2	0
Burkina Faso	2015	1	0
Burkina Faso	2019	3	0
Burkina Faso	2020	3	1
Burkina Faso	2021	5	0
Burkina Faso	2022	1	0
Total		15	1

Scores and results list Burkina Faso's goal tally first, score column indicates score after each Traoré goal.

List of international goals scored by Eric Traoré
No.	Date	Venue	Opponent	Score	Result	Competition
1	12 October 2020	Ben M'Hamed El Abdi Stadium, El Jadida, Morocco	Madagascar	2–1	2–1	Friendly
