= Ibrahim Hassan (footballer, born 1991) =

Egyptian footballer (born 1991)

Personal information
- Date of birth: 25 July 1991 (age 35)
- Place of birth: Cairo, Egypt
- Height: 1.77 m (5 ft 10 in)
- Position: Winger

Team information
- Current team: Pyramids
- Number: 10

Youth career
- 2010–2013: Nogoom El Mostakbal

Senior career*
Years	Team	Apps	(Gls)
2013–2018	Ismaily SC	50	(5)
2018–2019	Zamalek SC	27	(2)
2019–	Pyramids	4	(1)
- * Club domestic league appearances and goals as of 20 November 2019

Ibrahim Hassan (Arabic: إبراهيم حسن; born 25 July 1991) is an Egyptian professional footballer who plays as a winger for Zamalek SC in the Egyptian Premier League.

== Honours ==
Zamalek SC

- Saudi-Egyptian Super Cup: 2018
- CAF Confederation Cup : 2018–19
- Egypt Cup: 2018–19
