= Ahmed Ayman Mansour =

Egyptian footballer (born 1994)

Ahmed Ayman
Personal information
- Full name: Ahmed Ayman Mohamed Mansour
- Date of birth: 13 April 1994 (age 32)
- Place of birth: Cairo, Egypt
- Height: 1.83 m (6 ft 0 in)
- Position: Defender

Youth career
- MS Al Zohour
- Zamalek

Senior career*
| Years | Team | Apps | (Gls) |
| 2013–2014 | Tala'ea El Gaish | 0 | (0) |
| 2014–2015 | El Dakhleya | 18 | (0) |
| 2015–2018 | Al Masry | 59 | (3) |
| 2018–2022 | Pyramids | 68 | (2) |
| 2022–2023 | Tala'ea El Gaish | 26 | (2) |
| 2023-2026 | Al Masry | 16 | (0) |
| 2025 | Modern Sport FC (loan) | 7 | (0) |

International career^{‡}
| 2008–2009 | Egypt U-20 | | |
| 2013 | Egypt U-23 | | |
| 2019– | Egypt | 5 | (0) |
- * Club domestic league appearances and goals as of 11:45, 30 July 2026 (UTC) ‡ National team caps and goals as of 19:58, 25 March 2021 (UTC)

Ahmed Ayman Mohamed Mansour (Arabic: أحمد أيمن محمد منصور; born 13 April 1994), is an Egyptian footballer who plays as a defender.

== Club career ==
In February 2025, he joined Modern Sport on a six-month loan.

== International career ==
He made his debut for the Egypt national football team on 23 March 2019 in an Africa Cup qualifier against Niger, as a starter.

== Personal life ==
Ahmed is the son of former Egypt and Zamalek forward Ayman Mansour.
