= El Mahdy Soliman =

Egyptian footballer (born 1987)

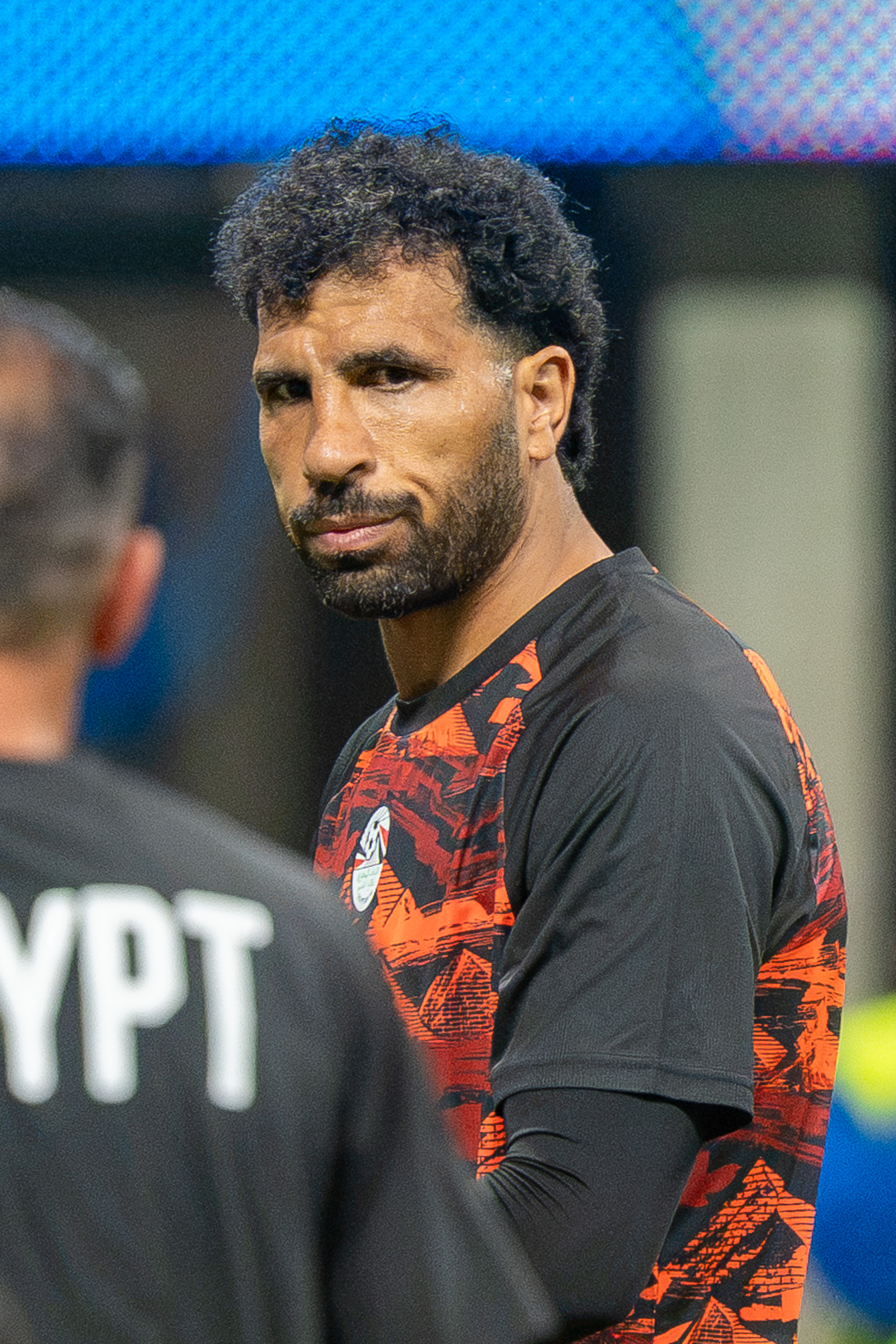
- Soliman with Egypt in 2026

Personal information
- Full name: El Mahdy Mohamed Soliman Ibrahim
- Date of birth: 8 June 1987 (age 39)
- Place of birth: Cairo, Egypt
- Height: 1.89 m (6 ft 2 in)
- Position: Goalkeeper

Team information
- Current team: Zamalek SC
- Number: 37

Youth career
- ENPPI

Senior career*
Years	Team	Apps	(Gls)
2007–2018	ENPPI	22	(0)
2011	→ Al Mokawloon Al Arab (loan)	3	(0)
2011–2012	→ Petrojet (loan)	10	(0)
2012–2013	Petrojet	15	(0)
2013–2014	Ghazl El Mahalla	18	(0)
2014–2018	Smouha	67	(0)
2018–2022	Pyramids	48	(0)
2022–2025	Al Ittihad Alexandria Club	69	(0)
2025–	Zamalek SC	12	(0)

International career^{‡}
2026–	Egypt	1	(0)
- * Club domestic league appearances and goals as of 11 October 2026 ‡ National team caps and goals as of 4 October 2026

El Mahdy Mohamed Soliman Ibrahim (Note: Arabic: المهدي محمد سليمان إبراهيم) (born 8 June 1987) is an Egyptian professional footballer who plays as a goalkeeper for the Egyptian Premier League side Zamalek SC and the Egypt national team.

== International Career ==
On 20 May 2026, he was named in the 26-man squad for the 2026 FIFA World Cup.

== Honours ==
Zamalek

- Egyptian Premier League: 2025–26
