= Islam Issa (footballer) =

Egyptian footballer (born 1996)

Personal information
- Full name: Islam Issa El Sayed Mohamed Attia
- Date of birth: 1 February 1996 (age 30)
- Place of birth: El Sharkia, Egypt
- Height: 1.66 m (5 ft 5 in)
- Position: Right winger

Team information
- Current team: Ceramica Cleopatra
- Number: 7

Youth career
- –2015: Al Nasr

Senior career*
Years	Team	Apps	(Gls)
2015–2016	Al Nasr		
2016–2017	Al Obour		
2017–2018	Al Nasr	16	(3)
2018–2019	Al Masry	26	(7)
2019–2024	Pyramids	70	(12)
2024–	Ceramica Cleopatra	40	(9)

International career^{‡}
2022–	Egypt	5	(1)
- * Club domestic league appearances and goals as of 18:56, 03 February 2026 (UTC) ‡ National team caps and goals as of 30 March 2026

Islam Issa El Sayed Mohamed Attia (Arabic: إسلام عيسى السيد محمد عطية; born 1 February 1996), is an Egyptian footballer who plays for Egyptian Premier League club Ceramica Cleopatra as a right winger and the Egypt national team.

Islam started his career with Al Nasr in youth level, but struggled to find a place in the first team after getting promoted. He joined Egyptian Third Division side Al Obour in 2016 on a free transfer, and returned to Al Nasr in the following year after showing great potential with the third division side. He plays for Pyramids in the Egyptian Premier League after agreeing on a transfer fee of £E10m (~$565k).
