= Nabil Emad =

Egyptian footballer (born 1996)

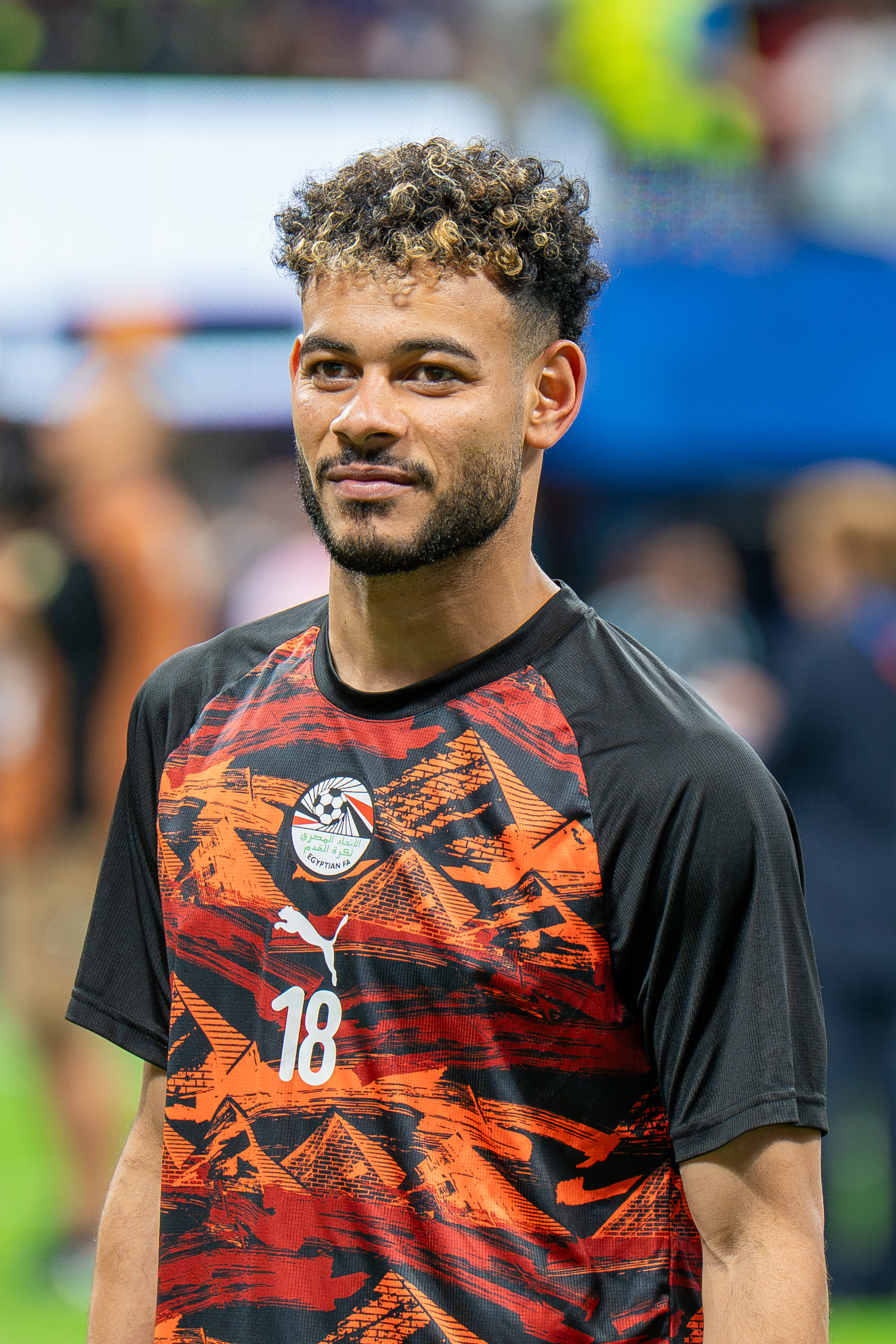
- Donga with Egypt in 2026

Personal information
- Full name: Nabil Emad Aly Elmahdy
- Date of birth: 6 April 1996 (age 30)
- Place of birth: El Mahalla El Kubra, Egypt
- Height: 1.79 m (5 ft 10 in)
- Position: Defensive midfielder

Team information
- Current team: Al-Najma
- Number: 88

Youth career
- Baladiyat El Mahalla
- Grand Hotel
- El Gouna
- MS Aga
- Beni Ebeid

Senior career*
Years	Team	Apps	(Gls)
2016–2022	Pyramids	173	(5)
2022–2026	Zamalek	74	(3)
2026–	Al-Najma	14	(0)

International career
2019–	Egypt	8	(0)
- * Club domestic league appearances and goals

Nabil Emad Aly Elmahdy (Note: Arabic: نبيل عماد علي المهدي) (born 6 April 1996) also known as Donga, (Note: Arabic: دونجا) is an Egyptian professional footballer who plays as a defensive midfielder for Saudi Pro League club Al-Najma and the Egypt national team.

== Club career ==
Emad started his career at Baladiyat El Mahalla, then played for Grand Hotel, El Gouna, MS Aga and Beni Ebeid. In 2016, Emad was transferred from Beni Ebeid, a team in the Egyptian Third Division, to Pyramids FC (then known as Al-Assiouty Sport) for 40,000 Egyptian pounds. He signed a 5-year contract. On 3 February 2026, Nabil Emad joined Saudi Pro League club Al-Najma.

== International career ==
He made his debut for the Egypt national football team on 23 March 2019 in an Africa Cup qualifier against Niger, as a starter.

On 20 May 2026, he was named in the 26-man squad for the 2026 FIFA World Cup.

== Personal life ==
On 29 May 2026, just hours before Egypt's head coach Hossam Hassan announced the final World Cup roster featuring Nabil Emad 'Donga', an Italian woman stated via Instagram that she was taking legal action against the player for an alleged physical assault. The incident in question reportedly occurred in July 2025. There has also been an allegation of sexual assault against Nabil Emad, which reportedly happened in May 2025 in Egypt.

== Honours ==
Zamalek

- Egypt Cup: 2024–25
- CAF Confederation Cup: 2023–24
- CAF Super Cup: 2024
