= 2019 CAF Confederation Cup final =

- Event: 2018–19 CAF Confederation Cup
RS Berkane	Zamalek
(Morocco)	(Egypt)
1	1
- on aggregate Zamalek won 5–3 on penalties

First leg
RS Berkane	Zamalek
1	0
- Date: 19 May 2019
- Venue: Stade Municipal de Berkane, Berkane
- Referee: Janny Sikazwe (Zambia)
- Attendance: 13,000

Second leg
Zamalek	RS Berkane
1	0
- Date: 26 May 2019
- Venue: Borg El Arab Stadium, Alexandria
- Referee: Bamlak Tessema Weyesa (Ethiopia)
- Attendance: 70,000

The 2019 CAF Confederation Cup final was the final of the 2018–19 CAF Confederation Cup, the 28th edition of Africa's secondary club football tournament organized by the Confederation of African Football (CAF), and the 16th edition under the current CAF Confederation Cup title.

The final was contested in two-legged home-and-away format between RS Berkane from Morocco and Zamalek from Egypt. The first leg was hosted by RS Berkane at the Stade Municipal de Berkane in Berkane on 19 May 2019, while the second leg was hosted by Zamalek at the Borg El Arab Stadium in Alexandria on 26 May 2019.

The final finished 1–1 on aggregate, with Zamalek winning 5–3 on penalties for their first CAF Confederation Cup title. The winner will earn the right to play in the 2020 CAF Super Cup.

== Teams ==
Team	Zone	Previous finals appearances (bold indicates winners)
(Morocco) RS Berkane	UNAF (North Africa)	None
(Egypt) Zamalek	UNAF (North Africa)	None

== Venues ==
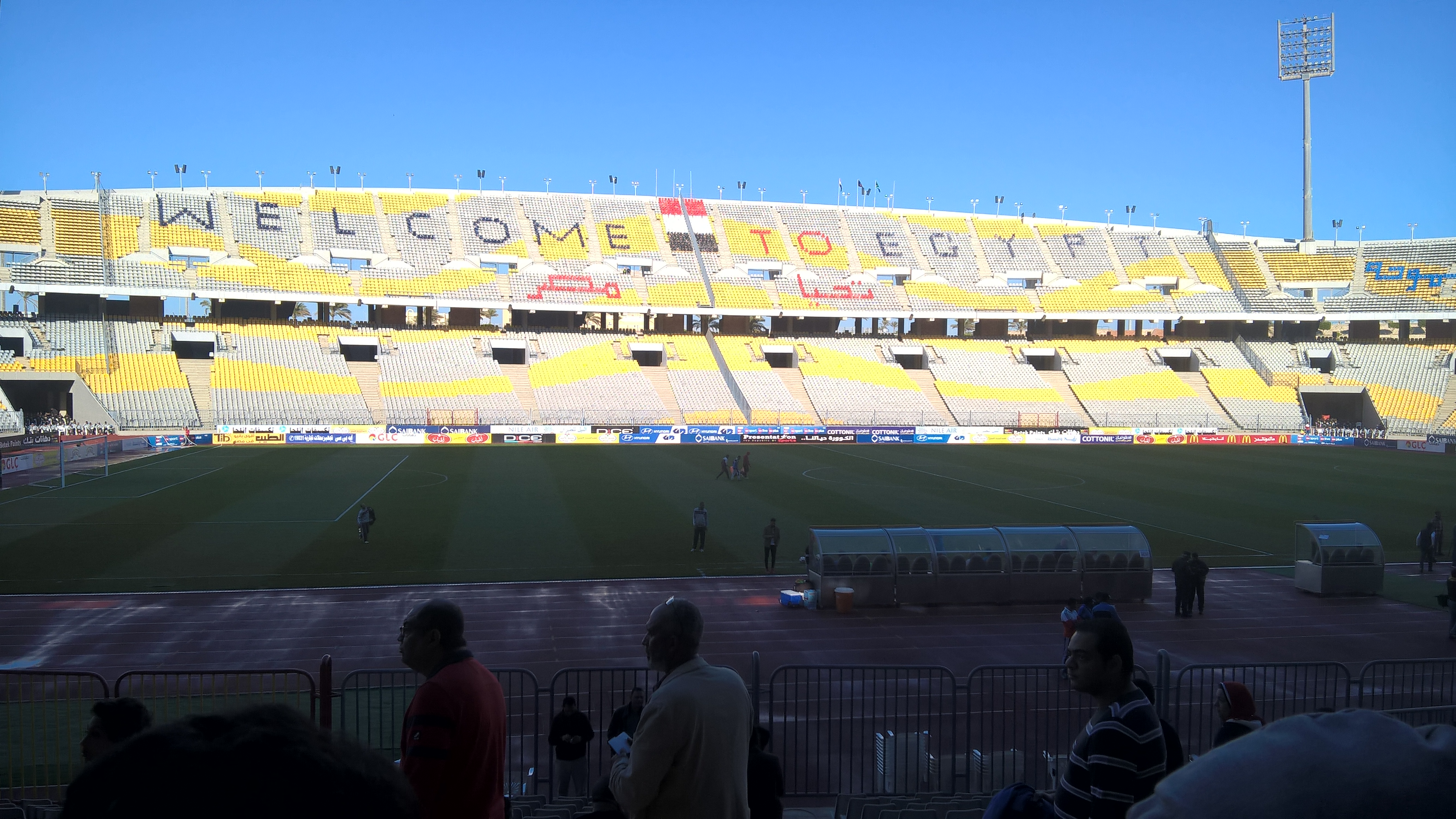
Borg El Arab Stadium in Alexandria, Egypt, hosted the second leg.

== Road to the final ==
Note: In all results below, the score of the finalist is given first (H: home; A: away).

(Morocco) RS Berkane				Round	(Egypt) Zamalek			
**Confederation Cup**
Opponent	Agg.	1st leg	2nd leg	Qualifying rounds	Opponent	Agg.	1st leg	2nd leg
(Libya) Al-Ittihad	4–0	3–0 (H)	1–0 (A)	First round	(Chad) AS CotonTchad	7–2	7–0 (H)	0–2 (A)
(Senegal) ASC Diaraf	5–3	0–2 (A)	5–1 (H)	Play-off round	(Morocco) Ittihad Tanger	3–1	0–0 (A)	3–1 (H)
Opponent	Result			Group stage	Opponent	Result		
(Republic of the Congo) AS Otôho	1–1 (A)			Matchday 1	(Kenya) Gor Mahia	2–4 (A)		
(Morocco) Hassania Agadir	2–1 (H)			Matchday 2	(Algeria) NA Hussein Dey	1–1 (H)		
(Morocco) Raja Casablanca	4–2 (A)			Matchday 3	(Angola) Petro de Luanda	1–1 (H)		
(Morocco) Raja Casablanca	0–0 (H)			Matchday 4	(Angola) Petro de Luanda	1–0 (A)		
(Republic of the Congo) AS Otôho	3–0 (H)			Matchday 5	(Kenya) Gor Mahia	4–0 (H)		
(Morocco) Hassania Agadir	0–1 (A)			Matchday 6	(Algeria) NA Hussein Dey	0–0 (A)		
**Group A winners**: Pos / Team / Pld / Pts; **1** / (Morocco) RS Berkane / **6** / **11**; 2 / (Morocco) Hassania Agadir / 6 / **8**; 3 / (Morocco) Raja Casablanca / 6 / **7**; 4 / (Republic of the Congo) AS Otohô / 6 / **5**; Source: CAF				Final standings	**Group D winners**: Pos / Team / Pld / Pts; **1** / (Egypt) Zamalek / **6** / **9**; 2 / (Kenya) Gor Mahia / 6 / **9**; 3 / (Algeria) NA Hussein Dey / 6 / **8**; 4 / (Angola) Petro de Luanda / 6 / **7**; Source: CAF			
Opponent	Agg.	1st leg	2nd leg	Knockout stage	Opponent	Agg.	1st leg	2nd leg
(Kenya) Gor Mahia	7–2	2–0 (A)	5–1 (H)	Quarter-finals	(Morocco) Hassania Agadir	1–0	0–0 (A)	1–0 (H)
(Tunisia) CS Sfaxien	3–2	0–2 (A)	3–0 (H)	Semi-finals	(Tunisia) Étoile du Sahel	1–0	1–0 (H)	0–0 (A)

== Format ==
The final will be played on a home-and-away two-legged basis, with the order of legs determined by the knockout stage draw, which was held on 20 March 2019, 19:00 CAT (UTC+2), at the Marriot Hotel in Cairo, Egypt.

If the aggregate score is tied after the second leg, the away goals rule will be applied, and if still tied, extra time won't be played, and the penalty shoot-out will be used to determine the winner.

== Matches ==
=== First leg ===
19 May 2019
22:00 UTC+0

RS Berkane (Morocco)	1–0	(Egypt) Zamalek
Laba 90+4'	Report

Stade Municipal de Berkane, Berkane
Attendance: 13,000
Referee: Janny Sikazwe (Zambia)

**RS Berkane**	**Zamalek**

GK	12	(Morocco) Abdelali Mhamdi
RB	23	(Morocco) Omar Namsaoui
CB	4	(Burkina Faso) Issoufou Dayo
CB	14	(Morocco) Ismael Mokadem	(yellow card) 21'
LB	5	(Morocco) Souhail Yechou		(substituted off) 58'
DM	26	(Morocco) Samir Ouidar		(substituted off) 87'
CM	17	(Morocco) Amine El Kass (c)
CM	29	(Morocco) Mohamed Farhane
AM	21	(Morocco) Bakr El Helali
CF	27	(Morocco) Hamdi Laachir		(substituted off) 90+5'
CF	9	(Togo) Kodjo Fo-Doh Laba
Substitutes:
GK	1	(Morocco) Ayoub Lakred
DF	25	(Morocco) Mohamed Aziz		(substituted on) 58'
MF	11	(Morocco) Salman Ouald El Haj		(substituted on) 87'
MF	15	(Morocco) Hamza Regragui
MF	18	(Morocco) Abdellah Mohammed
MF	22	(France) Redouane Zerzouri
FW	28	(Morocco) Bilal Bari		(substituted on) 90+5'
Manager:
(Morocco) Mounir Jaouani

GK	26	(Egypt) Omar Salah	(yellow card) 90+2'
RB	12	(Tunisia) Hamdi Nagguez	(yellow card) 60'
CB	4	(Egypt) Mahmoud Alaa
CB	5	(Egypt) Mohamed Abdel Ghani
LB	22	(Egypt) Abdallah Gomaa
CM	17	(Egypt) Mahmoud Abdel Aziz
CM	3	(Egypt) Tarek Hamed
RW	25	(Egypt) Ahmed Sayed		(substituted off) 68'
AM	10	(Egypt) Youssef Obama (c)
LW	11	(Egypt) Kahraba		(substituted off) 79'
CF	9	(Egypt) Omar El Said	(yellow card) 52'
Substitutes:
DF	7	(Egypt) Hazem Emam
DF	15	(Egypt) Bahaa Magdy
DF	28	(Egypt) Mahmoud Hamdy
MF	14	(Egypt) Ayman Hefny
MF	18	(Egypt) Ibrahim Hassan		(substituted on) 68'
MF	20	(Egypt) Mohamed Ibrahim		(substituted on) 79'
FW	19	(Morocco) Hamid Ahaddad
Manager:
(Switzerland) Christian Gross

Assistant referees:
Jerson Dos Santos (Angola)
Anouar Hmila (Tunisia)
Fourth official:
Bernard Camille (Seychelles)

**Match rules**

- 90 minutes.
- Seven named substitutes, of which up to three may be used.

=== Second leg ===
26 May 2019
22:00 UTC+2

Zamalek (Egypt)	1–0	(Morocco) RS Berkane
Alaa 55' (pen.)	Report
Penalties
Boutaïb (penalty scored); Alaa (penalty scored); Gomaa (penalty scored); Obama (penalty scored); Sayed (penalty scored)	5–3	(penalty missed) Laachir; (penalty scored) Mokadem; (penalty scored) Laba; (penalty scored) Dayo

Borg El Arab Stadium, Alexandria
Attendance: 70,000
Referee: Bamlak Tessema Weyesa (Ethiopia)

**Zamalek**	**RS Berkane**

GK	16	(Egypt) Mahmoud Genesh (c)	(yellow card) 42'
RB	5	(Egypt) Mohamed Abdel Ghani
CB	4	(Egypt) Mahmoud Alaa
CB	28	(Egypt) Mahmoud Hamdy
LB	22	(Egypt) Abdallah Gomaa
CM	3	(Egypt) Tarek Hamed
CM	20	(Egypt) Mohamed Ibrahim	(yellow card) 57'	(substituted off) 83'
RW	18	(Egypt) Ibrahim Hassan		(substituted off) 70'
AM	10	(Egypt) Youssef Obama
LW	11	(Egypt) Kahraba
CF	19	(Morocco) Hamid Ahaddad		(substituted off) 88'
Substitutes:
GK	26	(Egypt) Omar Salah
DF	7	(Egypt) Hazem Emam	(yellow card) PSO
DF	15	(Egypt) Bahaa Magdy
MF	14	(Egypt) Ayman Hefny
MF	17	(Egypt) Mahmoud Abdel Aziz		(substituted on) 83'
MF	25	(Egypt) Ahmed Sayed		(substituted on) 70'
FW	29	(Morocco) Khalid Boutaïb		(substituted on) 88'
Manager:
(Switzerland) Christian Gross

GK	12	(Morocco) Abdelali Mhamdi
RB	23	(Morocco) Omar Namsaoui	(yellow card) 86' (red card) 90'
CB	4	(Burkina Faso) Issoufou Dayo
CB	14	(Morocco) Ismael Mokadem
LB	25	(Morocco) Mohamed Aziz (c)
DM	8	(Morocco) Najji Larbi
CM	17	(Morocco) Amine El Kass	(yellow card) 35'	(substituted off) 84'
CM	26	(Morocco) Samir Ouidar		(substituted off) 69'
AM	21	(Morocco) Bakr El Helali	(yellow card) 42'	(substituted off) 90+4'
CF	9	(Togo) Kodjo Fo-Doh Laba
CF	27	(Morocco) Hamdi Laachir
Substitutes:
GK	1	(Morocco) Ayoub Lakred
DF	5	(Morocco) Souhail Yechou
MF	11	(Morocco) Salman Ouald El Haj		(substituted on) 84'
MF	15	(Morocco) Hamza Regragui		(substituted on) 90+4'
MF	18	(Morocco) Abdellah Mohammed
MF	29	(Morocco) Mohamed Farhane		(substituted on) 69'
FW	28	(Morocco) Bilal Bari
Manager:
(Morocco) Mounir Jaouani

Assistant referees:
Zakhele Siwela (South Africa)
El Hadji Samba (Senegal)
Fourth official:
Sadok Selmi (Tunisia)

**Match rules**

- 90 minutes.
- Penalty shoot-out if tied on aggregate and away goals.
- Seven named substitutes, of which up to three may be used.

== See also ==
- 2019 CAF Champions League Final
- 2020 CAF Super Cup
