= 2018–19 in Egyptian football =

Football in Egypt
- Season: 2018–19

Men's football
- Premier League: Al Ahly
- Second Division: Upper Egypt: Aswan; Cairo: FC Masr; Northern Egypt: Tanta
- Third Division: Upper Egypt: Asyut Petroleum; Cairo: Maleyat Kafr El Zayat; Northern Egypt: Biyala
- Cup: Zamalek
- Super Cup: Al Ahly

Women's football
- Premier League: Aviation Club

The 2018–19 season was the 101st season of competitive association football in Egypt.

== National teams ==
=== Egypt national football team ===
==== Results and fixtures ====
===== Friendlies =====
| 26 March 2019 International Friendly | Nigeria | 1–0 | Egypt | Asaba, Nigeria |
| 18:00 WAT (UTC+1) | Onuachu 1' | Report | | Stadium: Stephen Keshi Stadium; Referee: Charles Bulu (Ghana) |

| 13 June 2019 International Friendly | Egypt | 1–0 | Tanzania | Alexandria, Egypt |
| 21:00 CAT (UTC+2) | A. El Mohamady 64' | Report | | Stadium: Borg El Arab Stadium; Attendance: 10,000; Referee: Mohamed Adel (Egypt) |

| 16 June 2019 International Friendly | Egypt | 3–1 | Guinea | Alexandria, Egypt |
| 21:00 CAT (UTC+2) | M. Mohsen 11'; Ali 77'; Gaber 86' | Report | Kaba 63' | Stadium: Borg El Arab Stadium; Attendance: 10,000; Referee: Mohamed Adel (Egypt) |

===== 2018 FIFA World Cup =====
====== Group A ======
| Pos | Team | Pld | W | D | L | GF | GA | GD | Pts | Qualification |
|---|---|---|---|---|---|---|---|---|---|---|
| 1 | Uruguay | 3 | 3 | 0 | 0 | 5 | 0 | +5 | 9 | Advance to knockout stage |
| 2 | Russia (H) | 3 | 2 | 0 | 1 | 8 | 4 | +4 | 6 | Advance to knockout stage |
| 3 | Saudi Arabia | 3 | 1 | 0 | 2 | 2 | 7 | −5 | 3 | |
| 4 | Egypt | 3 | 0 | 0 | 3 | 2 | 6 | −4 | 0 | |

Source: FIFA
Rules for classification: Group stage tiebreakers
(H) Hosts

Matches

| 15 June 2018 2018 FIFA World Cup Group A | Egypt | 0–1 | Uruguay | Ekaterinburg, Russia |
| 17:00 YEKT (UTC+5) | | Report | Giménez 89' | Stadium: Ekaterinburg Arena; Attendance: 27,015; Referee: Björn Kuipers (Netherlands) |

| 19 June 2018 2018 FIFA World Cup Group A | Russia | 3–1 | Egypt | Saint Petersburg, Russia |
| 21:00 MSK (UTC+3) | Fathy 47' (o.g.); Cheryshev 59'; Dzyuba 62' | Report | M. Salah 73' (pen.) | Stadium: Krestovsky Stadium; Attendance: 64,468; Referee: Enrique Cáceres (Paraguay) |

| 25 June 2018 2018 FIFA World Cup Group A | Saudi Arabia | 2–1 | Egypt | Volgograd, Russia |
| 17:00 MSK (UTC+3) | Al Faraj 45+6' (pen.); Al Dawsari 90+5' | Report | M. Salah 22' | Stadium: Volgograd Arena; Attendance: 36,823; Referee: Wilmar Roldán (Colombia) |

===== 2019 Africa Cup of Nations qualification =====
====== Group J ======
| Pos | Team | Pld | W | D | L | GF | GA | GD | Pts | Qualification | Tunisia national football team | Egypt national football team | Niger national football team | Eswatini national football team |
|---|---|---|---|---|---|---|---|---|---|---|---|---|---|---|
| 1 | Tunisia | 6 | 5 | 0 | 1 | 12 | 4 | +8 | 15 | Final tournament | — | 1–0 | 1–0 | 4–0 |
| 2 | Egypt (Note: Egypt were named as hosts of the final tournament replacing Cameroon on 8 January 2019. At that time, they had already clinched a top two place in Group J and assured of qualification to the final tournament.) | 6 | 4 | 1 | 1 | 16 | 5 | +11 | 13 | Final tournament | 3–2 | — | 6–0 | 4–1 |
| 3 | Niger | 6 | 1 | 2 | 3 | 4 | 11 | −7 | 5 | | 1–2 | 1–1 | — | 0–0 |
| 4 | Eswatini (Note: The official name of Swaziland was changed to Eswatini in 2018 after they had played their first qualifying match, and since then both FIFA and CAF have used the name Eswatini for official use.) | 6 | 0 | 1 | 5 | 2 | 14 | −12 | 1 | | 0–2 | 0–2 | 1–2 | — |

Source: CAF
Rules for classification: Qualification tiebreakers
Notes:

| 8 September 2018 2019 Africa Cup of Nations qualification Group J | Egypt | 6–0 | Niger | Alexandria, Egypt |
| 20:00 CAT (UTC+2) | M. Moshen 13'; Ashraf 19'; M. Salah 29', 86'; S. Mohsen 73'; El Nenny 90+2' | Report | | Stadium: Borg El Arab Stadium; Attendance: 25,000; Referee: Maguette N'Diaye (Senegal) |

| 12 October 2018 2019 Africa Cup of Nations qualification Group J | Egypt | 4–1 | Eswatini | Cairo, Egypt |
| 19:00 CAT (UTC+2) | A. El Mohamady 7'; Warda 10'; Trézéguet 29'; M. Salah 45' | Report | Gamedze 85' | Stadium: Al Salam Stadium; Attendance: 20,000; Referee: Louis Hakizimana (Rwanda) |

| 16 October 2018 2019 Africa Cup of Nations qualification Group J | Eswatini | 0–2 | Egypt | Manzini, Eswatini |
| 15:00 SAST (UTC+2) | | Report | Hegazi 19'; M. Moshen 53' | Stadium: Mavuso Sports Centre; Referee: Mahmoud Ismail (Sudan) |

| 16 November 2018 2019 Africa Cup of Nations qualification Group J | Egypt | 3–2 | Tunisia | Alexandria, Egypt |
| 18:00 CAT (UTC+2) | Trézéguet 32'; B. El Mohamady 60'; M. Salah 90' | Report | Sliti 14', 72' | Stadium: Borg El Arab Stadium; Referee: Victor Gomes (South Africa) |

| 23 March 2019 2019 Africa Cup of Nations qualification Group J | Niger | 1–1 | Egypt | Niamey, Niger |
| 16:30 WAT (UTC+1) | Moutari 82' | Report | Trézéguet 47' | Stadium: Stade Général Seyni Kountché; Referee: Ring Nyier Akech Malong (South Sudan) |

=== Egypt national under-23 football team ===
==== Results and fixtures ====
===== Friendlies =====
| 7 September 2018 International Friendly | Russia U-21 | 1–1 | Egypt | Khimki, Russia |
| 18:00 MSK (UTC+3) | Panteleyev 54' | Report | Taher 57' | Stadium: Arena Khimki |

| 12 October 2018 International Friendly | United Arab Emirates | 0–0 | Egypt | Dubai, United Arab Emirates |
| 17:00 GST (UTC+4) | | Report | | Stadium: Rashid Stadium |

| 15 October 2018 International Friendly | United Arab Emirates | 0–1 | Egypt | Dubai, United Arab Emirates |
| 17:00 GST (UTC+4) | | Report | Taher 66' | Stadium: Rashid Stadium |

| 15 November 2018 International Friendly | Egypt | 4–1 | Tunisia | Alexandria, Egypt |
| 15:00 CAT (UTC+2) | Mostafa 26', 29'; El Eraky 90'; Mansi 90+1' | Report | El Mizoury 17' | Stadium: Tolip Stadium; Referee: Mohamed Adel (Egypt) |

| 18 November 2018 International Friendly | Egypt | 1–0 | Tunisia | Cairo, Egypt |
| 19:00 CAT (UTC+2) | Sadek 10' | Report | | Stadium: Al Salam Stadium; Referee: Mohamed Maarouf (Egypt) |

| 8 March 2019 International Friendly | Egypt | 2–0 | Malawi | Cairo, Egypt |
| 20:00 CAT (UTC+2) | Gamal 45+2' (pen.); El Gohary 90+3' | Report | | Stadium: Petro Sport Stadium; Referee: Mohamed El Hanafy (Egypt) |

| 22 March 2019 International Friendly | Egypt | 2–0 | United States | Murcia, Spain |
| 17:00 CET (UTC+1) | Rayyan 40'; Sadek 80' | Report | | Stadium: Pinatar Arena |

| 26 March 2019 International Friendly | Egypt | 0–1 | Netherlands U-21 | Murcia, Spain |
| 15:00 CET (UTC+1) | | Report | Gakpo 54' | Stadium: Pinatar Arena; Referee: Salvador Lax Franco (Spain) |

| 9 June 2019 International Friendly | Uzbekistan | 2–0 | Egypt | Andijan, Uzbekistan |
| 18:00 UZST (UTC+5) | Abdukhalikov 32'; Ganiev 90+3' | Report | | Stadium: Soghlom Avlod Stadium |

| 11 June 2019 International Friendly | Uzbekistan | 3–2 | Egypt | Andijan, Uzbekistan |
| 18:30 UZST (UTC+5) | Kobilov 17' (pen.); Ganiev 49'; Abdukhalikov 66' | Report | Abdel Salam 82'; Rayyan 90+2' | Stadium: Soghlom Avlod Stadium |

== CAF competitions ==
=== CAF Champions League ===
==== 2018 CAF Champions League ====
===== Preliminary round =====
| Team 1 | Agg. | Team 2 | 1st leg | 2nd leg |
|---|---|---|---|---|
| Génération Foot (Senegal) | 2–0 | (Egypt) Misr Lel-Makkasa | 2–0 | 0–0 |

===== First round =====
| Team 1 | Agg. | Team 2 | 1st leg | 2nd leg |
|---|---|---|---|---|
| Al-Ahly (Egypt) | 7–1 | (Gabon) CF Mounana | 4–0 | 3–1 |

===== Group stage =====
====== Group A ======
| Pos | Team | Pld | W | D | L | GF | GA | GD | Pts | Qualification | AHL | EST | KCC | ROL |
|---|---|---|---|---|---|---|---|---|---|---|---|---|---|---|
| 1 | (Egypt) Al Ahly | 6 | 4 | 1 | 1 | 9 | 5 | +4 | 13 | Quarter-finals | — | 0–0 | 4–3 | 3–0 |
| 2 | (Tunisia) Espérance de Tunis | 6 | 3 | 2 | 1 | 8 | 4 | +4 | 11 | Quarter-finals | 0–1 | — | 3–2 | 4–1 |
| 3 | (Uganda) KCCA | 6 | 2 | 0 | 4 | 8 | 9 | −1 | 6 | | 2–0 | 0–1 | — | 1–0 |
| 4 | (Botswana) Township Rollers | 6 | 1 | 1 | 4 | 2 | 9 | −7 | 4 | | 0–1 | 0–0 | 1–0 | — |

Source: CAF

===== Knockout phase =====
====== Quarter-finals ======
| Team 1 | Agg. | Team 2 | 1st leg | 2nd leg |
|---|---|---|---|---|
| Horoya (Guinea) | 0–4 | (Egypt) Al-Ahly | 0–0 | 0–4 |

====== Semi-finals ======
| Team 1 | Agg. | Team 2 | 1st leg | 2nd leg |
|---|---|---|---|---|
| Al-Ahly (Egypt) | 3–2 | (Algeria) ES Sétif | 2–0 | 1–2 |

====== Final ======
| Team 1 | Agg. | Team 2 | 1st leg | 2nd leg |
|---|---|---|---|---|
| Al-Ahly (Egypt) | 3–4 | (Tunisia) Espérance de Tunis | 3–1 | 0–3 |

==== 2018–19 CAF Champions League ====
===== Preliminary round =====
| Team 1 | Agg. | Team 2 | 1st leg | 2nd leg |
|---|---|---|---|---|
| Le Messager Ngozi (Burundi) | 1–3 | (Egypt) Ismaily | 0–1 | 1–2 |

===== First round =====
| Team 1 | Agg. | Team 2 | 1st leg | 2nd leg |
|---|---|---|---|---|
| Ismaily (Egypt) | 3–2 | (Cameroon) Coton Sport | 2–0 | 1–2 |
| Al-Ahly (Egypt) | 2–1 | (Ethiopia) Jimma Aba Jifar | 2–0 | 0–1 |

===== Group stage =====
====== Group C ======
| Pos | Team | Pld | W | D | L | GF | GA | GD | Pts | Qualification | TPM | CSC | CA | ISM |
|---|---|---|---|---|---|---|---|---|---|---|---|---|---|---|
| 1 | (Democratic Republic of the Congo) TP Mazembe | 6 | 3 | 2 | 1 | 13 | 4 | +9 | 11 | Quarter-finals | — | 2–0 | 8–0 | 2–0 |
| 2 | (Algeria) CS Constantine | 6 | 3 | 1 | 2 | 8 | 6 | +2 | 10 (Note: Goal difference in all group matches: CS Constantine +2, Club Africain –4.) | Quarter-finals | 3–0 | — | 0–1 | 3–2 |
| 3 | (Tunisia) Club Africain | 6 | 3 | 1 | 2 | 5 | 9 | −4 | 10 | | 0–0 | 0–1 | — | 1–0 |
| 4 | (Egypt) Ismaily (Note: The CAF announced on 23 January 2019 that Ismaily were disqualified for aggressive fans behaviors, including consistently throwing rocks and water bottles on the assistant referee and the away fans, and other incidents at their home match against Club Africain on 18 January 2019. All results of matches played by Ismaily were annulled and not taken into consideration according to the regulations. However, following an appeal by Ismaily, the CAF decided on 10 February 2019 to reinstate Ismaily to the competition.) | 6 | 0 | 2 | 4 | 4 | 11 | −7 | 2 | | 1–1 | 1–1 | 0–3 (awd.) (Note: On 19 February 2019, following the suspension of the match involving Ismaily and Club Africain due to the aggressive behaviors Ismaily fans shown during the match, CAF decided to consider the match forfeited by Ismaily with a result of 3–0 in favour of Club Africain. The match was originally suspended on the 83rd minute with the score 1–2 for Club Africain.) | — |

Source: CAF

====== Group D ======
| Pos | Team | Pld | W | D | L | GF | GA | GD | Pts | Qualification | AHL | SIM | JSS | VIT |
|---|---|---|---|---|---|---|---|---|---|---|---|---|---|---|
| 1 | (Egypt) Al-Ahly | 6 | 3 | 1 | 2 | 11 | 3 | +8 | 10 | Quarter-finals | — | 5–0 | 3–0 | 2–0 |
| 2 | (Tanzania) Simba | 6 | 3 | 0 | 3 | 6 | 13 | −7 | 9 | Quarter-finals | 1–0 | — | 3–0 | 2–1 |
| 3 | (Algeria) JS Saoura | 6 | 2 | 2 | 2 | 6 | 9 | −3 | 8 | | 1–1 | 2–0 | — | 1–0 |
| 4 | (Democratic Republic of the Congo) AS Vita Club | 6 | 2 | 1 | 3 | 9 | 7 | +2 | 7 | | 1–0 | 5–0 | 2–2 | — |

Source: CAF

===== Knockout phase =====
====== Quarter-finals ======
| Team 1 | Agg. | Team 2 | 1st leg | 2nd leg |
|---|---|---|---|---|
| Mamelodi Sundowns (South Africa) | 5–1 | (Egypt) Al-Ahly | 5–0 | 0–1 |

=== CAF Confederation Cup ===
==== 2018 CAF Confederation Cup ====
===== Preliminary round =====
| Team 1 | Agg. | Team 2 | 1st leg | 2nd leg |
|---|---|---|---|---|
| Al-Masry (Egypt) | 5–2 | (Zambia) Green Buffaloes | 4–0 | 1–2 |

===== First round =====
| Team 1 | Agg. | Team 2 | 1st leg | 2nd leg |
|---|---|---|---|---|
| Simba (Tanzania) | 2–2 (a) | (Egypt) Al-Masry | 2–2 | 0–0 |
| Wolaitta Dicha (Ethiopia) | 3–3 (4–3 p) | (Egypt) Zamalek | 2–1 | 1–2 |

===== Play-off round =====
| Team 1 | Agg. | Team 2 | 1st leg | 2nd leg |
|---|---|---|---|---|
| CF Mounana (Gabon) | 2–3 | (Egypt) Al-Masry | 1–1 | 1–2 |

===== Group stage =====
====== Group B ======
| Pos | Team | Pld | W | D | L | GF | GA | GD | Pts | Qualification | RSB | MAS | SON | HIL |
|---|---|---|---|---|---|---|---|---|---|---|---|---|---|---|
| 1 | (Morocco) RS Berkane | 6 | 4 | 1 | 1 | 7 | 2 | +5 | 13 | Quarter-finals | — | 0–0 | 2–1 | 1–0 |
| 2 | (Egypt) Al-Masry | 6 | 3 | 3 | 0 | 7 | 2 | +5 | 12 | Quarter-finals | 1–0 | — | 2–0 | 2–0 |
| 3 | (Mozambique) UD Songo | 6 | 0 | 3 | 3 | 5 | 10 | −5 | 3 (Note: Head-to-head results: Al-Hilal 2–2 UD Songo, UD Songo 1–1 Al-Hilal (UD Songo won on away goals).) | | 0–2 | 1–1 | — | 1–1 |
| 4 | (Sudan) Al-Hilal | 6 | 0 | 3 | 3 | 4 | 9 | −5 | 3 | | 0–2 | 1–1 | 2–2 | — |

Source: CAF

===== Knockout phase =====
====== Quarter-finals ======
| Team 1 | Agg. | Team 2 | 1st leg | 2nd leg |
|---|---|---|---|---|
| Al-Masry (Egypt) | 2–0 | (Algeria) USM Alger | 1–0 | 1–0 |

====== Semi-finals ======
| Team 1 | Agg. | Team 2 | 1st leg | 2nd leg |
|---|---|---|---|---|
| Al-Masry (Egypt) | 0–4 | (Democratic Republic of the Congo) AS Vita Club | 0–0 | 0–4 |

==== 2018–19 CAF Confederation Cup ====
===== First round =====
| Team 1 | Agg. | Team 2 | 1st leg | 2nd leg |
|---|---|---|---|---|
| Zamalek (Egypt) | 7–2 | (Chad) AS CotonTchad | 7–0 | 0–2 |
| Al-Masry (Egypt) | 0–2 | (Burkina Faso) Salitas | 0–2 | 0–0 |

===== Play-off round =====
| Team 1 | Agg. | Team 2 | 1st leg | 2nd leg |
|---|---|---|---|---|
| Ittihad Tanger (Morocco) | 1–3 | (Egypt) Zamalek | 0–0 | 1–3 |

===== Group stage =====
====== Group D ======
| Pos | Team | Pld | W | D | L | GF | GA | GD | Pts | Qualification | ZAM | GOR | NAH | PET |
|---|---|---|---|---|---|---|---|---|---|---|---|---|---|---|
| 1 | (Egypt) Zamalek | 6 | 2 | 3 | 1 | 9 | 6 | +3 | 9 (Note: Head-to-head goal difference: Zamalek +2, Gor Mahia –2.) | Quarter-finals | — | 4–0 | 1–1 | 1–1 |
| 2 | (Kenya) Gor Mahia | 6 | 3 | 0 | 3 | 8 | 9 | −1 | 9 | Quarter-finals | 4–2 | — | 2–0 | 1–0 |
| 3 | (Algeria) NA Hussein Dey | 6 | 2 | 2 | 2 | 4 | 6 | −2 | 8 | | 0–0 | 1–0 | — | 2–1 |
| 4 | (Angola) Petro de Luanda | 6 | 2 | 1 | 3 | 6 | 6 | 0 | 7 | | 0–1 | 2–1 | 2–0 | — |

Source: CAF

===== Knockout phase =====
====== Quarter-finals ======
| Team 1 | Agg. | Team 2 | 1st leg | 2nd leg |
|---|---|---|---|---|
| Hassania Agadir (Morocco) | 0–1 | (Egypt) Zamalek | 0–0 | 0–1 |

====== Semi-finals ======
| Team 1 | Agg. | Team 2 | 1st leg | 2nd leg |
|---|---|---|---|---|
| Zamalek (Egypt) | 1–0 | (Tunisia) Étoile du Sahel | 1–0 | 0–0 |

====== Final ======
| Team 1 | Agg. | Team 2 | 1st leg | 2nd leg |
|---|---|---|---|---|
| RS Berkane (Morocco) | 1–1 (3–5 p) | (Egypt) Zamalek | 1–0 | 0–1 |

== UAFA competitions ==
=== Arab Club Champions Cup ===
==== Play-off round ====
===== Group B =====
| Pos | Team | Pld | W | D | L | GF | GA | GD | Pts | Qualification | ITH | FUS | SAL | ADT |
|---|---|---|---|---|---|---|---|---|---|---|---|---|---|---|
| 1 | (Egypt) Al-Ittihad Alexandria | 3 | 2 | 1 | 0 | 14 | 1 | +13 | 7 | Advance to First round | — | 1–1 | | 8–0 |
| 2 | (Morocco) FUS Rabat | 3 | 2 | 1 | 0 | 13 | 1 | +12 | 7 | | | — | 5–0 | |
| 3 | (Kuwait) Al-Salmiya | 3 | 1 | 0 | 2 | 4 | 10 | −6 | 3 | | 0–5 | | — | 4–0 |
| 4 | ASAS Djibouti Télécom | 3 | 0 | 0 | 3 | 0 | 19 | −19 | 0 | | | 0–7 | | — |

Source: Goalzz

==== First round ====
| Team 1 | Agg. | Team 2 | 1st leg | 2nd leg |
|---|---|---|---|---|
| Zamalek (Egypt) | 1–1 (a) | (Kuwait) Al-Qadsia | 0–0 | 1–1 |
| Ismaily (Egypt) | 2–2 (4–2 p) | Al-Kuwait | 2–0 | 0–2 |
| Al-Ittihad Alexandria (Egypt) | 3–3 (a) | (Tunisia) Espérance de Tunis | 1–1 | 2–2 |
| Al-Ahly (Egypt) | 4–1 | (Lebanon) Al-Nejmeh | 0–0 | 4–1 |

==== Second round ====
| Team 1 | Agg. | Team 2 | 1st leg | 2nd leg |
|---|---|---|---|---|
| Al-Ahly (Egypt) | 3–3 (a) | (United Arab Emirates) Al-Wasl | 2–2 | 1–1 |
| Ismaily (Egypt) | 0–0 (2–4 p) | (Morocco) Raja Casablanca | 0–0 | 0-0 |
| Al-Ittihad Alexandria (Egypt) | 1–0 (4–3 p) | (Egypt) Zamalek | 0–1 | 1–0 |

==== Quarter-finals ====
| Team 1 | Agg. | Team 2 | 1st leg | 2nd leg |
|---|---|---|---|---|
| Al-Hilal (Saudi Arabia) | 3–0 | (Egypt) Al-Ittihad Alexandria | 3–0 | 0–0 |

== Men's football ==
=== Egyptian Premier League ===
| Pos | Team | Pld | W | D | L | GF | GA | GD | Pts | Qualification or relegation |
|---|---|---|---|---|---|---|---|---|---|---|
| 1 | Al Ahly (C) | 34 | 25 | 5 | 4 | 56 | 20 | +36 | 80 | Qualification for the Champions League |
| 2 | Zamalek | 34 | 21 | 9 | 4 | 65 | 31 | +34 | 72 | Qualification for the Champions League |
| 3 | Pyramids | 34 | 19 | 13 | 2 | 61 | 31 | +30 | 70 | Qualification for the Confederation Cup (Note: Since the 2018–19 Egypt Cup wouldn't finish by the CAF deadline, the spot awarded to the Egypt Cup winners (Confederation Cup preliminary or first round) was passed to the fourth-placed team, Al Masry.) |
| 4 | Al Masry | 34 | 12 | 16 | 6 | 45 | 38 | +7 | 52 | Qualification for the Confederation Cup |
| 5 | Al Mokawloon Al Arab | 34 | 13 | 9 | 12 | 45 | 38 | +7 | 48 | |
| 6 | Misr Lel Makkasa | 34 | 12 | 10 | 12 | 34 | 36 | −2 | 46 | |
| 7 | Ismaily | 34 | 10 | 13 | 11 | 30 | 36 | −6 | 43 | |
| 8 | Tala'ea El Gaish | 34 | 10 | 11 | 13 | 41 | 39 | +2 | 41 | |
| 9 | ENPPI | 34 | 9 | 13 | 12 | 39 | 42 | −3 | 40 (Note: Tied on head-to-head points (3), on head-to-head goal difference (0), on head-to-head goals scored (3) and on head-to-head away goals scored (2). Overall goal difference: ENPPI –3, Wadi Degla –6.) | |
| 10 | Wadi Degla | 34 | 10 | 10 | 14 | 41 | 47 | −6 | 40 | |
| 11 | Al Ittihad | 34 | 9 | 12 | 13 | 41 | 56 | −15 | 39 | |
| 12 | Smouha | 34 | 8 | 14 | 12 | 33 | 41 | −8 | 38 (Note: Head-to-head points: Smouha 10, El Entag El Harby 8, El Gouna 7, Haras El Hodoud 5.) | |
| 13 | El Entag El Harby | 34 | 8 | 14 | 12 | 36 | 44 | −8 | 38 | |
| 14 | El Gouna | 34 | 8 | 14 | 12 | 38 | 52 | −14 | 38 | |
| 15 | Haras El Hodoud | 34 | 8 | 14 | 12 | 30 | 37 | −7 | 38 | |
| 16 | Petrojet (R) | 34 | 8 | 11 | 15 | 30 | 43 | −13 | 35 | Relegation to the Second Division |
| 17 | El Dakhleya (R) | 34 | 4 | 15 | 15 | 34 | 52 | −18 | 27 | Relegation to the Second Division |
| 18 | Nogoom (R) | 34 | 5 | 11 | 18 | 30 | 46 | −16 | 26 | Relegation to the Second Division |

Source: Soccerway
Rules for classification: 1) Points; 2) Head-to-Head points; 3) Head-to-Head goal difference; 4) Head-to-Head goals scored; 5) Head-to-Head away goals scored; 6) Goal difference; 7) Goals scored (Note: Head-to-head record is used only after all the matches between the teams in question have been played).
(C) Champions; (R) Relegated

=== Egyptian Second Division ===
==== Group A ====
| Pos | Team | Pld | W | D | L | GF | GA | GD | Pts | Promotion, qualification or relegation |
|---|---|---|---|---|---|---|---|---|---|---|
| 1 | Aswan (C, P) | 26 | 17 | 7 | 2 | 46 | 20 | +26 | 58 | Promotion to the Premier League |
| 2 | Beni Suef | 26 | 13 | 11 | 2 | 42 | 22 | +20 | 50 | |
| 3 | Media | 26 | 12 | 7 | 7 | 38 | 30 | +8 | 43 (Note: Head-to-head points: Media 4, Telephonat Beni Suef 1.) | |
| 4 | Telephonat Beni Suef | 26 | 11 | 10 | 5 | 32 | 21 | +11 | 43 | |
| 5 | El Minya | 26 | 10 | 11 | 5 | 44 | 32 | +12 | 41 | |
| 6 | Al Aluminium | 26 | 10 | 9 | 7 | 36 | 28 | +8 | 39 | |
| 7 | Dayrout | 26 | 9 | 9 | 8 | 31 | 36 | −5 | 36 | |
| 8 | Tahta | 26 | 9 | 6 | 11 | 29 | 33 | −4 | 33 (Note: Head-to-head points: Tahta 4, Sohag 1.) | |
| 9 | Sohag | 26 | 7 | 12 | 7 | 21 | 19 | +2 | 33 | |
| 10 | Faiyum | 26 | 7 | 10 | 9 | 28 | 27 | +1 | 31 (Note: Head-to-head points: Faiyum 4, Al Nasr Lel Taa'den 1.) | |
| 11 | Al Nasr Lel Taa'den (R) | 26 | 7 | 10 | 9 | 35 | 34 | +1 | 31 | Relegation to the Third Division |
| 12 | El Tahrir (R) | 26 | 6 | 8 | 12 | 26 | 37 | −11 | 26 | Relegation to the Third Division |
| 13 | MS Naser Malawy (R) | 26 | 3 | 5 | 18 | 20 | 48 | −28 | 14 | Relegation to the Third Division |
| 14 | Al Walideya (R) | 26 | 3 | 1 | 22 | 21 | 62 | −41 | 10 | Relegation to the Third Division |

Source: Kooora
Rules for classification: 1) Points; 2) Head-to-Head points; 3) Head-to-Head goal difference; 4) Head-to-Head goals scored; 5) Head-to-Head away goals scored; 6) Goal difference; 7) Goals scored; 8) Draw of lots (only if needed to decide teams for promotion or teams for relegation).
(Note: Head-to-head record is used only after all the matches between the teams in question have been played).
(C) Champions; (P) Promoted; (R) Relegated

==== Group B ====
| Pos | Team | Pld | W | D | L | GF | GA | GD | Pts | Promotion, qualification or relegation |
|---|---|---|---|---|---|---|---|---|---|---|
| 1 | FC Masr (C, P) | 26 | 14 | 10 | 2 | 49 | 25 | +24 | 52 | Promotion to the Premier League |
| 2 | Ceramica Cleopatra | 26 | 15 | 6 | 5 | 42 | 20 | +22 | 51 | |
| 3 | El Qanah | 26 | 15 | 5 | 6 | 39 | 21 | +18 | 50 | |
| 4 | Tersana | 26 | 13 | 9 | 4 | 38 | 15 | +23 | 48 | |
| 5 | Coca-Cola | 26 | 13 | 8 | 5 | 37 | 21 | +16 | 47 | |
| 6 | Al Merreikh | 26 | 8 | 12 | 6 | 24 | 18 | +6 | 36 | |
| 7 | Gomhoriat Shebin | 26 | 8 | 10 | 8 | 24 | 21 | +3 | 34 | |
| 8 | Al Nasr | 26 | 8 | 9 | 9 | 32 | 32 | 0 | 33 | |
| 9 | Al Zarka | 26 | 8 | 6 | 12 | 21 | 31 | −10 | 30 (Note: Head-to-head points: Al Zarka 8, Suez 5, El Shams 3.) | |
| 10 | Suez | 26 | 7 | 9 | 10 | 26 | 27 | −1 | 30 | |
| 11 | El Shams (R) | 26 | 8 | 6 | 12 | 25 | 30 | −5 | 30 | Relegation to the Third Division |
| 12 | Porto Suez (R) | 26 | 6 | 8 | 12 | 27 | 34 | −7 | 26 | Relegation to the Third Division |
| 13 | Damietta (R) | 26 | 5 | 5 | 16 | 15 | 47 | −32 | 20 | Relegation to the Third Division |
| 14 | Abou Sakal (R) | 26 | 0 | 5 | 21 | 13 | 70 | −57 | 5 | Relegation to the Third Division |

Source: Kooora
Rules for classification: 1) Points; 2) Head-to-Head points; 3) Head-to-Head goal difference; 4) Head-to-Head goals scored; 5) Head-to-Head away goals scored; 6) Goal difference; 7) Goals scored; 8) Draw of lots (only if needed to decide teams for promotion or teams for relegation).
(Note: Head-to-head record is used only after all the matches between the teams in question have been played).
(C) Champions; (P) Promoted; (R) Relegated

==== Group C ====
| Pos | Team | Pld | W | D | L | GF | GA | GD | Pts | Promotion, qualification or relegation |
|---|---|---|---|---|---|---|---|---|---|---|
| 1 | Tanta (C, P) | 26 | 14 | 10 | 2 | 27 | 12 | +15 | 52 | Promotion to the Premier League |
| 2 | El Raja | 26 | 13 | 6 | 7 | 38 | 23 | +15 | 45 | |
| 3 | Olympic Club | 26 | 12 | 8 | 6 | 34 | 20 | +14 | 44 (Note: Tied on head-to-head points (3), on head-to-head goal difference (0), on head-to-head goals scored (1) and on head-to-head away goals scored (0). Overall goal difference: Olympic Club +14, Abou Qir Fertilizers +10.) | |
| 4 | Abou Qir Fertilizers | 26 | 13 | 5 | 8 | 33 | 23 | +10 | 44 | |
| 5 | Ghazl El Mahalla | 26 | 11 | 9 | 6 | 28 | 21 | +7 | 42 (Note: Head-to-head points: Ghazl El Mahalla 8, Baladeyet El Mahalla 7, Ala'ab Damanhour 4.) | |
| 6 | Baladeyet El Mahalla | 26 | 10 | 12 | 4 | 30 | 20 | +10 | 42 | |
| 7 | Ala'ab Damanhour | 26 | 12 | 6 | 8 | 33 | 30 | +3 | 42 | |
| 8 | El Mansoura | 26 | 11 | 7 | 8 | 25 | 21 | +4 | 40 | |
| 9 | Pharco | 26 | 8 | 9 | 9 | 30 | 29 | +1 | 33 | |
| 10 | Al Hammam | 26 | 8 | 8 | 10 | 29 | 32 | −3 | 32 | |
| 11 | Kafr El Sheikh (R) | 26 | 7 | 9 | 10 | 31 | 32 | −1 | 30 | Relegation to the Third Division |
| 12 | Al Jazeera (R) | 26 | 6 | 6 | 14 | 14 | 29 | −15 | 24 | Relegation to the Third Division |
| 13 | MS Tala (R) | 26 | 2 | 8 | 16 | 25 | 52 | −27 | 14 | Relegation to the Third Division |
| 14 | Sidi Salem (R) | 26 | 1 | 5 | 20 | 14 | 47 | −33 | 8 | Relegation to the Third Division |

Source: Kooora
Rules for classification: 1) Points; 2) Head-to-Head points; 3) Head-to-Head goal difference; 4) Head-to-Head goals scored; 5) Head-to-Head away goals scored; 6) Goal difference; 7) Goals scored; 8) Draw of lots (only if needed to decide teams for promotion or teams for relegation).
(Note: Head-to-head record is used only after all the matches between the teams in question have been played).
(C) Champions; (P) Promoted; (R) Relegated

=== Cup competitions ===
==== Egypt Cup ====
===== Final =====
8 September 2019
20:00 CAT

| Pyramids | 0–3 | Zamalek |
|---|---|---|
| | Report | Obama 52'; Bencharki 63', 83' |

Borg El Arab Stadium, Alexandria
Attendance: 20,000
Referee: Radu Petrescu (Romania)

==== Egyptian Super Cup ====
12 January 2018
20:00 GST

| Al Ahly | 1–0 (a.e.t.) | Al Masry |
|---|---|---|
| Azaro 101' | Report |

Hazza Bin Zayed Stadium, Al Ain
Attendance: 18,000
Referee: Ammar Al Jeneibi (United Arab Emirates)
