= 2018–19 CAF Confederation Cup knockout stage =

African football tournament

The 2018–19 CAF Confederation Cup knockout stage will be played from 7 April to 26 May 2019. A total of eight teams will compete in the knockout stage to decide the champions of the 2018–19 CAF Confederation Cup.

== Qualified teams ==
The winners and runners-up of each of the four groups in the group stage advance to the quarter-finals.

Group	Winners	Runners-up
A	(Morocco) RS Berkane	(Morocco) Hassania Agadir
B	(Tunisia) CS Sfaxien	(Tunisia) Étoile du Sahel
C	(Sudan) Al-Hilal	(Zambia) Nkana
D	(Egypt) Zamalek	(Kenya) Gor Mahia

== Format ==
In the knockout stage, the eight teams play a single-elimination tournament. Each tie is played on a home-and-away two-legged basis. If the aggregate score is tied after the second leg, the away goals rule will be applied, and if still tied, extra time will not be played, and the penalty shoot-out will be used to determine the winner (Regulations III. 26 & 27).

== Schedule ==
The schedule of each round is as follows. Effective from the Confederation Cup group stage, weekend matches are played on Sundays while midweek matches are played on Wednesdays, with some exceptions. Kick-off times are also fixed at 13:00, 16:00 and 19:00 GMT.

Round	First leg	Second leg
Quarter-finals	7 April 2019	14 April 2019
Semi-finals	28 April 2019	5 May 2019
Final	19 May 2019	26 May 2019

== Bracket ==
The bracket of the knockout stage is determined as follows:

Round	Matchups
Quarter-finals	(Group winners host second leg, matchups decided by draw, teams from same group cannot play each other): QF1; QF2; QF3; QF4
Semi-finals	(Matchups and order of legs decided by draw, between winners QF1, QF2, QF3, QF4): SF1; SF2
Final	(Winners SF1 host first leg, Winners SF2 host second leg): Winner SF1 vs. Winner SF2

The bracket was decided after the draw for the knockout stage (quarter-finals and semi-finals), which was held on 20 March 2019, 19:00 CAT (UTC+2), at the Marriot Hotel in Cairo, Egypt.

Quarter-finals
(Zambia) Nkana	2	0	2
(Tunisia) CS Sfaxien	1	2	3
(Kenya) Gor Mahia	0	1	1
(Morocco) RS Berkane	2	5	7
(Morocco) Hassania Agadir	0	0	0
(Egypt) Zamalek	0	1	1
(Tunisia) Étoile du Sahel	3	2	5
(Sudan) Al-Hilal	1	1	2

Semi-finals
(Tunisia) CS Sfaxien	2	0	2
(Morocco) RS Berkane	0	3	3
(Egypt) Zamalek	1	0	1
(Tunisia) Étoile du Sahel	0	0	0

Final
(Morocco) RS Berkane	1	0	1 (3)
(Egypt) Zamalek (p)	0	1	1 (5)

== Quarter-finals ==
In the quarter-finals, the winners of one group played the runners-up of another group (teams from same group could not play each other), with the group winners hosting the second leg, and the matchups decided by draw.

Team 1	Agg.	Team 2	1st leg	2nd leg
Nkana (Zambia)	2–3	(Tunisia) CS Sfaxien	2–1	0–2
Étoile du Sahel (Tunisia)	5–2	(Sudan) Al-Hilal	3–1	2–1
Hassania Agadir (Morocco)	0–1	(Egypt) Zamalek	0–0	0–1
Gor Mahia (Kenya)	1–7	(Morocco) RS Berkane	0–2	1–5

7 April 2019
15:00 UTC+2

Nkana (Zambia)	2–1	(Tunisia) CS Sfaxien
K. Kampamba 36'; Tshimenga 52'	Report	Oueslati 84'

Nkana Stadium, Kitwe
Referee: Bernard Camille (Seychelles)
14 April 2019
17:00 UTC+1

CS Sfaxien (Tunisia)	2–0	(Zambia) Nkana
Chaouat 7'; Marzouki 90+1'	Report

Stade Taïeb Mhiri, Sfax
Referee: Victor Gomes (South Africa)

CS Sfaxien won 3–2 on aggregate.

7 April 2019
17:00 UTC+1

Étoile du Sahel (Tunisia)	3–1	(Sudan) Al-Hilal
Boughattas 30'; Chikhaoui 34' (pen.), 81' (pen.)	Report	El Tahir 59'

Stade Olympique de Sousse, Sousse
Referee: Rédouane Jiyed (Morocco)
23 April 2019 (Note: The Al-Hilal v Étoile du Sahel second leg, originally scheduled to be played on 14 April 2019, 15:00 UTC+2, at Al-Hilal Stadium, Omdurman, was postponed due to the political situation in Sudan. It was rescheduled to be played on 23 April 2019, 18:00 UTC+2, at the Egyptian Army Stadium, Suez in Egypt.)
18:00 UTC+2

Al-Hilal (Sudan)	1–2	(Tunisia) Étoile du Sahel
Al-Shoala 30'	Report	Aribi 36'; Kechrida 80'

Egyptian Army Stadium, Suez (Egypt)
Referee: Mahmoud El Banna (Egypt)

Étoile du Sahel won 5–2 on aggregate.

7 April 2019
20:00 UTC+1

Hassania Agadir (Morocco)	0–0	(Egypt) Zamalek
	Report

Stade Adrar, Agadir
Attendance: 60,000
Referee: Sadok Selmi (Tunisia)
14 April 2019
21:00 UTC+2

Zamalek (Egypt)	1–0	(Morocco) Hassania Agadir
Hassan 49'	Report

Egyptian Army Stadium, Suez
Attendance: 16,000
Referee: Hélder Martins de Carvalho (Angola)

Zamalek won 1–0 on aggregate.

7 April 2019
16:00 UTC+3

Gor Mahia (Kenya)	0–2	(Morocco) RS Berkane
	Report	Kahata 24' (o.g.); El Helali 59'

Moi International Sports Centre, Kasarani
Referee: Joshua Bondo (Botswana)
14 April 2019
20:00 UTC+1

RS Berkane (Morocco)	5–1	(Kenya) Gor Mahia
Laba 21'; Aziz 32'; El Helali 37'; Dayo 58'; Essaiydy 86'	Report	Juma 24'

Stade Municipal de Berkane, Berkane
Referee: Jean-Jacques Ndala Ngambo (DR Congo)

RS Berkane won 7–1 on aggregate.

== Semi-finals ==
In the semi-finals, the four quarter-final winners played in two ties, with the matchups and order of legs decided by draw.

Team 1	Agg.	Team 2	1st leg	2nd leg
CS Sfaxien (Tunisia)	2–3	(Morocco) RS Berkane	2–0	0–3
Zamalek (Egypt)	1–0	(Tunisia) Étoile du Sahel	1–0	0–0

28 April 2019
17:00 UTC+1

CS Sfaxien (Tunisia)	2–0	(Morocco) RS Berkane
Marzouki 29'; Mathlouthi 47' (pen.)	Report

Stade Taïeb Mhiri, Sfax
Referee: Bamlak Tessema Weyesa (Ethiopia)
5 May 2019
16:00 UTC+0

RS Berkane (Morocco)	3–0	(Tunisia) CS Sfaxien
Laba 8' (pen.); Namsaoui 19'; Dayo 31'	Report

Stade Municipal de Berkane, Berkane
Referee: Maguette N'Diaye (Senegal)

RS Berkane won 3–2 on aggregate.

28 April 2019
21:00 UTC+2

Zamalek (Egypt)	1–0	(Tunisia) Étoile du Sahel
Kahraba 36'	Report

Borg El Arab Stadium, Alexandria
Referee: Janny Sikazwe (Zambia)
5 May 2019
20:00 UTC+1

Étoile du Sahel (Tunisia)	0–0	(Egypt) Zamalek
	Report

Stade Olympique de Sousse, Sousse
Referee: Jean-Jacques Ndala Ngambo (DR Congo)

Zamalek won 1–0 on aggregate.

== Final ==
In the final, the two semi-final winners play each other, with the order of legs determined by the semi-final draw.

19 May 2019
22:00 UTC+0

RS Berkane (Morocco)	1–0	(Egypt) Zamalek
Laba 90+4'	Report

Stade Municipal de Berkane, Berkane
Attendance: 13,000
Referee: Janny Sikazwe (Zambia)
26 May 2019
22:00 UTC+2

Zamalek (Egypt)	1–0	(Morocco) RS Berkane
Alaa 55' (pen.)	Report
Penalties
Boutaïb (penalty scored); Alaa (penalty scored); Gomaa (penalty scored); Obama (penalty scored); Sayed (penalty scored)	5–3	(penalty missed) Laachir; (penalty scored) Mokadem; (penalty scored) Laba; (penalty scored) Dayo

Borg El Arab Stadium, Alexandria
Attendance: 70,000
Referee: Bamlak Tessema Weyesa (Ethiopia)

1–1 on aggregate. Zamalek won 5–3 on penalties.
