= 2018–19 CAF Confederation Cup group stage =

- Dates: 3 February – 17 March 2019

Tournament statistics
- Matches played: 48
- Goals scored: 105 (2.19 per match)

The 2018–19 CAF Confederation Cup group stage were played from 3 February to 17 March 2019. A total of 16 teams competed in the group stage to decide the eight places in the knockout stage of the 2018–19 CAF Confederation Cup.

== Draw ==
The draw for the group stage was held on 21 January 2019, 12:00 CAT (UTC+2), at the CAF headquarters in Cairo, Egypt. The 16 teams, including the winners of the first round with the best CAF 5-year ranking, Étoile du Sahel, and the 15 winners of the play-off round of qualifying, were drawn into four groups of four.

The teams were seeded by their performances in the CAF competitions for the previous five seasons (CAF 5-year ranking points shown in parentheses). Each group contained one team from each of Pot 1 and Pot 2, and two teams from Pot 3, and each team was drawn into one of the positions in their group.

Pot	Pot 1	Pot 2	Pot 3
Teams	(Tunisia) Étoile du Sahel (50.5 pts); (Egypt) Zamalek (30 pts); (Zambia) ZESCO United (30 pts); (Morocco) Raja Casablanca (25 pts)	(Sudan) Al-Hilal (16.5 pts); (Tunisia) CS Sfaxien (13 pts); (Morocco) RS Berkane (10 pts); (Kenya) Gor Mahia (5 pts)	(Zambia) Nkana (1 pt); (Algeria) NA Hussein Dey; (Angola) Petro de Luanda; (Burkina Faso) Salitas; (Republic of the Congo) AS Otohô; (Ghana) Asante Kotoko; (Morocco) Hassania Agadir; (Nigeria) Enugu Rangers

== Format ==
In the group stage, each group was played on a home-and-away round-robin basis. The winners and runners-up of each group advanced to the quarter-finals of the knockout stage.

=== Tiebreakers ===
The teams were ranked according to points (3 points for a win, 1 point for a draw, 0 points for a loss). If tied on points, tiebreakers were applied in the following order (Regulations III. 20 & 21):

1. Points in head-to-head matches among tied teams;
2. Goal difference in head-to-head matches among tied teams;
3. Goals scored in head-to-head matches among tied teams;
4. Away goals scored in head-to-head matches among tied teams;
5. If more than two teams are tied, and after applying all head-to-head criteria above, a subset of teams are still tied, all head-to-head criteria above are reapplied exclusively to this subset of teams;
6. Goal difference in all group matches;
7. Goals scored in all group matches;
8. Away goals scored in all group matches;
9. Drawing of lots.

== Schedule ==
The schedule of each matchday was as follows (matches scheduled in midweek in italics). Effective from the Confederation Cup group stage, weekend matches were played on Sundays while midweek matches were played on Wednesdays, with some exceptions. Kick-off times were also fixed at 13:00, 16:00 and 19:00 GMT.

Matchday	Dates	Matches
Matchday 1	3 February 2019	Team 1 vs. Team 4, Team 2 vs. Team 3
Matchday 2	13 February 2019	Team 3 vs. Team 1, Team 4 vs. Team 2
Matchday 3	24 February 2019	Team 4 vs. Team 3, Team 1 vs. Team 2
Matchday 4	3 March 2019	Team 3 vs. Team 4, Team 2 vs. Team 1
Matchday 5	10 March 2019	Team 4 vs. Team 1, Team 3 vs. Team 2
Matchday 6	17 March 2019	Team 1 vs. Team 3, Team 2 vs. Team 4

== Groups ==
=== Group A ===
Pos	Team	Pld	W	D	L	GF	GA	GD	Pts	Qualification	RSB	HAS	RCA	ASO
1	(Morocco) RS Berkane	6	3	2	1	10	5	+5	11	Quarter-finals	—	2–1	0–0	3–0
2	(Morocco) Hassania Agadir	6	2	2	2	5	5	0	8	Quarter-finals	1–0	—	1–1	2–1
3	(Morocco) Raja Casablanca	6	1	4	1	7	6	+1	7		2–4	0–0	—	0–0
4	(Republic of the Congo) AS Otohô	6	1	2	3	4	10	−6	5		1–1	1–0	1–4	—

Source: CAF
Rules for classification: Group stage tiebreakers
3 February 2019
14:00 UTC+1

AS Otohô (Republic of the Congo)	1–1	(Morocco) RS Berkane
Kivutuka 45'	Report	Aziz 89'

Stade Omnisport Marien Ngouabi d'Owando, Owando
Referee: Mahamadou Keita (Mali)
3 February 2019
17:00 UTC+1

Hassania Agadir (Morocco)	1–1	(Morocco) Raja Casablanca
Oubila 63'	Report	Iajour 54'

Stade Adrar, Agadir
Referee: Bienvenu Sinko (Ivory Coast)

13 February 2019
17:00 UTC+1

Raja Casablanca (Morocco)	0–0	(Republic of the Congo) AS Otohô
	Report

Prince Moulay Abdellah Stadium, Rabat
Referee: Sékou Ahmed Touré (Guinea)
13 February 2019
20:00 UTC+1

RS Berkane (Morocco)	2–1	(Morocco) Hassania Agadir
Traoré 45+3'; Dayo 69'	Report	El Mallouki 45+2'

Stade Municipal de Berkane, Berkane
Referee: Hélder Martins de Carvalho (Angola)

24 February 2019
17:00 UTC+1

Raja Casablanca (Morocco)	2–4	(Morocco) RS Berkane
Iajour 60', 78'	Report	Fiddi 10' (o.g.); Laba 52', 84'; Farehane 64'

Prince Moulay Abdellah Stadium, Rabat
Referee: Issa Sy (Senegal)
24 February 2019
20:00 UTC+1

Hassania Agadir (Morocco)	2–1	(Republic of the Congo) AS Otohô
Rami 50', 54'	Report	Botamba 88'

Stade Adrar, Agadir
Referee: Tsegay Mogos Teklu (Eritrea)

3 March 2019
14:00 UTC+1

AS Otohô (Republic of the Congo)	1–0	(Morocco) Hassania Agadir
Biassadila 70'	Report

Stade Omnisport Marien Ngouabi d'Owando, Owando
Referee: Jean Claude Ishimwe (Rwanda)
3 March 2019
20:00 UTC+1

RS Berkane (Morocco)	0–0	(Morocco) Raja Casablanca
	Report

Stade Municipal de Berkane, Berkane
Referee: Antoine Effa (Cameroon)

10 March 2019
17:00 UTC+1

Raja Casablanca (Morocco)	0–0	(Morocco) Hassania Agadir
	Report

Prince Moulay Abdellah Stadium, Rabat
Referee: Youssef Essrayri (Tunisia)
10 March 2019
20:00 UTC+1

RS Berkane (Morocco)	3–0	(Republic of the Congo) AS Otohô
Laba 6'; Ouald El Haj 32'; El Mobarky 50'	Report

Stade Municipal de Berkane, Berkane
Referee: Joshua Bondo (Botswana)

17 March 2019
14:00 UTC+1

Hassania Agadir (Morocco)	1–0	(Morocco) RS Berkane
Alfahli 26'	Report

Stade Adrar, Agadir
Referee: Amin Mohamed Omar (Egypt)
17 March 2019
14:00 UTC+1

AS Otohô (Republic of the Congo)	1–4	(Morocco) Raja Casablanca
Bissiki 16'	Report	Benhalib 41'; Al Ouarfali 44'; Nanah 64'; Iajour 87'

Stade Omnisport Marien Ngouabi d'Owando, Owando
Referee: Bakary Gassama (Gambia)

=== Group B ===
Pos	Team	Pld	W	D	L	GF	GA	GD	Pts	Qualification	CSS	ESS	RAN	SAL
1	(Tunisia) CS Sfaxien	6	3	3	0	5	2	+3	12	Quarter-finals	—	2–1	1–1	0–0
2	(Tunisia) Étoile du Sahel	6	3	1	2	6	4	+2	10	Quarter-finals	0–1	—	2–1	1–0
3	(Nigeria) Enugu Rangers	6	1	2	3	5	7	−2	5		0–1	0–2	—	2–0
4	(Burkina Faso) Salitas	6	0	4	2	1	4	−3	4		0–0	0–0	1–1	—

Source: CAF
Rules for classification: Group stage tiebreakers
3 February 2019
14:00 UTC+1

Enugu Rangers (Nigeria)	2–0	(Burkina Faso) Salitas
Aguda 2'; Louté 60'	Report

Nnamdi Azikiwe Stadium, Enugu
Referee: Bakary Gassama (Gambia)
3 February 2019
17:00 UTC+1

Étoile du Sahel (Tunisia)	0–1	(Tunisia) CS Sfaxien
	Report	Harzi 9'

Stade Olympique de Sousse, Sousse
Referee: Issa Sy (Senegal)

13 February 2019
16:00 UTC+0

Salitas (Burkina Faso)	0–0	(Tunisia) Étoile du Sahel
	Report

Stade du 4 Août, Ouagadougou
Referee: Georges Gatogato (Burundi)
13 February 2019
20:00 UTC+1

CS Sfaxien (Tunisia)	1–1	(Nigeria) Enugu Rangers
Marzouki 71'	Report	Sané 73'

Stade Taïeb Mhiri, Sfax
Referee: Beida Dahane (Mauritania)

24 February 2019
17:00 UTC+1

CS Sfaxien (Tunisia)	0–0	(Burkina Faso) Salitas
	Report

Stade Taïeb Mhiri, Sfax
Referee: Sékou Ahmed Touré (Guinea)
24 February 2019
20:00 UTC+1

Étoile du Sahel (Tunisia)	2–1	(Nigeria) Enugu Rangers
Msakni 35'; Ben Aziza 64'	Report	Silas 15'

Stade Olympique de Sousse, Sousse
Referee: Norman Matemera (Zimbabwe)

3 March 2019
14:00 UTC+1

Enugu Rangers (Nigeria)	0–2	(Tunisia) Étoile du Sahel
	Report	Hannachi 19'; Msakni 69' (pen.)

Nnamdi Azikiwe Stadium, Enugu
Referee: Peter Waweru (Kenya)
3 March 2019
16:00 UTC+0

Salitas (Burkina Faso)	0–0	(Tunisia) CS Sfaxien
	Report

Stade du 4 Août, Ouagadougou
Referee: Souleiman Ahmed Djama (Djibouti)

10 March 2019
17:00 UTC+1

CS Sfaxien (Tunisia)	2–1	(Tunisia) Étoile du Sahel
Chaouat 58'; Hnid 77' (pen.)	Report	Ben Aziza 62'

Stade Taïeb Mhiri, Sfax
Referee: Mustapha Ghorbal (Algeria)
10 March 2019
16:00 UTC+0

Salitas (Burkina Faso)	1–1	(Nigeria) Enugu Rangers
Sawadogo 50'	Report	George 33'

Stade du 4 Août, Ouagadougou
Referee: Noureddine El Jaafari (Morocco)

17 March 2019
14:00 UTC+1

Étoile du Sahel (Tunisia)	1–0	(Burkina Faso) Salitas
Ben Larbi 6'	Report

Stade Olympique de Sousse, Sousse
Referee: Janny Sikazwe (Zambia)
17 March 2019
14:00 UTC+1

Enugu Rangers (Nigeria)	0–1	(Tunisia) CS Sfaxien
	Report	Hnid 73'

Nnamdi Azikiwe Stadium, Enugu
Referee: Hélder Martins de Carvalho (Angola)

=== Group C ===
Pos	Team	Pld	W	D	L	GF	GA	GD	Pts	Qualification	HIL	NKA	ASA	ZES
1	(Sudan) Al-Hilal	6	3	2	1	11	6	+5	11	Quarter-finals	—	4–1	1–0	3–1
2	(Zambia) Nkana	6	3	0	3	9	11	−2	9	Quarter-finals	2–1	—	3–1	3–0
3	(Ghana) Asante Kotoko	6	2	1	3	8	8	0	7 (Note: Goal difference in all group matches: Asante Kotoko 0, ZESCO United –3.)		1–1	3–0	—	2–1
4	(Zambia) ZESCO United	6	2	1	3	7	10	−3	7		1–1	2–0	2–1	—

Source: CAF
Rules for classification: Group stage tiebreakers
Notes:
3 February 2019
18:00 UTC+2

ZESCO United (Zambia)	2–0	(Zambia) Nkana
Ching'andu 28'; Kambole 45+2'	Report

Levy Mwanawasa Stadium, Ndola
Referee: Lahlou Benbraham (Algeria)
3 February 2019
18:00 UTC+2

Al-Hilal (Sudan)	1–0	(Ghana) Asante Kotoko
Al-Shoala 40'	Report

Al-Hilal Stadium, Omdurman
Referee: Mahmoud El Banna (Egypt)

13 February 2019
15:00 UTC+2

Nkana (Zambia)	2–1	(Sudan) Al-Hilal
Tshimenga 14'; Bwalya 75'	Report	Al-Shoala 7'

Nkana Stadium, Kitwe
Referee: Ali Adelaïd (Comoros)
13 February 2019
16:00 UTC+0

Asante Kotoko (Ghana)	2–1	(Zambia) ZESCO United
Bonsu 9'; Gyamfi 25'	Report	Osumanu 73'

Baba Yara Stadium, Kumasi
Referee: Noureddine El Jaafari (Morocco)

24 February 2019
15:00 UTC+2

Nkana (Zambia)	3–1	(Ghana) Asante Kotoko
Tshimenga 21' (pen.); R. Kampamba 26', 53'	Report	Songné 23'

Nkana Stadium, Kitwe
Referee: Ahmed El Ghandour (Egypt)
24 February 2019
18:00 UTC+2

ZESCO United (Zambia)	1–1	(Sudan) Al-Hilal
Kambole 72'	Report	El Shigail 66'

Levy Mwanawasa Stadium, Ndola
Referee: Mohamed Ali Moussa (Niger)

3 March 2019
16:00 UTC+0

Asante Kotoko (Ghana)	3–0	(Zambia) Nkana
Safiu 4'; Gyamfi 23'; Antwi 27'	Report

Baba Yara Stadium, Kumasi
Referee: Gauthier Mihindou (Gabon)
3 March 2019
18:00 UTC+2

Al-Hilal (Sudan)	3–1	(Zambia) ZESCO United
Eldai 10'; Al-Shoala 36'; Boya 66'	Report	Kambole 38'

Al-Hilal Stadium, Omdurman
Referee: Bernard Camille (Seychelles)

10 March 2019
15:00 UTC+2

Nkana (Zambia)	3–0	(Zambia) ZESCO United
K. Kampamba 64'; R. Kampamba 85'; S. Musonda 89'	Report

Nkana Stadium, Kitwe
Referee: Mohamed Adel (Egypt)
10 March 2019
16:00 UTC+0

Asante Kotoko (Ghana)	1–1	(Sudan) Al-Hilal
Songné 86'	Report	Al-Shoala 33'

Baba Yara Stadium, Kumasi
Referee: Bamlak Tessema Weyesa (Ethiopia)

17 March 2019
18:00 UTC+2

ZESCO United (Zambia)	2–1	(Ghana) Asante Kotoko
Were 54'; Mtonga 56'	Report	Nyarko 46'

Levy Mwanawasa Stadium, Ndola
Referee: Victor Gomes (South Africa)
17 March 2019
18:00 UTC+2

Al-Hilal (Sudan)	4–1	(Zambia) Nkana
Shibun 5'; Al-Shoala 19', 61'; Mbombo 77'	Report	Bwalya 48'

Al-Hilal Stadium, Omdurman
Referee: Mustapha Ghorbal (Algeria)

=== Group D ===
Pos	Team	Pld	W	D	L	GF	GA	GD	Pts	Qualification	ZAM	GOR	NAH	PET
1	(Egypt) Zamalek	6	2	3	1	9	6	+3	9 (Note: Head-to-head goal difference: Zamalek +2, Gor Mahia –2.)	Quarter-finals	—	4–0	1–1	1–1
2	(Kenya) Gor Mahia	6	3	0	3	8	9	−1	9	Quarter-finals	4–2	—	2–0	1–0
3	(Algeria) NA Hussein Dey	6	2	2	2	4	6	−2	8		0–0	1–0	—	2–1
4	(Angola) Petro de Luanda	6	2	1	3	6	6	0	7		0–1	2–1	2–0	—

Source: CAF
Rules for classification: Group stage tiebreakers
Notes:
3 February 2019
16:00 UTC+3

Gor Mahia (Kenya)	4–2	(Egypt) Zamalek
Tuyisenge 25', 38'; Kipkirui 51'; Oliech 90'	Report	Hassan 7', 44'

Moi International Sports Centre, Kasarani
Referee: Celso Alvação (Mozambique)
3 February 2019
20:00 UTC+1

NA Hussein Dey (Algeria)	2–1	(Angola) Petro de Luanda
Tougaï 19'; Alati 54'	Report	Vá 76'

Stade du 5 Juillet 1962, Algiers
Referee: El Fadil Mohamed (Sudan)

13 February 2019
17:00 UTC+1

Petro de Luanda (Angola)	2–1	(Kenya) Gor Mahia
Manguxi 13'; Toni 37'	Report	Kipkirui 90+2'

Estádio 11 de Novembro, Luanda
Referee: Tsegay Mogos Teklu (Eritrea)
13 February 2019
21:00 UTC+2

Zamalek (Egypt)	1–1	(Algeria) NA Hussein Dey
Boutaïb 14'	Report	Yaya 90'

Borg El Arab Stadium, Alexandria
Referee: Daniel Laryea (Ghana)

24 February 2019
16:00 UTC+3

Gor Mahia (Kenya)	2–0	(Algeria) NA Hussein Dey
Kahata 84'; Tuyisenge 87'	Report

Moi International Sports Centre, Kasarani
Referee: Abdoul Kanoso (Madagascar)
24 February 2019
21:00 UTC+2

Zamalek (Egypt)	1–1	(Angola) Petro de Luanda
Obama 90+4'	Report	Azulão 60'

Borg El Arab Stadium, Alexandria
Referee: Beida Dahane (Mauritania)

3 March 2019
17:00 UTC+1

Petro de Luanda (Angola)	0–1	(Egypt) Zamalek
	Report	Ahaddad 27'

Estádio 11 de Novembro, Luanda
Referee: Pacifique Ndabihawenimana (Burundi)
3 March 2019
20:00 UTC+1

NA Hussein Dey (Algeria)	1–0	(Kenya) Gor Mahia
Yousfi 9'	Report

Stade du 5 Juillet 1962, Algiers
Referee: Boubou Traoré (Mali)

10 March 2019
14:00 UTC+1

Petro de Luanda (Angola)	2–0	(Algeria) NA Hussein Dey
Job 16'; Azulão 39' (pen.)	Report

Estádio 11 de Novembro, Luanda
Referee: Bernard Camille (Seychelles)
10 March 2019
21:00 UTC+2

Zamalek (Egypt)	4–0	(Kenya) Gor Mahia
Alaa 12'; Obama 26'; Sassi 84'; El Said 86'	Report

Borg El Arab Stadium, Alexandria
Referee: Daniel Laryea (Ghana)

17 March 2019
19:00 UTC+3

Gor Mahia (Kenya)	1–0	(Angola) Petro de Luanda
Tuyisenge 58' (pen.)	Report

Moi International Sports Centre, Kasarani
Referee: Rédouane Jiyed (Morocco)
17 March 2019
17:00 UTC+1

NA Hussein Dey (Algeria)	0–0	(Egypt) Zamalek
	Report

Stade du 5 Juillet 1962, Algiers
Referee: Maguette N'Diaye (Senegal)
