= 2021 CAF Super Cup =

The 2021 CAF Super Cup may refer to either of the following here on Wikipedia:

- 2021 CAF Super Cup (May)
- 2021 CAF Super Cup (December)
