= 2021 CAF Super Cup (May) =

2020 CAF Super Cup
Total CAF Super Cup 2020
Al Ahly	RS Berkane
(Egypt)	(Morocco)
2	0
- Date: 28 May 2021
- Venue: Jassim bin Hamad Stadium, Doha, Qatar
- Man of the Match: Mohamed Sherif (Al Ahly)
- Referee: Mustapha Ghorbal (Algeria)
- Attendance: 2,900
- Weather: Fair; 38 °C (100 °F); 15% humidity

The 2020 CAF Super Cup (officially the Total CAF Super Cup 2020 for sponsorship reasons) was the 29th CAF Super Cup, an annual football match in Africa organized by the Confederation of African Football (CAF), between the winners of the previous season's two CAF club competitions, the CAF Champions League and the CAF Confederation Cup.

The match was played between Al Ahly from Egypt, the 2019–20 CAF Champions League winners, and RS Berkane from Morocco, the 2019–20 CAF Confederation Cup winners, at the Jassim bin Hamad Stadium in Doha, Qatar on 28 May 2021.

The match was originally scheduled to be played on 14, 15 or 16 August 2020, in Qatar for the third season in a row, after they signed a three-year agreement with the CAF two seasons ago. However, the match was delayed due to the postponement of the 2019–20 CAF Champions League and CAF Confederation Cup as a result of the COVID-19 pandemic. On 20 November 2020, the CAF announced that the match would instead be played in Cairo, Egypt, with the date later set to be 10 December 2020. However, RS Berkane refused to play the match at the home country of Al Ahly, and insisted the match be played at a neutral country. The CAF announced on 10 December 2020 that the match would be moved back to Qatar, and to be played in the first half of 2021. It was reported that the match would be played on 17 February 2021, but it was later revealed that a date has not yet been set. The match was later once again rescheduled to be played on 28 May 2021.

Al Ahly won the match 2–0, winning their seventh CAF Super Cup title.

== Teams ==
Team	Zone	Qualification	Previous participation (bold indicates winners)
(Egypt) Al Ahly	UNAF (North Africa)	2019–20 CAF Champions League winners	8 (1994, **2002**, **2006**, **2007**, **2009**, **2013**, **2014**, 2015)
(Morocco) RS Berkane	UNAF (North Africa)	2019–20 CAF Confederation Cup winners	None

== Venue ==
The match was played at Jassim bin Hamad Stadium in Doha, Qatar. The stadium has a capacity of 12,946 and is the home venue of Qatar Stars League side Al Sadd.

It was one of the five venues that hosted the 2011 AFC Asian Cup in the country, and hosted other notable matches before, including the 2014 and 2016 editions of the Supercoppa Italiana. The stadium was also one of the two venues that hosted the 2019 FIFA Club World Cup, hosting all first and second round fixtures.

Due to the COVID-19 pandemic in Qatar, attendance was limited to only 30% of the stadium's seating capacity. Fans who have received two doses of a COVID-19 vaccine only were allowed to enter the stadium.

City	Stadium	Location of the host city of the match.
Doha	Jassim bin Hamad Stadium	Location of the host city of the match.
**Capacity: 15,000**		Location of the host city of the match.

== Format ==
The CAF Super Cup is played as a single match at a neutral venue, with the CAF Champions League winners designated as the "home" team for administrative purposes. If the score is tied at the end of regulation, extra time will not be played, and the penalty shoot-out will be used to determine the winner (CAF Champions League Regulations XXVII and CAF Confederation Cup Regulations XXV).

== Background ==
The match was the third CAF Super Cup to feature an Egyptian and a Moroccan team, with both previous matches ending in favor of the Egyptian side. Al Ahly qualified to the match after defeating fellow Egyptian rivals Zamalek 2–1 in the 2020 CAF Champions League Final. RS Berkane earned a place in the match after defeating Egyptian side Pyramids 1–0 in the 2020 CAF Confederation Cup Final.

This was the first ever meeting between both teams in all competitions.

== Match ==
28 May 2021
16:00 GMT
(19:00 UTC+3)

Al Ahly (Egypt)	2–0	(Morocco) RS Berkane
Sherif 57'; S. Mohsen 82'	Report

Jassim bin Hamad Stadium, Doha (Qatar)
Attendance: 2,900
Referee: Mustapha Ghorbal (Algeria)

**Al Ahly**	**RS Berkane**

GK	1	(Egypt) Mohamed El Shenawy (c)
LB	12	(Egypt) Ayman Ashraf	(yellow card) 5'	(substituted off) 46'
CB	6	(Egypt) Yasser Ibrahim	(yellow card) 21'	(substituted off) 46'
CB	3	(Morocco) Badr Benoun
RB	30	(Egypt) Mohamed Hany	(yellow card) 89'
CM	15	(Mali) Aliou Dieng
CM	17	(Egypt) Amr El Solia
AM	19	(Egypt) Mohamed Magdy
LW	27	(Egypt) Taher Mohamed		(substituted off) 84'
RW	14	(Egypt) Hussein El Shahat	(yellow card) 67'	(substituted off) 67'
CF	10	(Egypt) Mohamed Sherif		(substituted off) 85'
Substitutes:
GK	13	(Egypt) Ali Lotfi
DF	5	(Egypt) Ramy Rabia		(substituted on) 46'
DF	21	(Tunisia) Ali Maâloul	(yellow card) 48'	(substituted on) 46'
MF	8	(Egypt) Hamdy Fathy		(substituted on) 85'
MF	11	(Egypt) Walid Soliman
FW	7	(Egypt) Mahmoud Kahraba	(yellow card) 90+2'	(substituted on) 84'
FW	18	(Egypt) Salah Mohsen		(substituted on) 67'
Manager:
(South Africa) Pitso Mosimane

GK	1	(Morocco) Zouheir Laâroubi
RB	23	(Morocco) Omar Namsaoui
CB	4	(Burkina Faso) Issoufou Dayo	(yellow card) 71'
CB	14	(Morocco) Ismael Mokadem
LB	25	(Morocco) Mohamed Aziz (c)		(substituted off) 66'
CM	8	(Morocco) Larbi Naji		(substituted off) 86'
RM	21	(Morocco) Bakr El Helali		(substituted off) 65'
LM	29	(Morocco) Mohamed Farhane		(substituted off) 78'
AM	10	(Morocco) Zaid Krouch		(substituted off) 77'
CF	7	(Morocco) Hamdi Laachir
CF	9	(Morocco) Mouhcine Iajour
Substitutes:
GK	12	(Morocco) Hamza Hamiani
DF	15	(Morocco) Hamza Regragui
DF	33	(Morocco) Abdelkrim Baadi		(substituted on) 66'
MF	11	(Morocco) Zakaria Hadraf		(substituted on) 65'
MF	17	(Morocco) Amine El Kass		(substituted on) 78'
FW	3	(Morocco) Brahim El Bahraoui		(substituted on) 86'
FW	19	(Burkina Faso) Alain Traoré		(substituted on) 77'
Manager:
(Spain) Juan Pedro Benali

Man of the Match:
Mohamed Sherif (Al Ahly)

Assistant referees:
Abdelhak Etchiali (Algeria)
Mokrane Gourari (Algeria)
Fourth official:
Jean-Jacques Ndala (DR Congo)
Video assistant referee:
Abdulrahman Al Jassim (Qatar)
Assistant video assistant referees:
Khamis Al Marri (Qatar)
Saoud Ahmed (Qatar)

**Match rules**

- 90 minutes.
- Penalty shoot-out if scores level.
- Seven named substitutes, of which up to five may be used. (Note: Each team was only given three opportunities to make substitutions, excluding substitutions made at half-time.)

=== Statistics ===
First half
Statistic	Al Ahly	RS Berkane
Goals scored	0	0
Total shots	1	5
Shots on target	0	0
Saves	0	0
Ball possession	64%	36%
Corner kicks	2	2
Yellow cards	2	0
Red cards	0	0

Second half
Statistic	Al Ahly	RS Berkane
Goals scored	2	0
Total shots	6	7
Shots on target	4	1
Saves	1	2
Ball possession	66%	34%
Corner kicks	2	3
Yellow cards	4	1
Red cards	0	0

Overall
Statistic	Al Ahly	RS Berkane
Goals scored	2	0
Total shots	7	12
Shots on target	4	1
Saves	1	2
Ball possession	65%	35%
Corner kicks	4	5
Yellow cards	6	1
Red cards	0	0

== See also ==
- 2021 CAF Champions League Final
- 2021 CAF Confederation Cup Final
