= Bahaa Magdy =

Egyptian footballer (born 1989)

Personal information
- Full name: Bahaa Magdy younis
- Date of birth: 14 February 1989 (age 37)
- Place of birth: Assiut
- Position: Defender

Team information
- Current team: Al Masry
- Number: 13

Senior career*
Years	Team	Apps	(Gls)
2014	El Qanah	21	(1)
2014–2018	Ismaily	53	(0)
2018–2019	Zamalek	1	(0)
2019–	Al Masry	0	(0)
- * Club domestic league appearances and goals

Bahaa Magdi (born 14 February 1989) is an Egyptian footballer who currently plays for Al Masry in the Egyptian Premier League as a left back.

== Honours ==
Zamalek SC

- Saudi-Egyptian Super Cup: 2018
- CAF Confederation Cup : 2018–19
