= Eugen Moldovan =

Romanian footballer and manager

Personal information
- Date of birth: 5 November 1961 (age 64)
- Place of birth: Braşov, Romania
- Position: Defender

Youth career
- 1969–1979: Tractorul Braşov

Senior career*
Years	Team	Apps	(Gls)
1979–1984	Tractorul Brașov		
1984–1992	FC Brașov	204	(5)
1992–1993	Sagesse Beirut		

Managerial career
- 1994–1996: Metrom Braşov
- 1996–1997: Astra Ploieşti
- 1998–1999: Tractorul Brașov
- 1999–2000: Al-Wehda
- 2000–2001: Sagesse
- 2001: Congo
- 2002–2003: Forex Braşov
- 2003–2004: Al-Seeb
- 2004–2005: Ittihad Khemisset
- 2005–2006: Hassania Agadir
- 2006–2007: CODM Meknès
- 2008–2009: Hassania Agadir
- 2011–2013: Al-Sahel
- 2013–2014: Shabab Al-Ordon Club
- 2015–2016: Racing Beirut
- 2019–2020: Saham Club
- 2024: KSE Târgu Secuiesc
- * Club domestic league appearances and goals

Eugen Moldovan (Arabic: يوجين مولدوفان, born 5 November 1961 in Braşov), also known as Ojine Moldovane in Morocco, is a Romanian football manager who last managed Saham Club in Oman.

He has coached several clubs in the Arabic countries, including Lebanon, Oman, Saudi Arabia, Kuwait, Jordan and Morocco, where he became a favorite at Hassania Agadir. Between 2001 and 2002, he was manager of the Congo national team.

== Honours ==
=== Managerial ===
Sagesse

- Lebanese Premier League runner-up: 2000–01

Al-Seeb

- Sultan Qaboos Cup runner-up: 2003
- Oman Super Cup runner-up: 2004

Hassania Agadir

- Moroccan Cup runner-up: 2005–06
