= Omar Salah (footballer, born 1998) =

Egyptian footballer (born 1998)

Personal information
- Full name: Omar Salah
- Date of birth: January 10, 1998 (age 28)
- Place of birth: Egypt
- Position: Goalkeeper

Team information
- Current team: Petrojet FC

Youth career
- Zamalek SC

Senior career*
Years	Team	Apps	(Gls)
2016–2019	Zamalek SC	5	(0)
2019–23	Smouha	30	(25)
2023–24	Al-Ittihad Alexandria	4	(4)
2024–	Petrojet FC	24	(24)
- * Club domestic league appearances and goals

Omar Salah (Arabic: عمر صلاح) is an Egyptian footballer who plays as a goalkeeper.

== Honours ==
=== Club ===
Zamalek SC

- Egypt Cup: 2017–18
- Saudi-Egyptian Super Cup: 2018
- CAF Confederation Cup : 2018–19

=== Egypt ===
- Africa U-23 Cup of Nations Champions: 2019
