= Ismael Mokadem =

Moroccan footballer (born 1995)

Personal information
- Date of birth: 26 November 1995 (age 30)
- Place of birth: Casablanca, Morocco
- Height: 1.81 m (5 ft 11 in)
- Position: Centre-back

Team information
- Current team: Raja CA
- Number: 4

Youth career
- 2009–2014: Wifaq Bouznika
- 2014–2016: HSB Slimane

Senior career*
Years	Team	Apps	(Gls)
2016–2018	Wydad Temara		
2018–2022	RS Berkane	147	(2)
2022–2024	Raja CA	69	(2)
2024–2025	Al-Ula	26	(0)
2025–	Raja CA	28	(0)

International career^{‡}
2020–	Morocco A'	1	(0)
- * Club domestic league appearances and goals as of 13 September 2026 ‡ National team caps and goals as of 18 April 2024

Ismael Mokadem (Arabic: إسماعيل مقدم; born 26 July 1995) is a Moroccan professional footballer who plays as a centre-back for Botola club Raja CA and the Morocco national team.

== Early life ==
Ismael Mokadem was born on 26 July 1995 in Bouznika. He later joined the youth team of Wifaq Bouznika before moving to the U20 team of Hassania Ben Slimane in 2014.

== Club career ==
=== Debut ===
In 2016, at the age of 21, he made his professional debut with Widad Temara in Botola 2.

At the end of the 2016–2017 season, where he played all the games and became the team captain, he's close to join Fath Union Sports but the move failed.

=== RS Berkane ===
During the summer of 2018, he passed a test with Raja Club Athletic and did not convince the Spaniard coach Juan Carlos Garrido. In August, he signed a four-year contract with RS Berkane. He quickly became a starter under Mounir Jaouani and played the final of the 2018 Throne Cup on 18 November 2018 against Wydad de Fès. After 120 minutes (2-2), he scores during the penalty shoot-out and the Berkanais managed to win their first title.

He participated several times in the Confederation Cup. During the 2018-2019 season, he reached the final of this competition, before losing on penalties against Zamalek SC. He played 16 games in this Cup. The following season, he ended up winning the competition by beating Egyptian club Pyramids FC in the final (1–0). This time around, he takes part in 14 games, with two assists delivered against the Zambian side Zanaco FC.

On 20 May 2022, he won the Confederation Cup for the second time by beating Orlando Pirates FC on penalties (draw, 1-1).

=== Raja CA ===
On 15 July 2022, he finally joined Raja CA as a free agent and signed a three-year contract. On 19 October, he made his debut with the Eagles against Hassania Agadir alongside Marouane Hadhoudi in the defense.

=== One year at Al-Ula and return to Raja ===
On 26 August 2024, Mokadem joined Saudi Second Division League club Al-Ula. The club finished in the top of group A and thus secured promotion. On 14 April 2025, Mokadem started when Al-Ula faced Al-Diriyah, the winners of Group B. Al-Diriyah defeated Al-Ula 1–0 to win their second title and first since 2013.

On 21 August 2025, Raja cut short the plans of Wydad AC and RS Berkane, who wanted to recruit him, and signed him for two seasons.

== International career ==
On 21 September 2019, he received his first selection with the Morocco A' team, against Algeria, under Hussein Ammouta.

== Honours ==
Raja CA

- Botola Pro: 2023–24
- Moroccan Throne Cup: 2022–23

RS Berkane

- Moroccan Throne Cup: 2018
- CAF Confederation Cup: 2020, 2022; runner-up: 2021
- CAF Super Cup runner-up: 2021

Al-Ula

- Saudi Second Division League; runner-up: 2024–25
