= Stade Omnisport Marien Ngouabi d'Owando =

Stadium in Owando, Republic of the Congo

- Stade Omnisport Marien Ngouabi d'Owando
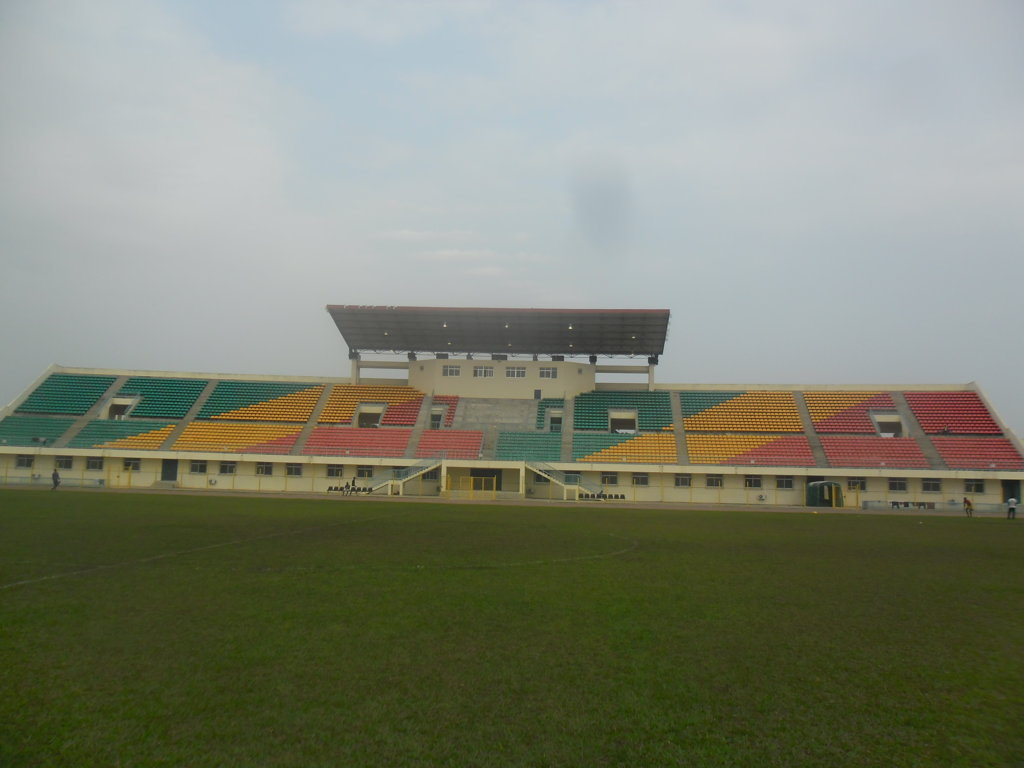
- Interactive map of Stade Omnisport Marien Ngouabi d'Owando
- Full name: Stade Omnisport Marien Ngouabi d'Owando
- Location: Owando, Republic of the Congo
- Coordinates: 0.4856°S 15.8832°E
- Capacity: 13,037
- Surface: grass

Construction
- Opened: 2009

Tenant
- AC Léopard

Stade Omnisport Marien Ngouabi d'Owando is a multi-use stadium in Owando, Republic of the Congo. It is used for football matches and serves as the home of AC Léopard of the Congo Premier League. It holds 13,037 people and opened in 2009.
