= 2018 Elite One =

Elite One
- Season: 2018
- Champions: Coton Sport FC de Garoua

The 2018 Elite One was the 58th season of the Cameroon top-tier football league. The season began on 11 February and ended on 29 July 2018.

== Final table ==
Pos	Team	Pld	W	D	L	GF	GA	GD	Pts	Qualification or relegation
1	Coton Sport FC	34	19	12	3	59	24	+35	69	Champions
2	UMS de Loum	34	14	13	7	25	16	+9	55	
3	Bamboutos FC	34	14	11	9	32	21	+11	53	
4	New Star FC CNIC UIC	34	14	7	13	29	31	−2	49	
5	Fovu Club	34	13	9	12	30	32	−2	48	
6	Yong Sports Academy	34	10	17	7	20	15	+5	47	
7	Union Sportive	34	11	13	10	35	34	+1	46	
8	Eding Sport FC de la Lékié	34	11	13	10	37	35	+2	46	
9	Colombe Sportive du Dja et Lobo	34	10	15	9	29	25	+4	45	
10	Feutcheu FC	34	11	12	11	33	39	−6	45	
11	Dragon FC	34	11	11	12	42	45	−3	44	
12	APEJES Football Academy	34	11	11	12	43	42	+1	44	
13	Stade Renard de Melong	34	10	12	12	27	29	−2	42	
14	AS Fortuna	34	11	9	14	36	41	−5	42	
15	Les Astres FC	34	10	12	12	31	29	+2	42	
16	Unisport FC du Haut Nkam	34	9	13	12	24	29	−5	40	Relegated
17	AS Aigle Royal de la Menoua	34	8	8	18	26	42	−16	32	Relegated
18	Yaoundé II FC	34	6	8	20	17	46	−29	26	Relegated
