= 2018 Djibouti Cup =

Tournament details
- Country: Djibouti

Final positions
- Champions: Djibouti Télécom

The 2018 Coupe de Djibouti (Coupe du 27 Juin) is the 2018 edition of the Coupe de Djibouti, the knockout football competition of Djibouti.

== Preliminary round ==
[Jan 15]

Wea 4-1 Hadji-Dideh

CDC Quartier 6 1-3 SDVK 2

UJ Q4 4-2 UDC/Arhiba

CDC Q5 0-3 Institute Saoudi

== Round of 32 ==
[Jan 19]

FC Dikhil 3-1 Doraleh

AS Barwaqo 3-1 UJ Q4

[Jan 20]

AS Tadjourah 11-2 Damerjog

Arhiba 4-1 Ets Abdi

AS Jeunes Jago/Mairie de Djibouti 2-0 Jamal

CDC Einguella 3-2 Lycée de Balbala

[Jan 22]

AS Ali Sabieh/Djibouti Télécom 4-2 SDC Group/Hôpital de Balbala

Arta/Solar7 11-1 SDVK I

[Jan 26]

Guelleh Batal/SID 7-6 Institute Saoudi

Cité Stade 3-1 Obock

Gendarmerie Nationale 9-1 Wea

EAD 3-1 SDVK 2

[Jan 27]

Bahache/Université de Djibouti 7-0 CDC Quartier 7

Hayableh 2-1 Pharmacie Hikma

AS Port 7-1 Cité Gargar

AS Kartileh 2/UCIG 3-1 Kartileh 1

== Round of 16 ==
[Feb 3]

AS Jeunes Jago/Mairie de Djibouti 1-4 EAD

Guelleh Batal/SID 5-1 AS Tadjourah

Hayableh 2-0 CDC Einguella

Arta/Solar7 5-4 AS Port

[Feb 5]

Gendarmerie Nationale 2-1 AS Kartileh 2/UCIG

Cité Stade 0-4 AS Ali Sabieh/Djibouti Télécom

AS Barwaqo 1-3 Bahache/Université de Djibouti

Arhiba 1-3 FC Dikhil

== Quarterfinals ==
[Feb 9]

Hayableh lt Bahache/Université de Djibouti

FC Dikhil 1-2 AS Ali Sabieh/Djibouti Télécom

[Feb 10]

Guelleh Batal/SID bt EAD

[Feb 16]

Gendarmerie Nationale lt Arta/Solar7

== Semifinals ==
[Feb 16]

Guelleh Batal/SID lt Bahache/Université de Djibouti

[Feb 26]

AS Ali Sabieh/Djibouti Télécom 3-0 Arta/Solar7

== Final ==
[Sep 22]

AS Ali Sabieh/Djibouti Télécom 1-0 Bahache/Université de Djibouti

== See also ==
- 2017–18 Djibouti Premier League
