= Hassania Sportive Ben Slimane =

Moroccan football club

- Full name: Hassania Sportive Ben Slimane
- Founded: 1958
- Ground: Stade Municipal
- Capacity: unknown
- League: GNFA 1 Nord
Home colours	Away colours

Hassania Sportive Ben Slimane, also called HSB Slimane is a Moroccan football club currently playing in the third division.
