= 2018–19 CAF Confederation Cup =

International football competition in Africa

2018–19 Total CAF Confederation Cup

Tournament details
- Dates: 27 November 2018 – 26 May 2019
- Teams: 55+15 (from 45 associations)

Final positions
- Champions: (Egypt) Zamalek (1st title)
- Runners-up: (Morocco) RS Berkane

Tournament statistics
- Matches played: 167
- Goals scored: 376 (2.25 per match)
- Top scorer: (Sudan) Waleed Al-Shoala (7 goals)

The 2018–19 CAF Confederation Cup (officially the 2018–19 Total CAF Confederation Cup for sponsorship reasons) was the 16th edition of Africa's secondary club football tournament organized by the Confederation of African Football (CAF), under the current CAF Confederation Cup title after the merger of CAF Cup and African Cup Winners' Cup.

This season follows a transitional calendar which allows the CAF club competitions to switch from a February-to-November schedule to an August–to-May schedule, as per the decision of the CAF Executive Committee on 20 July 2017. It started in December 2018, right after the 2018 season has finished, and concluded in May 2019, before the 2019 Africa Cup of Nations (which has been switched from January/February to June/July).

Zamalek won the title for the first time, defeating RS Berkane in the final 5–3 on penalties after being tied 1–1 on aggregate, and earned the right to play against the winners of the 2018–19 CAF Champions League in the 2020 CAF Super Cup.

Raja Casablanca were the defending champions, but were eliminated in the group stage.

== Association team allocation ==
All 56 CAF member associations may enter the CAF Confederation Cup, with the 12 highest ranked associations according to their CAF 5-year ranking eligible to enter two teams in the competition. As a result, theoretically a maximum of 68 teams could enter the tournament (plus 16 teams eliminated from the CAF Champions League which enter the play-off round) – although this level has never been reached.

For the 2018–19 CAF Confederation Cup, the CAF uses the 2013–2017 CAF 5-year ranking, which calculates points for each entrant association based on their clubs' performance over those 5 years in the CAF Champions League and CAF Confederation Cup. The criteria for points are the following:

	CAF Champions League	CAF Confederation Cup
Winners	6 points	5 points
Runners-up	5 points	4 points
Losing semi-finalists	4 points	3 points
Losing quarter-finalists (from 2017)	3 points	2 points
3rd place in groups	2 points	1 point
4th place in groups	1 point	0.5 point

The points are multiplied by a coefficient according to the year as follows:

- 2017 – 5
- 2016 – 4
- 2015 – 3
- 2014 – 2
- 2013 – 1

== Teams ==
The following 55 teams from 43 associations entered the competition.

- Nine teams (in **bold**) received a bye to the first round.
- The other 46 teams entered the preliminary round.

Associations are shown according to their 2013–2017 CAF 5-year ranking – those with a ranking score have their rank and score indicated.

Associations eligible to enter two teams (Ranked 1–12)
Association	Team	Qualifying method
Tunisia (1st – 116 pts)	**Étoile du Sahel**	2017–18 Tunisian Ligue Professionnelle 1 third place
Tunisia (1st – 116 pts)	**CS Sfaxien**	2017–18 Tunisian Ligue Professionnelle 1 fourth place
Egypt (2nd – 106.5 pts)	**Al-Masry**	2017–18 Egyptian Premier League third place
Egypt (2nd – 106.5 pts)	**Zamalek**	2017–18 Egypt Cup winners
DR Congo (3rd – 90 pts)	DC Motema Pembe	2017–18 Linafoot third place
DR Congo (3rd – 90 pts)	AS Nyuki	2018 Coupe du Congo DR winners
Morocco (4th – 84 pts)	Hassania Agadir	2017–18 Botola third place
Morocco (4th – 84 pts)	**RS Berkane**	2018 Moroccan Throne Cup winners
Morocco (4th – 84 pts)	**Raja Casablanca**	Title holders (2018 CAF Confederation Cup winners)
Algeria (5th – 82.5 pts)	NA Hussein Dey	2017–18 Algerian Ligue Professionnelle 1 third place
Algeria (5th – 82.5 pts)	USM Bel Abbès	2017–18 Algerian Cup winners
South Africa (6th – 78.5 pts)	Kaizer Chiefs	2017–18 South African Premier Division third place
South Africa (6th – 78.5 pts)	Free State Stars	2017–18 Nedbank Cup winners
Sudan (7th – 53 pts)	**El-Hilal El-Obeid**	2018 Sudan Premier League third place
Sudan (7th – 53 pts)	Al-Ahly Shendi	2018 Sudan Premier League fourth place
Zambia (8th – 38 pts)	Green Buffaloes	2018 Zambia Super League third place
Zambia (8th – 38 pts)	Green Eagles	2018 Zambia Super League fourth place
Libya (9th – 19 pts)	**Al-Ahli Tripoli**	2017–18 Libyan Premier League third place
Libya (9th – 19 pts)	Al-Ittihad	2018 Libyan Cup winners
Cameroon (T-10th – 15 pts)	New Star	2018 Elite One fourth place
Cameroon (T-10th – 15 pts)	Eding Sport	2018 Cameroonian Cup finalists
Ivory Coast (T-10th – 15 pts)	FC San Pédro	2017–18 Côte d'Ivoire Ligue 1 third place
Ivory Coast (T-10th – 15 pts)	Stade d'Abidjan	2018 Coupe de Côte d'Ivoire runners-up

Associations eligible to enter one team
Association	Team	Qualifying method
Ethiopia (T-13th – 10.5 pts)	Defence Force	2018 Ethiopian Cup winners
Nigeria (T-13th – 10.5 pts)	Enugu Rangers	2018 Nigeria Federation Cup winners
Congo (15th – 10 pts)	Diables Noirs	2018 Coupe du Congo winners
Mali (16th – 8 pts)	Djoliba	2018 Malian Cup runners-up
Angola (17th – 6 pts)	Petro de Luanda	2018 Girabola runners-up
Guinea (T-18th – 5 pts)	Wakriya	2018 Guinée Coupe Nationale runners-up
Eswatini (T-18th – 5 pts)	Young Buffaloes	2018 Swazi Cup winners
Uganda (T-18th – 5 pts)	**KCCA**	2018 Uganda Cup winners
Ghana (22nd – 4 pts)	Asante Kotoko	2017 Ghanaian FA Cup winners
Gabon (23rd – 2.5 pts)	Cercle Mbéri Sportif	2018 Gabon Championnat National D1 runners-up
Tanzania (24th – 2 pts)	Mtibwa Sugar	2017–18 Tanzania FA Cup winners
Botswana	Orapa United	2017–18 Mascom Top 8 Cup runners-up
Burkina Faso	Salitas	2018 Coupe du Faso winners
Burundi	Vital'O	2018 Burundian Cup winners
Central African Republic	Anges de Fatima	2018 Central African Republic League runners-up
Chad	AS CotonTchad	2018 Chad Premier League runners-up
Comoros	Miracle Club	2018 Comoros Cup winners
Djibouti	Arta/Solar7	2018 Djibouti Cup losing semi-finalists
Equatorial Guinea	Deportivo Unidad	2018 Equatoguinean Primera División runners-up
Gambia	Armed Forces	2018 Gambian Cup winners
Kenya	Kariobangi Sharks	2018 FKF President's Cup winners
Liberia	LISCR	2018 Liberian FA Cup runners-up
Madagascar	ASSM Elgeco Plus	2018 Coupe de Madagascar winners
Malawi	Silver Strikers	2017 Malawi Premier Division third place
Mauritania	Nouakchott King's	2018 Coupe du Président de la République runners-up
Niger	AS GNN	2018 Niger Cup winners
Rwanda	Mukura Victory Sports	2018 Rwandan Cup winners
Senegal	Génération Foot	2018 Senegal FA Cup winners
Seychelles	Northern Dynamo	2017 Seychelles League Cup winners
South Sudan	Al-Merreikh Juba	2018 South Sudan National Cup winners
Togo	Gomido	2018 Coupe du Togo winners
Zanzibar	Zimamoto	2017–18 Zanzibar Premier League runners-up

A further 15 teams (one fewer than usual) eliminated from the 2018–19 CAF Champions League enter the play-off round.

Losers of 2018–19 CAF Champions League first round
(Senegal) ASC Diaraf	(Morocco) Ittihad Tanger	(Cameroon) Coton Sport	(Zambia) ZESCO United	(Namibia) African Stars
(Libya) Al-Ahly Benghazi	(Kenya) Gor Mahia	(Zambia) Nkana	(Ethiopia) Jimma Aba Jifar	(Uganda) Vipers
(Mali) Stade Malien	(Lesotho) Bantu	(Sudan) Al-Hilal	(Libya) Al-Nasr	(Republic of the Congo) AS Otohô

Notes

1. Title holders (TH): Usually, the association of the title holders is not allowed to enter more than the eligible number of teams according to the CAF 5-year ranking (Regulations IV. 5). However, due to the transitional calendar where the 2018–19 CAF Confederation Cup began before the 2018 CAF Confederation Cup Final, the identity of the title holders was not known at the time of the draw. As a result, it was decided that the association of the title holders would be allowed exceptionally to enter a third team for this season. As Raja Casablanca won the 2018 CAF Confederation Cup, they entered the competition and received a bye to the first round.
2. Cameroon (CMR):
  - Cameroon were represented by New Star, the 2018 Elite One fourth place, as Bamboutos, the 2018 Elite One third place, were relegated following the 2018 season due to a FIFA ruling.
  - Cameroon were also to be represented by Eding Sport, one of the 2018 Cameroonian Cup finalists, as the final was not played in time for the 2018–19 CAF competitions. However, the Cameroonian Football Federation was not able to confirm the engagement of Eding Sport by the CAF deadline.
3. Ghana (GHA): Ghana were represented by Asante Kotoko, the 2017 Ghanaian FA Cup winners, as the 2018 Ghanaian FA Cup was suspended.
4. Malawi (MWI): Malawi were represented by Silver Strikers, the 2017 Malawi Premier Division third place, as the 2018 Malawi FAM Cup was not finished in time for the 2018–19 CAF competitions (Kamuzu Barracks, the 2017 Malawi FAM Cup winners, chose not to enter).
5. Seychelles (SEY): Seychelles were represented by Northern Dynamo, the 2017 Seychelles League Cup winners, as the 2018 Seychelles FA Cup was not finished in time for the 2018–19 CAF competitions.

Associations which did not enter a team

- Benin
- Cape Verde
- Eritrea
- Guinea-Bissau
- Mauritius
- Mozambique (T-10th – 15 pts; eligible for two entrants)
- Réunion
- São Tomé and Príncipe
- Sierra Leone (suspended by FIFA)
- Somalia
- Zimbabwe (T-18th – 5 pts)

Associations which did not enter a team initially, but had a team transferred from Champions League

- Lesotho
- Namibia
Location of teams of the 2018–19 CAF Confederation Cup.
Italics: Teams transferred from the 2018–19 CAF Champions League.
Red: Preliminary round; Green: First Round; Purple: Play-off Round;
Brown: Group A; Orange: Group B; Yellow: Group C; Blue: Group D.

== Schedule ==
The schedule of the competition is as follows (matches scheduled in midweek in italics). Effective from the Confederation Cup group stage, weekend matches are played on Sundays while midweek matches are played on Wednesdays, with some exceptions. Kick-off times are also fixed at 13:00, 16:00 and 19:00 GMT.

Phase	Round	Draw date	First leg	Second leg
Qualifying	Preliminary round	3 November 2018 (Rabat, Morocco)	27–28 November 2018	4–5 December 2018
Qualifying	First round	3 November 2018 (Rabat, Morocco)	14–16 December 2018	21–23 December 2018
Qualifying	Play-off round	28 December 2018 (Cairo, Egypt)	11–13 January 2019	18–20 January 2019
Group stage	Matchday 1	21 January 2019 (Cairo, Egypt)	3 February 2019	
Group stage	Matchday 2	21 January 2019 (Cairo, Egypt)	13 February 2019	
Group stage	Matchday 3	21 January 2019 (Cairo, Egypt)	24 February 2019	
Group stage	Matchday 4	21 January 2019 (Cairo, Egypt)	3 March 2019	
Group stage	Matchday 5	21 January 2019 (Cairo, Egypt)	10 March 2019	
Group stage	Matchday 6	21 January 2019 (Cairo, Egypt)	17 March 2019	
Knockout stage	Quarter-finals	20 March 2019 (Cairo, Egypt)	7 April 2019	14 April 2019
Knockout stage	Semi-finals	20 March 2019 (Cairo, Egypt)	28 April 2019	5 May 2019
Knockout stage	Final	20 March 2019 (Cairo, Egypt)	19 May 2019	26 May 2019

== Qualifying rounds ==
The draw for the preliminary round and first round was held on 3 November 2018 in Rabat, Morocco, and was officially announced by the CAF on 9 November due to a special situation with the transitional calendar. In the qualifying rounds, each tie was played on a home-and-away two-legged basis. If the aggregate score was tied after the second leg, the away goals rule would be applied, and if still tied, extra time would not be played, and the penalty shoot-out would be used to determine the winner (Regulations III. 13 & 14).

=== Preliminary round ===
Team 1	Agg.	Team 2	1st leg	2nd leg
Nouakchott King's (Mauritania)	2–2 (a)	(Ivory Coast) **Stade d'Abidjan**	1–2	1–0
Al-Ahly Shendi (Sudan)	1–1 (1–3 p)	(Democratic Republic of the Congo) **AS Nyuki**	1–0	0–1
**Petro de Luanda** (Angola)	6–0	(Botswana) Orapa United	4–0	2–0
**AS CotonTchad** (Chad)	3–1	(Togo) Gomido	2–0	1–1
**Hassania Agadir** (Morocco)	4–0	(Niger) AS GNN	4–0	0–0
**Génération Foot** (Senegal)	1–0	(Mali) Djoliba	0–0	1–0
**USM Bel Abbès** (Algeria)	4–1	(Liberia) LISCR	4–0	0–1
**Enugu Rangers** (Nigeria)	5–1	(Ethiopia) Defence Force	2–0	3–1
**Salitas** (Burkina Faso)	3–3 (a)	(Guinea) Wakriya	2–0	1–3
**Mtibwa Sugar** (Tanzania)	5–0	(Seychelles) Northern Dynamo	4–0	1–0
**DC Motema Pembe** (Democratic Republic of the Congo)	5–2	(Central African Republic) Anges de Fatima	4–1	1–1
**FC San Pédro** (Ivory Coast)	2–1	(The Gambia) Armed Forces	1–1	1–0
**Cercle Mbéri Sportif** (Gabon)	1–1 (4–3 p)	(Malawi) Silver Strikers	1–0	0–1
**Kaizer Chiefs** (South Africa)	5–2	(Zanzibar) Zimamoto	4–0	1–2
**ASSM Elgeco Plus** (Madagascar)	4–3	(Equatorial Guinea) Deportivo Unidad	3–1	1–2
Miracle Club (Comoros)	w/o (Note: Al-Ittihad won on walkover after Miracle Club withdrew prior to the second leg.)	(Libya) **Al-Ittihad**	0–8	—
**New Star** (Cameroon)	4–1	(Burundi) Vital'O	0–0	4–1
**Kariobangi Sharks** (Kenya)	9–1	(Djibouti) Arta/Solar7	6–1	3–0
**Asante Kotoko** (Ghana)	w/o (Note: Asante Kotoko won on walkover after FECAFOOT was not able to confirm the engagement of their second representative by the CAF deadline.)	(Cameroon) Eding Sport	—	—
Free State Stars (South Africa)	0–1	(Rwanda) **Mukura Victory Sports**	0–0	0–1
**Green Eagles** (Zambia)	5–2	(Eswatini) Young Buffaloes	2–0	3–2
**NA Hussein Dey** (Algeria)	3–1	(Republic of the Congo) Diables Noirs	2–0	1–1
**Green Buffaloes** (Zambia)	2–0	(South Sudan) Al-Merreikh Juba	2–0	0–0

=== First round ===
As there were 16 winners of the Confederation Cup first round, but only 15 losers of the Champions League first round for this season, the winners of the first round with the best CAF 5-year ranking (in bold italics) advanced directly to the group stage. The remaining 15 winners of the first round advanced to the play-off round, where they were joined by the 15 losers of the Champions League first round.

Team 1	Agg.	Team 2	1st leg	2nd leg
**Étoile du Sahel** (Tunisia)	3–1	(Ivory Coast) Stade d'Abidjan	3–0	0–1
AS Nyuki (Democratic Republic of the Congo)	0–2	(Angola) **Petro de Luanda**	0–1	0–1
**Zamalek** (Egypt)	7–2	(Chad) AS CotonTchad	7–0	0–2
**Hassania Agadir** (Morocco)	2–1	(Senegal) Génération Foot	2–0	0–1
USM Bel Abbès (Algeria)	0–2	(Nigeria) **Enugu Rangers**	0–0	0–2
Al-Masry (Egypt)	0–2	(Burkina Faso) **Salitas**	0–2	0–0
**KCCA** (Uganda)	5–1	(Tanzania) Mtibwa Sugar	3–0	2–1
DC Motema Pembe (Democratic Republic of the Congo)	1–3	(Ivory Coast) **FC San Pédro**	1–1	0–2
**Raja Casablanca** (Morocco)	5–1	(Gabon) Cercle Mbéri Sportif	5–0	0–1
**Kaizer Chiefs** (South Africa)	6–0	(Madagascar) ASSM Elgeco Plus	3–0	3–0
**RS Berkane** (Morocco)	4–0	(Libya) Al-Ittihad	3–0	1–0
Al-Ahli Tripoli (Libya)	1–1 (a)	(Cameroon) **New Star**	1–1	0–0
Kariobangi Sharks (Kenya)	1–2	(Ghana) **Asante Kotoko**	0–0	1–2
El-Hilal El-Obeid (Sudan)	0–0 (4–5 p)	(Rwanda) **Mukura Victory Sports**	0–0	0–0
Green Eagles (Zambia)	1–2	(Algeria) **NA Hussein Dey**	0–0	1–2
**CS Sfaxien** (Tunisia)	4–2	(Zambia) Green Buffaloes	4–1	0–1

=== Play-off round ===
The draw for the play-off round was held on 28 December 2018, 18:00 CAT (UTC+2), at the Nile Ritz-Carlton in Cairo, Egypt. The winners of the Confederation Cup first round were drawn against the losers of the Champions League first round, with the teams from the Confederation Cup hosting the second leg. The 15 winners of the play-off round advanced to the group stage to join Étoile du Sahel, who advanced directly to the group stage as the winners of the first round with the best CAF 5-year ranking.

Team 1	Agg.	Team 2	1st leg	2nd leg
**Gor Mahia** (Kenya)	2–1	(Cameroon) New Star	2–1	0–0
Al-Ahly Benghazi (Libya)	2–3	(Algeria) **NA Hussein Dey**	1–0	1–3
**Al-Hilal** (Sudan)	3–1	(Rwanda) Mukura Victory Sports	3–0	0–1
**Nkana** (Zambia)	3–0	(Ivory Coast) FC San Pédro	3–0	0–0
Coton Sport (Cameroon)	3–5	(Ghana) **Asante Kotoko**	2–3	1–2
**ZESCO United** (Zambia)	5–2	(South Africa) Kaizer Chiefs	3–1	2–1
Stade Malien (Mali)	2–3	(Angola) **Petro de Luanda**	1–1	1–2
African Stars (Namibia)	1–2	(Morocco) **Raja Casablanca**	1–1	0–1
ASC Diaraf (Senegal)	3–5	(Morocco) **RS Berkane**	2–0	1–5
Vipers (Uganda)	0–3	(Tunisia) **CS Sfaxien**	0–0	0–3
Ittihad Tanger (Morocco)	1–3	(Egypt) **Zamalek**	0–0	1–3
**AS Otôho** (Republic of the Congo)	3–2	(Uganda) KCCA	3–0	0–2
Bantu (Lesotho)	2–4	(Nigeria) **Enugu Rangers**	1–2	1–2
Al-Nasr (Libya)	2–3	(Burkina Faso) **Salitas**	1–0	1–3
Jimma Aba Jifar (Ethiopia)	0–5	(Morocco) **Hassania Agadir**	0–1	0–4

== Group stage ==
The draw for the group stage was held on 21 January 2019, 12:00 CAT (UTC+2), at the CAF headquarters in Cairo, Egypt. The 16 teams, including the winners of the first round with the best CAF 5-year ranking, Étoile du Sahel, and the 15 winners of the play-off round of qualifying, were drawn into four groups of four.

The teams were seeded by their performances in the CAF competitions for the previous five seasons (CAF 5-year ranking points shown in parentheses). Each group contained one team from each of Pot 1 and Pot 2, and two teams from Pot 3, and each team was drawn into one of the positions in their group.

Pot	Pot 1	Pot 2	Pot 3
Teams	(Tunisia) Étoile du Sahel (50.5 pts); (Egypt) Zamalek (30 pts); (Zambia) ZESCO United (30 pts); (Morocco) Raja Casablanca (25 pts)	(Sudan) Al-Hilal (16.5 pts); (Tunisia) CS Sfaxien (13 pts); (Morocco) RS Berkane (10 pts); (Kenya) Gor Mahia (5 pts)	(Zambia) Nkana (1 pt); (Algeria) NA Hussein Dey; (Angola) Petro de Luanda; (Burkina Faso) Salitas; (Republic of the Congo) AS Otohô; (Ghana) Asante Kotoko; (Morocco) Hassania Agadir; (Nigeria) Enugu Rangers

In the group stage, each group was played on a home-and-away round-robin basis. The winners and runners-up of each group advanced to the quarter-finals of the knockout stage.

Tiebreakers
The teams were ranked according to points (3 points for a win, 1 point for a draw, 0 points for a loss). If tied on points, tiebreakers were applied in the following order (Regulations III. 20 & 21):
1. Points in head-to-head matches among tied teams;
2. Goal difference in head-to-head matches among tied teams;
3. Goals scored in head-to-head matches among tied teams;
4. Away goals scored in head-to-head matches among tied teams;
5. If more than two teams are tied, and after applying all head-to-head criteria above, a subset of teams are still tied, all head-to-head criteria above are reapplied exclusively to this subset of teams;
6. Goal difference in all group matches;
7. Goals scored in all group matches;
8. Away goals scored in all group matches;
9. Drawing of lots.

=== Group A ===
Pos	Team	Pld	W	D	L	GF	GA	GD	Pts	Qualification	RSB	HAS	RCA	ASO
1	(Morocco) RS Berkane	6	3	2	1	10	5	+5	11	Quarter-finals	—	2–1	0–0	3–0
2	(Morocco) Hassania Agadir	6	2	2	2	5	5	0	8	Quarter-finals	1–0	—	1–1	2–1
3	(Morocco) Raja Casablanca	6	1	4	1	7	6	+1	7		2–4	0–0	—	0–0
4	(Republic of the Congo) AS Otohô	6	1	2	3	4	10	−6	5		1–1	1–0	1–4	—

Source: CAF

=== Group B ===
Pos	Team	Pld	W	D	L	GF	GA	GD	Pts	Qualification	CSS	ESS	RAN	SAL
1	(Tunisia) CS Sfaxien	6	3	3	0	5	2	+3	12	Quarter-finals	—	2–1	1–1	0–0
2	(Tunisia) Étoile du Sahel	6	3	1	2	6	4	+2	10	Quarter-finals	0–1	—	2–1	1–0
3	(Nigeria) Enugu Rangers	6	1	2	3	5	7	−2	5		0–1	0–2	—	2–0
4	(Burkina Faso) Salitas	6	0	4	2	1	4	−3	4		0–0	0–0	1–1	—

Source: CAF

=== Group C ===
Pos	Team	Pld	W	D	L	GF	GA	GD	Pts	Qualification	HIL	NKA	ASA	ZES
1	(Sudan) Al-Hilal	6	3	2	1	11	6	+5	11	Quarter-finals	—	4–1	1–0	3–1
2	(Zambia) Nkana	6	3	0	3	9	11	−2	9	Quarter-finals	2–1	—	3–1	3–0
3	(Ghana) Asante Kotoko	6	2	1	3	8	8	0	7 (Note: Goal difference in all group matches: Asante Kotoko 0, ZESCO United –3.)		1–1	3–0	—	2–1
4	(Zambia) ZESCO United	6	2	1	3	7	10	−3	7		1–1	2–0	2–1	—

Source: CAF

=== Group D ===
Pos	Team	Pld	W	D	L	GF	GA	GD	Pts	Qualification	ZAM	GOR	NAH	PET
1	(Egypt) Zamalek	6	2	3	1	9	6	+3	9 (Note: Head-to-head goal difference: Zamalek +2, Gor Mahia –2.)	Quarter-finals	—	4–0	1–1	1–1
2	(Kenya) Gor Mahia	6	3	0	3	8	9	−1	9	Quarter-finals	4–2	—	2–0	1–0
3	(Algeria) NA Hussein Dey	6	2	2	2	4	6	−2	8		0–0	1–0	—	2–1
4	(Angola) Petro de Luanda	6	2	1	3	6	6	0	7		0–1	2–1	2–0	—

Source: CAF

== Knockout stage ==
In the knockout stage, the eight teams play a single-elimination tournament. Each tie is played on a home-and-away two-legged basis. If the aggregate score is tied after the second leg, the away goals rule will be applied, and if still tied, extra time will not be played, and the penalty shoot-out will be used to determine the winner (Regulations III. 26 & 27).

=== Bracket ===
The bracket was decided after the draw for the knockout stage (quarter-finals and semi-finals), which was held on 20 March 2019, 19:00 CAT (UTC+2), at the Marriot Hotel in Cairo, Egypt.

Quarter-finals
(Zambia) Nkana	2	0	2
(Tunisia) CS Sfaxien	1	2	3
(Kenya) Gor Mahia	0	1	1
(Morocco) RS Berkane	2	5	7
(Morocco) Hassania Agadir	0	0	0
(Egypt) Zamalek	0	1	1
(Tunisia) Étoile du Sahel	3	2	5
(Sudan) Al-Hilal	1	1	2

Semi-finals
(Tunisia) CS Sfaxien	2	0	2
(Morocco) RS Berkane	0	3	3
(Egypt) Zamalek	1	0	1
(Tunisia) Étoile du Sahel	0	0	0

Final
(Morocco) RS Berkane	1	0	1 (3)
(Egypt) Zamalek (p)	0	1	1 (5)

=== Quarter-finals ===
In the quarter-finals, the winners of one group played the runners-up of another group (teams from same group could not play each other), with the group winners hosting the second leg, and the matchups decided by draw.

Team 1	Agg.	Team 2	1st leg	2nd leg
Nkana (Zambia)	2–3	(Tunisia) CS Sfaxien	2–1	0–2
Étoile du Sahel (Tunisia)	5–2	(Sudan) Al-Hilal	3–1	2–1
Hassania Agadir (Morocco)	0–1	(Egypt) Zamalek	0–0	0–1
Gor Mahia (Kenya)	1–7	(Morocco) RS Berkane	0–2	1–5

=== Semi-finals ===
In the semi-finals, the four quarter-final winners played in two ties, with the matchups and order of legs decided by draw.

Team 1	Agg.	Team 2	1st leg	2nd leg
CS Sfaxien (Tunisia)	2–3	(Morocco) RS Berkane	2–0	0–3
Zamalek (Egypt)	1–0	(Tunisia) Étoile du Sahel	1–0	0–0

=== Final ===
In the final, the two semi-final winners play each other, with the order of legs determined by the semi-final draw.

19 May 2019
22:00 UTC+0

RS Berkane (Morocco)	1–0	(Egypt) Zamalek
Laba 90+4'	Report

Stade Municipal de Berkane, Berkane
Attendance: 13,000
Referee: Janny Sikazwe (Zambia)
26 May 2019
22:00 UTC+2

Zamalek (Egypt)	1–0	(Morocco) RS Berkane
Alaa 55' (pen.)	Report
Penalties
Boutaïb (penalty scored); Alaa (penalty scored); Gomaa (penalty scored); Obama (penalty scored); Sayed (penalty scored)	5–3	(penalty missed) Laachir; (penalty scored) Mokadem; (penalty scored) Laba; (penalty scored) Dayo

Borg El Arab Stadium, Alexandria
Attendance: 70,000
Referee: Bamlak Tessema Weyesa (Ethiopia)

1–1 on aggregate. Zamalek won 5–3 on penalties.

== Top goalscorers ==
Team eliminated / inactive for this round.

Rank	Player	Team	MD1	MD2	MD3	MD4	MD5	MD6	QF1	QF2	SF1	SF2	F1	F2	Total
1	(Sudan) Waleed Al-Shoala	(Sudan) Al-Hilal	1	1		1	1	2		1					7
2	(Togo) Kodjo Fo-Doh Laba	(Morocco) RS Berkane			2		1			1		1	1		6
3	(Morocco) Mouhcine Iajour	(Morocco) Raja Casablanca	1		2			1							4
3	(Rwanda) Jacques Tuyisenge	(Kenya) Gor Mahia	2		1			1							4
5	(Burkina Faso) Issoufou Dayo	(Morocco) RS Berkane		1						1		1			3
5	(Egypt) Ibrahim Hassan	(Egypt) Zamalek	2							1					3
5	(Zambia) Lazarous Kambole	(Zambia) ZESCO United	1		1	1									3
5	(Zambia) Ronald Kampamba	(Zambia) Nkana			2		1								3
5	(Tunisia) Alaeddine Marzouki	(Tunisia) CS Sfaxien		1						1	1				3
5	(Democratic Republic of the Congo) Freddy Tshimenga	(Zambia) Nkana		1	1				1						3

== See also ==
- 2018–19 CAF Champions League
- 2020 CAF Super Cup
