= Hamdi Laachir =

Moroccan footballer (born 1987)

Personal information
- Date of birth: 13 June 1987 (age 39)
- Place of birth: Casablanca, Morocco
- Height: 1.74 m (5 ft 9 in)
- Position: Forward

Senior career*
Years	Team	Apps	(Gls)
2009–2015	AS Salé	18	(0)
2015–2021	RS Berkane	125	(18)
2021–2022	IR Tanger	25	(2)
- * Club domestic league appearances and goals ‡ National team caps and goals as of 12 September 2022

Hamdi Laachir (Arabic: حمدي لعشير) is a Moroccan professional footballer who plays as a forward.

== Honours ==
=== Club ===
RS Berkane

- CAF Confederation Cup: 2019–20; runner-up: 2018–19
- Moroccan Throne Cup: 2018
- CAF Super Cup: runner-up: 2021
