= Omar Namsaoui =

Moroccan footballer

Personal information
- Full name: Omar Namsaoui
- Date of birth: 4 June 1990 (age 36)
- Place of birth: Fes, Morocco
- Height: 1.84 m (6 ft 0 in)
- Positions: Right back; right back

Team information
- Current team: RS Berkane
- Number: 23

Senior career*
Years	Team	Apps	(Gls)
2012–2016	Maghreb de Fès	71	(6)
2013	→ Raja Beni Mellal (loan)	10	(1)
2016–	RS Berkane	133	(4)
- * Club domestic league appearances and goals

Omar Namsaoui (Arabic: عمر النمساوي) is a Moroccan international footballer and coach. He played for RS Berkane and for the Morocco national football team. In 2025, he became an assistant coach for Wydad de Fès.

== Honours ==
Maghreb de Fès

- Moroccan Throne Cup: 2016

RS Berkane

- Moroccan Throne Cup: 2018
- CAF Confederation Cup: 2020; 2019 (runner-up)
