= Khalid Boutaïb =

Moroccan footballer (born 1987)

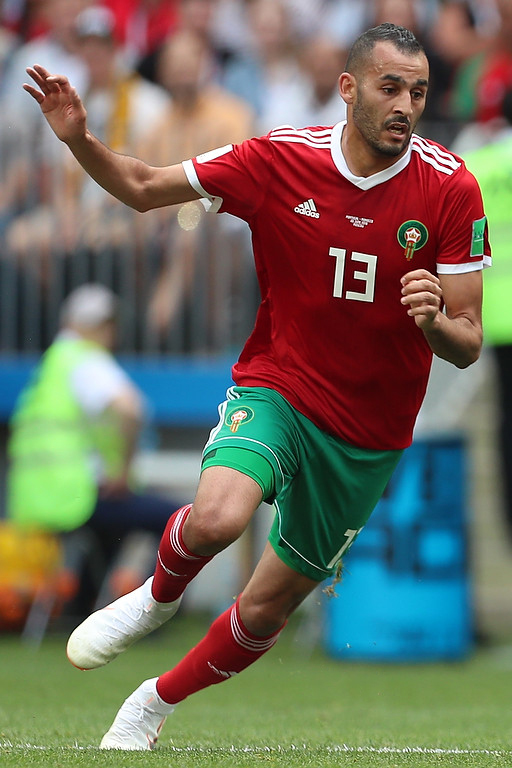
- Boutaib playing for Morocco at the 2018 FIFA World Cup

Personal information
- Date of birth: 24 April 1987 (age 39)
- Place of birth: Bagnols-sur-Cèze, France
- Height: 1.93 m (6 ft 4 in)
- Position: Striker

Senior career*
Years	Team	Apps	(Gls)
2006–2007	Bagnols Pont		
2007–2010	Uzès		
2010–2011	Bagnols Pont	14	(7)
2011–2012	Uzès	33	(13)
2012–2013	Istres	0	(0)
2012–2013	→ Uzès (loan)	24	(6)
2013–2014	Luzenac	33	(8)
2014–2016	Gazélec Ajaccio	59	(12)
2016–2017	Strasbourg	34	(20)
2017–2019	Yeni Malatyaspor	48	(16)
2019–2020	Zamalek	14	(4)
2020–2022	Le Havre	34	(7)
2022–2023	Paris	30	(6)
2023–2025	Pau	60	(16)
2025–2026	KAC Marrakech	13	(1)

International career^{‡}
2016–2019	Morocco	26	(9)
- * Club domestic league appearances and goals as of 12 May 2025 ‡ National team caps and goals as of 23 June 2019

Khalid Boutaïb (Arabic: خالد بوطيب; born 24 April 1987) is a former professional footballer who played as a striker. Born in France, he represented Morocco at international level.

== Early life ==
Boutaïb was born in Bagnols-sur-Cèze, in the south of France, to Moroccan parents. He acquired French nationality on 16 January 2002, through the collective effect of his mother's naturalization.

== Club career ==
Boutaïb started his career with spells at Bagnols Pont and Uzès, where he was part of the team that won promotion to the Championnat National in the 2011–12 season before joining Istres in the summer of 2012. Boutaïb made his professional debut in the 1–2 defeat to Clermont Foot in the Coupe de la Ligue on 7 August 2012, coming on as a half-time substitute for Ludovic Genest.

Boutaïb presents the particularity of being a gifted student as well. He obtained the maximal grade of 20/20 in mathematics in French High School exam. He chose however to continue his career as a football player.

Out of contract with Gazélec Ajaccio, Boutaïb joined Racing Strasbourg on a one-year contract.

Boutaïb signed with newly promoted Turkish Süper Lig side Yeni Malatyaspor in June 2017. In 2019, he joined Egyptian club Zamalek. In October 2020, Boutaïb returned to France to play for Le Havre.

On 31 January 2022, Boutaïb signed for Ligue 2 side Paris FC on a contract until June 2023.

== International career ==
Boutaïb announced his intention to represent Morocco at international level. In March 2016, he received a call-up to the Morocco national football team for 2017 Africa Cup of Nations qualification matches against Cape Verde, and made his debut for the match on 26 March 2016 as a late sub in a 1–0 win.

In May 2018, he was named in Morocco's 23-man squad for the 2018 FIFA World Cup in Russia.

== Personal life ==
Boutaïb is the uncle of the footballer Nassim Chadli.

== Career statistics ==
=== International ===
As of match played 23 June 2019

Morocco
Year	Apps	Goals
2016	5	2
2017	9	4
2018	9	3
2019	3	0
Total	26	9

=== International goals ===
Scores and results list Morocco's goal tally first.

No	Date	Venue	Opponent	Score	Result	Competition
1.	15 November 2016	Stade de Marrakech, Marrakesh, Morocco	Togo	1–1	2–1	Friendly
2.	15 November 2016	Stade de Marrakech, Marrakesh, Morocco	Togo	2–1	2–1	Friendly
3.	1 September 2017	Prince Moulay Abdellah Stadium, Rabat, Morocco	Mali	2–0	6–0	2018 FIFA World Cup qualification
4.	7 October 2017	Stade Mohammed V, Casablanca, Morocco	Gabon	1–0	3–0	2018 FIFA World Cup qualification
5.	7 October 2017	Stade Mohammed V, Casablanca, Morocco	Gabon	2–0	3–0	2018 FIFA World Cup qualification
6.	7 October 2017	Stade Mohammed V, Casablanca, Morocco	Gabon	3–0	3–0	2018 FIFA World Cup qualification
7.	23 March 2018	Stadio Olimpico Grande Torino, Turin, Italy	Serbia	2–1	2–1	Friendly
8.	25 June 2018	Kaliningrad Stadium, Kaliningrad, Russia	Spain	1–0	2–2	2018 FIFA World Cup
9.	16 October 2018	Stade Said Mohamed Cheikh, Mitsamiouli, Comoros	Comoros	1–1	2–2	2019 Africa Cup of Nations qualification

== Honours ==
Strasbourg

- Ligue 2: 2016–17

Zamalek

- Egypt Cup: 2018–19
- CAF Confederation Cup: 2018–19
