= Mohamed Aziz (footballer) =

Moroccan footballer (born 1984)

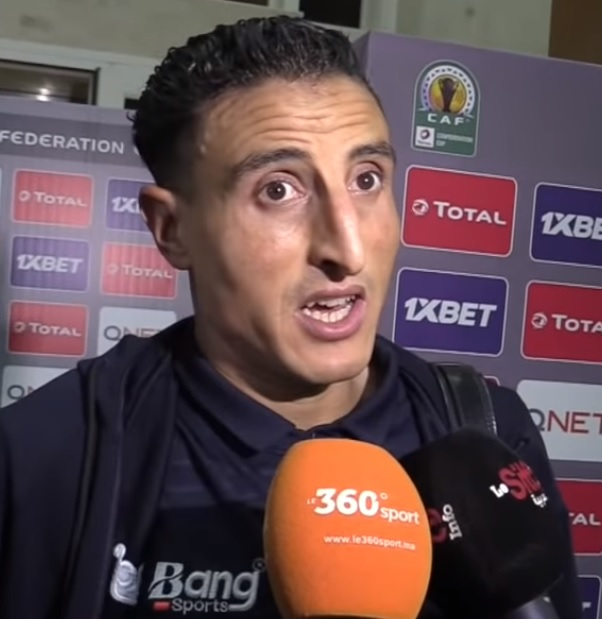

Personal information
- Full name: Mohamed Aziz
- Date of birth: 2 December 1984 (age 41)
- Place of birth: Sidi Kacem, Morocco
- Height: 1.85 m (6 ft 1 in)
- Position: Defender

Senior career*
Years	Team	Apps	(Gls)
2012–2022	RS Berkane	205	(25)

International career^{‡}
2016–	Morocco	1	(1)
- * Club domestic league appearances and goals as of 08:44, 9 July 2022 (UTC) ‡ National team caps and goals as of 08:44, 9 February 2016 (UTC)

Mohamed Aziz (born 2 December 1984) is a Moroccan former professional footballer. He retired in July 2022.

== International career ==
=== International goals ===
Scores and results list Morocco's goal tally first.

No	Date	Venue	Opponent	Score	Result	Competition
1.	24 January 2016	Amahoro Stadium, Kigali, Rwanda	Rwanda	2–0	4–1	2016 African Nations Championship

== Honours ==
RS Berkane

- CAF Confederation Cup: 2020
