= Hassania Agadir =

Moroccan association football club

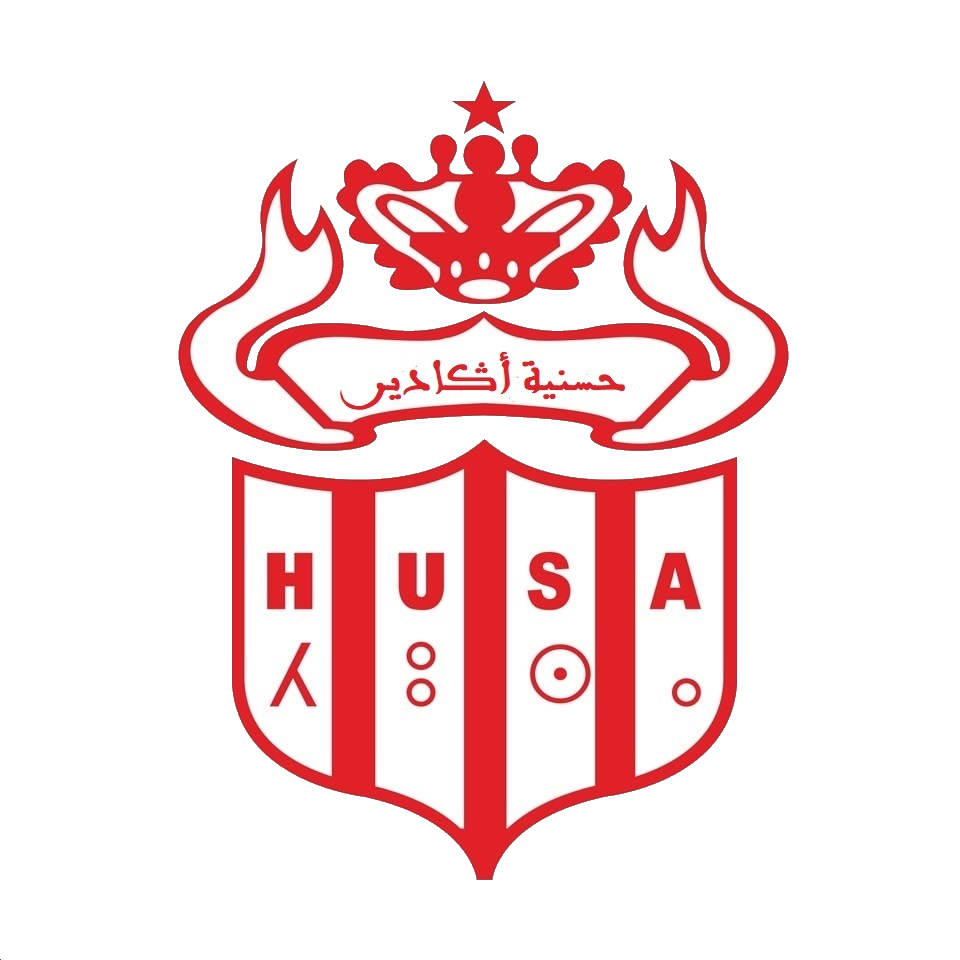
- Full name: Hassania Union Sport d'Agadir
- Nicknames: Souss gazelle Hassania of Resistance
- Short name: HUSA
- Founded: 22 December 1946; 79 years ago
- Ground: Adrar Stadium
- Capacity: 45,480
- Chairman: Amine Eddour
- Manager: Hilal Et-Tair
- League: Botola Pro
- 2025–26: Botola Pro, 12th of 16
- Website: www.husaofficial.com
Home colours	Away colours	Third colours

Hassania Union Sport d'Agadir (Standard Moroccan Tamazight: ⵜⴰⵎⵓⵏⵜ ⵜⴰⵡⵏⵏⵓⵏⵜ ⵜⴰⵍⵃⴰⵙⴰⵏⵜ ⵏ ⵓⴳⴰⴷⵉⵔ, romanized: tamunt tawnnunt talḥasant n ugadir) (Arabic: الحسنية الاتحاد الرياضي لأكادير, romanized: al-ḥasaniyya al-ittiḥād ar-riyāḍiyy li-ʾagādīr) commonly referred to as Hassania Agadir and known as l'Hassania, or simply as HUSA, is a Moroccan football club based in Agadir. The club was founded on 22 December 1946. It plays its home games at Adrar Stadium.

== History ==
=== Early years (1946–1963) ===
Hassania Union Sport d'Agadir was founded on 22 December 1946 by a group of patriots against French colonialism, and more particularly by Ahmed Kabbage, Abbas Kabbage, Hassan Oulhaj Akhannouch and Lahoucine Bijaouane, who are considered the founding fathers of the team. The founders chose a color for the team represented by two colors, red and white, and named it El Hassania, the name that expresses their adherence to their Moroccan identity.

Hassania Agadir appeared for the first time in its history at Ait Souss Stadium defying the French colonialism that refused to establish the club.

Since the establishment of the Hassania Club of Agadir in 1946, the founders of the club have appointed Hassan Oulhaj Akhannouch president of the club, and they have appointed Mr. Lahoucine Bijaouane as the general clerk of the club. The colonial French rejected the club's deposit file and kept standing in front of the establishment of the club. After the first match, Captain Chix summoned them to change the official shirt and to play outside Agadir, But the club refused and continued to train at the Marcala stadium, and they also played their match on it.

In 1956, Morocco gained independence, and the club was re-established, and it continued to struggle to qualify for the first division, and after two years of independence, the club succeeded in qualifying in the 1958/1959 season. At the end of February in 1960, the city of Agadir was hit by a strong earthquake, which claimed the lives of thousands, and among these victims were the Hassania Agadir players. After this disastrous ordeal passed, the team restructured itself again, and qualified in 1963 to the Throne Cup final.

=== The golden generation (2001-2008) ===
Hassania Agadir had not won any championship since its establishment until the 2001/2002 season, winning the Moroccan League title for the first time in its history. In the following season, the club won the title for the second time in a row, after Raja drew in its last match, so that Soussi club won the title for the second time in a row.

In 2006, Hassania Agadir will return to the competition for titles by reaching the Throne Cup final, a final that the Soussi team lost to Olympique Khouribga 1–0. The quarter-final witnessed a great surprise with Raja's withdrawal from the competition and not attending the Al Inbiaat stadium in Agadir. 2008/07 season, Hassania will present a good season and will occupy the fourth place, which qualified it to participate in the Arab Champions League.

=== Back to the podium (2018-2020) ===
After years of poor results and absence from the competition for titles, HUSA will return to compete in the Moroccan League for the 2018/17 season and will occupy the first place for more than half of the season, and by the end of the season, she will fall to third place. The same thing was repeated in the 2019/18 season, Hassania Agadir ranked third after a great competition with Olympique Safi, who drew in the last match, and Hassania qualified to participate in the African Confederation Cup. As for the Throne Cup, Hassania Agadir reached the final of the competition and lost the cup to Ittihad Casablanca by 2–1.

Hassania was on a date with history in the 2020/19 season, it qualified for the semi-finals of the African Confederation Cup for the first time in its history, and was eliminated against the other Moroccan team RS Berkane, with a score of 1–2.

== Honours ==
- Moroccan League First Division: 2

2002, 2003

- Coupe du Trône: 0

Runner-up : 1963, 2006, 2019

- Moroccan League Second Division: 1

1996

== Home stadium ==
The stadium is home to Hassania Agadir, replacing their old venue Stade Al Inbiaâte. The stadium was inaugurated on 11 October 2013, with a friendly match between local side Hassania Agadir and Algerian club JS Kabylie.

== Supporters ==
Hassania Agadir is encouraged by the two Ultras groups, the first is called "Imazighen" founded on 17 December 2006, and the second is the "Red Rebels" in July 2011.

== Performance in CAF competitions ==
- CAF Champions League: 2 appearances

2003 – Second Round
2004 – Second Round

- CAF Confederation Cup: 3 appearances

2007 – Second Round
2018–19 – Quarter Finals
2019–20 – Semi-Finals

== Current squad ==
As of 2 October 2026

Note: Flags indicate national team as defined under FIFA eligibility rules; some limited exceptions apply. Players may hold more than one non-FIFA nationality.

No.	Pos.	Nation	Player
1	GK	ALG	Gaya Merbah
2	MF	MAR	Ayoub Benaadi
3	MF	MAR	Badreddine Octobre
5	MF	MAR	Jalal Tachtach
6	DF	MAR	Mouad Bahsain
7	FW	MAR	Salaheddine Benyachou
9	FW	FRA	Walid Jarmouni
10	MF	MAR	Abderrahmane Qassaq
11	FW	MAR	Amine Azri
14	MF	MAR	Abdelali Ait Brayim
15	DF	MAR	Ayoub Qasmi
16	MF	BEN	Rodrigue Kossi
17	MF	MAR	Hamza Moumadi
19	DF	POR	Euclides Cabral

No.	Pos.	Nation	Player
20	FW	MAR	Imad Riahi
22	GK	MAR	Hamza Antara
23	FW	MAR	Hamid Ahadad
24	DF	MAR	Ayoub Boucheta
26	FW	MAR	Youssef Arbidi
27	DF	MAR	Ayman Tarrazi
30	DF	MAR	Soulaiman El Amrani
31	GK	MAR	Ilyass Motik
32	MF	MAR	Mehdi Akoumi
33	FW	MAR	Fahd Bendahmane
34	DF	MAR	Ismail Hrila
36	DF	MAR	Younes El Amali
42	MF	CIV	Mohamed Doumbia
45	DF	MAR	Ayoub Sahnoune

Hassania Agadir historical kit.

== Managers ==
- (Romania) Ion Oblemenco (1996)
- (Romania) Marcel Pigulea (1996–1997)
- (Morocco) Mohamed Fakhir (2002–03)
- (Romania) Aurel Țicleanu (2004)
- (Romania) Eugen Moldovan (2005–06)
- (Argentina) Miguel Angel Gamondi (7 January 2007 – 14 November 2007)
- (Algeria) Azzedine Aït Djoudi (2007–08)
- (Romania) Eugen Moldovan (2008–09)
- (France) Jean-François Jodar (1 July 2009 – 11 June)
- (France) Hubert Velud (5 July 2011 – 4 October 2011)
- (Morocco) Mustapha Madih (1 November 2011 – 7 April 2014)
- (Morocco) Abdelhadi Sektioui ( 23 June 2014 - 4 April 2017)
- (Argentina) Miguel Angel Gamondi (1 July 2017 – 19 November 2019)
- (Morocco) Mohamed Fakhir (20 November 2019 – 21 January 2020)
- (Morocco) Mustapha Ouchrif (22 January 2020 – 6 August 2021)
- (Morocco) Abdelhadi Sektioui (10 December 2021 – 28 July 2022)
- (Brazil) Marcos Paquetá (28 July 2022 – 8 Mars 2023)
- (Morocco) Abdelhadi Sektioui (9 Mars 2023– present)
