= 2019–20 CAF Confederation Cup =

International football competition in Africa

2019–20 Total CAF Confederation Cup
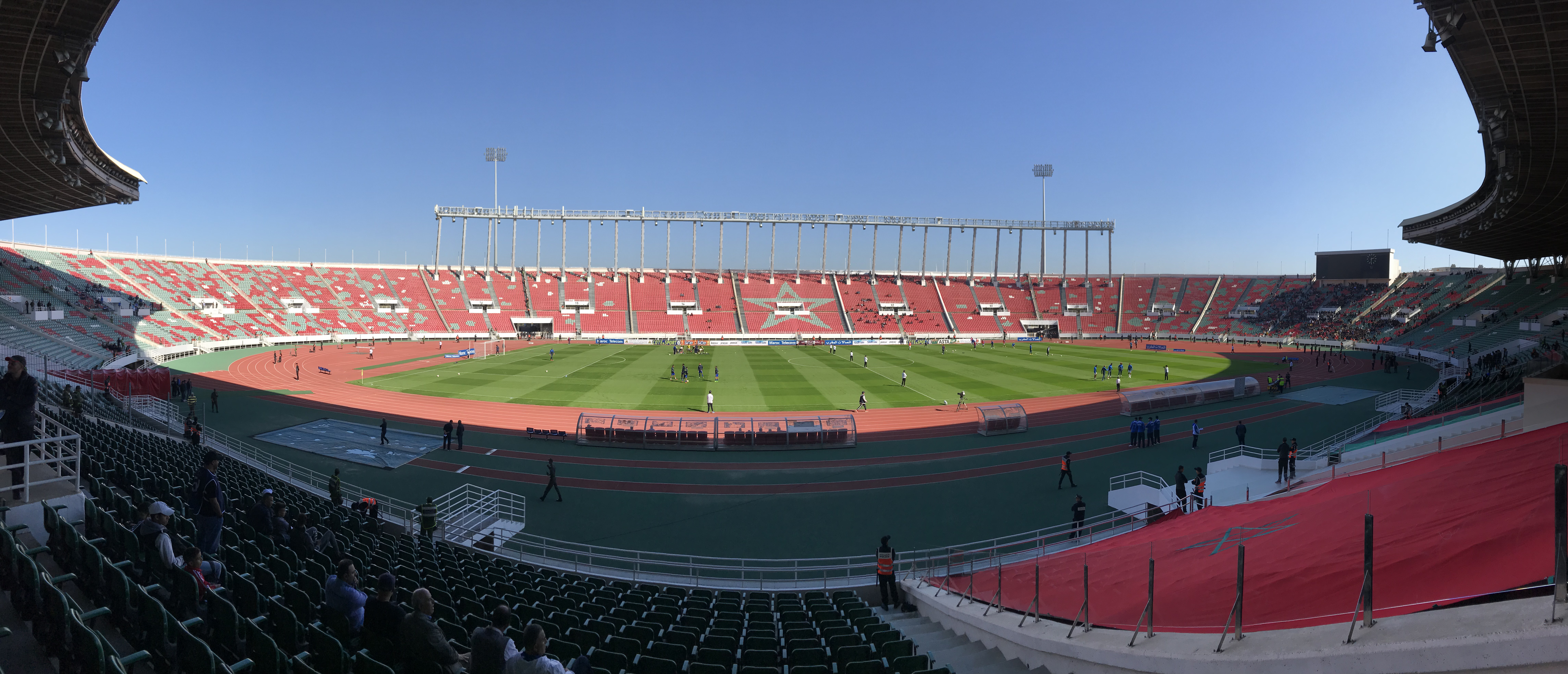
- Prince Moulay Abdellah Stadium in Rabat, Morocco, hosted the final

Tournament details
- Dates: Qualification: 9 August – 3 November 2019; Main competition: 1 December 2019 – 25 October 2020
- Teams: Group stage: 16; Total: 53+16 (from 44 associations)

Final positions
- Champions: (Morocco) RS Berkane (1st title)
- Runners-up: (Egypt) Pyramids

Tournament statistics
- Matches played: 59
- Goals scored: 133 (2.25 per match)
- Top scorer(s): (Morocco) Karim El Berkaoui (8 goals)

The 2019–20 CAF Confederation Cup, officially the 2019–20 Total CAF Confederation Cup for sponsorship purposes, was the 17th season of CAF Confederation Cup and the 28th overall season of Africa's secondary club football tournament organized by the Confederation of African Football (CAF).

This is the second season to follow an August–to-May schedule, as per the decision of the CAF Executive Committee on 20 July 2017. However, the COVID-19 pandemic in Africa caused the semi-finals and final of this season to be postponed until October 2020 and the final itself was played as a single match for the first time at a venue pre-selected by CAF, which was later revealed to be the Prince Moulay Abdellah Stadium in Rabat, Morocco.

The winners of this season's edition earned the right to play against the winners of the 2019–20 CAF Champions League in the 2020–21 CAF Super Cup. Zamalek were the title holders, but as they qualified for the group stage of the following season's CAF Champions League, they were not able to defend their title.

== Association team allocation ==
All 56 CAF member associations may enter the CAF Confederation Cup, with the 12 highest ranked associations according to their CAF 5-year ranking eligible to enter two teams in the competition. As a result, theoretically a maximum of 68 teams could enter the tournament (plus 16 teams eliminated from the CAF Champions League which enter the play-off round) – although this level has never been reached.

For the 2019–20 CAF Confederation Cup, the CAF uses the 2015–2019 CAF 5-year ranking, which calculates points for each entrant association based on their clubs' performance over those 5 years in the CAF Champions League and CAF Confederation Cup. The criteria for points are the following:

	CAF Champions League	CAF Confederation Cup
Winners	6 points	5 points
Runners-up	5 points	4 points
Losing semi-finalists	4 points	3 points
Losing quarter-finalists (from 2017)	3 points	2 points
3rd place in groups	2 points	1 point
4th place in groups	1 point	0.5 point

The points are multiplied by a coefficient according to the year as follows:

- 2018–19 – 5
- 2018 – 4
- 2017 – 3
- 2016 – 2
- 2015 – 1

This was announced by the CAF on 4 June 2019, as using the previous scheme, it would be based on results from 2014 to 2018. The only change for the top 12 associations is that Tanzania is included while Ivory Coast is excluded.

== Teams ==
The following 53 teams from 42 associations entered the competition.

- Eleven teams (in **bold**) received a bye to the first round.
- The other 42 teams entered the preliminary round.

Associations are shown according to their 2015–2019 CAF 5-year ranking – those with a ranking score have their rank and score indicated.

Associations eligible to enter two teams (Ranked 1–12)
Association	Team	Qualifying method
Tunisia (1st – 154 pts)	**CS Sfaxien**	2018–19 Tunisian Ligue Professionnelle 1 third place
Tunisia (1st – 154 pts)	US Ben Guerdane	2018–19 Tunisian Ligue Professionnelle 1 fourth place
Morocco (2nd – 153 pts)	**Hassania Agadir**	2018–19 Botola third place
Morocco (2nd – 153 pts)	**RS Berkane**	2018 Moroccan Throne Cup winners
Egypt (3rd – 120.5 pts)	Pyramids	2018–19 Egyptian Premier League third place
Egypt (3rd – 120.5 pts)	**Al-Masry**	2018–19 Egyptian Premier League fourth place
Algeria (4th – 92 pts)	Paradou AC	2018–19 Algerian Ligue Professionnelle 1 third place
Algeria (4th – 92 pts)	CR Belouizdad	2018–19 Algerian Cup winners
DR Congo (5th – 87 pts)	DC Motema Pembe	2018–19 Linafoot third place
DR Congo (5th – 87 pts)	AS Maniema Union	2019 Coupe du Congo DR winners
South Africa (6th – 76.5 pts)	**Bidvest Wits**	2018–19 South African Premier Division third place
South Africa (6th – 76.5 pts)	TS Galaxy	2018–19 Nedbank Cup winners
Zambia (7th – 40.5 pts)	Buildcon	2019 Zambia Super League third place
Zambia (7th – 40.5 pts)	**Zanaco**	2019 Zambia Super League fourth place
Sudan (8th – 35 pts)	Al-Ahly Shendi	2018–19 Sudan Premier League third place
Sudan (8th – 35 pts)	Al-Khartoum	2018–19 Sudan Premier League fourth place
Nigeria (9th – 32.5 pts)	**Enugu Rangers**	2019 Nigeria Professional Football League third place
Nigeria (9th – 32.5 pts)	Niger Tornadoes	2019 Nigeria Federation Cup runners-up
Guinea (10th – 30 pts)	Santoba	2018–19 Guinée Championnat National third place
Guinea (10th – 30 pts)	CI Kamsar	2019 Guinée Coupe Nationale runners-up
Tanzania (12th – 18 pts)	Azam	2018–19 Tanzania FA Cup winners
Tanzania (12th – 18 pts)	KMC	2018–19 Tanzanian Premier League fourth place

Associations eligible to enter one team
Association	Team	Qualifying method
Ivory Coast (13th – 15 pts)	**FC San Pédro**	2019 Coupe de Côte d'Ivoire winners
Kenya (14th – 14 pts)	Bandari	2019 FKF President's Cup winners
Congo (16th – 11.5 pts)	Étoile du Congo	2018–19 Congo Ligue 1 runners-up
Uganda (17th – 11 pts)	Proline	2019 Uganda Cup winners
Libya (18th – 10 pts)	Al-Ittihad	2018 Libyan Cup winners
Ghana (19th – 9 pts)	Ashanti Gold	2019 GFA Normalization Committee Special Competition Tier 2 winners
Rwanda (T-20th – 8 pts)	AS Kigali	2019 Rwandan Cup winners
Zimbabwe (T-20th – 8 pts)	Triangle United	2018 Cup of Zimbabwe winners
Eswatini (22nd – 7 pts)	Young Buffaloes	2019 Eswatini Cup winners
Ethiopia (23rd – 6 pts)	Fasil Kenema	2019 Ethiopian Cup winners
Botswana (T-24th – 4 pts)	Jwaneng Galaxy	2018–19 Mascom Top 8 Cup winners
Togo (T-24th – 4 pts)	Maranatha	2018–19 Togolese Championnat National runners-up
Cameroon (T-26th – 3 pts)	Stade Renard de Melong	2019 Cameroonian Cup winners
Mali (T-26th – 3 pts)	**Djoliba**	2018 Malian Cup runners-up
Burkina Faso (28th – 2.5 pts)	**Salitas**	2018–19 Burkinabé Premier League runners-up
Gabon (29th – 1.5 pts)	AS Pélican	2019 Gabon Championnat National D1 runners-up
Benin	ESAE	2019 Benin Cup winners
Burundi	Rukinzo	2019 Burundian Cup runners-up
Chad	AS CotonTchad	2019 Chad Premier League runners-up
Djibouti	Arta/Solar7	2019 Djibouti Cup winners
Equatorial Guinea	Akonangui	2019 Equatoguinean Cup winners
Liberia	LISCR	2019 Liberian FA Cup winners
Madagascar	**CNaPS Sport**	2019 Coupe de Madagascar runners-up
Malawi	Masters Security	2018 Malawi Carlsberg Cup winners
Mauritania	ASC Snim	2019 Coupe du Président de la République winners
Mauritius	Bolton City	2019 Mauritian Cup winners
Niger	USGN	2019 Niger Cup runners-up
Seychelles	Saint Louis Suns United	2018–19 Seychelles FA Cup winners
Somalia	Mogadishu City	2018 Somalia Cup winners
South Sudan	Amarat United	2019 South Sudan National Cup winners
Zanzibar	Malindi	2019 Zanzibari Cup winners

A further 16 teams eliminated from the 2019–20 CAF Champions League enter the play-off round.

Losers of 2019–20 CAF Champions League first round
(Libya) Al-Nasr	(Guinea) Horoya	(Togo) ASC Kara	(Nigeria) Enyimba
(Kenya) Gor Mahia	(Equatorial Guinea) Cano Sport	(Senegal) Génération Foot	(Ghana) Asante Kotoko
(Uganda) KCCA	(Seychelles) Côte d'Or	(Mauritania) FC Nouadhibou	(Chad) Elect-Sport
(Tanzania) Young Africans	(Mozambique) Songo	(Zambia) Green Eagles	(Madagascar) Fosa Juniors

Notes

1. Libya (LBY): For the second consecutive season, Libya were represented by Al-Ittihad, the 2018 Libyan Cup winners, as the 2018–19 Libyan Premier League was suspended and the Libyan Cup was not played in 2018–19.
2. Mali (MLI): For the second consecutive season, Mali were represented by Djoliba, the 2018 Malian Cup runners-up, as the Malian Première Division and Malian Cup were not played in 2018–19.
3. Morocco (MAR): For the second consecutive season, Morocco were represented by RS Berkane, the 2018 Moroccan Throne Cup winners, as the 2018–19 Moroccan Throne Cup was not completed in time.

Associations which did not enter a team

- Angola (11th – 21.5 pts; eligible for two entrants)
- Cape Verde
- Central African Republic
- Comoros
- Eritrea
- Gambia
- Guinea-Bissau
- Lesotho
- Namibia
- Réunion
- São Tomé and Príncipe
- Sierra Leone

Associations which did not enter a team initially, but had a team transferred from Champions League

- Mozambique (15th – 13 pts)
- Senegal
Location of teams of the 2018–19 CAF Confederation Cup.
Italics: Teams transferred from the 2019–20 CAF Champions League.
Red: Preliminary round; Green: First Round; Purple: Play-off Round;
Brown: Group A; Orange: Group B; Yellow: Group C; Blue: Group D.

== Schedule ==
The schedule of the competition is as follows.

On 24 November 2019, CAF made a change to all fixtures dates starting from the group stage matchday 4 to the final, due to rescheduling of the 2020 African Nations Championship from January/February to April. The quarter-finals draw date was also changed.

Following the quarter-finals, due to the COVID-19 pandemic in Africa, the semi-finals, originally scheduled for 3 May (first legs) and 10 May (second legs), were postponed indefinitely on 11 April 2020, and the final, originally scheduled for 24 May, was also postponed on 18 April 2020. On 30 June 2020, the CAF Executive Committee proposed that the competition would resume with a Final Four format played as single matches in Morocco. On 3 August 2020, the CAF announced that the competition would resume with the semi-finals played on 22 September, and the final played on 27 September. On 10 September 2020, the CAF announced that at the request of the Royal Moroccan Football Federation, the semi-finals were rescheduled to 19–20 October, and the final to 25 October.

Phase	Round	Draw date	First leg	Second leg
Qualifying	Preliminary round	21 July 2019	9–11 August 2019	23–25 August 2019
Qualifying	First round	21 July 2019	13–15 September 2019	27–29 September 2019
Qualifying	Play-off round	9 October 2019	27 October 2019	3 November 2019
Group stage	Matchday 1	12 November 2019	1 December 2019	
Group stage	Matchday 2	12 November 2019	8 December 2019	
Group stage	Matchday 3	12 November 2019	29 December 2019	
Group stage	Matchday 4	12 November 2019	12 January 2020	
Group stage	Matchday 5	12 November 2019	26 January 2020	
Group stage	Matchday 6	12 November 2019	2 February 2020	
Knockout stage	Quarter-finals	5 February 2020	1 March 2020	8 March 2020
Knockout stage	Semi-finals	5 February 2020	19–20 October 2020	
Knockout stage	Final	5 February 2020	25 October 2020	

== Qualifying rounds ==
The draw for the preliminary round and first round was held on 21 July 2019 at the CAF headquarters in Cairo, Egypt. In the qualifying rounds, each tie was played on a home-and-away two-legged basis. If the aggregate score was tied after the second leg, the away goals rule was applied, and if still tied, extra time was not played, and the penalty shoot-out was used to determine the winner (Regulations III. 13 & 14).

=== Preliminary round ===
Team 1	Agg.	Team 2	1st leg	2nd leg
ASC Snim (Mauritania)	0–7	(Benin) ESAE	0–5	0–2
USGN (Niger)	1–3	(Libya) Al-Ittihad	1–1	0–2
Maranatha (Togo)	3–0	(Liberia) LISCR	3–0	0–0
AS Pélican (Gabon)	2–2 (4–1 p)	(Democratic Republic of the Congo) AS Maniema Union	1–1	1–1
Paradou AC (Algeria)	3–1	(Guinea) CI Kamsar	3–0	0–1
Bolton City (Mauritius)	3–2	(Botswana) Jwaneng Galaxy	3–1	0–1
Mogadishu City (Somalia)	0–1	(Zanzibar) Malindi	0–0	0–1
Akonangui (Equatorial Guinea)	1–4	(Ghana) Ashanti Gold	1–1	0–3
Niger Tornadoes (Nigeria)	4–5	(Guinea) Santoba	1–2	3–3
TS Galaxy (South Africa)	2–0	(Seychelles) Saint Louis Suns United	1–0	1–0
Buildcon (Zambia)	1–2	(Eswatini) Young Buffaloes	0–1	1–1
Arta/Solar7 (Djibouti)	1–4	(Sudan) Al-Khartoum	1–1	0–3
DC Motema Pembe (Democratic Republic of the Congo)	4–0	(Cameroon) Stade Renard de Melong	2–0	2–0
AS Kigali (Rwanda)	2–1	(Tanzania) KMC	0–0	2–1
Proline (Uganda)	3–0	(Malawi) Masters Security	3–0	0–0
Bandari (Kenya)	1–1 (a)	(Sudan) Al-Ahly Shendi	0–0	1–1
US Ben Guerdane (Tunisia)	5–1	(South Sudan) Amarat United	5–1	0–0
Fasil Kenema (Ethiopia)	2–3	(Tanzania) Azam	1–0	1–3
Triangle United (Zimbabwe)	5–0	(Burundi) Rukinzo	5–0	0–0
Pyramids (Egypt)	5–1	(Republic of the Congo) Étoile du Congo	4–1	1–0
CR Belouizdad (Algeria)	4–0	(Chad) AS CotonTchad	2–0	2–0

=== First round ===
The 16 winners of the first round advanced to the play-off round, where they were joined by the 16 losers of the Champions League first round.

Team 1	Agg.	Team 2	1st leg	2nd leg
ESAE (Benin)	0–0 (3–2 p)	(Burkina Faso) Salitas	0–0	0–0
Al-Ittihad (Libya)	1–1 (a)	(Morocco) Hassania Agadir	1–1	0–0
Maranatha (Togo)	2–3	(Mali) Djoliba	1–2	1–1
AS Pélican (Gabon)	3–4	(Nigeria) Enugu Rangers	2–1	1–3
Paradou AC (Algeria)	3–1	(Tunisia) CS Sfaxien	3–1	0–0
Bolton City (Mauritius)	1–5	(Zambia) Zanaco	1–2	0–3
Malindi (Zanzibar)	2–7	(Egypt) Al-Masry	1–4	1–3
Ashanti Gold (Ghana)	3–4	(Morocco) RS Berkane	3–2	0–2
Santoba (Guinea)	0–3	(Ivory Coast) FC San Pédro	0–0	0–3
TS Galaxy (South Africa)	4–1	(Madagascar) CNaPS Sport	1–0	3–1
Young Buffaloes (Eswatini)	1–3	(South Africa) Bidvest Wits	1–0	0–3
Al-Khartoum (Sudan)	3–3 (1–3 p)	(Democratic Republic of the Congo) DC Motema Pembe	1–2	2–1
AS Kigali (Rwanda)	2–3	(Uganda) Proline	1–1	1–2
Bandari (Kenya)	3–2	(Tunisia) US Ben Guerdane	2–0	1–2
Azam (Tanzania)	0–2	(Zimbabwe) Triangle United	0–1	0–1
Pyramids (Egypt)	2–1	(Algeria) CR Belouizdad	1–1	1–0

=== Play-off round ===
The draw for the play-off round was held on 9 October 2019, 19:00 CAT (UTC+2), at the Hilton Pyramids Golf in Cairo, Egypt. The winners of the Confederation Cup first round were drawn against the losers of the Champions League first round, with the teams from the Confederation Cup hosting the second leg. The 16 winners of the play-off round advanced to the group stage.

Team 1	Agg.	Team 2	1st leg	2nd leg
Horoya (Guinea)	5–2	(Kenya) Bandari	4–2	1–0
Young Africans (Tanzania)	1–5	(Egypt) Pyramids	1–2	0–3
Enyimba (Nigeria)	4–1	(South Africa) TS Galaxy	2–0	2–1
Génération Foot (Senegal)	1–1 (3–4 p)	(Benin) ESAE	0–1	1–0
Asante Kotoko (Ghana)	1–2	(Ivory Coast) FC San Pédro	1–0	0–2
KCCA (Uganda)	1–4	(Algeria) Paradou AC	0–0	1–4
Gor Mahia (Kenya)	2–3	(Democratic Republic of the Congo) DC Motema Pembe	1–1	1–2
UD Songo (Mozambique)	1–8	(South Africa) Bidvest Wits	1–2	0–6
Elect-Sport (Chad)	0–5	(Mali) Djoliba	0–1	0–4
Green Eagles (Zambia)	2–3	(Morocco) Hassania Agadir	1–1	1–2
Cano Sport (Equatorial Guinea)	2–8	(Zambia) Zanaco	1–3	1–5
Fosa Juniors (Madagascar)	2–5	(Morocco) RS Berkane	2–0	0–5
Côte d'Or (Seychelles)	0–6	(Egypt) Al-Masry	0–4	0–2
ASC Kara (Togo)	2–2 (a)	(Nigeria) Enugu Rangers	2–1	0–1
FC Nouadhibou (Mauritania)	4–3	(Zimbabwe) Triangle United	2–0	2–3
Al-Nasr (Libya)	4–2	(Uganda) Proline	2–2	2–0

== Group stage ==
The draw for the group stage was held on 12 November 2019, 12:00 CAT (UTC+2), at the CAF headquarters in Cairo, Egypt. The 16 teams, all winners of the play-off round of qualifying, were drawn into four groups of four.

The teams were seeded by their performances in the CAF competitions for the previous five seasons (CAF 5-year ranking points shown in parentheses). Each group contained one team from Pot 1, one team from Pot 2 and two teams from Pot 3, and each team was drawn into one of the positions in their group.

Pot	Pot 1	Pot 2	Pot 3
Teams	(Guinea) Horoya (30 pts); (Morocco) RS Berkane (28 pts); (Nigeria) Enyimba (16 pts); (Egypt) Al-Masry (12 pts)	(Morocco) Hassania Agadir (10 pts); (Zambia) Zanaco (6 pts); (Nigeria) Enugu Rangers (5 pts); (Mali) Djoliba (2 pts)	(Algeria) Paradou AC; (Benin) ESAE; (Democratic Republic of the Congo) DC Motema Pembe; (Egypt) Pyramids; (Ivory Coast) FC San Pédro; (Libya) Al-Nasr; (Mauritania) FC Nouadhibou; (South Africa) Bidvest Wits

In each group, teams play against each other home-and-away in a round-robin format. The group winners and runners-up advance to the quarter-finals of the knockout stage.

Tiebreakers
Teams are ranked according to points (3 points for a win, 1 point for a draw, 0 points for a loss). If tied on points, tiebreakers are applied in the following order (Regulations III. 20 & 21):
1. Points in head-to-head matches among tied teams;
2. Goal difference in head-to-head matches among tied teams;
3. Goals scored in head-to-head matches among tied teams;
4. Away goals scored in head-to-head matches among tied teams;
5. If more than two teams are tied, and after applying all head-to-head criteria above, a subset of teams are still tied, all head-to-head criteria above are reapplied exclusively to this subset of teams;
6. Goal difference in all group matches;
7. Goals scored in all group matches;
8. Away goals scored in all group matches;
9. Drawing of lots.

=== Group A ===
Pos	Team	Pld	W	D	L	GF	GA	GD	Pts	Qualification	PYR	MAS	RAN	FCN
1	(Egypt) Pyramids	6	5	0	1	14	3	+11	15	Advance to knockout stage	—	2–0	0–1	6–0
2	(Egypt) Al-Masry	6	3	1	2	10	9	+1	10	Advance to knockout stage	1–2	—	4–2	1–0
3	(Nigeria) Enugu Rangers	6	1	3	2	6	9	−3	6		1–3	1–1	—	1–1
4	(Mauritania) FC Nouadhibou	6	0	2	4	3	12	−9	2		0–1	2–3	0–0	—

Source: CAF

=== Group B ===
Pos	Team	Pld	W	D	L	GF	GA	GD	Pts	Qualification	HOR	NAS	DJO	BID
1	(Guinea) Horoya	6	4	2	0	8	1	+7	14	Advance to knockout stage	—	3–0	1–0	2–1
2	(Libya) Al-Nasr	6	2	2	2	4	7	−3	8 (Note: Head-to-head points: Al-Nasr 4, Djoliba 1.)	Advance to knockout stage	0–2	—	1–1	2–1
3	(Mali) Djoliba	6	2	2	2	4	3	+1	8		0–0	0–1	—	1–0
4	(South Africa) Bidvest Wits	6	0	2	4	2	7	−5	2		0–0	0–0	0–2	—

Source: CAF

=== Group C ===
Pos	Team	Pld	W	D	L	GF	GA	GD	Pts	Qualification	RSB	ZAN	DCM	ESA
1	(Morocco) RS Berkane	6	3	2	1	13	4	+9	11	Advance to knockout stage	—	1–1	3–0	3–0
2	(Zambia) Zanaco	6	2	4	0	8	4	+4	10 (Note: Head-to-head points: Zanaco 4, DC Motema Pembe 1.)	Advance to knockout stage	1–1	—	2–1	3–0
3	(Democratic Republic of the Congo) DC Motema Pembe	6	3	1	2	6	6	0	10		1–0	1–1	—	1–0
4	(Benin) ESAE	6	0	1	5	1	14	−13	1		1–5	0–0	0–2	—

Source: CAF

=== Group D ===
Pos	Team	Pld	W	D	L	GF	GA	GD	Pts	Qualification	HAS	ENY	PAC	SNP
1	(Morocco) Hassania Agadir	6	3	2	1	9	5	+4	11	Advance to knockout stage	—	2–0	0–3	3–0
2	(Nigeria) Enyimba	6	3	1	2	11	7	+4	10	Advance to knockout stage	1–1	—	4–1	1–0
3	(Algeria) Paradou AC	6	2	2	2	5	6	−1	8		0–2	1–0	—	0–0
4	(Ivory Coast) FC San Pédro	6	0	3	3	3	10	−7	3		1–1	2–5	0–0	—

Source: CAF

== Knockout stage ==
In the knockout stage, the quarter-finals were played over two legs, with each team playing one leg at home. The team that scored more goals on aggregate over the two legs advanced to the next round. If the aggregate score was level, the away goals rule is applied, i.e. the team that scored more goals away from home over the two legs advanced. If away goals were also equal, then extra time was not played and the winners were decided by a penalty shoot-out.

The semi-finals were originally to be played over two legs, but were played as single matches after the format change due to the COVID-19 pandemic.

In the final, which was played as a single match, if the score was level at the end of normal time, extra time was also not to be played and the winners would be decided by a penalty shoot-out.

The mechanism of the draws for each round was as follows:

- In the draw for the quarter-finals, the four group winners were seeded, and the four group runners-up were unseeded. The seeded teams were drawn against the unseeded teams, with the seeded teams hosting the second leg. Teams from the same group could not be drawn against each other, while teams from the same association could be drawn against each other.
- In the draws for semi-finals, there were no seedings, and teams from the same group or the same association could be drawn against each other. As the draws for the quarter-finals and semi-finals were held together before the quarter-finals were played, the identity of the quarter-final winners was not known at the time of the semi-final draw.

=== Bracket ===
The bracket was decided after the draw for the knockout stage (quarter-finals and semi-finals), which was held on 5 February 2020, 19:00 CAT (UTC+2), at the Hilton Pyramids Golf in Cairo, Egypt.

Quarter-finals
(Zambia) Zanaco	0	1	1
(Egypt) Pyramids	3	0	3
(Nigeria) Enyimba	1	0	1
(Guinea) Horoya	1	2	3
(Egypt) Al-Masry	2	0	2
(Morocco) RS Berkane	2	1	3
(Libya) Al-Nasr	0	0	0
(Morocco) Hassania Agadir	5	2	7

Semi-finals
(Egypt) Pyramids	2
(Guinea) Horoya	0
(Morocco) RS Berkane	2
(Morocco) Hassania Agadir	1

Final
(Egypt) Pyramids	0
(Morocco) RS Berkane	1

=== Quarter-finals ===
Team 1	Agg.	Team 2	1st leg	2nd leg
Zanaco (Zambia)	1–3	(Egypt) Pyramids	0–3	1–0
Al-Nasr (Libya)	0–7	(Morocco) Hassania Agadir	0–5	0–2
Al-Masry (Egypt)	2–3	(Morocco) RS Berkane	2–2	0–1
Enyimba (Nigeria)	1–3	(Guinea) Horoya	1–1	0–2

=== Semi-finals ===
Due to the COVID-19 pandemic in Africa, all semi-final matches, originally scheduled for 1–2 May (first legs) and 8–9 May 2020 (second legs), were postponed until further notice. The matches were later rescheduled as single matches in Morocco for 19–20 October 2020, at Prince Moulay Abdellah Stadium, Rabat and Stade Mohamed V, Casablanca.

Team 1	Score	Team 2
Pyramids (Egypt)	2–0	(Guinea) Horoya
RS Berkane (Morocco)	2–1	(Morocco) Hassania Agadir

=== Final ===
Due to the COVID-19 pandemic, the final, originally scheduled for 24 May 2020, 19:00 GMT, at the Prince Moulay Abdellah Stadium, Rabat, Morocco, was postponed until further notice. The final was later rescheduled for 25 October 2020.

25 October 2020
19:00 (20:00 UTC+1)

Pyramids (Egypt)	0–1	(Morocco) RS Berkane
	Report	Dayo 15'

Prince Moulay Abdellah Stadium, Rabat
Attendance: 0 (Note: Final match played behind closed doors due to the COVID-19 pandemic in Morocco.)
Referee: Sidi Alioum (Cameroon)

== Top goalscorers ==
Team eliminated / inactive for this round.

Rank	Player	Team	MD1	MD2	MD3	MD4	MD5	MD6	QF1	QF2	SF	F	Total
1	(Morocco) Karim El Berkaoui	(Morocco) Hassania Agadir	1			3			3	1			8
2	(Nigeria) Stanley Dimgba	(Nigeria) Enyimba				3		1					4
2	(Egypt) Mohamed Farouk	(Egypt) Pyramids	1	2					1				4
4	(Morocco) Alaedine Ajaray	(Morocco) RS Berkane					3						3
4	(Nigeria) Austin Amutu	(Egypt) Al-Masry	2	1									3
4	(Ghana) John Antwi	(Egypt) Pyramids		1	1			1					3
4	(Morocco) Mohamed Aziz	(Morocco) RS Berkane					1				2		3
4	(Senegal) Malick Cissé	(Morocco) Hassania Agadir	1						2				3
4	(Guinea) Boniface Haba	(Guinea) Horoya					1	1	1				3
4	(Zambia) Rodgers Kola	(Zambia) Zanaco				2				1			3
4	(Democratic Republic of the Congo) Vinny Kombe	(Democratic Republic of the Congo) DC Motema Pembe		2			1						3
4	(Morocco) Hamdi Laachir	(Morocco) RS Berkane	1		1		1						3
4	(Nigeria) Victor Mbaoma	(Nigeria) Enyimba				1		2					3
4	(Nigeria) Augustine Oladapo	(Nigeria) Enyimba					1	1	1				3
4	(Burkina Faso) Eric Traoré	(Egypt) Pyramids		2		1							3

== See also ==
- 2019–20 CAF Champions League
- 2020–21 CAF Super Cup
