= 2019–20 in Egyptian football =

Football in Egypt
- Season: 2019–20

Men's football
- Premier League: Al Ahly
- Second Division: None (Note: The league consists of multiple regional groups, with the winners of each group earning promotion to the next higher league or advancing to a further round to decide promoted teams. There are no official champions for these leagues recognized by the Egyptian Football Association as of the 2019–20 season.)
- Third Division: None
- Fourth Division: None
- Cup: Al Ahly
- Super Cup: Zamalek

Women's football
- Premier League: Wadi Degla

The 2019–20 season was the 102nd season of competitive association football in Egypt.

== National teams ==
=== Kits ===
| Home | Home alt. | Home alt. 2 | Away | Away alt. |

=== Egypt national football team ===
==== Results and fixtures ====
===== Friendlies =====
| 14 October 2019 International Friendly | Egypt | 1–0 | Botswana | Alexandria, Egypt |
| 19:00 CAT (UTC+2) | H. Fathy 74'; Hegazi (yellow card) 85' | Report | Ditshupo (yellow card) 32'; Kobe (yellow card) 70'; Gaolaolwe (yellow card) 90' | Stadium: Borg El Arab Stadium; Referee: Ibrahim Nour El Din (Egypt) |

| 7 November 2019 International Friendly | Egypt | 1–0 | Liberia | Alexandria, Egypt |
| 18:00 CAT (UTC+2) | M. Hamdy (yellow card) 77'; H. Fathy 84' | Report | Jackson (yellow card) 33' (yellow-red card) 86'; Doe (yellow card) 37'; Benaiah (yellow card) 73'; Vaikainah (yellow card) 76' | Stadium: Borg El Arab Stadium; Referee: Ahmed El Ghandour (Egypt) |

===== 2019 Africa Cup of Nations =====
====== Group A ======
| Pos | Team | Pld | W | D | L | GF | GA | GD | Pts | Qualification |
|---|---|---|---|---|---|---|---|---|---|---|
| 1 | Egypt (H) | 3 | 3 | 0 | 0 | 5 | 0 | +5 | 9 | Advance to knockout stage |
| 2 | Uganda | 3 | 1 | 1 | 1 | 3 | 3 | 0 | 4 | Advance to knockout stage |
| 3 | DR Congo | 3 | 1 | 0 | 2 | 4 | 4 | 0 | 3 | Advance to knockout stage |
| 4 | Zimbabwe | 3 | 0 | 1 | 2 | 1 | 6 | −5 | 1 | |

Source: CAF
Rules for classification: Tiebreakers
(H) Hosts

| 21 June 2019 Group A | Egypt | 1–0 | Zimbabwe | Cairo, Egypt |
| 22:00 CAT (UTC+2) | Trézéguet 41' | Report | Chawapiwa (yellow card) 88' | Stadium: Cairo International Stadium; Attendance: 73,299; Referee: Sidi Alioum (Cameroon) |

| 26 June 2019 Group A | Egypt | 2–0 | DR Congo | Cairo, Egypt |
| 22:00 CAT (UTC+2) | A. El Mohamady 25'; Salah 43'; El Neny (yellow card) 68'; Alaa (yellow card) 81'; Ghazal (yellow card) 87' | Report | Bokadi (yellow card) 30'; Muzinga (yellow card) 59' | Stadium: Cairo International Stadium; Attendance: 74,219; Referee: Victor Gomes (South Africa) |

| 30 June 2019 Group A | Uganda | 0–2 | Egypt | Cairo, Egypt |
| 21:00 CAT (UTC+2) | Kyambadde (yellow card) 59'; Lwanga (yellow card) 89' | Report | Salah 36'; A. El Mohamady 45+1', (yellow card) 61' | Stadium: Cairo International Stadium; Attendance: 74,566; Referee: Maguette N'Diaye (Senegal) |

====== Knockout stage ======
| 6 July 2019 Round of 16 | Egypt | 0–1 | South Africa | Cairo, Egypt |
| 21:00 CAT (UTC+2) | Ashraf (yellow card) 68' | Report | Hlanti (yellow card) 44'; Zungu (yellow card) 79'; Lorch 85'; Hlatshwayo (yellow card) 90+4' | Stadium: Cairo International Stadium; Attendance: 75,000; Referee: Eric Otogo-Castane (Gabon) |

===== 2021 Africa Cup of Nations qualification =====
====== Group G ======
| Pos | Team | Pld | W | D | L | GF | GA | GD | Pts | Qualification | Egypt | Comoros | Kenya | Togo |
|---|---|---|---|---|---|---|---|---|---|---|---|---|---|---|
| 1 | Egypt | 6 | 3 | 3 | 0 | 10 | 3 | +7 | 12 | Final tournament | — | 4–0 | 1–1 | 1–0 |
| 2 | Comoros | 6 | 2 | 3 | 1 | 4 | 6 | −2 | 9 | Final tournament | 0–0 | — | 2–1 | 0–0 |
| 3 | Kenya | 6 | 1 | 4 | 1 | 7 | 7 | 0 | 7 | | 1–1 | 1–1 | — | 1–1 |
| 4 | Togo | 6 | 0 | 2 | 4 | 3 | 8 | −5 | 2 | | 1–3 | 0–1 | 1–2 | — |

Source: CAF
Rules for classification: Tiebreakers

| 14 November 2019 Group G | Egypt | 1–1 | Kenya | Alexandria, Egypt |
| 18:00 CAT (UTC+2) | Alaa (yellow card) 40'; Kahraba 42' | Report | Juma (yellow card) 49'; Olunga 67'; Olwande (yellow card) 90+3' | Stadium: Borg El Arab Stadium; Referee: Sidi Alioum (Cameroon) |

| 18 November 2019 Group G | Comoros | 0–0 | Egypt | Moroni, Comoros |
| 16:00 EAT (UTC+3) | Bachirou (yellow card) 49'; Abdou (yellow card) 56' | Report | Kahraba (yellow card) 10'; Ashraf (yellow card) 26'; El Shahat (yellow card) 82'; El Solia (yellow card) 90+3' | Stadium: Stade Omnisports de Malouzini; Referee: Bienvenu Sinko (Ivory Coast) |

=== Egypt national under-23 football team ===
==== Results and fixtures ====
===== Friendlies =====
| 7 September 2019 International Friendly | Egypt | 4–1 | Saudi Arabia | Suez, Egypt |
| 20:00 CAT (UTC+2) | Taher 3' (pen.); Ramadan 13' (pen.); Abou El Fotouh 26'; A. Hamdy (yellow card) 36'; S. Mohsen 49' | Report | Al Amri 30' | Stadium: Suez Stadium; Referee: Ahmed El Ghandour (Egypt) |

| 10 September 2019 International Friendly | Egypt | 1–0 | Saudi Arabia | Cairo, Egypt |
| 19:00 CAT (UTC+2) | Galal 6'; Abou El Fotouh (yellow card) 26' | Report | Al Shamlan (yellow card) 26'; Al Omran (yellow card) 45+2' | Stadium: Petro Sport Stadium; Referee: Amin Omar (Egypt) |

| 11 October 2019 International Friendly | Egypt | 1–1 | South Africa | Ismailia, Egypt |
| 20:00 CAT (UTC+2) | Rayyan 10' | Report | Malepe 16' (pen.) | Stadium: Ismailia Stadium; Referee: Mohamed Maarouf (Egypt) |

| 13 October 2019 International Friendly | Egypt | 1–0 | South Africa | Cairo, Egypt |
| 20:00 CAT (UTC+2) | Ramadan (yellow card) 9', (goal) 29' (pen.); Ashour (yellow card) 90+1' | Report | Ngezana (yellow card) 71' | Stadium: Cairo International Stadium; Referee: Mahmoud El Banna (Egypt) |

===== 2019 Africa U-23 Cup of Nations =====
====== Group A ======
| Pos | Team | Pld | W | D | L | GF | GA | GD | Pts | Qualification |
|---|---|---|---|---|---|---|---|---|---|---|
| 1 | Egypt (H) | 3 | 3 | 0 | 0 | 6 | 3 | +3 | 9 | Advance to knockout stage |
| 2 | Ghana | 3 | 1 | 1 | 1 | 5 | 4 | +1 | 4 | Advance to knockout stage |
| 3 | Cameroon | 3 | 1 | 1 | 1 | 3 | 3 | 0 | 4 | |
| 4 | Mali | 3 | 0 | 0 | 3 | 0 | 4 | −4 | 0 | |

Source: CAF
Rules for classification: Group stage tiebreakers
(H) Hosts

| 8 November 2019 Group A | Egypt | 1–0 | Mali | Cairo, Egypt |
| 19:00 CAT (UTC+2) | Mostafa 29'; A. Hamdy (yellow card) 84' | Report | Kanoute (yellow card) 35' | Stadium: Cairo International Stadium; Referee: Georges Gatogato (Burundi) |

| 11 November 2019 Group A | Ghana | 2–3 | Egypt | Cairo, Egypt |
| 20:00 CAT (UTC+2) | Yeboah 6'; Fobi (yellow card) 33'; Obeng 46'; Baah (yellow card) 70' | Report | A. Hamdy (yellow card) 16'; Mostafa 17'; Ramadan 82'; Rayyan 88' | Stadium: Cairo International Stadium; Referee: Daouda Guèye (Senegal) |

| 14 November 2019 Group A | Egypt | 2–1 | Cameroon | Cairo, Egypt |
| 20:00 CAT (UTC+2) | Galal (yellow card) 17'; Mostafa 28', 51'; Ramadan (yellow card) 61' | Report | Ayuk 38'; Tchamba (yellow card) 48'; Zobo (yellow card) 90+1' | Stadium: Cairo International Stadium; Referee: Andofetra Rakotojaona (Madagascar) |

====== Knockout stage ======
| 19 November 2019 Semi-finals | Egypt | 3–0 | South Africa | Cairo, Egypt |
| 20:00 CAT (UTC+2) | Ramadan 59' (pen.); Abdel Salam (yellow card) 72'; Magdy 84', 89' | Report | Mahlatsi (yellow card) 51'; Mukumela (yellow card) 58'; Malepe (yellow card) 85' | Stadium: Cairo International Stadium; Referee: Daouda Guèye (Senegal) |

| 22 November 2019 Final | Egypt | 2–1 (a.e.t.) | Ivory Coast | Cairo, Egypt |
| 20:00 CAT (UTC+2) | El Eraky 37', (yellow card) 37'; Abou El Fotouh (yellow card) 87'; Ramadan 114', (yellow card) 116' | Report | Lazare (yellow card) 50'; Dakoi (yellow card) 77'; Doumbia 89'; Dabila (yellow card) 118' | Stadium: Cairo International Stadium; Referee: Andofetra Rakotojaona (Madagascar) |

=== Egypt women's national under-20 football team ===
==== Results and fixtures ====
===== 2020 FIFA U-20 Women's World Cup qualification =====
====== Preliminary round ======
| 17 January 2020 First leg | Egypt | 3–5 | Morocco | Cairo, Egypt |
| 14:30 CAT (UTC+2) | Ghazi 32' (pen.); Emad 52'; Nada 66' | Report | Barchi 6'; Redouani 37' (pen.); Brima 38'; Banouk 50'; Ahmamou 90' | Stadium: Petro Sport Stadium; Referee: Lamia Atman (Algeria) |

| 2 February 2020 Second leg | Morocco | 3–1 (8–4 agg.) | Egypt | Salé, Morocco |
| 14:30 WAT (UTC+1) | Ahmamou 5', 50'; Tayar 37' | Report | Ghazi 72' | Stadium: Stade Boubker Ammar; Referee: Dorsaf Ganouati (Tunisia) |

== CAF competitions ==
=== CAF Champions League ===
==== Preliminary round ====
| Team 1 | Agg. | Team 2 | 1st leg | 2nd leg |
|---|---|---|---|---|
| Atlabara (South Sudan) | 0–13 | (Egypt) Al Ahly | 0–4 | 0–9 |
| Dekedaha (Somalia) | 0–13 | (Egypt) Zamalek | 0–7 | 0–6 |

==== First round ====
| Team 1 | Agg. | Team 2 | 1st leg | 2nd leg |
|---|---|---|---|---|
| Cano Sport (Equatorial Guinea) | 0–6 | (Egypt) Al Ahly | 0–2 | 0–4 |
| Génération Foot (Senegal) | 2–2 (a) | (Egypt) Zamalek | 2–1 | 0–1 |

==== Group stage ====
===== Group A =====
| Pos | Team | Pld | W | D | L | GF | GA | GD | Pts | Qualification | TPM | ZAM | AGO | ZES |
|---|---|---|---|---|---|---|---|---|---|---|---|---|---|---|
| 1 | (Democratic Republic of the Congo) TP Mazembe | 6 | 4 | 2 | 0 | 11 | 4 | +7 | 14 | Advance to knockout stage | — | 3–0 | 2–1 | 3–1 |
| 2 | (Egypt) Zamalek | 6 | 2 | 3 | 1 | 5 | 4 | +1 | 9 | Advance to knockout stage | 0–0 | — | 2–0 | 2–0 |
| 3 | (Angola) 1º de Agosto | 6 | 0 | 4 | 2 | 4 | 7 | −3 | 4 | | 1–1 | 0–0 | — | 1–1 |
| 4 | (Zambia) ZESCO United | 6 | 0 | 3 | 3 | 5 | 10 | −5 | 3 | | 1–2 | 1–1 | 1–1 | — |

Source: CAF

===== Group B =====
| Pos | Team | Pld | W | D | L | GF | GA | GD | Pts | Qualification | ESS | AHL | HIL | PLA |
|---|---|---|---|---|---|---|---|---|---|---|---|---|---|---|
| 1 | (Tunisia) Étoile du Sahel | 6 | 4 | 0 | 2 | 8 | 3 | +5 | 12 | Advance to knockout stage | — | 1–0 | 0–1 | 2–0 |
| 2 | (Egypt) Al-Ahly | 6 | 3 | 2 | 1 | 7 | 4 | +3 | 11 | Advance to knockout stage | 1–0 | — | 2–1 | 2–0 |
| 3 | (Sudan) Al-Hilal | 6 | 3 | 1 | 2 | 7 | 6 | +1 | 10 | | 1–2 | 1–1 | — | 2–1 |
| 4 | (Zimbabwe) FC Platinum | 6 | 0 | 1 | 5 | 2 | 11 | −9 | 1 | | 0–3 | 1–1 | 0–1 | — |

Source: CAF

==== Quarter-finals ====
| Team 1 | Agg. | Team 2 | 1st leg | 2nd leg |
|---|---|---|---|---|
| Al Ahly (Egypt) | 3–1 | (South Africa) Mamelodi Sundowns | 2–0 | 1–1 |
| Zamalek (Egypt) | 3–2 | (Tunisia) Espérance de Tunis | 3–1 | 0–1 |

==== Semi-finals ====
| Team 1 | Agg. | Team 2 | 1st leg | 2nd leg |
|---|---|---|---|---|
| Raja Casablanca (Morocco) | 1–4 | (Egypt) Zamalek | 0–1 | 1–3 |
| Wydad Casablanca (Morocco) | 1–5 | (Egypt) Al Ahly | 0–2 | 1–3 |

==== Final ====
27 November 2020
19:00 (21:00 UTC+2)

| Zamalek (Egypt) | 1–2 | (Egypt) Al Ahly |
|---|---|---|
| Shikabala 31' | Report | El Solia 5'; Afsha 86' |

Cairo International Stadium, Cairo
Attendance: 0 (Note: The match was played behind closed doors due to the COVID-19 pandemic in Africa.)
Referee: Mustapha Ghorbal (Algeria)

=== CAF Confederation Cup ===
==== Preliminary round ====
| Team 1 | Agg. | Team 2 | 1st leg | 2nd leg |
|---|---|---|---|---|
| Pyramids (Egypt) | 5–1 | (Republic of the Congo) Étoile du Congo | 4–1 | 1–0 |

==== First round ====
| Team 1 | Agg. | Team 2 | 1st leg | 2nd leg |
|---|---|---|---|---|
| Malindi (Zanzibar) | 2–7 | (Egypt) Al Masry | 1–4 | 1–3 |
| Pyramids (Egypt) | 2–1 | (Algeria) CR Belouizdad | 1–1 | 1–0 |

==== Play-off round ====
| Team 1 | Agg. | Team 2 | 1st leg | 2nd leg |
|---|---|---|---|---|
| Young Africans (Tanzania) | 1–5 | (Egypt) Pyramids | 1–2 | 0–3 |
| Côte d'Or (Seychelles) | 0–6 | (Egypt) Al Masry | 0–4 | 0–2 |

==== Group stage ====
===== Group A =====
| Pos | Team | Pld | W | D | L | GF | GA | GD | Pts | Qualification | PYR | MAS | RAN | FCN |
|---|---|---|---|---|---|---|---|---|---|---|---|---|---|---|
| 1 | (Egypt) Pyramids | 6 | 5 | 0 | 1 | 14 | 3 | +11 | 15 | Advance to knockout stage | — | 2–0 | 0–1 | 6–0 |
| 2 | (Egypt) Al-Masry | 6 | 3 | 1 | 2 | 10 | 9 | +1 | 10 | Advance to knockout stage | 1–2 | — | 4–2 | 1–0 |
| 3 | (Nigeria) Enugu Rangers | 6 | 1 | 3 | 2 | 6 | 9 | −3 | 6 | | 1–3 | 1–1 | — | 1–1 |
| 4 | (Mauritania) FC Nouadhibou | 6 | 0 | 2 | 4 | 3 | 12 | −9 | 2 | | 0–1 | 2–3 | 0–0 | — |

Source: CAF

| Pos | Team | Pld | W | D | L | GF | GA | GD | Pts | Qualification | PYR | MAS | RAN | FCN |
|---|---|---|---|---|---|---|---|---|---|---|---|---|---|---|
| 1 | (Egypt) Pyramids | 6 | 5 | 0 | 1 | 14 | 3 | +11 | 15 | Advance to knockout stage | — | 2–0 | 0–1 | 6–0 |
| 2 | (Egypt) Al-Masry | 6 | 3 | 1 | 2 | 10 | 9 | +1 | 10 | Advance to knockout stage | 1–2 | — | 4–2 | 1–0 |
| 3 | (Nigeria) Enugu Rangers | 6 | 1 | 3 | 2 | 6 | 9 | −3 | 6 | | 1–3 | 1–1 | — | 1–1 |
| 4 | (Mauritania) FC Nouadhibou | 6 | 0 | 2 | 4 | 3 | 12 | −9 | 2 | | 0–1 | 2–3 | 0–0 | — |

Source: CAF

==== Quarter-finals ====
| Team 1 | Agg. | Team 2 | 1st leg | 2nd leg |
|---|---|---|---|---|
| Zanaco (Zambia) | 1–3 | (Egypt) Pyramids | 0–3 | 1–0 |
| Al Masry (Egypt) | 2–3 | (Morocco) RS Berkane | 2–2 | 0–1 |

==== Semi-finals ====
| Team 1 | Score | Team 2 |
|---|---|---|
| Pyramids (Egypt) | 2–0 | (Guinea) Horoya |

==== Final ====
25 October 2020
19:00 (20:00 UTC+1)

| Pyramids (Egypt) | 0–1 | (Morocco) RS Berkane |
|---|---|---|
| | Report | Dayo 15' |

Prince Moulay Abdellah Stadium, Rabat
Attendance: 0 (Note: Final match played behind closed doors due to the COVID-19 pandemic in Morocco.)
Referee: Sidi Alioum (Cameroon)

=== CAF Super Cup ===
14 February 2020
16:00 (19:00 UTC+3)

| Espérance de Tunis (Tunisia) | 1–3 | (Egypt) Zamalek |
|---|---|---|
| Benguit 54' (pen.) | Report (Soccerway) | Obama 2'; Bencharki 58', 90+5' |

Thani bin Jassim Stadium, Doha (Qatar)
Attendance: 19,398
Referee: Victor Gomes (South Africa)

== UAFA competitions ==
=== Arab Club Champions Cup ===
==== First round ====
| Team 1 | Agg. | Team 2 | 1st leg | 2nd leg |
|---|---|---|---|---|
| Ismaily (Egypt) | 4–3 | (Libya) Al Ahly Benghazi | 4–2 | 0–1 |
| Al Arabi (Kuwait) | 0–3 | (Egypt) Al Ittihad | 0–1 | 0–2 |

==== Second round ====
| Team 1 | Agg. | Team 2 | 1st leg | 2nd leg |
|---|---|---|---|---|
| Al Ittihad (Egypt) | 3–0 | (Bahrain) Al Muharraq | 2–0 | 1–0 |
| Ismaily (Egypt) | 4–0 | (United Arab Emirates) Al Jazira | 2–0 | 2–0 |

==== Quarter-finals ====
| Team 1 | Agg. | Team 2 | 1st leg | 2nd leg |
|---|---|---|---|---|
| Al Ittihad (Egypt) | 0–1 | (Egypt) Ismaily | 0–1 | 0–0 |

==== Semi-finals ====
| Team 1 | Agg. | Team 2 | 1st leg | 2nd leg |
|---|---|---|---|---|
| Ismaily (Egypt) | 1–3 | (Morocco) Raja Casablanca | 1–0 | 0–3 |

== Men's football ==
=== Egyptian Premier League ===
| Pos | Team | Pld | W | D | L | GF | GA | GD | Pts | Qualification or relegation |
|---|---|---|---|---|---|---|---|---|---|---|
| 1 | Al Ahly (C) | 34 | 28 | 5 | 1 | 74 | 8 | +66 | 89 | Qualification for the Champions League |
| 2 | Zamalek | 34 | 21 | 8 | 5 | 50 | 27 | +23 | 68 (Note: As a result of Zamalek refusing to play their away fixture against Al Ahly on 24 February 2020, the club was subject to a 3-point deduction following the conclusion of the season.) | Qualification for the Champions League |
| 3 | Pyramids | 34 | 19 | 8 | 7 | 54 | 33 | +21 | 65 | Qualification for the Confederation Cup (Note: Since the 2019–20 Egypt Cup wouldn't finish by the CAF deadline, the spot awarded to the Egypt Cup winners (Confederation Cup preliminary or first round) was passed to the fourth-placed team, Al Mokawloon Al Arab.) |
| 4 | Al Mokawloon Al Arab | 34 | 15 | 9 | 10 | 45 | 34 | +11 | 54 | Qualification for the Confederation Cup |
| 5 | Smouha | 34 | 11 | 18 | 5 | 44 | 33 | +11 | 51 | |
| 6 | ENPPI | 34 | 12 | 12 | 10 | 34 | 33 | +1 | 48 (Note: Head-to-head points: ENPPI 4, Al Masry 1.) | |
| 7 | Al Masry | 34 | 13 | 9 | 12 | 36 | 35 | +1 | 48 | |
| 8 | El Entag El Harby | 34 | 11 | 11 | 12 | 35 | 38 | −3 | 44 | |
| 9 | Misr Lel Makkasa | 34 | 10 | 12 | 12 | 40 | 39 | +1 | 42 (Note: Tied on head-to-head points (3). Head-to-head goal difference: Misr Lel Makkasa +1, Al Ittihad –1.) | |
| 10 | Al Ittihad | 34 | 9 | 15 | 10 | 36 | 36 | 0 | 42 | |
| 11 | Ismaily | 34 | 11 | 8 | 15 | 38 | 48 | −10 | 41 (Note: Head-to-head points: Ismaily 6, Tala'ea El Gaish 0.) | |
| 12 | Tala'ea El Gaish | 34 | 9 | 14 | 11 | 32 | 37 | −5 | 41 | |
| 13 | El Gouna | 34 | 10 | 7 | 17 | 32 | 45 | −13 | 37 (Note: Head-to-head points: El Gouna 4, Aswan 1.) | |
| 14 | Aswan | 34 | 9 | 10 | 15 | 39 | 50 | −11 | 37 | |
| 15 | Wadi Degla | 34 | 8 | 11 | 15 | 32 | 43 | −11 | 35 | |
| 16 | Haras El Hodoud (R) | 34 | 7 | 12 | 15 | 31 | 41 | −10 | 33 | Relegation to the Second Division |
| 17 | Tanta (R) | 34 | 3 | 13 | 18 | 22 | 55 | −33 | 22 | Relegation to the Second Division |
| 18 | FC Masr (R) | 34 | 3 | 12 | 19 | 18 | 57 | −39 | 21 | Relegation to the Second Division |

Source: Soccerway
Rules for classification: 1) Points; 2) Head-to-Head points; 3) Head-to-Head goal difference; 4) Head-to-Head goals scored; 5) Head-to-Head away goals scored; 6) Goal difference; 7) Goals scored.
(Note: Head-to-head record is used only after all the matches between the teams in question have been played).
(C) Champions; (R) Relegated

=== Egyptian Second Division ===
==== Group A ====
| Pos | Team | Pld | W | D | L | GF | GA | GD | Pts | Promotion, qualification or relegation |
|---|---|---|---|---|---|---|---|---|---|---|
| 1 | National Bank of Egypt (C, P) | 22 | 12 | 8 | 2 | 29 | 12 | +17 | 44 (Note: Head-to-head points: National Bank of Egypt 6, Beni Suef 0.) | Promotion to the Premier League |
| 2 | Beni Suef | 22 | 13 | 5 | 4 | 31 | 12 | +19 | 44 | |
| 3 | Al Aluminium | 22 | 13 | 4 | 5 | 33 | 17 | +16 | 43 | |
| 4 | Muslim Youths (Qena) | 22 | 9 | 8 | 5 | 18 | 19 | −1 | 35 | |
| 5 | Asyut Petroleum | 22 | 9 | 6 | 7 | 25 | 24 | +1 | 33 | |
| 6 | El Minya | 22 | 9 | 5 | 8 | 29 | 23 | +6 | 32 | |
| 7 | Telephonat Beni Suef | 22 | 7 | 9 | 6 | 22 | 21 | +1 | 30 | |
| 8 | Sohag | 22 | 7 | 7 | 8 | 18 | 17 | +1 | 28 | Reprieved from relegation to the Third Division (Note: The EFA announced on 26 October 2020 that there would be no relegation in the Second Division and the Third Division for the 2019–20 season due to the impacts caused by the COVID-19 pandemic in Egypt.) |
| 9 | Media | 22 | 5 | 7 | 10 | 20 | 32 | −12 | 22 | Reprieved from relegation to the Third Division |
| 10 | Faiyum | 22 | 6 | 3 | 13 | 18 | 25 | −7 | 21 | Reprieved from relegation to the Third Division |
| 11 | Dayrout | 22 | 4 | 3 | 15 | 21 | 42 | −21 | 15 | Reprieved from relegation to the Third Division |
| 12 | Tahta | 22 | 2 | 7 | 13 | 16 | 36 | −20 | 13 | Reprieved from relegation to the Third Division |

Source: Kooora
Rules for classification: 1) Points; 2) Head-to-Head points; 3) Head-to-Head goal difference; 4) Head-to-Head goals scored; 5) Head-to-Head away goals scored; 6) Goal difference; 7) Goals scored; 8) Draw of lots (only if needed to decide teams for promotion or teams for relegation).
(Note: Head-to-head record is used only after all the matches between the teams in question have been played).
(C) Champions; (P) Promoted

==== Group B ====
| Pos | Team | Pld | W | D | L | GF | GA | GD | Pts | Promotion, qualification or relegation |
|---|---|---|---|---|---|---|---|---|---|---|
| 1 | Ceramica Cleopatra (C, P) | 22 | 11 | 10 | 1 | 29 | 13 | +16 | 43 | Promotion to the Premier League |
| 2 | Petrojet | 22 | 12 | 6 | 4 | 22 | 10 | +12 | 42 | |
| 3 | El Dakhleya | 22 | 11 | 8 | 3 | 32 | 16 | +16 | 41 | |
| 4 | El Qanah | 22 | 8 | 9 | 5 | 20 | 16 | +4 | 33 (Note: Head-to-head points: El Qanah 6, Suez 5, Al Nasr 4.) | |
| 5 | Suez | 22 | 8 | 9 | 5 | 18 | 14 | +4 | 33 | |
| 6 | Al Nasr | 22 | 9 | 6 | 7 | 27 | 22 | +5 | 33 | |
| 7 | Gomhoriat Shebin | 22 | 5 | 11 | 6 | 12 | 11 | +1 | 26 | |
| 8 | Nogoom | 22 | 6 | 7 | 9 | 25 | 24 | +1 | 25 | Reprieved from relegation to the Third Division (Note: The EFA announced on 26 October 2020 that there would be no relegation in the Second Division and the Third Division for the 2019–20 season due to the impacts caused by the COVID-19 pandemic in Egypt.) |
| 9 | Al Merreikh | 22 | 4 | 9 | 9 | 22 | 33 | −11 | 21 | Reprieved from relegation to the Third Division |
| 10 | Coca-Cola | 22 | 4 | 8 | 10 | 16 | 28 | −12 | 20 | Reprieved from relegation to the Third Division |
| 11 | Tersana | 22 | 3 | 8 | 11 | 13 | 30 | −17 | 17 | Reprieved from relegation to the Third Division |
| 12 | Al Zarka | 22 | 2 | 7 | 13 | 15 | 34 | −19 | 13 | Reprieved from relegation to the Third Division |

Source: Kooora
Rules for classification: 1) Points; 2) Head-to-Head points; 3) Head-to-Head goal difference; 4) Head-to-Head goals scored; 5) Head-to-Head away goals scored; 6) Goal difference; 7) Goals scored; 8) Draw of lots (only if needed to decide teams for promotion or teams for relegation).
(Note: Head-to-head record is used only after all the matches between the teams in question have been played).
(C) Champions; (P) Promoted

==== Group C ====
| Pos | Team | Pld | W | D | L | GF | GA | GD | Pts | Promotion, qualification or relegation |
|---|---|---|---|---|---|---|---|---|---|---|
| 1 | Ghazl El Mahalla (C, P) | 22 | 14 | 5 | 3 | 32 | 11 | +21 | 47 | Promotion to the Premier League |
| 2 | Pharco | 22 | 12 | 9 | 1 | 28 | 10 | +18 | 45 | |
| 3 | Dikernis | 22 | 10 | 7 | 5 | 27 | 17 | +10 | 37 (Note: Tied on head-to-head points (3), on head-to-head goal difference (0), on head-to-head goals scored (2) and on head-to-head away goals scored (2). Overall goal difference: Dikernis +10, Ala'ab Damanhour +4.) | |
| 4 | Ala'ab Damanhour | 22 | 11 | 4 | 7 | 28 | 24 | +4 | 37 | |
| 5 | El Mansoura | 22 | 9 | 8 | 5 | 25 | 21 | +4 | 35 | |
| 6 | Abou Qir Fertilizers | 22 | 9 | 6 | 7 | 28 | 17 | +11 | 33 | |
| 7 | El Raja | 22 | 8 | 7 | 7 | 32 | 29 | +3 | 31 | |
| 8 | Al Hammam | 22 | 8 | 6 | 8 | 25 | 28 | −3 | 30 | Reprieved from relegation to the Third Division (Note: The EFA announced on 26 October 2020 that there would be no relegation in the Second Division and the Third Division for the 2019–20 season due to the impacts caused by the COVID-19 pandemic in Egypt.) |
| 9 | Olympic Club | 22 | 7 | 6 | 9 | 20 | 18 | +2 | 27 | Reprieved from relegation to the Third Division |
| 10 | Baladeyet El Mahalla | 22 | 7 | 4 | 11 | 25 | 32 | −7 | 25 | Reprieved from relegation to the Third Division |
| 11 | Maleyat Kafr El Zayat | 22 | 1 | 5 | 16 | 19 | 40 | −21 | 8 | Reprieved from relegation to the Third Division |
| 12 | Biyala | 22 | 0 | 5 | 17 | 10 | 52 | −42 | 5 | Reprieved from relegation to the Third Division |

Source: Kooora
Rules for classification: 1) Points; 2) Head-to-Head points; 3) Head-to-Head goal difference; 4) Head-to-Head goals scored; 5) Head-to-Head away goals scored; 6) Goal difference; 7) Goals scored; 8) Draw of lots (only if needed to decide teams for promotion or teams for relegation).
(Note: Head-to-head record is used only after all the matches between the teams in question have been played).
(C) Champions; (P) Promoted

=== Cup competitions ===
==== Egypt Cup ====
===== Final =====
5 December 2020
20:00 CAT

| Al Ahly | 1–1 (a.e.t.) | Tala'ea El Gaish |
|---|---|---|
| Kahraba 65' | Report | Mansi 90+2' |
Penalties
| Maâloul (penalty scored); El Solia (penalty scored); Benoun (penalty scored); Ashraf (penalty missed); Afsha (penalty missed) | 3–2 | (penalty scored) Mohareb; (penalty missed) Mansi; (penalty missed) Sotohi; (penalty scored) M. Gamal; (penalty missed) El Sayed |

Borg El Arab Stadium, Alexandria
Referee: Mohamed El Hanafy

==== Egyptian Super Cup ====
20 February 2020
21:00 GST (UTC+4)

| Al Ahly | 0–0 | Zamalek |
|---|---|---|
| | Report |
Penalties
| Maâloul (penalty scored); El Solia (penalty scored); Metwalli (penalty scored); Hany (penalty missed); Badji (penalty missed) | 3–4 | (penalty scored) Alaa; (penalty scored) Sassi; (penalty missed) Bencharki; (penalty scored) Hamed; (penalty scored) Gomaa |

Mohammed bin Zayed Stadium, Abu Dhabi
Attendance: 33,790
Referee: Svein Oddvar Moen (Norway)

== Notable deaths ==
- 11 November 2019: Alaa Ali, 31, Zamalek, Telephonat Beni Suef, Smouha, Tala'ea El Gaish, Wadi Degla, Al Masry and Petrojet attacking midfielder/winger.
- 23 February 2020: Amr Fahmy, 36, former CAF Secretary General.
- 29 February 2020: Mohamed El Essawy, 19, Egypt U20 and Ghazl El Mahalla defensive midfielder.
