= 2019–20 CAF Confederation Cup group stage =

- Dates: 1 December 2019 – 2 February 2020

Tournament statistics
- Matches played: 48
- Goals scored: 107 (2.23 per match)

The 2019–20 CAF Confederation Cup group stage started on 1 December 2019 and ended on 2 February 2020. A total of 16 teams competed in the group stage to decide the eight places in the knockout stage of the 2019–20 CAF Confederation Cup.

== Draw ==
The draw for the group stage was held on 12 November 2019, 12:00 CAT (UTC+2), at the CAF headquarters in Cairo, Egypt. The 16 teams, all winners of the play-off round of qualifying, were drawn into four groups of four.

The teams were seeded by their performances in the CAF competitions for the previous five seasons (CAF 5-year ranking points shown in parentheses). Each group contained one team from Pot 1, one team from Pot 2 and two teams from Pot 3, and each team was drawn into one of the positions in their group.

Pot	Pot 1	Pot 2	Pot 3
Teams	(Guinea) Horoya (30 pts); (Morocco) RS Berkane (28 pts); (Nigeria) Enyimba (16 pts); (Egypt) Al-Masry (12 pts)	(Morocco) Hassania Agadir (10 pts); (Zambia) Zanaco (6 pts); (Nigeria) Enugu Rangers (5 pts); (Mali) Djoliba (2 pts)	(Algeria) Paradou AC; (Benin) ESAE; (Democratic Republic of the Congo) DC Motema Pembe; (Egypt) Pyramids; (Ivory Coast) FC San Pédro; (Libya) Al-Nasr; (Mauritania) FC Nouadhibou; (South Africa) Bidvest Wits

== Format ==
In each group, teams play against each other home-and-away in a round-robin format. The group winners and runners-up advance to the quarter-finals of the knockout stage.

=== Tiebreakers ===
Teams are ranked according to points (3 points for a win, 1 point for a draw, 0 points for a loss). If tied on points, tiebreakers are applied in the following order (Regulations III. 20 & 21):

1. Points in head-to-head matches among tied teams;
2. Goal difference in head-to-head matches among tied teams;
3. Goals scored in head-to-head matches among tied teams;
4. Away goals scored in head-to-head matches among tied teams;
5. If more than two teams are tied, and after applying all head-to-head criteria above, a subset of teams are still tied, all head-to-head criteria above are reapplied exclusively to this subset of teams;
6. Goal difference in all group matches;
7. Goals scored in all group matches;
8. Away goals scored in all group matches;
9. Drawing of lots.

== Schedule ==
The schedule of each matchday is as follows. Effective from the Confederation Cup group stage, matches are played on Sundays. Kick-off times are fixed at 13:00, 16:00 and 19:00 GMT.

Note: Positions for scheduling do not use the seeding pots, e.g. Team 1 is not necessarily the team from Pot 1 in the draw.

Matchday	Dates		Matches
Matchday	Original dates	Revised dates	Matches
Matchday 1	1 December 2019		Team 1 vs. Team 4, Team 2 vs. Team 3
Matchday 2	8 December 2019		Team 3 vs. Team 1, Team 4 vs. Team 2
Matchday 3	29 December 2019		Team 4 vs. Team 3, Team 1 vs. Team 2
Matchday 4	16 February 2020	12 January 2020	Team 3 vs. Team 4, Team 2 vs. Team 1
Matchday 5	23 February 2020	26 January 2020	Team 4 vs. Team 1, Team 3 vs. Team 2
Matchday 6	8 March 2020	2 February 2020	Team 1 vs. Team 3, Team 2 vs. Team 4

== Groups ==
Times are GMT as listed by CAF (local times, even if not different, are in parentheses).

=== Group A ===
Pos	Team	Pld	W	D	L	GF	GA	GD	Pts	Qualification	PYR	MAS	RAN	FCN
1	(Egypt) Pyramids	6	5	0	1	14	3	+11	15	Advance to knockout stage	—	2–0	0–1	6–0
2	(Egypt) Al-Masry	6	3	1	2	10	9	+1	10	Advance to knockout stage	1–2	—	4–2	1–0
3	(Nigeria) Enugu Rangers	6	1	3	2	6	9	−3	6		1–3	1–1	—	1–1
4	(Mauritania) FC Nouadhibou	6	0	2	4	3	12	−9	2		0–1	2–3	0–0	—

Source: CAF
Rules for classification: Tiebreakers
1 December 2019
13:00 (14:00 UTC+1)

Enugu Rangers (Nigeria)	1–3	(Egypt) Pyramids
Olawoyin 28'	Report	Farouk 54' (pen.); Layouni 83'; Issa 87' (pen.)

Nnamdi Azikiwe Stadium, Enugu
Referee: Souleiman Ahmed Djama (Djibouti)
1 December 2019
19:00 (19:00 UTC+0)

FC Nouadhibou (Mauritania)	2–3	(Egypt) Al-Masry
Bagili 46'; El Welly 55'	Report	Amutu 20', 63'; El Eraky 90+1'

Stade Cheikha Ould Boïdiya, Nouakchott
Referee: Boubou Traoré (Mali)

8 December 2019
16:00 (18:00 UTC+2)

Al-Masry (Egypt)	4–2	(Nigeria) Enugu Rangers
Amutu 5'; Yasser 27'; Taktak 48'; Ali 83'	Report	Chinonso 86'; Simporé 90' (o.g.)

Alexandria Stadium, Alexandria (Note: Al-Masry played their group stage home matches at Alexandria Stadium, Alexandria, instead of their regular home stadium Al Masry Club Stadium, Port Said, which is undergoing renovation.)
Referee: El Fadil Mohamed (Sudan)
8 December 2019
19:00 (21:00 UTC+2)

Pyramids (Egypt)	6–0	(Mauritania) FC Nouadhibou
Farouk 10', 56'; Traoré 32', 84'; Antwi 52'; Kanon 75'	Report

30 June Stadium, Cairo
Referee: Hassan Corneh (Liberia)

29 December 2019
16:00 (18:00 UTC+2)

Al-Masry (Egypt)	1–2	(Egypt) Pyramids
Simporé 72' (pen.)	Report	Antwi 54'; El Gabbas 83'

Alexandria Stadium, Alexandria
Referee: Haythem Guirat (Tunisia)
29 December 2019
19:00 (19:00 UTC+0)

FC Nouadhibou (Mauritania)	0–0	(Nigeria) Enugu Rangers
	Report

Stade Cheikha Ould Boïdiya, Nouakchott
Referee: Daniel Laryea (Ghana)

12 January 2020
16:00 (17:00 UTC+1)

Enugu Rangers (Nigeria)	1–1	(Mauritania) FC Nouadhibou
Olawoyin 68' (pen.)	Report	El Welly 23'

Nnamdi Azikiwe Stadium, Enugu
Referee: Adissa Ligali (Benin)
12 January 2020
16:00 (18:00 UTC+2)

Pyramids (Egypt)	2–0	(Egypt) Al-Masry
Traoré 21'; Dunga 71'	Report

30 June Stadium, Cairo
Referee: Jean Ouattara (Burkina Faso)

26 January 2020
16:00 (18:00 UTC+2)

Pyramids (Egypt)	0–1	(Nigeria) Enugu Rangers
	Report	George 73'

Cairo International Stadium, Cairo (Note: The Pyramids v Enugu Rangers match, originally scheduled to be played at 30 June Stadium, was played at Cairo International Stadium, both in Cairo, due to the former hosting the first African Para Games.)
Referee: Ali Mohamed Adelaide (Comoros)
26 January 2020
19:00 (21:00 UTC+2)

Al-Masry (Egypt)	1–0	(Mauritania) FC Nouadhibou
Simporé 86'	Report

Alexandria Stadium, Alexandria
Referee: Karim Sabry (Morocco)

2 February 2020
16:00 (18:00 UTC+2)

FC Nouadhibou (Mauritania)	0–1	(Egypt) Pyramids
	Report	Antwi 59'

30 June Stadium, Cairo (Egypt) (Note: The FC Nouadhibou v Pyramids match, originally scheduled to be played at Stade Cheikha Ould Boïdiya in Nouakchott, Mauritania, was played at 30 June Stadium in Cairo, Egypt, following request made by both clubs.)
Referee: Sekou Ahmed Touré (Guinea)
2 February 2020
19:00 (20:00 UTC+1)

Enugu Rangers (Nigeria)	1–1	(Egypt) Al-Masry
George 20'	Report	Wadi 6'

Nnamdi Azikiwe Stadium, Enugu
Referee: Andofetra Rakotojaona (Madagascar)

=== Group B ===
Pos	Team	Pld	W	D	L	GF	GA	GD	Pts	Qualification	HOR	NAS	DJO	BID
1	(Guinea) Horoya	6	4	2	0	8	1	+7	14	Advance to knockout stage	—	3–0	1–0	2–1
2	(Libya) Al-Nasr	6	2	2	2	4	7	−3	8 (Note: Head-to-head points: Al-Nasr 4, Djoliba 1.)	Advance to knockout stage	0–2	—	1–1	2–1
3	(Mali) Djoliba	6	2	2	2	4	3	+1	8		0–0	0–1	—	1–0
4	(South Africa) Bidvest Wits	6	0	2	4	2	7	−5	2		0–0	0–0	0–2	—

Source: CAF
Rules for classification: Tiebreakers
Notes:
1 December 2019
13:00 (15:00 UTC+2)

Al-Nasr (Libya)	1–1	(Mali) Djoliba
Almaryami 68' (pen.)	Report	Bah 52'

Al Salam Stadium, Cairo (Egypt) (Note: Teams from Libya played their home matches outside the country due to security concerns from the ongoing civil war.)
Referee: Noureddine El Jaafari (Morocco)
1 December 2019
16:00 (18:00 UTC+2)

Bidvest Wits (South Africa)	0–0	(Guinea) Horoya
	Report

Bidvest Stadium, Johannesburg
Referee: Peter Waweru (Kenya)

8 December 2019
16:00 (16:00 UTC+0)

Djoliba (Mali)	1–0	(South Africa) Bidvest Wits
Talatou 30'	Report

Stade du 26 Mars, Bamako
Referee: Ali Mohamed Adelaide (Comoros)
8 December 2019
16:00 (16:00 UTC+0)

Horoya (Guinea)	3–0	(Libya) Al-Nasr
Makambo 12'; Bancé 75' (pen.); Kutinyu 90'	Report

Stade du 28 Septembre, Conakry
Referee: Pilan Ncube (Zimbabwe)

29 December 2019
16:00 (16:00 UTC+0)

Horoya (Guinea)	1–0	(Mali) Djoliba
Sylla 19'	Report

Stade du 28 Septembre, Conakry
Referee: Bernard Camille (Seychelles)
29 December 2019
16:00 (18:00 UTC+2)

Bidvest Wits (South Africa)	0–0	(Libya) Al-Nasr
	Report

Dobsonville Stadium, Johannesburg
Referee: Mahmood Ismail (Sudan)

12 January 2020
16:00 (18:00 UTC+2)

Al-Nasr (Libya)	2–1	(South Africa) Bidvest Wits
Dzvukamanja 49' (o.g.); Alaeeli 61'	Report	Domingo 75'

Petro Sport Stadium, Cairo (Egypt)
Referee: Pierre Atcho (Gabon)
12 January 2020
19:00 (19:00 UTC+0)

Djoliba (Mali)	0–0	(Guinea) Horoya
	Report

Stade du 26 Mars, Bamako
Referee: Bakary Gassama (Gambia)

26 January 2020
16:00 (16:00 UTC+0)

Horoya (Guinea)	2–1	(South Africa) Bidvest Wits
Nikièma 5'; Haba 62'	Report	Hotto 21'

Stade du 28 Septembre, Conakry
Referee: Ahmed El Ghandour (Egypt)
26 January 2020
19:00 (19:00 UTC+0)

Djoliba (Mali)	0–1	(Libya) Al-Nasr
	Report	Al-Mehdi 68'

Stade du 26 Mars, Bamako
Referee: Helder Martins de Carvalho (Angola)

2 February 2020
16:00 (18:00 UTC+2)

Bidvest Wits (South Africa)	0–2	(Mali) Djoliba
	Report	Sanogo 15'; Camara 46'

Dobsonville Stadium, Johannesburg
Referee: Daniel Laryea (Ghana)
2 February 2020
16:00 (18:00 UTC+2)

Al-Nasr (Libya)	0–2	(Guinea) Horoya
	Report	Haba 11'; Nikièma 76' (pen.)

Petro Sport Stadium, Cairo (Egypt)
Referee: Jean-Jacques Ndala Ngambo (DR Congo)

=== Group C ===
Pos	Team	Pld	W	D	L	GF	GA	GD	Pts	Qualification	RSB	ZAN	DCM	ESA
1	(Morocco) RS Berkane	6	3	2	1	13	4	+9	11	Advance to knockout stage	—	1–1	3–0	3–0
2	(Zambia) Zanaco	6	2	4	0	8	4	+4	10 (Note: Head-to-head points: Zanaco 4, DC Motema Pembe 1.)	Advance to knockout stage	1–1	—	2–1	3–0
3	(Democratic Republic of the Congo) DC Motema Pembe	6	3	1	2	6	6	0	10		1–0	1–1	—	1–0
4	(Benin) ESAE	6	0	1	5	1	14	−13	1		1–5	0–0	0–2	—

Source: CAF
Rules for classification: Tiebreakers
Notes:
1 December 2019
13:00 (14:00 UTC+1)

DC Motema Pembe (Democratic Republic of the Congo)	1–1	(Zambia) Zanaco
Kolawole 78'	Report	Souleymanou 25'

Stade des Martyrs, Kinshasa
Referee: Sadok Selmi (Tunisia)
1 December 2019
16:00 (17:00 UTC+1)

RS Berkane (Morocco)	3–0	(Benin) ESAE
Krouch 26'; Laachir 32'; Ouattara 86'	Report

Stade Municipal de Berkane, Berkane
Referee: Issa Sy (Senegal)

8 December 2019
13:00 (14:00 UTC+1)

ESAE (Benin)	0–2	(Democratic Republic of the Congo) DC Motema Pembe
	Report	Kombe 36', 52'

Stade Charles de Gaulle, Porto-Novo (Note: ESAE played their group stage home matches at Stade Charles de Gaulle, Porto-Novo, instead of their regular home stadium Stade René Pleven d'Akpakpa, Cotonou.)
Referee: Ibrahim Nour El Din (Egypt)
8 December 2019
13:00 (15:00 UTC+2)

Zanaco (Zambia)	1–1	(Morocco) RS Berkane
Zulu 25'	Report	Ouattara 15'

National Heroes Stadium, Lusaka
Referee: Sidi Alioum (Cameroon)

29 December 2019
13:00 (14:00 UTC+1)

ESAE (Benin)	0–0	(Zambia) Zanaco
	Report

Stade Charles de Gaulle, Porto-Novo
Referee: Andofetra Rakotojaona (Madagascar)
29 December 2019
19:00 (20:00 UTC+1)

RS Berkane (Morocco)	3–0	(Democratic Republic of the Congo) DC Motema Pembe
Traoré 29'; Krouch 41'; Laachir 67'	Report

Stade Municipal de Berkane, Berkane
Referee: Boubou Traoré (Mali)

12 January 2020
13:00 (14:00 UTC+1)

DC Motema Pembe (Democratic Republic of the Congo)	1–0	(Morocco) RS Berkane
Luezi 69'	Report

Stade des Martyrs, Kinshasa
Referee: Victor Gomes (South Africa)
12 January 2020
13:00 (15:00 UTC+2)

Zanaco (Zambia)	3–0	(Benin) ESAE
Mbewe 54'; Kola 65', 81'	Report

National Heroes Stadium, Lusaka
Referee: Celso Alvação (Mozambique)

26 January 2020
13:00 (14:00 UTC+1)

ESAE (Benin)	1–5	(Morocco) RS Berkane
Sewa 1'	Report	Ajaray 30', 41', 53'; Laachir 36'; Aziz 75' (pen.)

Stade Charles de Gaulle, Porto-Novo
Referee: Peter Waweru (Kenya)
26 January 2020
13:00 (15:00 UTC+2)

Zanaco (Zambia)	2–1	(Democratic Republic of the Congo) DC Motema Pembe
Owusu 83'; Souleymanou 90+3'	Report	Nkongo 7'

National Heroes Stadium, Lusaka
Referee: Mohamed Ali Moussa (Niger)

2 February 2020
19:00 (20:00 UTC+1)

RS Berkane (Morocco)	1–1	(Zambia) Zanaco
Traoré 2'	Report	Dayo 39' (o.g.)

Stade Municipal de Berkane, Berkane
Referee: Mahmood Ismail (Sudan)
2 February 2020
19:00 (20:00 UTC+1)

DC Motema Pembe (Democratic Republic of the Congo)	1–0	(Benin) ESAE
Kombe 3'	Report

Stade des Martyrs, Kinshasa
Referee: Quadri Adebimpe (Nigeria)

=== Group D ===
Pos	Team	Pld	W	D	L	GF	GA	GD	Pts	Qualification	HAS	ENY	PAC	SNP
1	(Morocco) Hassania Agadir	6	3	2	1	9	5	+4	11	Advance to knockout stage	—	2–0	0–3	3–0
2	(Nigeria) Enyimba	6	3	1	2	11	7	+4	10	Advance to knockout stage	1–1	—	4–1	1–0
3	(Algeria) Paradou AC	6	2	2	2	5	6	−1	8		0–2	1–0	—	0–0
4	(Ivory Coast) FC San Pédro	6	0	3	3	3	10	−7	3		1–1	2–5	0–0	—

Source: CAF
Rules for classification: Tiebreakers
1 December 2019
16:00 (16:00 UTC+0)

FC San Pédro (Ivory Coast)	0–0	(Algeria) Paradou AC
	Report

Stade Félix Houphouët-Boigny, Abidjan (Note: FC San Pédro played their home matches at Stade Félix Houphouët-Boigny, Abidjan, instead of their regular home stadium Stade Auguste Denise, San-Pédro, which did not meet CAF requirements.)
Referee: Pacifique Ndabihawenimana (Burundi)
1 December 2019
19:00 (20:00 UTC+1)

Hassania Agadir (Morocco)	2–0	(Nigeria) Enyimba
El Berkaoui 14'; Cissé 19'	Report

Stade Adrar, Agadir
Referee: Sekou Ahmed Touré (Guinea)

8 December 2019
13:00 (14:00 UTC+1)

Enyimba (Nigeria)	1–0	(Ivory Coast) FC San Pédro
Usule 64'	Report

Enyimba International Stadium, Aba
Referee: Mohamed Ali Moussa (Niger)
8 December 2019
19:00 (20:00 UTC+1)

Paradou AC (Algeria)	0–2	(Morocco) Hassania Agadir
	Report	Oubilla 26'; Rami 48'

Mustapha Tchaker Stadium, Blida (Note: Paradou AC played their home matches at Mustapha Tchaker Stadium, Blida, instead of their regular home stadium Stade de Hydra, Hydra, which did not meet CAF requirements.)
Referee: Jean Ouattara (Burkina Faso)

29 December 2019
13:00 (13:00 UTC+0)

FC San Pédro (Ivory Coast)	1–1	(Morocco) Hassania Agadir
Zan Bi 81'	Report	El Fahli 37'

Stade Félix Houphouët-Boigny, Abidjan
Referee: Jean Claude Ishimwe (Rwanda)
29 December 2019
19:00 (20:00 UTC+1)

Paradou AC (Algeria)	1–0	(Nigeria) Enyimba
Ghorab 64'	Report

Mustapha Tchaker Stadium, Blida
Referee: Daouda Guèye (Senegal)

12 January 2020
13:00 (14:00 UTC+1)

Enyimba (Nigeria)	4–1	(Algeria) Paradou AC
Dimgba 15', 36', 76'; Mbaoma 35'	Report	Kadri 89'

Enyimba International Stadium, Aba
Referee: Al Hadi Mahamat (Chad)
12 January 2020
19:00 (20:00 UTC+1)

Hassania Agadir (Morocco)	3–0	(Ivory Coast) FC San Pédro
El Berkaoui 50', 54', 59'	Report

Stade Adrar, Agadir
Referee: Sadok Selmi (Tunisia)

26 January 2020
16:00 (17:00 UTC+1)

Enyimba (Nigeria)	1–1	(Morocco) Hassania Agadir
Oladapo 16'	Report	El Fahli 2'

Enyimba International Stadium, Aba
Referee: Issa Sy (Senegal)
26 January 2020
19:00 (20:00 UTC+1)

Paradou AC (Algeria)	0–0	(Ivory Coast) FC San Pédro
	Report

Mustapha Tchaker Stadium, Blida
Referee: Mutaz Ibrahim (Libya)

2 February 2020
16:00 (16:00 UTC+0)

FC San Pédro (Ivory Coast)	2–5	(Nigeria) Enyimba
Jimoh 6'; Zan Bi 44'	Report	Bashir 2'; Mbaoma 3', 75'; Oladapo 25'; Dimgba 85'

Stade Félix Houphouët-Boigny, Abidjan
Referee: Omar Abdulkadir Artan (Somalia)
2 February 2020
16:00 (17:00 UTC+1)

Hassania Agadir (Morocco)	0–3	(Algeria) Paradou AC
	Report	Kismoun 10', 72'; Bouzok 90+5'

Stade Adrar, Agadir
Referee: Abdel Aziz Mohamed Bouh (Mauritania)
