= 2019–20 CAF Confederation Cup knockout stage =

The 2019–20 CAF Confederation Cup knockout stage began on 1 March with the quarter-finals and ended on 25 October 2020 with the final to decide the champions of the 2019–20 CAF Confederation Cup. A total of eight teams compete in the knockout stage.

Times are GMT as listed by CAF (local times, even if not different, are in parentheses).

== Round and draw dates ==
The schedule is as follows.

Following the quarter-finals, due to the COVID-19 pandemic in Africa, the semi-finals, originally scheduled for 3 May (first legs) and 10 May (second legs), were postponed indefinitely on 11 April 2020, and the final, originally scheduled for 24 May, was also postponed on 18 April 2020. On 30 June 2020, the CAF Executive Committee proposed that the competition would resume with a Final Four format played as single matches in Morocco. On 3 August 2020, the CAF announced that the competition would resume with the semi-finals played on 22 September, and the final played on 27 September. On 10 September 2020, the CAF announced that at the request of the Royal Moroccan Football Federation, the semi-finals were rescheduled to 19–20 October, and the final to 25 October.

Round	Draw date	First leg	Second leg
Quarter-finals	5 February 2020	1 March 2020	8 March 2020
Semi-finals	5 February 2020	19–20 October 2020	
Final	5 February 2020	25 October 2020	

== Format ==
In the knockout stage, the quarter-finals were played over two legs, with each team playing one leg at home. The team that scored more goals on aggregate over the two legs advanced to the next round. If the aggregate score was level, the away goals rule is applied, i.e. the team that scored more goals away from home over the two legs advanced. If away goals were also equal, then extra time was not played and the winners were decided by a penalty shoot-out.

The semi-finals were originally to be played over two legs, but were played as single matches after the format change due to the COVID-19 pandemic.

In the final, which was played as a single match, if the score was level at the end of normal time, extra time was also not to be played and the winners would be decided by a penalty shoot-out.

The mechanism of the draws for each round was as follows:

- In the draw for the quarter-finals, the four group winners were seeded, and the four group runners-up were unseeded. The seeded teams were drawn against the unseeded teams, with the seeded teams hosting the second leg. Teams from the same group could not be drawn against each other, while teams from the same association could be drawn against each other.
- In the draws for semi-finals, there were no seedings, and teams from the same group or the same association could be drawn against each other. As the draws for the quarter-finals and semi-finals were held together before the quarter-finals were played, the identity of the quarter-final winners was not known at the time of the semi-final draw.

== Qualified teams ==
The knockout phase involves the 8 teams which qualify as winners and runners-up of each of the eight groups in the group stage.

Group	Winners	Runners-up
A	(Egypt) Pyramids	(Egypt) Al-Masry
B	(Guinea) Horoya	(Libya) Al-Nasr
C	(Morocco) RS Berkane	(Zambia) Zanaco
D	(Morocco) Hassania Agadir	(Nigeria) Enyimba

== Bracket ==
The bracket of the knockout stage is determined as follows:

Round	Matchups
Quarter-finals	(Group winners host second leg, matchups decided by draw, teams from same group cannot play each other): QF1; QF2; QF3; QF4
Semi-finals	(Matchups, and originally order of legs, decided by draw, between winners QF1, QF2, QF3, QF4): SF1; SF2
Final	Winners SF1 and SF2 play each other to decide the champions

The bracket was decided after the draw for the knockout stage (quarter-finals and semi-finals), which was held on 5 February 2020, 19:00 CAT (UTC+2), at the Hilton Pyramids Golf in Cairo, Egypt.

Quarter-finals
(Zambia) Zanaco	0	1	1
(Egypt) Pyramids	3	0	3
(Nigeria) Enyimba	1	0	1
(Guinea) Horoya	1	2	3
(Egypt) Al-Masry	2	0	2
(Morocco) RS Berkane	2	1	3
(Libya) Al-Nasr	0	0	0
(Morocco) Hassania Agadir	5	2	7

Semi-finals
(Egypt) Pyramids	2
(Guinea) Horoya	0
(Morocco) RS Berkane	2
(Morocco) Hassania Agadir	1

Final
(Egypt) Pyramids	0
(Morocco) RS Berkane	1

== Quarter-finals ==
The draw for the quarter-finals was held on 5 February 2020.

=== Summary ===
The first legs were played on 1 March, and the second legs were played on 8 March 2020.

Team 1	Agg.	Team 2	1st leg	2nd leg
Zanaco (Zambia)	1–3	(Egypt) Pyramids	0–3	1–0
Al-Nasr (Libya)	0–7	(Morocco) Hassania Agadir	0–5	0–2
Al-Masry (Egypt)	2–3	(Morocco) RS Berkane	2–2	0–1
Enyimba (Nigeria)	1–3	(Guinea) Horoya	1–1	0–2

=== Matches ===
1 March 2020
13:00 (15:00 UTC+2)

Zanaco (Zambia)	0–3	(Egypt) Pyramids
	Report	Gabr 18'; Farouk 24'; El Said 68' (pen.)

National Heroes Stadium, Lusaka
Referee: Andofetra Rakotojaona (Madagascar)
8 March 2020
13:00 (15:00 UTC+2)

Pyramids (Egypt)	0–1	(Zambia) Zanaco
	Report	Kola 45+1'

30 June Stadium, Cairo
Referee: Eric Otogo-Castane (Gabon)

Pyramids won 3–1 on aggregate.

1 March 2020
16:00 (18:00 UTC+2)

Al-Nasr (Libya)	0–5	(Morocco) Hassania Agadir
	Report	El Berkaoui 9', 15', 56'; Cissé 78', 87'

Petro Sport Stadium, Cairo (Egypt) (Note: Teams from Libya played their home matches outside the country due to security concerns from the ongoing civil war.)
Referee: Victor Gomes (South Africa)
8 March 2020
16:00 (17:00 UTC+1)

Hassania Agadir (Morocco)	2–0	(Libya) Al-Nasr
El Berkaoui 69' (pen.); Atassi 90+4'	Report

Stade Adrar, Agadir
Attendance: 0 (Note: The Royal Moroccan Football Federation announced on 5 March 2020 that all football matches in the country would be played behind closed doors due to the coronavirus outbreak in Morocco.)
Referee: Bernard Camille (Seychelles)

Hassania Agadir won 7–0 on aggregate.

1 March 2020
19:00 (21:00 UTC+2)

Al-Masry (Egypt)	2–2	(Morocco) RS Berkane
Taktak 46'; Laâroubi 61' (o.g.)	Report	Iajour 44', 82'

Suez Stadium, Suez (Note: On 5 February 2020, Al-Masry requested from the Egyptian Football Association to play their home leg against RS Berkane in Ismailia, instead of their regular home stadium Al Masry Club Stadium, Port Said, which was undergoing renovation, due to being closer to Port Said, so more fans could attend the match. However, the EFA told the club that their request was declined by the local security authorities and were asked to find a different stadium. As a result, Al-Masry requested from RS Berkane to play both legs in Morocco and they received an initial agreement from the Moroccan side, but Al-Masry were asked to confirm their decision to play the match outside Egypt. However, it was announced on 17 February 2020 that the match would be played at Suez Stadium in Suez, Egypt, following a meeting involving Al-Masry president and the Egyptian Minister of Youth and Sports.)
Referee: Joshua Bondo (Botswana)
8 March 2020
19:00 (20:00 UTC+1)

RS Berkane (Morocco)	1–0	(Egypt) Al-Masry
Naji 39'	Report

Stade Municipal de Berkane, Berkane
Attendance: 0
Referee: Sadok Selmi (Tunisia)

RS Berkane won 3–2 on aggregate.

1 March 2020
13:00 (14:00 UTC+1)

Enyimba (Nigeria)	1–1	(Guinea) Horoya
Oladapo 19'	Report	Haba 71'

Enyimba International Stadium, Aba
Referee: Amin Omar (Egypt)
8 March 2020
16:00 (16:00 UTC+0)

Horoya (Guinea)	2–0	(Nigeria) Enyimba
Sakin 28'; Samassekou 84'	Report

Stade du 28 Septembre, Conakry
Referee: Pacifique Ndabihawenimana (Burundi)

Horoya won 3–1 on aggregate.

== Semi-finals ==
The draw for the semi-finals was held on 5 February 2020 (after the quarter-finals draw).

=== Summary ===
Due to the COVID-19 pandemic in Africa, all semi-final matches, originally scheduled for 1–2 May (first legs) and 8–9 May 2020 (second legs), were postponed until further notice. The matches were later rescheduled as single matches in Morocco for 19–20 October 2020, at Prince Moulay Abdellah Stadium, Rabat and Stade Mohamed V, Casablanca.

Team 1	Score	Team 2
Pyramids (Egypt)	2–0	(Guinea) Horoya
RS Berkane (Morocco)	2–1	(Morocco) Hassania Agadir

=== Matches ===
20 October 2020
19:00 (20:00 UTC+1)

Pyramids (Egypt)	2–0	(Guinea) Horoya
Hassan 74'; El Said 75'	Report

Stade Mohamed V, Casablanca
Referee: Bamlak Tessema Weyesa (Ethiopia)

19 October 2020
19:00 (20:00 UTC+1)

RS Berkane (Morocco)	2–1	(Morocco) Hassania Agadir
Aziz 20' (pen.), 61' (pen.)	Report	Kimaoui 30'

Prince Moulay Abdellah Stadium, Rabat
Referee: Jean-Jacques Ndala Ngambo (DR Congo)

== Final ==
Due to the COVID-19 pandemic, the final, originally scheduled for 24 May 2020, 19:00 GMT, at the Prince Moulay Abdellah Stadium, Rabat, Morocco, was postponed until further notice. The final was later rescheduled for 25 October 2020.

25 October 2020
19:00 (20:00 UTC+1)

Pyramids (Egypt)	0–1	(Morocco) RS Berkane
	Report	Dayo 15'

Prince Moulay Abdellah Stadium, Rabat
Attendance: 0 (Note: Final match played behind closed doors due to the COVID-19 pandemic in Morocco.)
Referee: Sidi Alioum (Cameroon)
