= 2020 CAF Confederation Cup final =

- Event: 2019–20 CAF Confederation Cup
Pyramids	RS Berkane
(Egypt)	(Morocco)
0	1
- Date: 25 October 2020
- Venue: Prince Moulay Abdellah Stadium, Rabat
- Man of the Match: Abdallah El Said (Pyramids)
- Referee: Sidi Alioum (Cameroon)
- Attendance: 0 (Note: Final match played behind closed doors due to the COVID-19 pandemic in Morocco.)
- Weather: Partly cloudy 15 °C (59 °F); 77% humidity

The 2020 CAF Confederation Cup final was the final of the 2019–20 CAF Confederation Cup, the 17th edition of Africa's secondary club football tournament organized by the Confederation of African Football (CAF), under the current CAF Confederation Cup title after the merger of CAF Cup and African Cup Winners' Cup.

For the first time, the final was played as a single match at a venue pre-selected by CAF. It was originally scheduled to be played on 24 May 2020 at the Prince Moulay Abdellah Stadium in Rabat, Morocco. However, due to the COVID-19 pandemic, the match was postponed and was played on 25 October 2020, as part of a Final Four format played as single matches in Morocco.

RS Berkane defeated Pyramids and won 1–0, earning themselves their first ever CAF Confederation Cup and African trophy. They also earned the right to play against the 2019–20 CAF Champions League winners in the 2020–21 CAF Super Cup.

== Teams ==
Team	Zone	Previous finals appearances (bold indicates winners)
(Egypt) Pyramids	UNAF (North Africa)	None
(Morocco) RS Berkane	UNAF (North Africa)	1 (2019)

== Venue ==
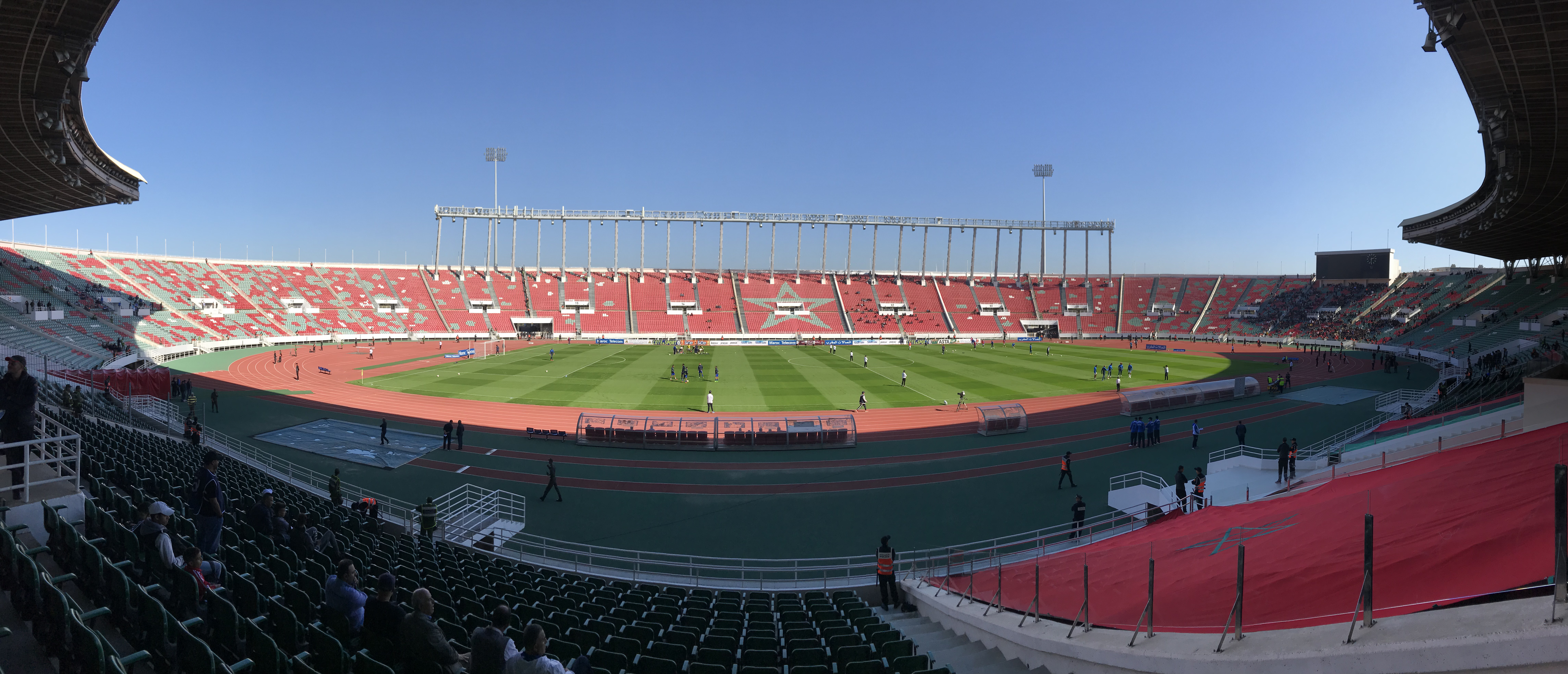
Prince Moulay Abdellah Stadium in Rabat, Morocco, hosted the final.

The CAF Executive Committee decided in June 2019 that the final would be played as a single match. One member association submitted bids during the period of 11–20 February 2020:

Bidding associations for the 2020 CAF Confederation Cup Final
Country	Stadium	City	Capacity	Notes
Morocco	Prince Moulay Abdellah Stadium	Rabat	53,000	Hosted matches at the 1988 African Cup of Nations

The CAF Emergency Committee made the final decision on 12 March 2020, and Prince Moulay Abdellah Stadium, Rabat was officially announced as the final venue on 16 March 2020.

=== Postponement ===
On 18 April 2020, the CAF announced that the final had been postponed until further notice due to the COVID-19 pandemic.

On 3 August 2020, the CAF announced that the final would be played on 27 September 2020.

On 10 September 2020, the CAF announced that at the request of the Royal Moroccan Football Federation, the final was rescheduled to 25 October 2020.

== Road to the final ==
Note: In all results below, the score of the finalist is given first (H: home; A: away; N: neutral).

(Egypt) Pyramids				Round	(Morocco) RS Berkane			
**Confederation Cup**
Opponent	Agg.	1st leg	2nd leg	Qualifying rounds	Opponent	Agg.	1st leg	2nd leg
(Republic of the Congo) Étoile du Congo	5–1	4–1 (H)	1–0 (A)	Preliminary round	Bye			
(Algeria) CR Belouizdad	2–1	1–1 (H)	1–0 (A)	First round	(Ghana) Ashanti Gold	4–3	2–3 (A)	2–0 (H)
(Tanzania) Young Africans	5–1	2–1 (A)	3–0 (H)	Play-off round	(Madagascar) Fosa Juniors	5–2	0–2 (A)	5–0 (H)
Opponent	Result			Group stage	Opponent	Result		
(Nigeria) Enugu Rangers	3–1 (A)			Matchday 1	(Benin) ESAE	3–0 (H)		
(Mauritania) FC Nouadhibou	6–0 (H)			Matchday 2	(Zambia) Zanaco	1–1 (A)		
(Egypt) Al-Masry	2–1 (A)			Matchday 3	(Democratic Republic of the Congo) DC Motema Pembe	3–0 (H)		
(Egypt) Al-Masry	2–0 (H)			Matchday 4	(Democratic Republic of the Congo) DC Motema Pembe	0–1 (A)		
(Nigeria) Enugu Rangers	0–1 (H)			Matchday 5	(Benin) ESAE	5–1 (A)		
(Mauritania) FC Nouadhibou	1–0 (A)			Matchday 6	(Zambia) Zanaco	1–1 (H)		
**Group A winners**: Pos / Team / Pld / Pts; **1** / (Egypt) Pyramids / **6** / **15**; 2 / (Egypt) Al-Masry / 6 / **10**; 3 / (Nigeria) Enugu Rangers / 6 / **6**; 4 / (Mauritania) FC Nouadhibou / 6 / **2**; Source: CAF				Final standings	**Group C winners**: Pos / Team / Pld / Pts; **1** / (Morocco) RS Berkane / **6** / **11**; 2 / (Zambia) Zanaco / 6 / **10**; 3 / (Democratic Republic of the Congo) DC Motema Pembe / 6 / **10**; 4 / (Benin) ESAE / 6 / **1**; Source: CAF			
Opponent	Agg.	1st leg	2nd leg	Knockout stage	Opponent	Agg.	1st leg	2nd leg
(Zambia) Zanaco	3–1	3–0 (A)	0–1 (H)	Quarter-finals	(Egypt) Al-Masry	3–2	2–2 (A)	1–0 (H)
(Guinea) Horoya	2–0 (N)			Semi-finals	(Morocco) Hassania Agadir	2–1 (N)		

== Format ==
The final is played as a single match at a pre-selected venue, with the winner of semi-final 1 according to the knockout stage draw designated as the "home" team for administrative purposes. If scores are level after full-time, extra time is not played and the winners are decided by a penalty shoot-out (Regulations Article III. 28).

== Officials ==
On 24 October 2020, CAF named Cameroonian referee Sidi Alioum as the referee for the match. Alioum is a member of the CAF Elite and took charge of numerous important matches in competitions organized by CAF, including the 2019 Africa Cup of Nations final. His compatriot Elvis Guy Noupue was chosen as one of the assistant referees, along with Chadian official Issa Yaya, while Eric Otogo-Castane of Gabon was chosen as the fourth official. Zambian referee Janny Sikazwe was named the video assistant referee and was assisted by Haythem Guirat from Tunisia and Gerson Emiliano dos Santos from Angola.

== Match ==
25 October 2020
19:00 GMT
(20:00 UTC+1)

Pyramids (Egypt)	0–1	(Morocco) RS Berkane
	Report	Dayo 15'

Prince Moulay Abdellah Stadium, Rabat
Attendance: 0
Referee: Sidi Alioum (Cameroon)

**Pyramids**	**RS Berkane**

GK	1	(Egypt) El Mahdy Soliman	(yellow card) 90'
CB	3	(Egypt) Abdallah Bakry
CB	5	(Egypt) Ali Gabr
RB	12	(Egypt) Ahmed Tawfik		(substituted off) 66'
LB	2	(Egypt) Ahmed Ayman Mansour		(substituted off) 56'
CM	4	(Egypt) Omar Gaber		(substituted off) 90+2'
CM	14	(Egypt) Nabil Emad
AM	19	(Egypt) Abdallah El Said (c)	(yellow card) 90+4'
LM	21	(Egypt) Mohamed Hamdy	(yellow card) 14'
RM	17	(Egypt) Mohamed Farouk	(yellow card) 20'
CF	7	(Burkina Faso) Eric Traoré
Substitutes:
GK	16	(Egypt) Ahmed El Shenawy
MF	6	(Egypt) Mohamed Fathy
MF	15	(Egypt) Mahmoud Hamada		(substituted on) 90+2'
MF	18	(Egypt) Ibrahim Hassan		(substituted on) 56'
FW	9	(Ghana) John Antwi		(substituted on) 66'
FW	26	(Egypt) Mohamed El Gabbas
FW	30	(Egypt) Ibrahim Adel
Manager:
(Croatia) Ante Čačić

GK	1	(Morocco) Zouheir Laâroubi
RB	4	(Burkina Faso) Issoufou Dayo
CB	14	(Morocco) Ismael Mokadem	(yellow card) 4'
LB	25	(Morocco) Mohamed Aziz (c)
CM	8	(Morocco) Larbi Naji	(yellow card) 23'
CM	21	(Morocco) Bakr El Helali	(red card) 89'
RM	23	(Morocco) Omar Namsaoui
LM	22	(Morocco) Zakaria Hadraf		(substituted off) 65'
RW	7	(Morocco) Hamdi Laachir
LW	9	(Morocco) Mouhcine Iajour		(substituted off) 90+2'
CF	10	(Morocco) Zaid Krouch	(yellow card) 43'	(substituted off) 83'
Substitutes:
GK	12	(Morocco) Hamza Hamiani
DF	15	(Morocco) Hamza Regragui		(substituted on) 90+2'
DF	29	(Morocco) Mohamed Farhane
MF	17	(Morocco) Amine El Kass		(substituted on) 65'
FW	19	(Burkina Faso) Alain Traoré		(substituted on) 83'
FW	24	(Morocco) Youssef Zghoudi
FW	27	(Morocco) Alaedine Ajaray
Manager:
(Morocco) Tarik Sektioui

Man of the Match:
Abdallah El Said
(Pyramids)

Assistant referees:
Elvis Guy Noupue (Cameroon)
Issa Yaya (Chad)
Fourth official:
Eric Otogo-Castane (Gabon)
Video assistant referee:
Janny Sikazwe (Zambia)
Assistant video assistant referees:
Haythem Guirat (Tunisia)
Gerson Emiliano dos Santos (Angola)

**Match rules**

- 90 minutes.
- Penalty shoot-out if scores level.
- Seven named substitutes, of which up to five may be used.

== See also ==
- 2020 CAF Champions League Final
- 2020–21 CAF Super Cup
