= 2019 CAF Confederation Cup =

2019 CAF Confederation Cup may refer to:

- 2018–19 CAF Confederation Cup
- 2019–20 CAF Confederation Cup
