= Ifeanyi George =

Nigerian footballer (1993–2020)

Personal information
- Date of birth: 22 November 1993
- Place of birth: Umuahia, Nigeria
- Date of death: 22 March 2020 (aged 26)
- Place of death: Abudu, Nigeria
- Position: Striker

Senior career*
Years	Team	Apps	(Gls)
2015	Enyimba		
2016–2020	Enugu Rangers		

International career
2017	Nigeria	2	(0)
- * Club domestic league appearances and goals

Ifeanyi George (22 November 1993 – 22 March 2020) was a Nigerian professional footballer who played as a striker.

== Career ==
Born in Umuahia, George played club football for Enyimba and Enugu Rangers.

He earned two caps for Nigeria in 2017.

== Death ==
Ifeanyi was killed in a car accident on 22 March 2020 whilst traveling from Enugu to Lagos following the cancelation of the Nigerian league due to COVID-19. Ifenayi, along with teammate Emmanuel Ogbu and friend Eteka Gabriel, were reported to have crashed into an articulated vehicle. All 3 people in the car died at the scene.
