= 2018 Libyan Cup =

Tournament details
- Country: Libya

Final positions
- Champions: Al-Ittihad

The 2018 Libyan Cup is the 22nd edition of the Libyan knockout football competition since its inception in 1976. The tournament returned after not being held in 2017, and started in January 2018.

== Round of 64 ==
Team 1	Score	Team 2
28 Jan 2018
Attaawen	3 : 0	AL - Salawy
Annajma	4 : 0	AL - mujahid
Alhilal	2 : 0	New Benghazi
29 Jan 2018
Alahly Benghazi	6 : 1	AL khor
Almadina	6 : 0	Altahrer
Al Nasr - zlitn	4 : 0	AL - Hany
AL-Shrooq	1 : 0	etthad taorga
30 Jan 2018
Alakhdhar	1 : 0	Al-Africy
Darnes	1 : 0	Al-Suqoor
Alkhumes	5 : 0	AL watan Alarabi
Shabab Aljabel	1 : 0	Suqoor Al khaleej
Libyan Stadium	2 : 1	Asarya
31 Jan 2018
Khaleej Sirte	1 : 0	SHAMALBenghazi
Asswehly	0 : 0 (3 : 5 p)	Al Amal
Olympic Azzaweya	0 : 0 (1 : 3 p)	Al-yarmook
Almahdiya	0 : 6	Al-Magd
Almahalla	3 : 0	Al-jazeera
Alittihad Misurata	2 : 0	Hilal Sabha
1 Feb 2018
Alwahda	2 : 1	Al-amn Alaam
Rafeeq	6 : 0	AL - hedaya
3 Feb 2018
Attersana	1 : 0	Al ashea
4 Feb 2018
Alandalus	2 : 0	NSOR MRTOBA
Nojoom Ajdabia	9 : 0	Al soahel
Ascharara	2 : 4	Al-Gamarek
Alanwar	1 : 2	Al-Nojoom
5 Feb 2018
Annaser	0 : 0 (3 : 5 p)	Al-Sadaka
Alittihad	2 : 2 (3 : 1 p)	Al-shmoe
Alqurdhabiya	0 : 2	Abu sleem
Abi Lashhar	2 : 1	Al-Mustaqbal
7 Feb 2018
Alahly Tripoli	7 : 0	Al-tomooh
Aschat	3 : 0	zanata
5 Mar 2018
Attahaddy	2 : 0	Wefaq Ajdabiya

== Round of 32 ==
Team 1	Score	Team 2
3 Mar 2018
Al Nasr - zlitn	0 : 4	Attaawen
Al-Nojoom	0 : 1	Alahly Benghazi
4 Mar 2018
Abu sleem	1 : 1 (1 : 4 p)	Alhilal
5 Mar 2018
Al-Gamarek	0 : 0 (4 : 2 p)	Nojoom Ajdabia
Shabab Aljabel	1 : 1 (5 : 6 p)	Khaleej Sirte
6 Mar 2018
AL-Shrooq	0 : 1	Attersana
7 Mar 2018
Alandalus	0 : 0 (5 : 6 p)	Al-yarmook
Almahalla	2 : 1	Al Amal
Al-Sadaka	1 : 3	Alittihad Misurata
Rafeeq	1 : 2	Alkhumes
8 Mar 2018
Aschat	0 : 0 (3 : 2 p)	Darnes
Libyan Stadium	0 : 1	Almadina
9 Mar 2018
Alakhdhar	3 : 2	Abi Lashhar
11 Mar 2018
Al-Magd	1 : 1 (4 : 3 p)	Annajma
12 Mar 2018
Alwahda	0 : 1	Alittihad
18 Mar 2018
Alahly Tripoli	1 : 0	Attahaddy

== Round of 16 ==
Team 1	Score	Team 2
6 Apr 2018
Al-yarmook	1 : 2	Alahly Benghazi
Almahalla	3 : 0	Al-Magd
7 Apr 2018
Attaawen	1 : 1 (2 : 3 p)	Alhilal
Alahly Tripoli	1 : 0	Almadina
8 Apr 2018
Alakhdhar	2 : 1	Al-Gamarek
Attersana	1 : 2	Alkhumes
10 Apr 2018
Aschat	1 : 2	Alittihad
12 Apr 2018
Khaleej Sirte	1 : 0	Alittihad Misurata

== Quarter-finals ==
Team 1	Score	Team 2
27 Apr 2018
Alakhdhar	1 : 2	Alittihad
4 May 2018
Alahly Benghazi	1 : 1 (2 : 4 p)	Alhilal
5 May 2018
Alahly Tripoli	4 : 0	Almahalla
Khaleej Sirte	0 : 0 (4 : 5 p)	Alkhumes

== Semi-finals ==
Team 1	Score	Team 2
12 Jun 2018
Alkhumes	0 : 0 (2 : 4 p)	Alhilal
TBA
Alahly Tripoli	0 : 2 (awd)	Alittihad

Note: Original match on 21 Jun 2018 between Alahly Tripoli and Alittihad ended 0 : 0, and was suspended during the penalty shoot-out. The Libyan Football Federation decided to replay the match on 8 July 2018, but Alahly Tripoli decided not to play.

== Final ==
Team 1	Score	Team 2
16 Jul 2018
Alittihad	2 : 0	Alhilal
