= Ernest Mbewe =

Zambian footballer (born 1994)

Personal information
- Date of birth: 11 November 1994 (age 32)
- Place of birth: Zambia
- Position: Midfielder

Team information
- Current team: Zanaco F.C.
- Number: 12

Senior career*
Years	Team	Apps	(Gls)
2015–	Zanaco F.C.		

International career^{‡}
2017–	Zambia	20	(0)
- * Club domestic league appearances and goals ‡ National team caps and goals as of 18 July 2020

Ernest Mbewe (born 11 November 1994) is a Zambian footballer who plays as a midfielder for Zanaco F.C. and the Zambia national football team.

== International career ==
Mbewe made his senior international debut on 16 July 2016, starting in a 4–0 victory over Eswatini during qualifying for the African Nations Championship. Mbewe was named in the final squad for that tournament after Zambia qualified, appearing in all four matches against Uganda, Ivory Coast, Namibia, and Sudan. Mbewe was also included in Zambia's squad for the 2019 COSAFA Cup, appearing in all three of Zambia's matches as they won the tournament.

== Career statistics ==
=== International ===
As of matches played 3 August 2019.

National team	Year	Apps	Goals
Zambia	2017	8	0
Zambia	2018	6	0
Zambia	2019	6	0
Total		20	0

== Honors ==
=== International ===
Zambia

- COSAFA Cup Champion: 2019
