= Ben Benaiah =

Liberian footballer

Personal information
- Full name: Ben David Benaiah
- Date of birth: 6 December 1992 (age 33)
- Place of birth: Monrovia, Liberia
- Height: 1.75 m (5 ft 9 in)
- Position: Center-back

Team information
- Current team: LPRC Oilers
- Number: 12

Senior career*
Years	Team	Apps	(Gls)
2017–2021	Nimba United		
2021–	LPRC Oilers		

International career^{‡}
2019–	Liberia	5	(0)
- * Club domestic league appearances and goals ‡ National team caps and goals as of 23:07, 14 March 2022 (UTC)

Ben David Benaiah (born 6 December 1992) is a Liberian professional footballer who plays as a center-back for Liberian First Division club LPRC Oilers and the Liberia national team.
