= Victor Mbaoma =

Nigerian footballer

Personal information
- Date of birth: 20 October 1996 (age 30)
- Place of birth: Lagos, Nigeria
- Height: 1.84 m (6 ft 0 in)
- Position: Centre forward

Team information
- Current team: Remo Stars
- Number: 25

Senior career*
Years	Team	Apps	(Gls)
2017	Remo Stars	9	(10)
2018	Akwa United	21	(5)
2018-2019	Teplice U-21	1	(0)
2019	Remo Stars	17	(5)
2019–2021	Enyimba F.C.	43	(15)
2022	MC Algiers	6	(0)
2023	Qizilqum Zarafshon	9	(1)
2023- 2025	APR FC	12	(14)
2025-	Remo Stars F.C.	28	(13)

International career^{‡}
2022–	Nigeria	2	(0)
- * Club domestic league appearances and goals as of 10 April 2023 ‡ National team caps and goals as of 2 June 2022

Victor Mbaoma (born 20 October 1996) is a Nigerian footballer who plays for APR FC as a centre-forward. He has played for the Nigeria national football team.

== Club career ==
Born in Lagos, Ifeanyi spent his early career with Remo Stars F.C., Akwa United, and Enyimba F.C. After his stint with Remo Stars F.C., he moved to Eyinmba football club in 2019 after Remo Stars was relegated from the Nigeria professional football league.

Victor was one of the highest goal scorers in the league and this led to his call-up to the Nigeria National Team. He scored 16 goals in 21 games for his Eyinmba side.

He was signed by the top-flight Algerian club MC Alger on a two-year deal in June 2022.

Victor was unveiled in January 2023 by Qizilqum Zarafshon after a free transfer from MC Alger.

== International career ==
He made his international debut for Nigeria in 2022 during the International Friendly call-up games between Mexico and Ecuador.
