= Rodgers Kola =

Zambian footballer (born 1989)

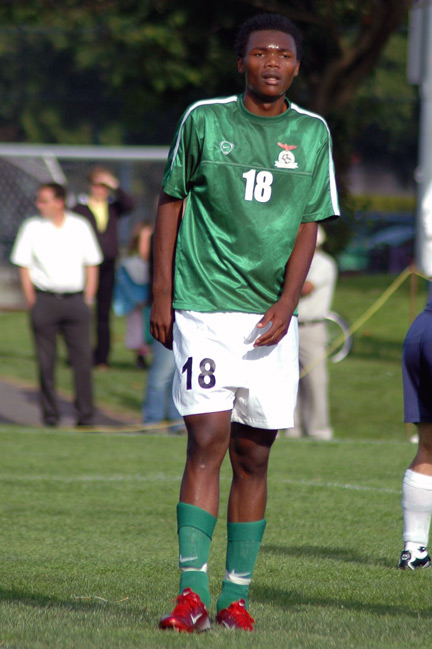

Personal information
- Full name: Rodgers Kola
- Date of birth: 4 July 1989 (age 37)
- Place of birth: Lusaka, Zambia
- Height: 1.88 m (6 ft 2 in)
- Positions: Forward; winger

Team information
- Current team: Zanaco

Youth career
- 2004–2006: Edusport

Senior career*
Years	Team	Apps	(Gls)
2008	Zanaco		(13)
2008–2009	Golden Arrows	10	(1)
2009–2010	Hapoel Bnei Lod	14	(1)
2010–2011	Hapoel Rishon LeZion	29	(11)
2011–2012	F.C. Ashdod	28	(6)
2012–2017	Gent	22	(2)
2014–2015	→ Hapoel Ironi Kiryat Shmona (loan)	30	(7)
2015–2016	→ Veria (loan)	12	(1)
2016–2017	→ Hapoel Ra'anana (loan)	14	(0)
2019–2021	Zanaco		
2021–2023	Azam		
2024–	Zanaco		

International career^{‡}
2008–2021	Zambia	23	(2)
- * Club domestic league appearances and goals as of 18:33, 8 January 2026 (UTC) ‡ National team caps and goals as of 12 November 2016

Rodgers Kola (born 4 July 1989) is a Zambian footballer who plays for Zanaco. He is a versatile forward who is usually deployed on the wing.

== Club career ==
Kola was born in Lusaka. He signed for Russia's PFC Spartak Nalchik in July 2008 but could not link up with his teammates in Russia due to visa problems. Because of this, he returned to Zanaco in Zambia.

Kola successfully scored 2 goals at the 2007 FIFA U-20 World Cup and caught the eye of many European Clubs. He also scored 2 goals in a practice match against Zambia National U-20 Football team and another 2 against a German side in another practice match.

In 2009, he moved to Israel to play in Hapoel Bnei Lod who plays in the second division in Israel, a year later he moved to Hapoel Ironi Rishon LeZion from the same division.

In 2011, he started playing for the Israeli team F.C. Ashdod. Over there, he scored 7 goals in 31 games.

On 8 May 2012, it was announced that Kola would start playing in Belgium for the team K.A.A. Gent.

In January 2014, Kola returned to Israel and signed with Hapoel Ironi Kiryat Shmona. On January 28, he scored his first goal for the club against Hapoel Ironi Acre in the 8th round of the Israel State Cup. Kola scored against Beitar Jerusalem in the quarter finals match and in the semi-final match versus Hapoel Be'er Sheva and eventually won the Israeli State Cup. This was the first Israeli State Cup title Hapoel Kiryat Shmona ever won.

On 25 July 2015, Kola, was loaned to the Greek club Veria, for one year. Kola made his debut on 12 September 2015 in a 0–3 home defeat against PAOK where he had a few chances to score with headers though Robin Olsen stopped him twice.

In July 2021, Kola joined Azam on a two-year contract. Kola left Azam in summer 2023 at the end of his contract. He was out of contract until signing for a third spell at Zanaco in March 2024.

== International career ==
He already played 13 games in the team of the African Cup of Nations 2012-winner Zambia, in which he scored 2 times.

=== International goals ===
Scores and results list Zambia's goal tally first.

No.	Date	Venue	Opponent	Score	Result	Competition
1.	25 May 2008	Azadi Stadium, Tehran, Iran	Iran	2–2	2–3	Friendly
2.	4 January 2009	Bugembe Stadium, Jinja, Uganda	Burundi	1–0	1–1	2008 CECAFA Cup

== Honours ==
Hapoel Ironi Kiryat Shmona

- Israel State Cup: 2014

=== Individual ===
- Zambia Super League Top scorer: 2008
