= Moulay Abdellah Sports Complex (1983) =

Former stadium in Rabat, Morocco

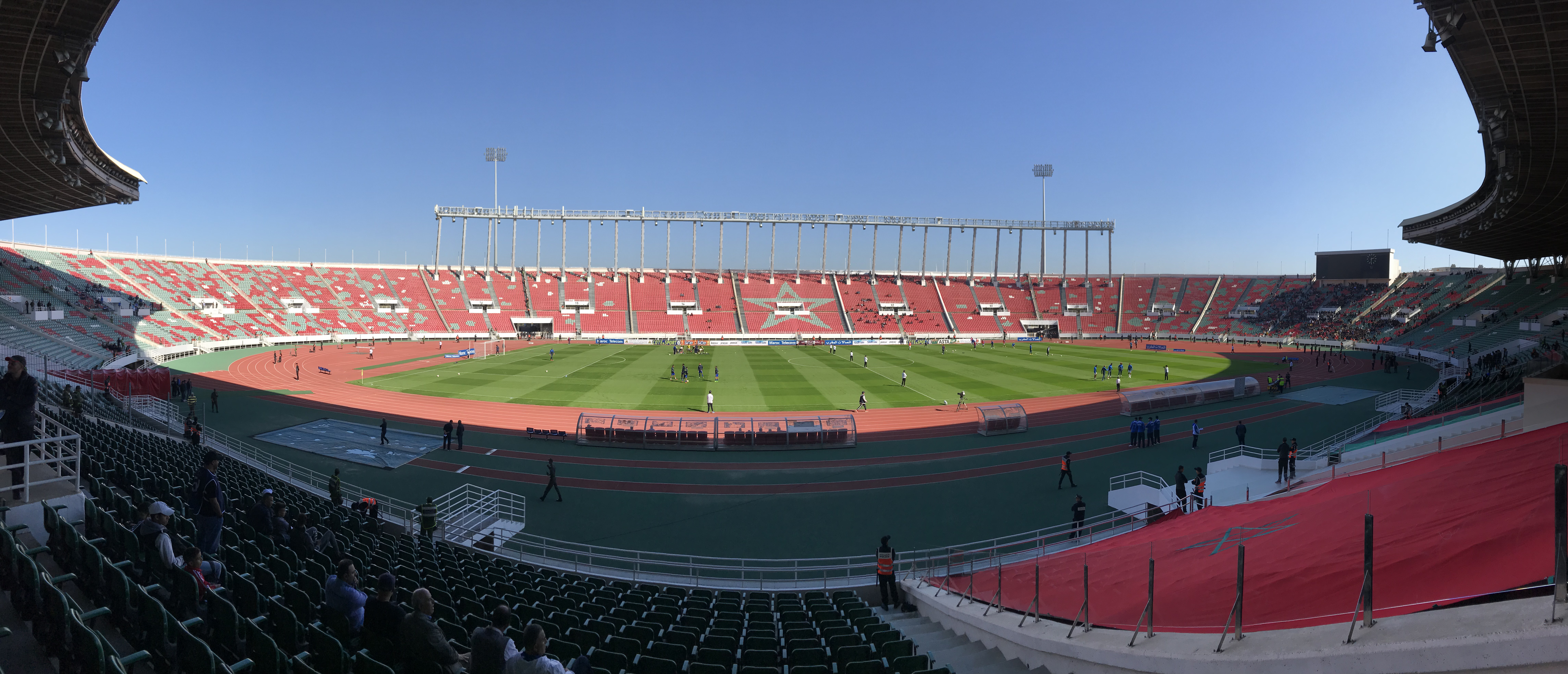
- Interactive map of Moulay Abdellah Sports Complex
- Location: Rabat, Morocco
- Coordinates: 33°57′34″N 6°53′19″W
- Owner: City of Rabat
- Capacity: 50,000
- Surface: Grass
- Record attendance: 80,000
- Field size: 105 m × 68 m

Construction
- Groundbreaking: 1980
- Opened: 1983
- Renovated: 2000, 2014
- Closed: 2023
- Demolished: 2023
- Rebuilt: Replaced by the new Prince Moulay Abdellah Stadium

Tenants
- AS FAR (1983–2023); Morocco national football team (1983–2023)

Moulay Abdellah Sports Complex (Arabic: المجمع الرياضي الأمير مولاي عبد الله) was a football stadium in Rabat, Morocco. It was named after Prince Moulay Abdellah of Morocco, It was the home of AS FAR.

== History ==
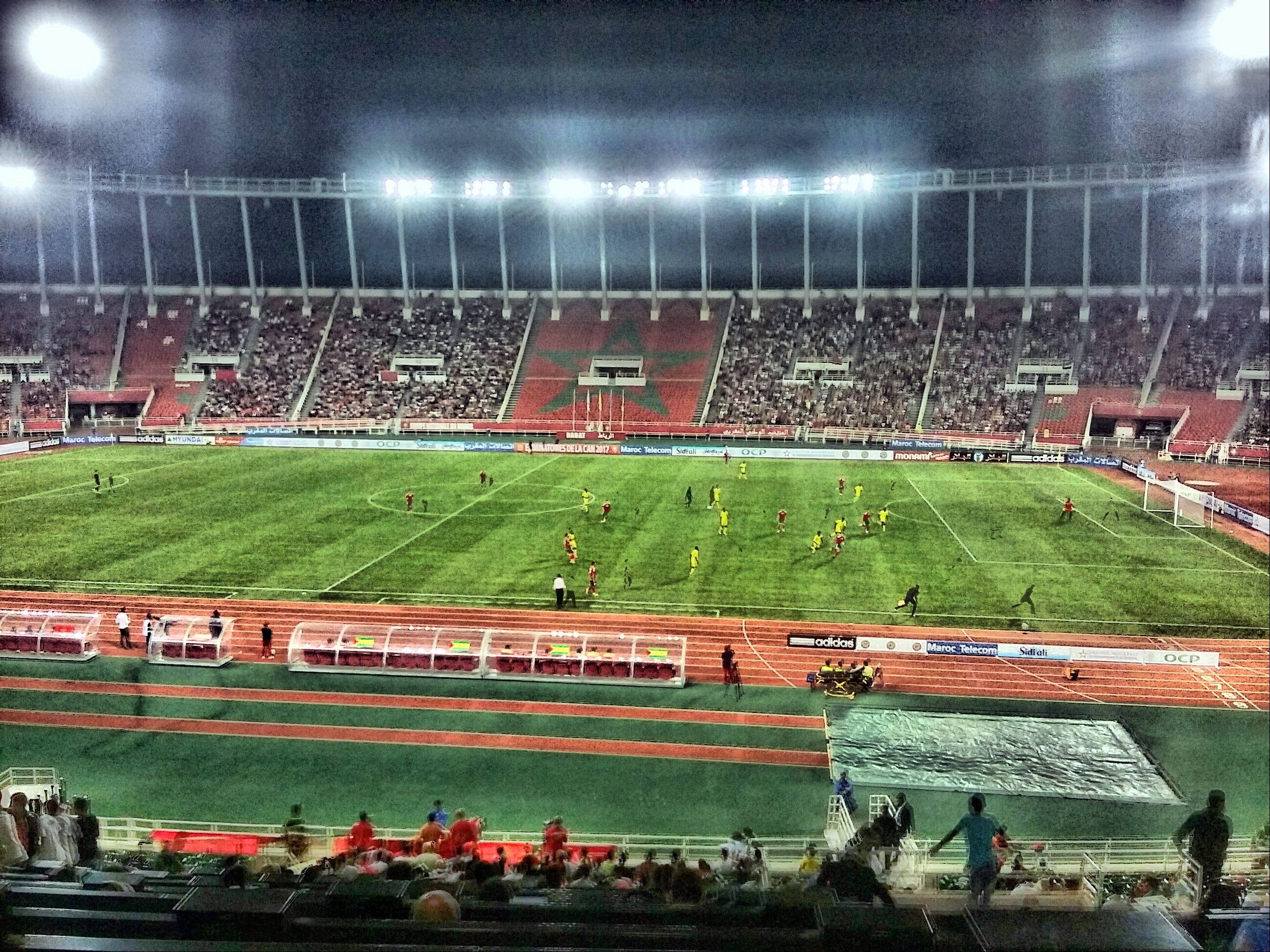

The stadium was constructed by a Chinese company when the ground was first broke in 1980 and was built over three years being completed in 1983. It was the home ground of AS FAR and used mostly for football matches. It also staged athletics. The stadium had a capacity of 50,000 people.

From 2008 to 2023, it hosted the Meeting International Mohammed VI d'Athlétisme de Rabat. It was a confirmed venue for the 2015 Africa Cup of Nations until Morocco was stripped of its hosting rights. Morocco asked for the Africa Cup of Nations to be postponed because of fear of the Ebola pandemic that was affecting several African countries at the time.

The Prince Moulay Abdellah Stadium was also a venue for the 2014 FIFA Club World Cup.

It was also used as the opening and closing ceremony venue for the 2019 African Games after Malabo, Equatorial Guinea withdrew its rights to host the African Games.

=== Replacement ===
A new stadium has been built after the original from 1983 was demolished in August 2023. The venue constructed on the same site was one of the venues for the 2025 Africa Cup of Nations after Guinea was stripped of its hosting rights. The new venue is also planned to be one of the host stadiums for the 2030 FIFA World Cup which Morocco will co-host along with Portugal and Spain.

== Notable international events ==
The stadium hosted the following international events:

- 1988 African Cup of Nations
- 2014 FIFA Club World Cup
- 2019 African Games
- 2020 CAF Confederation Cup Final
- 2020 Arab Club Champions Cup Final
- 2022 Women's Africa Cup of Nations Final
- 2022 CAF Super Cup
- 2022 CAF Women's Champions League Final
- 2022 FIFA Club World Cup
- 2023 U-23 Africa Cup of Nations Final

== See also ==
- List of African stadiums by capacity
- List of football stadiums in Morocco
- List of association football stadiums by capacity

Preceded by Stade Municipal de Kintélé	African Games; Venue; 2019	Succeeded by current
