= Boniface Haba =

Guinean footballer

Personal information
- Date of birth: 30 September 1996 (age 30)
- Place of birth: Kindia, Guinea
- Height: 1.75 m (5 ft 9 in)
- Position: Winger

Team information
- Current team: AmaZulu
- Number: 29

Senior career*
Years	Team	Apps	(Gls)
2013–2015	Gangan		
2015–2020	Horoya		
2022–2024	Olympic Safi	45	(7)
2024–	AmaZulu	6	(0)

International career^{‡}
2015–2020	Guinea	8	(0)
- * Club domestic league appearances and goals as of 28 January 2025 ‡ National team caps and goals as of 28 January 2025

Boniface Haba (born 30 September 1996) is a Guinean footballer who plays as a winger for Amazulu F.C. He has been capped for the Guinea national team.

== International career ==
Haba made his debut with the Guinea national team in a 2–0 2016 African Nations Championship qualification win over Senegal on 17 October 2015.
