= 2019–20 CAF Confederation Cup qualifying rounds =

- Dates: 9 August – 5 November 2019

Tournament statistics
- Matches played: 106
- Goals scored: 255 (2.41 per match)

The 2019–20 CAF Confederation Cup qualifying rounds were played from 9 August to 5 November 2019. A total of 69 teams competed in the international football qualifying rounds to decide the 16 places in the group stage of the 2019–20 CAF Confederation Cup.

== Draw ==
The draw for the preliminary round and first round was held on 21 July 2019 at the CAF headquarters in Cairo, Egypt.

The entry round of the 53 teams entered into the draw was determined by their performances in the CAF competitions for the previous five seasons (CAF 5-year ranking points shown in parentheses).

Entry round	First round (11 teams)	Preliminary round (42 teams)
Teams	(Morocco) RS Berkane (28 pts); (Tunisia) CS Sfaxien (21.5 pts); (Egypt) Al-Masry (Note: The teams from Egypt were listed as Egypt 1 (Al-Masry) and Egypt 2 (Pyramids) at the time of the qualifying round draw as the identity of the teams had not been confirmed.) (12 pts); (Morocco) Hassania Agadir (10 pts); (Zambia) Zanaco (6 pts); (Nigeria) Enugu Rangers (5 pts); (Burkina Faso) Salitas (2.5 pts); (Mali) Djoliba (2 pts); (South Africa) Bidvest Wits; (Ivory Coast) FC San Pédro; (Madagascar) CNaPS Sport	(Tunisia) US Ben Guerdane; (Egypt) Pyramids; (Algeria) Paradou AC; (Algeria) CR Belouizdad; (Democratic Republic of the Congo) DC Motema Pembe; (Democratic Republic of the Congo) AS Maniema Union; (South Africa) TS Galaxy; (Zambia) Buildcon; (Sudan) Al-Ahly Shendi; (Sudan) Al-Khartoum; (Nigeria) Niger Tornadoes; (Guinea) Santoba; (Guinea) CI Kamsar; (Tanzania) Azam; (Tanzania) KMC; (Kenya) Bandari; (Republic of the Congo) Étoile du Congo; (Uganda) Proline; (Libya) Al-Ittihad; (Ghana) Ashanti Gold; (Rwanda) AS Kigali; (Zimbabwe) Triangle United; (Eswatini) Young Buffaloes; (Ethiopia) Fasil Kenema (Note: The team from Ethiopia was listed as Ethiopia 1 at the time of the qualifying round draw as the identity of the team had not been confirmed.); (Botswana) Jwaneng Galaxy; (Togo) Maranatha; (Cameroon) Stade Renard de Melong; (Gabon) AS Pélican; (Benin) ESAE; (Burundi) Rukinzo; (Chad) AS CotonTchad; (Djibouti) Arta/Solar7; (Equatorial Guinea) Akonangui; (Liberia) LISCR; (Malawi) Masters Security; (Mauritania) ASC Snim; (Mauritius) Bolton City; (Niger) USGN; (Seychelles) Saint Louis Suns United; (Somalia) Mogadishu City; (South Sudan) Amarat United; (Zanzibar) Malindi

== Format ==
In the qualifying rounds, each tie was played on a home-and-away two-legged basis. If the aggregate score was tied after the second leg, the away goals rule was applied, and if still tied, extra time was not played, and the penalty shoot-out was used to determine the winner (Regulations III. 13 & 14).

== Schedule ==
The schedule of the competition was as follows.

Round	First leg	Second leg
Preliminary round	9–11 August 2019	23–25 August 2019
First round	13–15 September 2019	27–29 September 2019
Play-off round	27 October 2019	3 November 2019

== Bracket ==
The bracket of the draw was announced by the CAF on 21 July 2019. The 16 winners of the first round advanced to the play-off round, where they were joined by the 16 losers of the Champions League first round.

Preliminary round
1	(Mauritania) ASC Snim	0	0	0
4	(Benin) ESAE	5	2	7
3	(Burkina Faso) Salitas	Bye
2

First round
(Benin) ESAE (p)	0	0	0 (3)
(Burkina Faso) Salitas	0	0	0 (2)

Preliminary round
1	(Niger) USGN	1	0	1
4	(Libya) Al-Ittihad	1	2	3
3	(Morocco) Hassania Agadir	Bye
2

First round
(Libya) Al-Ittihad	1	0	1
(Morocco) Hassania Agadir (a)	1	0	1

Preliminary round
1	(Togo) Maranatha	3	0	3
4	(Liberia) LISCR	0	0	0
3	(Mali) Djoliba	Bye
2

First round
(Togo) Maranatha	1	1	2
(Mali) Djoliba	2	1	3

Preliminary round
1	(Gabon) AS Pélican (p)	1	1	2 (4)
4	(Democratic Republic of the Congo) AS Maniema Union	1	1	2 (1)
3	(Nigeria) Enugu Rangers	Bye
2

First round
(Gabon) AS Pélican	2	1	3
(Nigeria) Enugu Rangers	1	3	4

Preliminary round
1	(Algeria) Paradou AC	3	0	3
4	(Guinea) CI Kamsar	0	1	1
3	(Tunisia) CS Sfaxien	Bye
2

First round
(Algeria) Paradou AC	3	0	3
(Tunisia) CS Sfaxien	1	0	1

Preliminary round
1	(Mauritius) Bolton City	3	0	3
4	(Botswana) Jwaneng Galaxy	1	1	2
3	(Zambia) Zanaco	Bye
2

First round
(Mauritius) Bolton City	1	0	1
(Zambia) Zanaco	2	3	5

Preliminary round
1	(Somalia) Mogadishu City	0	0	0
4	(Zanzibar) Malindi	0	1	1
3	(Egypt) Al-Masry	Bye
2

First round
(Zanzibar) Malindi	1	1	2
(Egypt) Al-Masry	4	3	7

Preliminary round
1	(Equatorial Guinea) Akonangui	1	0	1
4	(Ghana) Ashanti Gold	1	3	4
3	(Morocco) RS Berkane	Bye
2

First round
(Ghana) Ashanti Gold	3	0	3
(Morocco) RS Berkane	2	2	4

Preliminary round
1	(Nigeria) Niger Tornadoes	1	3	4
4	(Guinea) Santoba	2	3	5
3	(Ivory Coast) FC San Pédro	Bye
2

First round
(Guinea) Santoba	0	0	0
(Ivory Coast) FC San Pédro	0	3	3

Preliminary round
1	(South Africa) TS Galaxy	1	1	2
4	(Seychelles) Saint Louis Suns United	0	0	0
3	(Madagascar) CNaPS Sport	Bye
2

First round
(South Africa) TS Galaxy	1	3	4
(Madagascar) CNaPS Sport	0	1	1

Preliminary round
1	(Zambia) Buildcon	0	1	1
4	(Eswatini) Young Buffaloes	1	1	2
3	(South Africa) Bidvest Wits	Bye
2

First round
(Eswatini) Young Buffaloes	1	0	1
(South Africa) Bidvest Wits	0	3	3

Preliminary round
1	(Djibouti) Arta/Solar7	1	0	1
4	(Sudan) Al-Khartoum	1	3	4
3	(Democratic Republic of the Congo) DC Motema Pembe	2	2	4
2	(Cameroon) Stade Renard de Melong	0	0	0

First round
(Sudan) Al-Khartoum	1	2	3 (1)
(Democratic Republic of the Congo) DC Motema Pembe	2	1	3 (3)

Preliminary round
1	(Rwanda) AS Kigali	0	2	2
4	(Tanzania) KMC	0	1	1
3	(Uganda) Proline	3	0	3
2	(Malawi) Masters Security	0	0	0

First round
(Rwanda) AS Kigali	1	1	2
(Uganda) Proline	1	2	3

Preliminary round
1	(Kenya) Bandari (a)	0	1	1
4	(Sudan) Al-Ahly Shendi	0	1	1
3	(Tunisia) US Ben Guerdane	5	0	5
2	(South Sudan) Amarat United	1	0	1

First round
(Kenya) Bandari	2	1	3
(Tunisia) US Ben Guerdane	0	2	2

Preliminary round
1	(Ethiopia) Fasil Kenema	1	1	2
4	(Tanzania) Azam	0	3	3
3	(Zimbabwe) Triangle United	5	0	5
2	(Burundi) Rukinzo	0	0	0

First round
(Tanzania) Azam	0	0	0
(Zimbabwe) Triangle United	1	1	2

Preliminary round
1	(Egypt) Pyramids	4	1	5
4	(Republic of the Congo) Étoile du Congo	1	0	1
3	(Algeria) CR Belouizdad	2	2	4
2	(Chad) AS CotonTchad	0	0	0

First round
(Egypt) Pyramids	1	1	2
(Algeria) CR Belouizdad	1	0	1

== Preliminary round ==
The preliminary round included the 42 teams that did not receive byes to the first round.

Team 1	Agg.	Team 2	1st leg	2nd leg
ASC Snim (Mauritania)	0–7	(Benin) ESAE	0–5	0–2
USGN (Niger)	1–3	(Libya) Al-Ittihad	1–1	0–2
Maranatha (Togo)	3–0	(Liberia) LISCR	3–0	0–0
AS Pélican (Gabon)	2–2 (4–1 p)	(Democratic Republic of the Congo) AS Maniema Union	1–1	1–1
Paradou AC (Algeria)	3–1	(Guinea) CI Kamsar	3–0	0–1
Bolton City (Mauritius)	3–2	(Botswana) Jwaneng Galaxy	3–1	0–1
Mogadishu City (Somalia)	0–1	(Zanzibar) Malindi	0–0	0–1
Akonangui (Equatorial Guinea)	1–4	(Ghana) Ashanti Gold	1–1	0–3
Niger Tornadoes (Nigeria)	4–5	(Guinea) Santoba	1–2	3–3
TS Galaxy (South Africa)	2–0	(Seychelles) Saint Louis Suns United	1–0	1–0
Buildcon (Zambia)	1–2	(Eswatini) Young Buffaloes	0–1	1–1
Arta/Solar7 (Djibouti)	1–4	(Sudan) Al-Khartoum	1–1	0–3
DC Motema Pembe (Democratic Republic of the Congo)	4–0	(Cameroon) Stade Renard de Melong	2–0	2–0
AS Kigali (Rwanda)	2–1	(Tanzania) KMC	0–0	2–1
Proline (Uganda)	3–0	(Malawi) Masters Security	3–0	0–0
Bandari (Kenya)	1–1 (a)	(Sudan) Al-Ahly Shendi	0–0	1–1
US Ben Guerdane (Tunisia)	5–1	(South Sudan) Amarat United	5–1	0–0
Fasil Kenema (Ethiopia)	2–3	(Tanzania) Azam	1–0	1–3
Triangle United (Zimbabwe)	5–0	(Burundi) Rukinzo	5–0	0–0
Pyramids (Egypt)	5–1	(Republic of the Congo) Étoile du Congo	4–1	1–0
CR Belouizdad (Algeria)	4–0	(Chad) AS CotonTchad	2–0	2–0

10 August 2019
17:00 UTC+0

ASC Snim (Mauritania)	0–5	(Benin) ESAE
	Report	Dah-Atchèfon 12', 63'; Akplogan 48'; Sewa 56'; Linkpon 59'

Stade Cheikha Ould Boïdiya, Nouakchott
Referee: Gaoussou Kané (Mali)
24 August 2019
16:00 UTC+1

ESAE (Benin)	2–0	(Mauritania) ASC Snim
Oussou 10'; Onyenwen 88'	Report

Stade René Pleven, Cotonou
Referee: Abdullahi Shuaibu (Nigeria)

ESAE won 7–0 on aggregate.

11 August 2019
16:30 UTC+1

USGN (Niger)	1–1	(Libya) Al-Ittihad
Amadou 13'	Report	El Khritli 6'

Stade Général Seyni Kountché, Niamey
Referee: Raphiou Ligali (Benin)
25 August 2019
17:00 UTC+1

Al-Ittihad (Libya)	2–0	(Niger) USGN
Zubya 24'; ? 86'	Report

Stade Chedly Zouiten, Tunis (Tunisia) (Note: Teams from Libya played their home matches outside the country due to security concerns from the ongoing civil war.)
Referee: Karim Sabry (Morocco)

Al-Ittihad won 3–1 on aggregate.

11 August 2019
15:00 UTC+0

Maranatha (Togo)	3–0	(Liberia) LISCR
Asamoah 34' (pen.); Yacoubou 55'; Salifou 87' (pen.)	Report

Stade de Kégué, Lomé
Referee: Kouassi Biro (Ivory Coast)
25 August 2019
15:30 UTC+0

LISCR (Liberia)	0–0	(Togo) Maranatha
	Report

Antoinette Tubman Stadium, Monrovia
Referee: Younoussa Tawel Camara (Guinea)

Maranatha won 3–0 on aggregate.

10 August 2019
15:30 UTC+1

AS Pélican (Gabon)	1–1	(Democratic Republic of the Congo) AS Maniema Union
Boundonga 51'	Report	Bisamuna 65' (o.g.)

Stade d'Angondjé, Libreville
Referee: Auladyo Pariz (São Tomé and Príncipe)
25 August 2019
15:00 UTC+2

AS Maniema Union (Democratic Republic of the Congo)	1–1	(Gabon) AS Pélican
Kilangalanga 55'	Report	Emery 13'
Penalties
	1–4

Referee: Joaquín Esono Eyang (Equatorial Guinea)

2–2 on aggregate. AS Pélican won 4–1 on penalties.

9 August 2019
20:45 UTC+1

Paradou AC (Algeria)	3–0	(Guinea) CI Kamsar
Ghorab 20'; Bouzok 54'; Benayad 90+1'	Report

Stade du 5 Juillet, Algiers
Referee: Abdulwahid Huraywidah (Libya)
24 August 2019
16:00 UTC+0

CI Kamsar (Guinea)	1–0	(Algeria) Paradou AC
Sosah 82'	Report

Stade du 28 Septembre, Conakry
Referee: Dawdu Williams (Sierra Leone)

Paradou AC won 3–1 on aggregate.

11 August 2019
15:00 UTC+4

Bolton City (Mauritius)	3–1	(Botswana) Jwaneng Galaxy
Paeye 17' (o.g.); M’poue 65'; Kee 90+3'	Report	Kaunda 90+1'

Stade George V, Curepipe
Referee: Eugene Mdluli (South Africa)
25 August 2019
15:45 UTC+2

Jwaneng Galaxy (Botswana)	1–0	(Mauritius) Bolton City
Moyo 70'	Report

Lobatse Stadium, Lobatse
Referee: Paulo Sérgio Moreira (Angola)

Bolton City won 3–2 on aggregate.

11 August 2019
15:00 UTC+3

Mogadishu City (Somalia)	0–0	(Zanzibar) Malindi
	Report

Amaan Stadium, Zanzibar City (Zanzibar) (Note: Teams from Somalia played their home matches outside the country due to security concerns from the ongoing civil war.)
Referee: Alier Michael James (South Sudan)
24 August 2019
16:00 UTC+3

Malindi (Zanzibar)	1–0	(Somalia) Mogadishu City
Mosi 71'	Report

Amaan Stadium, Zanzibar City
Referee: Eric Manirakiza (Burundi)

Malindi won 1–0 on aggregate.

10 August 2019
16:00 UTC+1

Akonangui (Equatorial Guinea)	1–1	(Ghana) Ashanti Gold
Mbele 75'	Report	Agyemang 55'

Estadio de Ebibeyin, Ebibeyin
Referee: Jean Pierre Nguiene Bissila (Congo)
24 August 2019
15:00 UTC+0

Ashanti Gold (Ghana)	3–0	(Equatorial Guinea) Akonangui
Shafiu 2' (pen.), 7', 10'	Report

Len Clay Stadium, Obuasi
Referee: Abdoulaye Al-Moustapha (Niger)

Ashanti Gold won 4–1 on aggregate.

10 August 2019
16:00 UTC+1

Niger Tornadoes (Nigeria)	1–2	(Guinea) Santoba
Zaki 58' (pen.)	Report	Kamara 37'; Babawo 48'

Ahmadu Bello Stadium, Kaduna
Referee: Boureima Sanogo (Burkina Faso)
23 August 2019
16:00 UTC+0

Santoba (Guinea)	3–3	(Nigeria) Niger Tornadoes
Bah 25'; Siby 35'; Kamara 80'	Report	Alebiosu 15', 29'; Zaki 84'

Stade du 28 Septembre, Conakry
Referee: Hassan Corneh (Liberia)

Santoba won 5–4 on aggregate.

11 August 2019
15:00 UTC+2

TS Galaxy (South Africa)	1–0	(Seychelles) Saint Louis Suns United
Mdlinzo 45'	Report

Mbombela Stadium, Mbombela
Referee: Ali Mohamed Adelaid (Comoros)
25 August 2019
16:00 UTC+4

Saint Louis Suns United (Seychelles)	0–1	(South Africa) TS Galaxy
	Report	Setsile 53'

Stade Linité, Victoria
Referee: Ganesh Chutooree (Mauritius)

TS Galaxy won 2–0 on aggregate.

10 August 2019
15:00 UTC+2

Buildcon (Zambia)	0–1	(Eswatini) Young Buffaloes
	Report	Dlamini 42'

Levy Mwanawasa Stadium, Ndola
Referee: Brighton Chimene (Zimbabwe)
23 August 2019
15:00 UTC+2

Young Buffaloes (Eswatini)	1–1	(Zambia) Buildcon
Mamba 55'	Report	Kayembe 1'

Mavuso Sports Centre, Manzini
Referee: Osiase Koto (Lesotho)

Young Buffaloes won 2–1 on aggregate.

11 August 2019
18:00 UTC+3

Arta/Solar7 (Djibouti)	1–1	(Sudan) Al-Khartoum
Koman 88'	Report	Pretino 62'

Stade El Hadj Hassan Gouled, Djibouti City
Referee: Lemma Nigussi (Ethiopia)
23 August 2019
18:00 UTC+2

Al-Khartoum (Sudan)	3–0	(Djibouti) Arta/Solar7
Karshom 48' (pen.); Eldin 89'; Pretino 90+2'	Report

Al-Merrikh Stadium, Omdurman

Al-Khartoum won 4–1 on aggregate.

12 August 2019 (Note: The DC Motema Pembe v Stade Renard de Melong was postponed from 11 August to 12 August due to travel difficulties of Stade Renard de Melong.)
15:30 UTC+1

DC Motema Pembe (Democratic Republic of the Congo)	2–0	(Cameroon) Stade Renard de Melong
Koné 68', 82'	Report

Stade des Martyrs, Kinshasa
Referee: Alhadj Allaou Mahamat (Chad)
25 August 2019
15:30 UTC+1

Stade Renard de Melong (Cameroon)	0–2	(Democratic Republic of the Congo) DC Motema Pembe
	Report	Koné 14'; Gikanji 28'

Stade Ahmadou Ahidjo, Yaoundé
Referee: Pierre Atcho (Gabon)

DC Motema Pembe won 4–0 on aggregate.

10 August 2019
15:00 UTC+2

AS Kigali (Rwanda)	0–0	(Tanzania) KMC
	Report

Amahoro Stadium, Kigali
Referee: Diraneh Guedi (Djibouti)
23 August 2019
14:00 UTC+3

KMC (Tanzania)	1–2	(Rwanda) AS Kigali
Ndikumana 87' (pen.)	Report	Kalisa 30'; Nsabimana 64'

National Stadium, Dar es Salaam
Referee: Sabri Fadul (Sudan)

AS Kigali won 2–1 on aggregate.

10 August 2019
16:00 UTC+3

Proline (Uganda)	3–0	(Malawi) Masters Security
Bogere 18', 57', 81'	Report

Startimes Stadium, Kampala
Referee: Nsoro Ruzindana (Rwanda)
24 August 2019
16:30 UTC+2

Masters Security (Malawi)	0–0	(Uganda) Proline
	Report

Bingu National Stadium, Lilongwe
Referee: Thulani Sibandze (Eswatini)

Proline won 3–0 on aggregate.

10 August 2019
15:00 UTC+3

Bandari (Kenya)	0–0	(Sudan) Al-Ahly Shendi
	Report

Moi International Sports Centre, Kasarani
Referee: Nur Muhudin (Somalia)
23 August 2019
19:30 UTC+2

Al-Ahly Shendi (Sudan)	1–1	(Kenya) Bandari
Mozamil 65'	Report	Mozamil 27' (o.g.)

Shendi Stadium, Shendi
Referee: Tsegay Mogos (Eritrea)

1–1 on aggregate. Bandari won on away goals.

11 August 2019
16:30 UTC+1

US Ben Guerdane (Tunisia)	5–1	(South Sudan) Amarat United
Attia 2'; Melo 13', 48'; Ricardinho 79', 81'	Report	? 57'

Stade du 7 Mars, Ben Gardane
Referee: Ahmed Sekou Touré (Guinea)
25 August 2019
19:00 UTC+3

Amarat United (South Sudan)	0–0	(Tunisia) US Ben Guerdane
	Report

Startimes Stadium, Lugogo (Uganda) (Note: Teams from South Sudan played their home matches outside the country due to renovation of Juba Stadium.)
Referee: Mfaume Nassoro (Tanzania)

US Ben Guerdane won 5–1 on aggregate.

11 August 2019
16:00 UTC+3

Fasil Kenema (Ethiopia)	1–0	(Tanzania) Azam
Meleyo 45+3'	Report

Bahir Dar Stadium, Bahir Dar
Referee: Elsiddig El Treefe (Sudan)
24 August 2019
22:00 UTC+3

Azam (Tanzania)	3–1	(Ethiopia) Fasil Kenema
Djodi 23', 32'; Chirwa 59'	Report	Kassim 38'

Chamazi Stadium, Dar es Salaam
Referee: Andrew Otieno (Kenya)

Azam won 3–2 on aggregate.

11 August 2019
15:00 UTC+2

Triangle United (Zimbabwe)	5–0	(Burundi) Rukinzo
Tavarwisa 7', 36'; Kawondera 41'; January 48'; Chintuli 90'	Report

Barbourfields Stadium, Bulawayo
Referee: Audrick Nkole (Zambia)
24 August 2019
15:00 UTC+2

Rukinzo (Burundi)	0–0	(Zimbabwe) Triangle United
	Report

Prince Louis Rwagasore Stadium, Bujumbura

Triangle United won 5–0 on aggregate.

10 August 2019
20:00 UTC+2

Pyramids (Egypt)	4–1	(Republic of the Congo) Étoile du Congo
Antwi 19', 33'; Traoré 22'; Ali 90+3' (pen.)	Report	Mukumbu 89'

30 June Stadium, Cairo
Referee: Lyes Bekouassa (Algeria)
25 August 2019
16:30 UTC+1

Étoile du Congo (Republic of the Congo)	0–1	(Egypt) Pyramids
	Report	Issa 32'

Stade Alphonse Massemba-Débat, Brazzaville
Referee: Jean-Marc Ganamandji (Central African Republic)

Pyramids won 5–1 on aggregate.

10 August 2019
20:45 UTC+1

CR Belouizdad (Algeria)	2–0	(Chad) AS CotonTchad
Gasmi 22'; Sayoud 82'	Report

Stade du 5 Juillet, Algiers
Referee: Mutaz Al-Shalmani (Libya)
24 August 2019
17:00 UTC+1

AS CotonTchad (Chad)	0–2	(Algeria) CR Belouizdad
	Report	Belahouel 2'; Sayoud 67'

Stade Omnisports Idriss Mahamat Ouya, N'Djamena
Referee: Antoine Effa Essouma (Cameroon)

CR Belouizdad won 4–0 on aggregate.

== First round ==
The first round, also called the second preliminary round, included 32 teams: the 11 teams that received byes to this round, and the 21 winners of the preliminary round.

Team 1	Agg.	Team 2	1st leg	2nd leg
ESAE (Benin)	0–0 (3–2 p)	(Burkina Faso) Salitas	0–0	0–0
Al-Ittihad (Libya)	1–1 (a)	(Morocco) Hassania Agadir	1–1	0–0
Maranatha (Togo)	2–3	(Mali) Djoliba	1–2	1–1
AS Pélican (Gabon)	3–4	(Nigeria) Enugu Rangers	2–1	1–3
Paradou AC (Algeria)	3–1	(Tunisia) CS Sfaxien	3–1	0–0
Bolton City (Mauritius)	1–5	(Zambia) Zanaco	1–2	0–3
Malindi (Zanzibar)	2–7	(Egypt) Al-Masry	1–4	1–3
Ashanti Gold (Ghana)	3–4	(Morocco) RS Berkane	3–2	0–2
Santoba (Guinea)	0–3	(Ivory Coast) FC San Pédro	0–0	0–3
TS Galaxy (South Africa)	4–1	(Madagascar) CNaPS Sport	1–0	3–1
Young Buffaloes (Eswatini)	1–3	(South Africa) Bidvest Wits	1–0	0–3
Al-Khartoum (Sudan)	3–3 (1–3 p)	(Democratic Republic of the Congo) DC Motema Pembe	1–2	2–1
AS Kigali (Rwanda)	2–3	(Uganda) Proline	1–1	1–2
Bandari (Kenya)	3–2	(Tunisia) US Ben Guerdane	2–0	1–2
Azam (Tanzania)	0–2	(Zimbabwe) Triangle United	0–1	0–1
Pyramids (Egypt)	2–1	(Algeria) CR Belouizdad	1–1	1–0

15 September 2019
16:00 UTC+1

ESAE (Benin)	0–0	(Burkina Faso) Salitas
	Report

Stade René Pleven, Cotonou
Referee: Blaise Ngwa (Cameroon)
28 September 2019
16:00 UTC+0

Salitas (Burkina Faso)	0–0	(Benin) ESAE
	Report
Penalties
	2–3

Stade du 4 Août, Ouagadougou
Referee: Nabil Boukhalfa (Algeria)

0–0 on aggregate. ESAE won 3–2 on penalties.

14 September 2019
17:00 UTC+1

Al-Ittihad (Libya)	1–1	(Morocco) Hassania Agadir
Sabbou 79'	Report	Bouftini 34'

Stade Taïeb Mhiri, Sfax (Tunisia)
Referee: Daouda Gueye (Senegal)
28 September 2019
20:00 UTC+1

Hassania Agadir (Morocco)	0–0	(Libya) Al-Ittihad
	Report

Stade Adrar, Agadir
Referee: Youssef Essrayri (Tunisia)

1–1 on aggregate. Hassania Agadir won on away goals.

14 September 2019
16:00 UTC+0

Maranatha (Togo)	1–2	(Mali) Djoliba
Owusu 11'	Report	Coulibaly 19', 75'

Stade de Kégué, Lomé
Referee: Mahmoud El Banna (Egypt)
29 September 2019
16:00 UTC+0

Djoliba (Mali)	1–1	(Togo) Maranatha
Ekwa 90+4'	Report	Salifou 86'

Stade Modibo Kéïta, Bamako
Referee: Noureddine El Jaafari (Morocco)

Djoliba won 3–2 on aggregate.

14 September 2019
15:30 UTC+1

AS Pélican (Gabon)	2–1	(Nigeria) Enugu Rangers
Yanga 13'; Sané 22' (o.g.)	Report	Egbujor 25'

Stade Augustin Monédan de Sibang, Libreville
Referee: Thierry Nkurunziza (Burundi)
29 September 2019
16:00 UTC+1

Enugu Rangers (Nigeria)	3–1	(Gabon) AS Pélican
George 18'; Egbujor 51'; Oluwoyin 57'	Report	Dertin 6'

Nnamdi Azikiwe Stadium, Enugu
Referee: Jean Marc Ganamandji (Central African Republic)

Enugu Rangers won 4–3 on aggregate.

15 September 2019
20:45 UTC+1

Paradou AC (Algeria)	3–1	(Tunisia) CS Sfaxien
Mouali 13'; Ghorab 61'; Bouzok 78' (pen.)	Report	Marzouki 2'

Stade du 5 Juillet 1962, Algiers
Referee: Fabricio Duarte (Cape Verde)
29 September 2019
18:00 UTC+1

CS Sfaxien (Tunisia)	0–0	(Algeria) Paradou AC
	Report

Stade Taïeb Mhiri, Sfax
Referee: Adil Zourak (Morocco)

Paradou AC won 3–1 on aggregate.

15 September 2019
15:00 UTC+4

Bolton City (Mauritius)	1–2	(Zambia) Zanaco
M’poue 51'	Report	Rusike 27' (pen.); Kola 29'

Anjalay Stadium, Belle Vue Harel
Referee: Mfaume Nassoro (Tanzania)
28 September 2019
15:00 UTC+2

Zanaco (Zambia)	3–0	(Mauritius) Bolton City
Okutu 25'; Manziba 58'; Kola 84'	Report

National Heroes Stadium, Lusaka
Referee: Nehemia Shoovaleka (Namibia)

Zanaco won 5–1 on aggregate.

15 September 2019
16:15 UTC+3

Malindi (Zanzibar)	1–4	(Egypt) Al-Masry
Ali 45'	Report	Wadi 27', 41', 54'; Ali 33'

Amaan Stadium, Zanzibar City
Referee: Mashood Ssali (Uganda)
29 September 2019
15:00 UTC+2

Al-Masry (Egypt)	3–1	(Zanzibar) Malindi
Yasser 4', 56'; Amutu 60'	Report	Ali 33'

Borg El Arab Stadium, Alexandria
Referee: Sabri Fadul (Sudan)

Al-Masry won 7–2 on aggregate.

14 September 2019
15:00 UTC+0

Ashanti Gold (Ghana)	3–2	(Morocco) RS Berkane
Donkor 15'; Shafiu 43'; Addai 60'	Report	Aziz 51'; Laachir 57'

Len Clay Stadium, Obuasi
Referee: Issa Sy (Senegal)
28 September 2019
21:00 UTC+1

RS Berkane (Morocco)	2–0	(Ghana) Ashanti Gold
Dayo 31'; Krouch 45'	Report

Stade Municipal de Berkane, Berkane
Referee: Abdoul Karim Twagirumukiza (Rwanda)

RS Berkane won 4–3 on aggregate.

15 September 2019
16:00 UTC+0

Santoba (Guinea)	0–0	(Ivory Coast) FC San Pédro
	Report

Stade du 28 Septembre, Conakry
Referee: Mohamed Ali Moussa (Niger)
29 September 2019
16:00 UTC+0

FC San Pédro (Ivory Coast)	3–0	(Guinea) Santoba
Agboke 20' (pen.); Kramo 64'; Mbondi 90+1'	Report

Stade Félix Houphouët-Boigny, Abidjan
Referee: Louis Houngnandande (Benin)

FC San Pédro won 3–0 on aggregate.

15 September 2019
15:00 UTC+2

TS Galaxy (South Africa)	1–0	(Madagascar) CNaPS Sport
Barns 5'	Report

Mbombela Stadium, Mbombela
Referee: Thulani Sibandze (Eswatini)
28 September 2019
14:30 UTC+3

CNaPS Sport (Madagascar)	1–3	(South Africa) TS Galaxy
Niasexe 90'	Report	Shangase 19'; Barns 55', 85'

CNaPS Stadium, Antananarivo
Referee: Anthony Ogwayo (Kenya)

TS Galaxy won 4–1 on aggregate.

14 September 2019
15:30 UTC+2

Young Buffaloes (Eswatini)	1–0	(South Africa) Bidvest Wits
Mamba 29'	Report

Mavuso Sports Centre, Manzini
Referee: Osiase Koto (Lesotho)
27 September 2019
19:00 UTC+2

Bidvest Wits (South Africa)	3–0	(Eswatini) Young Buffaloes
Motupa 22', 27'; Dzvukamanja 83'	Report

Bidvest Stadium, Johannesburg
Referee: Ishmael Chizinga (Malawi)

Bidvest Wits won 3–1 on aggregate.

13 September 2019
19:00 UTC+2

Al-Khartoum (Sudan)	1–2	(Democratic Republic of the Congo) DC Motema Pembe
Tronbil 72'	Report	Ngouelou 61'; Loko 88'

Al-Merrikh Stadium, Omdurman
Referee: Lazard Tsiba (Congo)
27 September 2019
15:30 UTC+1

DC Motema Pembe (Democratic Republic of the Congo)	1–2	(Sudan) Al-Khartoum
Bongonga 24'	Report	Tronbil 4'; Pretino 54'
Penalties
	3–1

Stade des Martyrs, Kinshasa
Referee: Omar Abdulkadir Artan (Somalia)

3–3 on aggregate. DC Motema Pembe won 3–1 on penalties.

14 September 2019
15:00 UTC+2

AS Kigali (Rwanda)	1–1	(Uganda) Proline
Ssentongo 87' (pen.)	Report	Anukani 48'

Stade Régional Nyamirambo, Kigali
Referee: Ring Malong (South Sudan)
28 September 2019
16:00 UTC+3

Proline (Uganda)	2–1	(Rwanda) AS Kigali
Bogere 12', 15'	Report	Ssentongo 85'

Startimes Stadium, Kampala
Referee: Joaquín Esono Eyang (Equatorial Guinea)

Proline won 3–2 on aggregate.

14 September 2019
15:00 UTC+3

Bandari (Kenya)	2–0	(Tunisia) US Ben Guerdane
Yema 73'; Abdallah 78'	Report

Moi International Sports Centre, Kasarani
Referee: Alhadi Allaou Mahamat (Chad)
29 September 2019
15:30 UTC+1

US Ben Guerdane (Tunisia)	2–1	(Kenya) Bandari
Ricardinho 5', 22'; Wadri 89'	Report

Stade du 7 Mars, Ben Gardane
Referee: Mutaz Ibrahim (Libya)

Bandari won 3–2 on aggregate.

15 September 2019
16:00 UTC+3

Azam (Tanzania)	0–1	(Zimbabwe) Triangle United
	Report	Kawondera 35'

Chamazi Stadium, Dar es Salaam
Referee: Jean Claude Ishimwe (Rwanda)
28 September 2019
15:00 UTC+2

Triangle United (Zimbabwe)	1–0	(Tanzania) Azam
Mavhunga 86'	Report

Barbourfields Stadium, Bulawayo
Referee: Abdoul Ohabee Kanoso (Madagascar)

Triangle United won 2–0 on aggregate.

14 September 2019
20:00 UTC+2

Pyramids (Egypt)	1–1	(Algeria) CR Belouizdad
Farouk 75'	Report	Sayoud 65'

30 June Stadium, Cairo
Referee: Janny Sikazwe (Zambia)
29 September 2019
17:45 UTC+1

CR Belouizdad (Algeria)	0–1	(Egypt) Pyramids
	Report	Antwi 66'

Stade du 5 Juillet 1962, Algiers
Referee: Samir Guezzaz (Morocco)

Pyramids won 2–1 on aggregate.

== Play-off round ==
The play-off round, also called the additional second preliminary round, included 32 teams: the 16 winners of the Confederation Cup first round, and the 16 losers of the Champions League first round. The draw for the play-off round was held on 9 October 2019, 19:00 CAT (UTC+2), at the Hilton Pyramids Golf in Cairo, Egypt. The winners of the Confederation Cup first round were drawn against the losers of the Champions League first round, with the teams from the Confederation Cup hosting the second leg.

The teams were seeded by their performances in the CAF competitions for the previous five seasons (CAF 5-year ranking points shown in parentheses):

- Pot A contained the eight seeded losers of the Champions League first round.
- Pot B contained the six seeded winners of the Confederation Cup first round.
- Pot C contained the eight unseeded losers of the Champions League first round.
- Pot D contained the ten unseeded winners of the Confederation Cup first round.

First, a team from Pot A and a team from Pot D were drawn into eight ties. Next, a team from Pot B and a team from Pot C were drawn into six ties. Finally, the remaining teams from Pot C and Pot D were drawn into the last two ties.

Pot	Pot A	Pot B	Pot C	Pot D
Qualified from	Champions League	Confederation Cup	Champions League	Confederation Cup
Teams	(Senegal) Génération Foot (Note: Since the identity of the losers of the Champions League first round tie between Zamalek and Génération Foot was not known at the time of the draw, the ranking of the higher-ranked team Zamalek (44 pts) was used for seeding of the draw.); (Guinea) Horoya (30 pts); (Nigeria) Enyimba (16 pts); (Kenya) Gor Mahia (14 pts); (Uganda) KCCA (11 pts); (Ghana) Asante Kotoko (5 pts); (Mozambique) UD Songo (4 pts); (Tanzania) Young Africans (3 pts)	(Morocco) RS Berkane (28 pts); (Egypt) Al-Masry (12 pts); (Morocco) Hassania Agadir (10 pts); (Zambia) Zanaco (6 pts); (Nigeria) Enugu Rangers (5 pts); (Mali) Djoliba (2 pts)	(Chad) Elect-Sport; (Equatorial Guinea) Cano Sport; (Libya) Al-Nasr; (Madagascar) Fosa Juniors; (Mauritania) FC Nouadhibou; (Seychelles) Côte d'Or; (Togo) ASC Kara; (Zambia) Green Eagles	(Algeria) Paradou AC; (Benin) ESAE; (Democratic Republic of the Congo) DC Motema Pembe; (Ivory Coast) FC San Pédro; (Egypt) Pyramids; (Kenya) Bandari; (South Africa) Bidvest Wits; (South Africa) TS Galaxy; (Uganda) Proline; (Zimbabwe) Triangle United

The 16 winners of the play-off round advanced to the group stage.

Team 1	Agg.	Team 2	1st leg	2nd leg
Horoya (Guinea)	5–2	(Kenya) Bandari	4–2	1–0
Young Africans (Tanzania)	1–5	(Egypt) Pyramids	1–2	0–3
Enyimba (Nigeria)	4–1	(South Africa) TS Galaxy	2–0	2–1
Génération Foot (Senegal)	1–1 (3–4 p)	(Benin) ESAE	0–1	1–0
Asante Kotoko (Ghana)	1–2	(Ivory Coast) FC San Pédro	1–0	0–2
KCCA (Uganda)	1–4	(Algeria) Paradou AC	0–0	1–4
Gor Mahia (Kenya)	2–3	(Democratic Republic of the Congo) DC Motema Pembe	1–1	1–2
UD Songo (Mozambique)	1–8	(South Africa) Bidvest Wits	1–2	0–6
Elect-Sport (Chad)	0–5	(Mali) Djoliba	0–1	0–4
Green Eagles (Zambia)	2–3	(Morocco) Hassania Agadir	1–1	1–2
Cano Sport (Equatorial Guinea)	2–8	(Zambia) Zanaco	1–3	1–5
Fosa Juniors (Madagascar)	2–5	(Morocco) RS Berkane	2–0	0–5
Côte d'Or (Seychelles)	0–6	(Egypt) Al-Masry	0–4	0–2
ASC Kara (Togo)	2–2 (a)	(Nigeria) Enugu Rangers	2–1	0–1
FC Nouadhibou (Mauritania)	4–3	(Zimbabwe) Triangle United	2–0	2–3
Al-Nasr (Libya)	4–2	(Uganda) Proline	2–2	2–0

27 October 2019
16:00 UTC+0

Horoya (Guinea)	4–2	(Kenya) Bandari
Bancé 1', 55', 67'; Nikièma 18'		Abdallah 25'; Wadri 45+2'

Stade du 28 Septembre, Conakry
Referee: Bakary Gassama (Gambia)
3 November 2019
15:00 UTC+3

Bandari (Kenya)	0–1	(Guinea) Horoya
		Mandela 66'

Moi International Sports Centre, Kasarani
Referee: Norman Matemera (Zimbabwe)

Horoya won 5–2 on aggregate.

27 October 2019
16:00 UTC+3

Young Africans (Tanzania)	1–2	(Egypt) Pyramids
Kabamba 88'		Traoré 42'; El Said 63'

CCM Kirumba Stadium, Mwanza
Referee: Kalilou Traoré (Ivory Coast)
3 November 2019
20:00 UTC+2

Pyramids (Egypt)	3–0	(Tanzania) Young Africans
Traoré 28'; Farouk 80'; El Said 90+5'

30 June Stadium, Cairo
Referee: Blaise Yuven Ngwa (Cameroon)

Pyramids won 5–1 on aggregate.

27 October 2019
16:00 UTC+1

Enyimba (Nigeria)	2–0	(South Africa) TS Galaxy
Mbaoma 7'; Usule 60'

Enyimba International Stadium, Aba
3 November 2019
15:00 UTC+2

TS Galaxy (South Africa)	1–2	(Nigeria) Enyimba
Mashego 89'		Darkwah 76'; Usule 82'

Mbombela Stadium, Mbombela

Enyimba won 4–1 on aggregate.

30 October 2019 (Note: The matches between Génération Foot and ESAE were played on 30 October and 5 November 2019 due to the delay of the Champions League first round tie between Zamalek and Génération Foot.)
18:00 UTC+0

Génération Foot (Senegal)	0–1	(Benin) ESAE
		Kokpon 74'

Stade Lat-Dior, Thiès
Referee: Babacar Sarr (Mauritania)
5 November 2019
16:00 UTC+1

ESAE (Benin)	0–1	(Senegal) Génération Foot
		Bayo 42'
Penalties
Penalty missed Penalty scored	4–3	Penalty scored Penalty missed

Stade René Pleven, Cotonou
Referee: Mohamed Ali Moussa (Niger)

1–1 on aggregate. ESAE won 4–3 on penalties.

27 October 2019 (Note: The Asante Kotoko v FC San Pédro match was suspended during half time due to heavy rains, and was continued on 28 October 2019, 14:00 UTC±0.)
15:00 UTC+0

Asante Kotoko (Ghana)	1–0	(Ivory Coast) FC San Pédro
Keïta 90+4' (pen.)

Baba Yara Stadium, Kumasi
Referee: Eugene Mdluli (South Africa)
3 November 2019
16:00 UTC+0

FC San Pédro (Ivory Coast)	2–0	(Ghana) Asante Kotoko
Soumaoro 3'; Diomandé 85'

Stade Félix Houphouët-Boigny, Abidjan
Referee: Joseph Odey Ogabor (Nigeria)

FC San Pédro won 2–1 on aggregate.

27 October 2019
16:00 UTC+3

KCCA (Uganda)	0–0	(Algeria) Paradou AC

Startimes Stadium, Kampala
Referee: Thulani Sibandze (Eswatini)
3 November 2019
20:45 UTC+1

Paradou AC (Algeria)	4–1	(Uganda) KCCA
Herrari 9'; Bouzok 38' (pen.); Kadri 65'; Bouguerra 70'		Okello 23'

Stade du 5 Juillet, Algiers
Referee: Louis Houngnandande (Benin)

Paradou AC won 4–1 on aggregate.

27 October 2019
16:00 UTC+3

Gor Mahia (Kenya)	1–1	(Democratic Republic of the Congo) DC Motema Pembe
Gnamien 63'		Luezi 70'

Moi International Sports Centre, Kasarani
Referee: Lotfi Bekouassa (Algeria)
3 November 2019
15:30 UTC+1

DC Motema Pembe (Democratic Republic of the Congo)	2–1	(Kenya) Gor Mahia
Bongonga 45+2'; Koné 66'		Ochieng 10'

Stade des Martyrs, Kinshasa
Referee: Celso Alvação (Mozambique)

DC Motema Pembe won 3–2 on aggregate.

27 October 2019
15:00 UTC+2

UD Songo (Mozambique)	1–2	(South Africa) Bidvest Wits
Telinho 34'		Hotto 23'; Doutie 60'

Estádio do Zimpeto, Maputo
3 November 2019
18:00 UTC+2

Bidvest Wits (South Africa)	6–0	(Mozambique) UD Songo
Motupa 20', 44', 54', 75'; Macuphu 84'; Mahangwahaya 88'

Bidvest Stadium, Johannesburg

Bidvest Wits won 8–1 on aggregate.

27 October 2019
15:30 UTC+1

Elect-Sport (Chad)	0–1	(Mali) Djoliba
		Camara 85'

Stade Omnisports Idriss Mahamat Ouya, N'Djamena
Referee: Souleiman Ahmed Djama (Djibouti)
3 November 2019
16:00 UTC+0

Djoliba (Mali)	4–0	(Chad) Elect-Sport
Camara 31'; Coulibaly 49'; Bah 60' (pen.); Ekwa 90+2'

Stade Modibo Kéïta, Bamako
Referee: Mutaz Ibrahim (Libya)

Djoliba won 5–0 on aggregate.

27 October 2019
15:00 UTC+2

Green Eagles (Zambia)	1–1	(Morocco) Hassania Agadir
Sautu 31'		Rami 90+1'

Nkoloma Stadium, Lusaka
Referee: Abdoul Ohabee Kanoso (Madagascar)
3 November 2019
19:00 UTC+1

Hassania Agadir (Morocco)	2–1	(Zambia) Green Eagles
El Mallouki 71'; El Berkaoui 87'		Kaseba 56'

Stade Adrar, Agadir
Referee: Alhadi Allaou Mahamat (Chad)

Hassania Agadir won 3–2 on aggregate.

27 October 2019
17:00 UTC+1

Cano Sport (Equatorial Guinea)	1–3	(Zambia) Zanaco
Sipi 79'		Tembo 37'; Manziba 46', 80'

Estadio de Malabo, Malabo
Referee: Mashood Ssali (Uganda)
3 November 2019
15:00 UTC+2

Zanaco (Zambia)	5–1	(Equatorial Guinea) Cano Sport
Kola 2', 12'; Tembo 49', 77'; Mbewe 58'		Diarra 69'

National Heroes Stadium, Lusaka
Referee: Messie Nkounkou (Congo)

Zanaco won 8–2 on aggregate.

27 October 2019
14:30 UTC+3

Fosa Juniors (Madagascar)	2–0	(Morocco) RS Berkane
Razafindrakoto 10'; Rakotoarisoa 90+2' (pen.)

CNaPS Stadium, Antananarivo
Referee: Ndala Ngambo (DR Congo)
3 November 2019
19:00 UTC+1

RS Berkane (Morocco)	5–0	(Madagascar) Fosa Juniors
Traoré 7', 26'; Aziz 36' (pen.), 44'; Laachir 69'

Stade Municipal de Berkane, Berkane
Referee: Dahane Beida (Mauritania)

RS Berkane won 5–2 on aggregate.

27 October 2019
16:00 UTC+4

Côte d'Or (Seychelles)	0–4	(Egypt) Al-Masry
		Yasser 6'; Wadi 13'; Amutu 90'; Gomaa 90+2'

Stade Linité, Victoria
Referee: Patrice Milazar (Mauritius)
3 November 2019
15:00 UTC+2

Al-Masry (Egypt)	2–0	(Seychelles) Côte d'Or
Gomaa 21', 78'

Borg El Arab Stadium, Alexandria
Referee: Boureima Sanogo (Burkina Faso)

Al-Masry won 6–0 on aggregate.

27 October 2019
16:00 UTC+0

ASC Kara (Togo)	2–1	(Nigeria) Enugu Rangers
Mani 29'; Nane 90+2'		George 32' (pen.)

Stade de Kégué, Lomé
Referee: Daouda Gueye (Senegal)
3 November 2019
16:00 UTC+1

Enugu Rangers (Nigeria)	1–0	(Togo) ASC Kara
Chinonso 18'

Nnamdi Azikiwe Stadium, Enugu
Referee: Ahmed El Ghandour (Egypt)

2–2 on aggregate. Enugu Rangers won on away goals.

27 October 2019
17:00 UTC+0

FC Nouadhibou (Mauritania)	2–0	(Zimbabwe) Triangle United
Cissé 52'; Gueye 57'

Stade Cheikha Ould Boïdiya, Nouakchott
Referee: Haythem Guirat (Tunisia)
3 November 2019
15:00 UTC+2

Triangle United (Zimbabwe)	3–2	(Mauritania) FC Nouadhibou
Makoni 47'; Kawondera 52'; Chivandire 81'		El-Wely 7', 54'

Barbourfields Stadium, Bulawayo
Referee: Ring Malong (South Sudan)

FC Nouadhibou won 4–3 on aggregate.

27 October 2019
19:00 UTC+2

Al-Nasr (Libya)	2–2	(Uganda) Proline
Al-Mehdi 13'; Almaryami 68' (pen.)		Mujuzi 45+1'; Anukani 78'

Borg El Arab Stadium, Alexandria (Egypt)
Referee: Dawdu Williams (Sierra Leone)
3 November 2019
16:00 UTC+3

Proline (Uganda)	0–2	(Libya) Al-Nasr
		Almaryami 5'; Albedwi 62'

Startimes Stadium, Kampala
Referee: Elsiddig El Treefe (Sudan)

Al-Nasr won 4–2 on aggregate.
