= 2019–20 CAF Champions League qualifying rounds =

- Dates: 9 August – 24 October 2019

Tournament statistics
- Matches played: 90
- Goals scored: 237 (2.63 per match)

The 2019–20 CAF Champions League qualifying rounds were played from 9 August to 24 October 2019. A total of 61 teams competed in the qualifying rounds to decide the 16 places in the group stage of the 2019–20 CAF Champions League.

== Draw ==
The draw for the qualifying rounds was held on 21 July 2019 at the CAF headquarters in Cairo, Egypt.

The entry round of the 61 teams entered into the draw was determined by their performances in the CAF competitions for the previous five seasons (CAF 5-year ranking points shown in parentheses).

Entry round	First round (3 teams)	Preliminary round (58 teams)
Teams	(Tunisia) Espérance de Tunis (63.5 pts); (Morocco) Wydad AC (63 pts); (Democratic Republic of the Congo) TP Mazembe (63 pts)	(Egypt) Al-Ahly (Note: The teams from Egypt were listed as Egypt 1 (Al-Ahly) and Egypt 2 (Zamalek) at the time of the qualifying round draw as the identity of the teams had not been confirmed.) (57 pts); (Tunisia) Étoile du Sahel (50 pts); (South Africa) Mamelodi Sundowns (49 pts); (Egypt) Zamalek (44 pts); (Guinea) Horoya (30 pts); (Morocco) Raja Casablanca (25 pts); (Algeria) USM Alger (25 pts); (Zambia) ZESCO United (24.5 pts); (Democratic Republic of the Congo) AS Vita Club (24 pts); (Sudan) Al-Hilal (19 pts); (Nigeria) Enyimba (16 pts); (Angola) 1º de Agosto (16 pts); (Tanzania) Simba (15 pts); (South Africa) Orlando Pirates (14 pts); (Kenya) Gor Mahia (14 pts); (Uganda) KCCA (11 pts); (Sudan) Al-Merrikh (10 pts); (Rwanda) Rayon Sports (8 pts); (Ghana) Asante Kotoko (5 pts); (Zimbabwe) FC Platinum (5 pts); (Mozambique) UD Songo (4 pts); (Botswana) Township Rollers (4 pts); (Tanzania) Young Africans (3 pts); (Angola) Petro de Luanda (2.5 pts); (Republic of the Congo) AS Otôho (2.5 pts); (Mali) Stade Malien (1 pt); (Algeria) JS Kabylie; (Zambia) Green Eagles; (Nigeria) Kano Pillars; (Guinea) Hafia; (Ivory Coast) SO de l'Armée; (Libya) Al-Nasr; (Eswatini) Green Mamba; (Ethiopia) Mekelle 70 Enderta; (Togo) ASC Kara; (Cameroon) UMS de Loum; (Burkina Faso) Rahimo; (Gabon) Cercle Mbéri Sportif; (Benin) Buffles du Borgou; (Burundi) Aigle Noir; (Central African Republic) AS Tempête Mocaf; (Chad) Elect-Sport; (Comoros) Fomboni; (Equatorial Guinea) Cano Sport; (The Gambia) Brikama United; (Lesotho) Matlama; (Liberia) LPRC Oilers; (Madagascar) Fosa Juniors; (Malawi) Big Bullets; (Mauritania) FC Nouadhibou; (Mauritius) Pamplemousses; (Namibia) African Stars; (Niger) AS SONIDEP; (Senegal) Génération Foot; (Seychelles) Côte d'Or; (Somalia) Dekedaha; (South Sudan) Atlabara; (Zanzibar) KMKM

== Format ==
In the qualifying rounds, each tie was played on a home-and-away two-legged basis. If the aggregate score was tied after the second leg, the away goals rule was applied, and if still tied, extra time was not played, and the penalty shoot-out was used to determine the winner (Regulations III. 13 & 14).

== Schedule ==
The schedule of the competition was as follows.

Round	First leg	Second leg
Preliminary round	9–11 August 2019	23–25 August 2019
First round	13–15 September 2019	27–29 September 2019

== Bracket ==
The bracket of the draw was announced by the CAF on 21 July 2019. The 16 winners of the first round advanced to the group stage, while the 16 losers of the first round entered the Confederation Cup play-off round.

Preliminary round
1	(Central African Republic) AS Tempête Mocaf	1	1	2
4	(Libya) Al-Nasr	0	3	3
3	(The Gambia) Brikama United	3	0	3
2	(Morocco) Raja Casablanca	3	4	7

First round
(Libya) Al-Nasr	1	1	2
(Morocco) Raja Casablanca	3	1	4

Preliminary round
1	(Algeria) JS Kabylie (a)	1	2	3
4	(Sudan) Al-Merrikh	0	3	3
3	(Mali) Stade Malien	1	0	0
2	(Guinea) Horoya	1	1	2

First round
(Algeria) JS Kabylie (p)	2	0	2 (5)
(Guinea) Horoya	0	2	2 (3)

Preliminary round
1	(Benin) Buffles du Borgou	1	0	1
4	(Togo) ASC Kara	1	1	2
3	(Cameroon) UMS de Loum	0	0	0
2	(Democratic Republic of the Congo) AS Vita Club	0	1	1

First round
(Togo) ASC Kara	0	0	0
(Democratic Republic of the Congo) AS Vita Club	0	1	1

Preliminary round
1	(Burkina Faso) Rahimo	1	0	1
4	(Nigeria) Enyimba	0	5	5
3	(Rwanda) Rayon Sports	1	0	1
2	(Sudan) Al-Hilal (a)	1	0	1

First round
(Nigeria) Enyimba	0	0	0
(Sudan) Al-Hilal	0	1	1

Preliminary round
1	(Niger) AS SONIDEP	1	1	2
4	(Algeria) USM Alger	2	3	5
3	(Burundi) Aigle Noir	0	1	1
2	(Kenya) Gor Mahia	0	5	5

First round
(Algeria) USM Alger	4	2	6
(Kenya) Gor Mahia	1	0	1

Preliminary round
1	(Equatorial Guinea) Cano Sport	2	1	3
4	(Ethiopia) Mekelle 70 Enderta	1	1	2
3	(South Sudan) Atlabara	0	0	0
2	(Egypt) Al-Ahly	4	9	13

First round
(Equatorial Guinea) Cano Sport	0	0	0
(Egypt) Al-Ahly	2	4	6

Preliminary round
1	(Liberia) LPRC Oilers	1	0	1
4	(Senegal) Génération Foot	0	3	3
3	(Somalia) Dekedaha	0	0	0
2	(Egypt) Zamalek	7	6	13

First round
(Senegal) Génération Foot	2	0	2
(Egypt) Zamalek (a)	1	1	2

Preliminary round
1	(Nigeria) Kano Pillars	3	0	3
4	(Ghana) Asante Kotoko	2	2	4
3	(Guinea) Hafia	2	1	3
2	(Tunisia) Étoile du Sahel	1	7	8

First round
(Ghana) Asante Kotoko	2	0	2
(Tunisia) Étoile du Sahel	0	3	3

Preliminary round
1	(Lesotho) Matlama	0	0	0
4	(Angola) Petro de Luanda	2	2	4
3	(Namibia) African Stars	3	0	3
2	(Uganda) KCCA	2	2	4

First round
(Angola) Petro de Luanda (a)	0	1	1
(Uganda) KCCA	0	1	1

Preliminary round
1	(Comoros) Fomboni	2	1	3
4	(Seychelles) Côte d'Or (a)	2	1	3
3	(Republic of the Congo) AS Otôho	2	0	2
2	(South Africa) Mamelodi Sundowns	1	4	5

First round
(Seychelles) Côte d'Or	0	1	1
(South Africa) Mamelodi Sundowns	5	11	16

Preliminary round
1	(Ivory Coast) SO de l'Armée	0	0	0
4	(Mauritania) FC Nouadhibou	0	1	1
3	(Morocco) Wydad AC	Bye
2

First round
(Mauritania) FC Nouadhibou	0	1	1
(Morocco) Wydad AC	2	4	6

Preliminary round
1	(Gabon) Cercle Mbéri Sportif	0	0	0
4	(Chad) Elect-Sport	0	2	2
3	(Tunisia) Espérance de Tunis	Bye
2

First round
(Chad) Elect-Sport	1	1	2
(Tunisia) Espérance de Tunis	1	2	3

Preliminary round
1	(Tanzania) Young Africans	1	1	2
4	(Botswana) Township Rollers	1	0	1
3	(Eswatini) Green Mamba	0	0	0
2	(Zambia) ZESCO United	2	1	3

First round
(Tanzania) Young Africans	1	1	2
(Zambia) ZESCO United	1	2	3

Preliminary round
1	(Malawi) Big Bullets	0	2	2
4	(Zimbabwe) FC Platinum	0	3	3
3	(Mozambique) UD Songo (a)	0	1	1
2	(Tanzania) Simba	0	1	1

First round
(Zimbabwe) FC Platinum	1	4	5
(Mozambique) UD Songo	0	2	2

Preliminary round
1	(Zambia) Green Eagles	1	1	2
4	(South Africa) Orlando Pirates	0	1	1
3	(Zanzibar) KMKM	0	0	0
2	(Angola) 1º de Agosto	2	2	4

First round
(Zambia) Green Eagles	1	1	2
(Angola) 1º de Agosto (a)	2	0	2

Preliminary round
1	(Madagascar) Fosa Juniors	1	1	2
4	(Mauritius) Pamplemousses	0	1	1
3	(Democratic Republic of the Congo) TP Mazembe	Bye
2

First round
(Madagascar) Fosa Juniors	0	1	1
(Democratic Republic of the Congo) TP Mazembe	0	3	3

== Preliminary round ==
The preliminary round included the 58 teams that did not receive byes to the first round.

Team 1	Agg.	Team 2	1st leg	2nd leg
Brikama United (The Gambia)	3–7	(Morocco) Raja Casablanca	3–3	0–4
AS Tempête Mocaf (Central African Republic)	2–3	(Libya) Al-Nasr	1–0	1–3
JS Kabylie (Algeria)	3–3 (a)	(Sudan) Al-Merrikh	1–0	2–3
Stade Malien (Mali)	1–2	(Guinea) Horoya	1–1	0–1
Buffles du Borgou (Benin)	1–2	(Togo) ASC Kara	1–1	0–1
UMS de Loum (Cameroon)	0–1	(Democratic Republic of the Congo) AS Vita Club	0–0	0–1
Rayon Sports (Rwanda)	1–1 (a)	(Sudan) Al-Hilal	1–1	0–0
Rahimo (Burkina Faso)	1–5	(Nigeria) Enyimba	1–0	0–5
AS SONIDEP (Niger)	2–5	(Algeria) USM Alger	1–2	1–3
Aigle Noir (Burundi)	1–5	(Kenya) Gor Mahia	0–0	1–5
Atlabara (South Sudan)	0–13	(Egypt) Al-Ahly	0–4	0–9
Cano Sport (Equatorial Guinea)	3–2	(Ethiopia) Mekelle 70 Enderta	2–1	1–1
Dekedaha (Somalia)	0–13	(Egypt) Zamalek	0–7	0–6
LPRC Oilers (Liberia)	1–3	(Senegal) Génération Foot	1–0	0–3
Hafia (Guinea)	3–8	(Tunisia) Étoile du Sahel	2–1	1–7
Kano Pillars (Nigeria)	3–4	(Ghana) Asante Kotoko	3–2	0–2
African Stars (Namibia)	3–4	(Uganda) KCCA	3–2	0–2
Matlama (Lesotho)	0–4	(Angola) Petro de Luanda	0–2	0–2
Fomboni (Comoros)	3–3 (a)	(Seychelles) Côte d'Or	2–2	1–1
AS Otôho (Republic of the Congo)	2–5	(South Africa) Mamelodi Sundowns	2–1	0–4
SO de l'Armée (Ivory Coast)	0–1	(Mauritania) FC Nouadhibou	0–0	0–1
Cercle Mbéri Sportif (Gabon)	0–2	(Chad) Elect-Sport	0–0	0–2
Green Mamba (Eswatini)	0–3	(Zambia) ZESCO United	0–2	0–1
Young Africans (Tanzania)	2–1	(Botswana) Township Rollers	1–1	1–0
Big Bullets (Malawi)	2–3	(Zimbabwe) FC Platinum	0–0	2–3
UD Songo (Mozambique)	1–1 (a)	(Tanzania) Simba	0–0	1–1
KMKM (Zanzibar)	0–4	(Angola) 1º de Agosto	0–2	0–2
Green Eagles (Zambia)	2–1	(South Africa) Orlando Pirates	1–0	1–1
Fosa Juniors (Madagascar)	2–1	(Mauritius) Pamplemousses	1–0	1–1

10 August 2019
16:00 UTC+0

Brikama United (The Gambia)	3–3	(Morocco) Raja Casablanca
Bojang 24', 37'; Manneh 45'	Report	Banoun 5', 59'; Moutouali 28'

Independence Stadium, Bakau
Referee: Elhadji Amadou Sy (Senegal)
24 August 2019
20:00 UTC+1

Raja Casablanca (Morocco)	4–0	(The Gambia) Brikama United
Rahimi 17'; Nanah 49', 76'; Moutouali 52'	Report

Stade Mohammed V, Casablanca
Referee: Charles Benle Bulu (Ghana)

Raja Casablanca won 7–3 on aggregate.

11 August 2019
15:00 UTC+1

AS Tempête Mocaf (Central African Republic)	1–0	(Libya) Al-Nasr
Nyetobouko 82'	Report

Barthélemy Boganda Stadium, Bangui
Referee: Alfred Armi (Chad)
25 August 2019
18:00 UTC+2

Al-Nasr (Libya)	3–1	(Central African Republic) AS Tempête Mocaf
Al-Mehdi 13', 54'; Belaem 60'	Report	Kaya 79'

Petro Sport Stadium, Cairo (Egypt) (Note: Teams from Libya played their home matches outside the country due to security concerns from the ongoing civil war.)
Referee: Bangaly Konate (Guinea)

Al-Nasr won 3–2 on aggregate.

9 August 2019
20:45 UTC+1

JS Kabylie (Algeria)	1–0	(Sudan) Al-Merrikh
Bensayah 43'	Report

November 1, 1954 Stadium, Tizi Ouzou
Referee: Mohamed Maarouf (Egypt)
24 August 2019
18:30 UTC+2

Al-Merrikh (Sudan)	3–2	(Algeria) JS Kabylie
Al-Madina 44' (pen.), 74'; Tajeldin 56'	Report	Saâdou 79'; Addadi 84' (pen.)

Al-Merrikh Stadium, Omdurman
Referee: Belay Tadesse (Ethiopia)

3–3 on aggregate. JS Kabylie won on away goals.

10 August 2019
16:00 UTC+0

Stade Malien (Mali)	1–1	(Guinea) Horoya
Koné 89'	Report	Asante 49'

Stade Modibo Kéïta, Bamako
Referee: Mathioro Diabel (Mauritania)
25 August 2019
16:00 UTC+0

Horoya (Guinea)	1–0	(Mali) Stade Malien
Nikièma 24'	Report

Stade du 28 Septembre, Conakry
Referee: Gilberto António Dos Santos (Guinea-Bissau)

Horoya won 2–1 on aggregate.

11 August 2019
16:30 UTC+1

Buffles du Borgou (Benin)	1–1	(Togo) ASC Kara
Martins 41' (pen.)	Report	Ouro-Agoro 87'

Stade René Pleven d'Akpakpa, Cotonou
Referee: Nabil Boukhalfa (Algeria)
25 August 2019
16:00 UTC+0

ASC Kara (Togo)	1–0	(Benin) Buffles du Borgou
Nane 81'	Report

Stade de Kégué, Lomé
Referee: Mohamed Ali Moussa (Niger)

ASC Kara won 2–1 on aggregate.

11 August 2019
15:30 UTC+1

UMS de Loum (Cameroon)	0–0	(Democratic Republic of the Congo) AS Vita Club
	Report

Stade Militaire, Yaoundé
Referee: Gauthier Mihindo Mbina (Gabon)
25 August 2019
15:30 UTC+1

AS Vita Club (Democratic Republic of the Congo)	1–0	(Cameroon) UMS de Loum
Mumuni 64'	Report

Stade des Martyrs, Kinshasa
Referee: Messie Nkounkou Mvoutou (Congo)

AS Vita Club won 1–0 on aggregate.

11 August 2019
15:00 UTC+2

Rayon Sports (Rwanda)	1–1	(Sudan) Al-Hilal
Sarpong 20'	Report	Nazar 26'

Amahoro Stadium, Kigali
Referee: Anthony Ogwayo (Kenya)
25 August 2019
19:35 UTC+2

Al-Hilal (Sudan)	0–0	(Rwanda) Rayon Sports
	Report

Al-Hilal Stadium, Omdurman
Referee: Hassan Mohamed Hagi (Somalia)

1–1 on aggregate. Al-Hilal won on away goals.

10 August 2019
16:00 UTC+0

Rahimo (Burkina Faso)	1–0	(Nigeria) Enyimba
Zonon 30'	Report

Stade Wobi, Bobo-Dioulasso
Referee: Kokou Ognankotan N’Talé (Togo)
23 August 2019
16:00 UTC+1

Enyimba (Nigeria)	5–0	(Burkina Faso) Rahimo
Bala 32', 86'; Okorom 47'; Dimgba 80', 89'	Report

Enyimba International Stadium, Aba
Referee: Bienvenu Sinko (Ivory Coast)

Enyimba won 5–1 on aggregate.

9 August 2019
16:30 UTC+1

AS SONIDEP (Niger)	1–2	(Algeria) USM Alger
Sabo 14' (pen.)	Report	Benchaâ 51', 69'

Stade Général Seyni Kountché, Niamey
Referee: Salisu Basheer (Nigeria)
25 August 2019
20:45 UTC+1

USM Alger (Algeria)	3–1	(Niger) AS SONIDEP
Mahious 27'; Ellafi 35'; Ardji 64'	Report	Kheiraoui 59' (o.g.)

July 5, 1962 Stadium, Algiers
Referee: Issa Sy (Senegal)

USM Alger won 5–2 on aggregate.

11 August 2019
15:00 UTC+2

Aigle Noir (Burundi)	0–0	(Kenya) Gor Mahia
	Report

Prince Louis Rwagasore Stadium, Bujumbura
Referee: Elly Ally Sasii (Tanzania)
23 August 2019
16:00 UTC+3

Gor Mahia (Kenya)	5–1	(Burundi) Aigle Noir
Hitimana 8' (o.g.); Kipkirui 16', 36'; Ambundo 63'; Omondi 68'	Report	Gasongo 73'

Moi International Sports Centre, Nairobi
Referee: Louis Hakizimana (Rwanda)

Gor Mahia won 5–1 on aggregate.

11 August 2019
19:00 UTC+2

Atlabara (South Sudan)	0–4	(Egypt) Al-Ahly
	Report	Maâloul 16' (pen.); Azaro 33', 48'; El Sheikh 90+2'

Borg El Arab Stadium, Alexandria (Egypt) (Note: Teams from South Sudan played their home matches outside the country due to renovation of Juba Stadium.)
Attendance: 10,000
Referee: Brian Miiro Nsubuga (Uganda)
23 August 2019
19:00 UTC+2

Al-Ahly (Egypt)	9–0	(South Sudan) Atlabara
S. Mohsen 6', 40'; El Shahat 19', 46', 62'; A. Fathy 45'; H. Fathy 55', 67'; Salim 81' (o.g.)	Report

Borg El Arab Stadium, Alexandria
Attendance: 7,000
Referee: Lahlou Benbraham (Algeria)

Al-Ahly won 13–0 on aggregate.

10 August 2019
17:00 UTC+1

Cano Sport (Equatorial Guinea)	2–1	(Ethiopia) Mekelle 70 Enderta
Obiang 30'; Sipi 63'	Report	Gebremichael 80'

Estadio de Malabo, Malabo
Referee: Douglas Kouete (Cameroon)
25 August 2019
15:00 UTC+3

Mekelle 70 Enderta (Ethiopia)	1–1	(Equatorial Guinea) Cano Sport
Gebremichael 13'	Report	Ndong 39'

Tigray Stadium, Mekelle
Referee: Saddam Houssein Mansour (Djibouti)

Cano Sport won 3–2 on aggregate.

16 August 2019 (Note: The Dekedaha v Zamalek match was postponed from 11 August to 16 August due to Eid al-Adha celebrations.)
21:00 UTC+2

Dekedaha (Somalia)	0–7	(Egypt) Zamalek
	Report	Bencharki 5' (pen.), 55'; Hamdy 29', 49'; El Said 45+1'; Bambo 77'; Mostafa 80'

Borg El Arab Stadium, Alexandria (Egypt) (Note: Teams from Somalia played their home matches outside the country due to security concerns from the ongoing civil war.)
Referee: Tewodros Mitiku (Ethiopia)
24 August 2019
21:00 UTC+2

Zamalek (Egypt)	6–0	(Somalia) Dekedaha
Mostafa 25', 52'; Shikabala 66', 72'; Alaa 78' (pen.); Abdel Aziz 85'	Report

Borg El Arab Stadium, Alexandria
Referee: Mohamed Yousri Bouali (Tunisia)

Zamalek won 13–0 on aggregate.

11 August 2019
15:30 UTC+0

LPRC Oilers (Liberia)	1–0	(Senegal) Génération Foot
Sackor 54'	Report

Antoinette Tubman Stadium, Monrovia
Referee: Kouassi Attisso Attiogbe (Togo)
24 August 2019
18:00 UTC+0

Génération Foot (Senegal)	3–0	(Liberia) LPRC Oilers
Gueye 16'; Bayo 57'; Diagne 83'	Report

Stade Lat-Dior, Thiès
Referee: Lenine Delgado Rocha (Cape Verde)

Génération Foot won 3–1 on aggregate.

11 August 2019
16:00 UTC+0

Hafia (Guinea)	2–1	(Tunisia) Étoile du Sahel
Sylla 10'; Sacca 90+4'	Report	Aribi 2'

Stade du 28 Septembre, Conakry
Referee: Omar Sallah (Gambia)
24 August 2019
19:00 UTC+1

Étoile du Sahel (Tunisia)	7–1	(Guinea) Hafia
Ben Ouanes 38' (pen.); Aribi 47', 53', 56', 86'; Ben Larbi 52' (pen.), 62'	Report	Bidimbou 53'

Stade Mustapha Ben Jannet, Monastir
Referee: Ahmed El Ghandour (Egypt)

Étoile du Sahel won 8–3 on aggregate.

10 August 2019
16:00 UTC+1

Kano Pillars (Nigeria)	3–2	(Ghana) Asante Kotoko
Adam 12'; Ali 70'; Gambo 75'	Report	Blay 52'; Asiamah 62'

Sani Abacha Stadium, Kano
Referee: Juste Zio (Burkina Faso)
25 August 2019
15:00 UTC+0

Asante Kotoko (Ghana)	2–0	(Nigeria) Kano Pillars
Andoh 12'; Gyamfi 81'	Report

Baba Yara Stadium, Kumasi
Referee: Louis Houngnandande (Benin)

Asante Kotoko won 4–3 on aggregate.

10 August 2019
15:00 UTC+2

African Stars (Namibia)	3–2	(Uganda) KCCA
Amseb 40' (pen.); Youssouf 71', 85'	Report	Kamberipa 13' (o.g.); Kaddu 83'

Sam Nujoma Stadium, Windhoek
Referee: Emile Fred (Seychelles)
23 August 2019
16:00 UTC+3

KCCA (Uganda)	2–0	(Namibia) African Stars
Kizza 81'; Okello 88'	Report

Startimes Stadium, Kampala
Referee: Mahmood Ali Ismail (Sudan)

KCCA won 4–3 on aggregate.

11 August 2019
15:00 UTC+2

Matlama (Lesotho)	0–2	(Angola) Petro de Luanda
	Report	Manguxi 37'; Mensah 42'

Setsoto Stadium, Maseru
Referee: Norman Matemera (Zimbabwe)
25 August 2019
16:00 UTC+1

Petro de Luanda (Angola)	2–0	(Lesotho) Matlama
Mensah 37'; Afonso 82'	Report

Estádio 11 de Novembro, Luanda
Referee: Tshepo Mokani Gobagoba (Botswana)

Petro de Luanda won 4–0 on aggregate.

11 August 2019
15:00 UTC+3

Fomboni (Comoros)	2–2	(Seychelles) Côte d'Or
Sadad 63'; Mouhtare 76'	Report	Esther 34'; Kbenga 56'

Stade de Moroni, Moroni
Referee: William Oloya (Uganda)
23 August 2019
16:00 UTC+4

Côte d'Or (Seychelles)	1–1	(Comoros) Fomboni
Kizito 90'	Report	Mouhtare 87'

Stade Linité, Victoria
Referee: Lebalang Martin Mokete (Lesotho)

3–3 on aggregate. Côte d'Or won on away goals.

11 August 2019
15:30 UTC+1

AS Otôho (Republic of the Congo)	2–1	(South Africa) Mamelodi Sundowns
Nganou 10' (pen.); Tofic 26'	Report	Morena 86'

Stade Omnisport Marien Ngouabi, Owando
Referee: Franck Bito (Cameroon)
24 August 2019
19:00 UTC+2

Mamelodi Sundowns (South Africa)	4–0	(Republic of the Congo) AS Otôho
Sirino 14', 34'; Lebusa 25'; T. Zwane 40'	Report

Lucas Masterpieces Moripe Stadium, Pretoria

Mamelodi Sundowns won 5–2 on aggregate.

11 August 2019
15:30 UTC+0

SO de l'Armée (Ivory Coast)	0–0	(Mauritania) FC Nouadhibou
	Report

Stade Félix Houphouët-Boigny, Abidjan
Referee: Boubou Traoré (Mali)
25 August 2019
17:00 UTC+0

FC Nouadhibou (Mauritania)	1–0	(Ivory Coast) SO de l'Armée
Gaye 70' (pen.)	Report

Stade Cheikha Ould Boïdiya, Nouakchott
Referee: Slim Belkhaouas (Tunisia)

FC Nouadhibou won 1–0 on aggregate.

11 August 2019
15:30 UTC+1

Cercle Mbéri Sportif (Gabon)	0–0	(Chad) Elect-Sport
	Report

Stade Augustin Monédan de Sibang, Libreville
Referee: Prince Arcy Dongombe (Central African Republic)
25 August 2019
15:30 UTC+1

Elect-Sport (Chad)	2–0	(Gabon) Cercle Mbéri Sportif
Gamninga 53'; Seid 62'	Report

Stade Omnisports Idriss Mahamat Ouya, N'Djamena
Referee: Kabanga Malala (DR Congo)

Elect-Sport won 2–0 on aggregate.

10 August 2019
15:00 UTC+2

Green Mamba (Eswatini)	0–2	(Zambia) ZESCO United
	Report	Kasumba 9'; Ching'andu 53'

Mavuso Sports Centre, Manzini
Referee: Ishmael Chizinga (Malawi)
24 August 2019
15:00 UTC+2

ZESCO United (Zambia)	1–0	(Eswatini) Green Mamba
Were 14'	Report

Levy Mwanawasa Stadium, Ndola
Referee: Nehemia Shoovaleka (Namibia)

ZESCO United won 3–0 on aggregate.

10 August 2019
18:00 UTC+3

Young Africans (Tanzania)	1–1	(Botswana) Township Rollers
Sibomana 87' (pen.)	Report	Serameng 7'

National Stadium, Dar es Salaam
Referee: Georges Gatogato (Burundi)
24 August 2019
15:30 UTC+2

Township Rollers (Botswana)	0–1	(Tanzania) Young Africans
	Report	Balinya 41'

Botswana National Stadium, Gaborone
Referee: Abdoul Kanoso (Madagascar)

Young Africans won 2–1 on aggregate.

10 August 2019
14:30 UTC+2

Big Bullets (Malawi)	0–0	(Zimbabwe) FC Platinum
	Report

Kamuzu Stadium, Blantyre
Referee: Celso Alvacao (Mozambique)
24 August 2019
15:00 UTC+2

FC Platinum (Zimbabwe)	3–2	(Malawi) Big Bullets
Chafa 3'; Tigere 36'; Chikwende 80'	Report	Banda 30'; Phiri 74'

Barbourfields Stadium, Bulawayo
Referee: Janny Sikazwe (Zambia)

FC Platinum won 3–2 on aggregate.

10 August 2019
15:00 UTC+2

UD Songo (Mozambique)	0–0	(Tanzania) Simba
	Report

Estádio Chiveve, Beira
Referee: Imtehaz Heeralall (Mauritius)
25 August 2019
22:00 UTC+3

Simba (Tanzania)	1–1	(Mozambique) UD Songo
Nyoni 87' (pen.)	Report	Misquissone 14'

National Stadium, Dar es Salaam
Referee: Jean Claude Ishimwe (Rwanda)

1–1 on aggregate. UD Songo won on away goals.

10 August 2019
16:15 UTC+3

KMKM (Zanzibar)	0–2	(Angola) 1º de Agosto
	Report	Ary Papel 72'; Yombi 90+4'

Amaan Stadium, Zanzibar City
Referee: Ali Sabilla (Uganda)
24 August 2019
17:00 UTC+1

1º de Agosto (Angola)	2–0	(Zanzibar) KMKM
Mabululu 38', 69' (pen.)	Report

Estádio 11 de Novembro, Luanda
Referee: Victor Gomes (South Africa)

1º de Agosto won 4–0 on aggregate.

10 August 2019
15:00 UTC+2

Green Eagles (Zambia)	1–0	(South Africa) Orlando Pirates
Sautu 46'	Report

Nkoloma Stadium, Lusaka
Referee: Andofetra Rakotojaona (Madagascar)
23 August 2019
21:00 UTC+2

Orlando Pirates (South Africa)	1–1	(Zambia) Green Eagles
Jele 60'	Report	Shamende 81'

Orlando Stadium, Johannesburg
Referee: Bernard Camille (Seychelles)

Green Eagles won 2–1 on aggregate.

10 August 2019
14:30 UTC+3

Fosa Juniors (Madagascar)	1–0	(Mauritius) Pamplemousses
Rakotoarisoa 36' (pen.)	Report

Rabemananjara Stadium, Mahajanga
Referee: António Dungula (Angola)
25 August 2019
19:00 UTC+4

Pamplemousses (Mauritius)	1–1	(Madagascar) Fosa Juniors
Razah 12'	Report	Andriamamonjy 67'

Anjalay Stadium, Mapou
Referee: Joshua Bondo (Botswana)

Fosa Juniors won 2–1 on aggregate.

== First round ==
The first round, also called the second preliminary round, included 32 teams: the 3 teams that received byes to this round, and the 29 winners of the preliminary round.

Team 1	Agg.	Team 2	1st leg	2nd leg
Al-Nasr (Libya)	2–4	(Morocco) Raja Casablanca	1–3	1–1
JS Kabylie (Algeria)	2–2 (5–3 p)	(Guinea) Horoya	2–0	0–2
ASC Kara (Togo)	0–1	(Democratic Republic of the Congo) AS Vita Club	0–0	0–1
Enyimba (Nigeria)	0–1	(Sudan) Al-Hilal	0–0	0–1
USM Alger (Algeria)	6–1	(Kenya) Gor Mahia	4–1	2–0
Cano Sport (Equatorial Guinea)	0–6	(Egypt) Al-Ahly	0–2	0–4
Génération Foot (Senegal)	2–2 (a)	(Egypt) Zamalek	2–1	0–1
Asante Kotoko (Ghana)	2–3	(Tunisia) Étoile du Sahel	2–0	0–3
Petro de Luanda (Angola)	1–1 (a)	(Uganda) KCCA	0–0	1–1
Côte d'Or (Seychelles)	1–16	(South Africa) Mamelodi Sundowns	0–5	1–11
FC Nouadhibou (Mauritania)	1–6	(Morocco) Wydad AC	0–2	1–4
Elect-Sport (Chad)	2–3	(Tunisia) Espérance de Tunis	1–1	1–2
Young Africans (Tanzania)	2–3	(Zambia) ZESCO United	1–1	1–2
FC Platinum (Zimbabwe)	5–2	(Mozambique) UD Songo	1–0	4–2
Green Eagles (Zambia)	2–2 (a)	(Angola) 1º de Agosto	1–2	1–0
Fosa Juniors (Madagascar)	1–3	(Democratic Republic of the Congo) TP Mazembe	0–0	1–3

15 September 2019
20:00 UTC+2

Al-Nasr (Libya)	1–3	(Morocco) Raja Casablanca
Sherif 71'	Report	Ngoma 51'; Nanah 72'; Moutouali 85'

Petro Sport Stadium, Cairo (Egypt)
Referee: Lofti Bekouassa (Algeria)
28 September 2019
19:00 UTC+1

Raja Casablanca (Morocco)	1–1	(Libya) Al-Nasr
Moutouali 8'	Report	Figongang 23'

Stade Mohammed V, Casablanca
Referee: Elsiddig Mohamed Eltreefe (Sudan)

Raja Casablanca won 4–2 on aggregate.

14 September 2019
19:30 UTC+1

JS Kabylie (Algeria)	2–0	(Guinea) Horoya
Banouh 52', 67'	Report

Stade du 1er Novembre 1954, Tizi Ouzou
Referee: Mehrez Melki (Tunisia)
29 September 2019
16:00 UTC+0

Horoya (Guinea)	2–0	(Algeria) JS Kabylie
Bancé 80'; Makambo 90+1'	Report
Penalties
Makambo (penalty missed); Nikièma (penalty scored); Kutinyu (penalty scored); Hudu (penalty scored)	3–5	(penalty scored) Addadi; (penalty scored) Oukaci; (penalty scored) Belaïli; (penalty scored) Zeghdane; (penalty scored) Bencherifa

Stade du 28 Septembre, Conakry
Referee: Samir Guezzaz (Morocco)

2–2 on aggregate. JS Kabylie won 5–4 on penalties.

15 September 2019
16:00 UTC+0

ASC Kara (Togo)	0–0	(Democratic Republic of the Congo) AS Vita Club
	Report

Stade de Kégué, Lomé
Referee: Salisu Basheer (Nigeria)
29 September 2019
15:30 UTC+1

AS Vita Club (Democratic Republic of the Congo)	1–0	(Togo) ASC Kara
Kikasa 45' (pen.)	Report

Stade des Martyrs, Kinshasa
Referee: Souleiman Ahmed Djama (Djibouti)

AS Vita Club won 1–0 on aggregate.

15 September 2019
16:00 UTC+1

Enyimba (Nigeria)	0–0	(Sudan) Al-Hilal
	Report

Enyimba International Stadium, Aba
Referee: Jean-Jacques Ngambo Ndala (DR Congo)
29 September 2019
19:30 UTC+2

Al-Hilal (Sudan)	1–0	(Nigeria) Enyimba
Aldai 48'	Report

Al-Hilal Stadium, Omdurman
Referee: Eric Arnaud Otogo Castane (Gabon)

Al-Hilal won 1–0 on aggregate.

15 September 2019
20:45 UTC+1

USM Alger (Algeria)	4–1	(Kenya) Gor Mahia
Meftah 17', 45+1' (pen.); Benchaâ 45+2', 76'	Report	Muguna 56' (pen.)

Stade Mustapha Tchaker, Blida
Referee: Bakary Papa Gassama (Gambia)
29 September 2019
16:00 UTC+3

Gor Mahia (Kenya)	0–2	(Algeria) USM Alger
	Report	Mahious 4', 16'

Moi International Sports Centre, Kasarani
Referee: Alioum Alioum (Cameroon)

USM Alger won 6–1 on aggregate.

14 September 2019
17:00 UTC+1

Cano Sport (Equatorial Guinea)	0–2	(Egypt) Al-Ahly
	Report	S. Mohsen 65'; Soliman 84'

Estadio de Malabo, Malabo
Referee: Ahmed Sekou Touré (Guinea)
28 September 2019
20:00 UTC+2

Al-Ahly (Egypt)	4–0	(Equatorial Guinea) Cano Sport
Dieng 8'; Ajayi 49'; El Shahat 55'; S. Mohsen 86'	Report

Al Salam Stadium, Cairo
Referee: Joshua Bondo (Botswana)

Al-Ahly won 6–0 on aggregate.

14 September 2019
18:00 UTC+0

Génération Foot (Senegal)	2–1	(Egypt) Zamalek
Gueye 12', 68'	Report	Mostafa 74'

Stade Lat-Dior, Thiès
Referee: Beida Dahane (Mauritania)
24 October 2019 (Note: The Zamalek v Génération Foot match was originally scheduled to be played on 28 September at Petro Sport Stadium, Cairo, but was postponed to 29 September and moved to Borg El Arab Stadium, Alexandria on 27 September following requests from the local security forces, but Génération Foot refused to play the match in Alexandria. The CAF announced on 8 October that the match would be replayed on 24 October 2019 in Cairo.)
20:00 UTC+2

Zamalek (Egypt)	1–0	(Senegal) Génération Foot
Diop 20' (o.g.)	Report

Al Salam Stadium, Cairo
Referee: Sidi Alioum (Cameroon)

2–2 on aggregate. Zamalek won on away goals.

15 September 2019
15:00 UTC+0

Asante Kotoko (Ghana)	2–0	(Tunisia) Étoile du Sahel
Okrah 5'; Arthur 55'	Report

Baba Yara Stadium, Kumasi
Referee: Hassen Corneh (Liberia)
29 September 2019
17:00 UTC+1

Étoile du Sahel (Tunisia)	3–0	(Ghana) Asante Kotoko
Ben Ouanes 25' (pen.); Aribi 67', 85'	Report

Stade Mustapha Ben Jannet, Monastir
Referee: Ibrahim Nour El Din (Egypt)

Étoile du Sahel won 3–2 on aggregate.

14 September 2019
16:00 UTC+1

Petro de Luanda (Angola)	0–0	(Uganda) KCCA
	Report

Estádio 11 de Novembro, Luanda
Referee: Belay Tadesse (Ethiopia)
27 September 2019
16:00 UTC+3

KCCA (Uganda)	1–1	(Angola) Petro de Luanda
Kizza 57'	Report	Job 34' (pen.)

Startimes Stadium, Kampala
Referee: Ahmad Imtehaz Heeralall (Mauritius)

1–1 on aggregate. Petro de Luanda won on away goals.

14 September 2019
16:00 UTC+4

Côte d'Or (Seychelles)	0–5	(South Africa) Mamelodi Sundowns
	Report	Mabunda 5', 74'; Lakay 68'; Mkhulise 70'; Arendse 84'

Stade Linité, Victoria
Referee: Celso Armindo Alvacao (Mozambique)
27 September 2019
19:00 UTC+2

Mamelodi Sundowns (South Africa)	11–1	(Seychelles) Côte d'Or
T. Zwane 9'; Sirino 11'; Vilakazi 21', 24'; Manyisa 37'; Morena 43'; Madisha 47'; Ngcongca 58'; N. Zwane 74'; Marie 77' (o.g.); Affonso 83'	Report	Voavy 79'

Lucas Masterpieces Moripe Stadium, Pretoria
Referee: Ali Mohamed Adelaid (Comoros)

Mamelodi Sundowns won 16–1 on aggregate.

15 September 2019
17:00 UTC+0

FC Nouadhibou (Mauritania)	0–2	(Morocco) Wydad AC
	Report	Nahiri 34'; El Haddad 73'

Stade Cheikha Ould Boïdiya, Nouakchott
Referee: Kokou Ognankotan Ntale (Togo)
29 September 2019
20:00 UTC+1

Wydad AC (Morocco)	4–1	(Mauritania) FC Nouadhibou
Nahiri 13' (pen.); El Haddad 25'; El Hassouni 26'; El Kaabi 38'	Report	Bagili 67'

Stade Mohammed V, Casablanca
Referee: Sadok Selmi (Tunisia)

Wydad AC won 6–1 on aggregate.

15 September 2019
15:30 UTC+1

Elect-Sport (Chad)	1–1	(Tunisia) Espérance de Tunis
Djibrine 76'	Report	Ben Choug 66'

Stade Omnisports Idriss Mahamat Ouya, N'Djamena
Referee: Bienvenu Sinko (Ivory Coast)
27 September 2019
19:00 UTC+1

Espérance de Tunis (Tunisia)	2–1	(Chad) Elect-Sport
Ouattara 62'; Benguit 83'	Report	Ibrahim 38'

Stade Olympique de Radès, Tunis
Referee: Tsegay Mogos Mogos Teklu (Eritrea)

Espérance de Tunis won 3–2 on aggregate.

14 September 2019
16:00 UTC+3

Young Africans (Tanzania)	1–1	(Zambia) ZESCO United
Sibomana 24' (pen.)	Report	Kamusoko 90+6'

National Stadium, Dar es Salaam
Referee: Helder Martins De Carvalho (Angola)
28 September 2019
15:00 UTC+2

ZESCO United (Zambia)	2–1	(Tanzania) Young Africans
Were 24'; Makame 78' (o.g.)	Report	Urikhob 30'

Levy Mwanawasa Stadium, Ndola
Referee: Andofetra Rakotojaona (Madagascar)

ZESCO United won 3–2 on aggregate.

14 September 2019
15:00 UTC+2

FC Platinum (Zimbabwe)	1–0	(Mozambique) UD Songo
Tigere 21'	Report

Barbourfields Stadium, Bulawayo
Referee: Peter Waweru (Kenya)
28 September 2019
15:00 UTC+2

UD Songo (Mozambique)	2–4	(Zimbabwe) FC Platinum
Banda 10'; Cremildo 26'	Report	Chinyengetere 52', 89', 90+4' (pen.); Tigere 60' (pen.)

Estádio do Ferroviário, Beira
Referee: Bernard Camille (Seychelles)

FC Platinum won 5–2 on aggregate.

14 September 2019
15:00 UTC+2

Green Eagles (Zambia)	1–2	(Angola) 1º de Agosto
Shamende 77'	Report	Mabululu 27'; Ngudikama 86'

National Heroes Stadium, Lusaka
Referee: Victor Gomes (South Africa)
29 September 2019
17:00 UTC+1

1º de Agosto (Angola)	0–1	(Zambia) Green Eagles
	Report	Kaseba 43'

Estádio 11 de Novembro, Luanda
Referee: Bamlak Tessema Weyesa (Ethiopia)

2–2 on aggregate. 1º de Agosto won on away goals.

15 September 2019
14:30 UTC+3

Fosa Juniors (Madagascar)	0–0	(Democratic Republic of the Congo) TP Mazembe
	Report

Rabemananjara Stadium, Mahajanga
Referee: Norman Matemera (Zimbabwe)
29 September 2019
15:30 UTC+2

TP Mazembe (Democratic Republic of the Congo)	3–1	(Madagascar) Fosa Juniors
Koffi 10', 60' (pen.); Ushindi 56'	Report	Andriamamonjy 40'

Stade Frederic Kibassa Maliba, Lubumbashi
Referee: Pacifique Ndabihawenimana (Burundi)

TP Mazembe won 3–1 on aggregate.
