= 2019 FIFA Beach Soccer World Cup squads =

The 2019 FIFA Beach Soccer World Cup was an international beach soccer tournament held in Paraguay from 21 November to 1 December 2019. The 16 national teams involved in the tournament were required by FIFA to register a squad of 12 players, including two goalkeepers. Only players in these squads were eligible to take part in the tournament which was revealed on 15 November 2019.

This article lists the national beach soccer squads that took part in the tournament. The age listed for each player is as on 21 November 2019, the first day of the tournament and the names of the players shown are that of the FIFA Display Names listed on the official squad document issued by FIFA.

== Group A ==
=== Paraguay ===
Coach: (Brazil) Gustavo Zloccowick

The final squad was announced on 12 November 2019.

No.	Pos.	Player	Date of birth (age)	Club
1	GK	Carlos Ovelar	30 August 1998 (aged 21)	(Paraguayan Football Association) Libertad
2	MF	Juan López	7 December 1987 (aged 31)	(Paraguayan Football Association) Selección Encarnacena
3	DF	Gustavo Benítez	13 June 1981 (aged 38)	(Paraguayan Football Association) Selección Encarnacena
4	FW	Luis Ojeda	18 October 1990 (aged 29)	(Paraguayan Football Association) Náutico Puerta
5	FW	Jesús Rolón	30 November 1990 (aged 28)	(Paraguayan Football Association) Selección Aregueña
6	MF	Pedro Morán (captain)	9 June 1990 (aged 29)	(Paraguayan Football Association) Casa España
7	FW	Édgar Barreto	28 September 1988 (aged 31)	(Paraguayan Football Association) Deportivo Sajonia
8	MF	Carlos Carballo	31 January 1993 (aged 26)	(Paraguayan Football Association) Náutico Puerta
9	MF	Carlos Benítez	20 January 1999 (aged 20)	(Paraguayan Football Association) Libertad
10	MF	Rodrigo Escobar	9 September 1998 (aged 21)	(Paraguayan Football Association) Libertad
11	DF	Sergio González	23 February 1989 (aged 30)	(Paraguayan Football Association) Casa España
12	GK	Yoao Rolón	23 August 1996 (aged 23)	(Paraguayan Football Association) Cerro Porteño

=== Japan ===
Coach: Ruy Ramos

The final squad was announced on 11 November 2019.

No.	Pos.	Player	Date of birth (age)	Club
1	GK	Shingo Terukina	8 September 1984 (aged 35)	(Japan Football Association) Ryukyu Erythrina
2	FW	Takuya Akaguma	21 November 1989 (aged 30)	(Japan Football Association) Dorsole Kitakyushu
3	MF	Tomoyuki Iino	29 January 1985 (aged 34)	(Japan Football Association) Dorsole Kitakyushu
4	MF	Kosuke Matsuda	26 September 1986 (aged 33)	(Japan Football Association) Loewe Yokohama
5	DF	Teruki Tabata	16 April 1979 (aged 40)	(Japan Football Association) Veertien Mie BS
6	MF	Naoya Matsuo	18 August 1988 (aged 31)	(Japan Football Association) Pracia Yamaguchi
7	MF	Takaaki Oba	24 December 1992 (aged 26)	(Japan Football Association) Tokyo Verdy BS
8	MF	Masayuki Komaki	30 August 1982 (aged 37)	(Japan Football Association) Veertien Mie BS
9	FW	Shusei Yamauchi	9 September 1985 (aged 34)	(Japan Football Association) Tokyo Verdy BS
10	DF	Ozu Moreira (captain)	21 January 1986 (aged 33)	(Japan Football Association) Tokyo Verdy BS
11	FW	Masanori Okuyama	7 June 1986 (aged 33)	(Japan Football Association) Loewe Yokohama
12	GK	Tomoya Ginoza	2 April 1985 (aged 34)	(Japan Football Association) Veertien Mie BS

=== Switzerland ===
Coach: Angelo Schirinzi

The final squad was announced on 13 November 2019.

No.	Pos.	Player	Date of birth (age)	Club
1	GK	Eliott Mounoud	10 August 1995 (aged 24)	(Royal Spanish Football Federation) BSC Torredembarra
2	MF	Daniele Pichierri	3 March 1991 (aged 28)	Unattached
3	MF	Angelo Wüest	28 March 1990 (aged 29)	Unattached
4	MF	Philipp Borer	15 June 1990 (aged 29)	(Swiss Football Association) BSC Chargers Baselland
5	MF	Jan Ostgen	11 June 1996 (aged 23)	(Swiss Football Association) BSC Havana Shots Aargau
6	MF	Tobias Steinemann	6 June 1996 (aged 23)	(Swiss Football Association) BSC Havana Shots Aargau
7	DF	Sandro Spaccarotella	5 August 1982 (aged 37)	(Swiss Football Association) Grasshoppers
8	DF	Mo Jaeggy (captain)	1 January 1983 (aged 36)	(Swiss Football Association) BSC Chargers Baselland
9	FW	Dejan Stankovic	25 August 1985 (aged 34)	(Swiss Football Association) Grasshoppers
10	FW	Noël Ott	15 January 1994 (aged 25)	(Swiss Football Association) Grasshoppers
11	FW	Glenn Hodel	22 November 1996 (aged 22)	(Swiss Football Association) Grasshoppers
12	GK	Valentin Jaeggy	19 October 1986 (aged 33)	Unattached

=== United States ===
Coach: Eddie Soto

The final squad was announced on 8 November 2019.

No.	Pos.	Player	Date of birth (age)	Club
1	GK	Christopher Toth	4 August 1989 (aged 30)	(United States Soccer Federation) Ontario Fury
2	DF	Jason Leopoldo	21 June 1987 (aged 32)	Unattached
3	DF	Ryan Futagaki	17 January 1980 (aged 39)	Unattached
4	DF	Gabriel Silveira	28 April 1992 (aged 27)	Unattached
5	DF	Adriano dos Santos	19 June 1987 (aged 32)	(United States Soccer Federation) Baltimore Blast
6	DF	Jason Santos	29 June 1988 (aged 31)	Unattached
7	FW	Nick Perera (captain)	5 June 1986 (aged 33)	(United States Soccer Federation) Tacoma Stars
8	FW	Lucas Roque	5 March 1988 (aged 31)	Unattached
9	FW	Alessandro Canale	29 December 1989 (aged 29)	Unattached
10	DF	Oscar Reyes	4 February 1990 (aged 29)	Unattached
11	DF	David Mondragon	18 October 1991 (aged 28)	Unattached
12	GK	Juan Cervantes	21 February 1994 (aged 25)	Unattached

== Group B ==
=== Uruguay ===
Coach: Miguel Zabala

The final squad was announced on 11 November 2019.

No.	Pos.	Player	Date of birth (age)	Club
1	GK	Gustavo Sebe	23 April 1979 (aged 40)	(Uruguayan Football Association) Racing
2	DF	Guillermo Costa	28 July 1989 (aged 30)	(Uruguayan Football Association) Centro Atlético Fénix
3	MF	Santiago Miranda	10 August 1992 (aged 27)	(Uruguayan Football Association) Bella Vista
4	DF	Juan Dutra	8 January 1982 (aged 37)	(Uruguayan Football Association) Bella Vista
5	MF	Gastón Laduche (captain)	6 July 1995 (aged 24)	(Uruguayan Football Association) Malvín
6	DF	Matías Cabrera	5 November 1985 (aged 34)	(Uruguayan Football Association) Malvín
7	DF	Luis Quinta	10 May 1990 (aged 29)	(Uruguayan Football Association) Bella Vista
8	FW	Gonzalo Cazet	25 March 1986 (aged 33)	(Uruguayan Football Association) Bella Vista
9	FW	Andrés Laens	4 October 1997 (aged 22)	(Uruguayan Football Association) Racing
10	FW	Marcelo Capurro	4 November 1981 (aged 38)	(Uruguayan Football Association) Racing
11	DF	Nicolás Bella	2 March 1987 (aged 32)	(Uruguayan Football Association) Malvín
12	GK	Alejandro Guerrero	29 March 1987 (aged 32)	(Uruguayan Football Association) Bella Vista

=== Mexico ===
Coach: Ramón Raya

The final squad was announced on 15 November 2019.

No.	Pos.	Player	Date of birth (age)	Club
1	GK	Diego Villaseñor	22 May 1987 (aged 32)	Unattached
2	MF	Ángel Rodríguez	21 February 1985 (aged 34)	Unattached
3	DF	Carlos Hernández	18 June 1991 (aged 28)	Unattached
4	DF	Edgar Portilla	29 March 1995 (aged 24)	Unattached
5	DF	Benjamín Mosco (captain)	2 September 1985 (aged 34)	Unattached
6	MF	Néstor Martínez	3 February 1993 (aged 26)	Unattached
7	FW	Ramón Maldonado	25 April 1988 (aged 31)	Unattached
8	MF	Érick Sámano	4 June 1991 (aged 28)	Unattached
9	FW	Ulises Pineda	21 March 1992 (aged 27)	Unattached
10	MF	Abdiel Villa	16 March 1983 (aged 36)	Unattached
11	MF	José Vizcarra	21 December 1990 (aged 28)	Unattached
12	GK	Gabriel Macías	19 October 1991 (aged 28)	Unattached

=== Italy ===
Coach: Emiliano del Duca

The final squad was announced on 12 November 2019.

No.	Pos.	Player	Date of birth (age)	Club
1	GK	Simone del Mestre	28 August 1983 (aged 36)	(Italian Football Federation) Catania BS
2	MF	Josep Junior Gentilin	19 April 2000 (aged 19)	(Italian Football Federation) Sambenedettese
3	FW	Marcello Percia Montani	10 February 1988 (aged 31)	(Italian Football Federation) Sambenedettese
4	DF	Alfio Chiavaro	2 June 1983 (aged 36)	(Italian Football Federation) Palazzolo
5	MF	Alessio Frainetti	22 March 1986 (aged 33)	(Italian Football Federation) Terracina
6	MF	Simone Marinai	9 July 1988 (aged 31)	(Italian Football Federation) Esperia Viareggio
7	MF	Dario Ramacciotti	4 October 1987 (aged 32)	(Italian Football Federation) Esperia Viareggio
8	DF	Francesco Corosiniti (captain)	6 July 1984 (aged 35)	(Italian Football Federation) Real Cerva
9	FW	Emmanuele Zurlo	27 February 1988 (aged 31)	(Italian Football Federation) Catania BS
10	FW	Gabriele Gori	10 October 1987 (aged 32)	(Italian Football Federation) Castelnuovo Garfagnana
11	MF	Paolo Palmacci	17 May 1984 (aged 35)	(Italian Football Federation) Terracina
12	GK	Andrea Carpita	27 May 1988 (aged 31)	(Italian Football Federation) Viareggio BS

=== Tahiti ===
Coach: Naea Bennett

The final squad was announced on 15 November 2019.

No.	Pos.	Player	Date of birth (age)	Club
1	GK	Jonathan Torohia	22 February 1985 (aged 34)	(Tahitian Football Federation) Manu-Ura
2	DF	Angelo Tchen	8 March 1982 (aged 37)	(Tahitian Football Federation) Tefana
3	DF	Ariihau Teriitau	23 January 1989 (aged 30)	(Tahitian Football Federation) Pirae
4	MF	Heimanu Taiarui	24 August 1986 (aged 33)	(Tahitian Football Federation) Pirae
5	FW	Gervais Chan-Kat	16 November 1992 (aged 27)	(Tahitian Football Federation) Arue
6	MF	Patrick Tepa	28 May 1989 (aged 30)	(Tahitian Football Federation) Tiare
7	FW	Raimana Li Fung Kuee (captain)	10 April 1985 (aged 34)	(Tahitian Football Federation) Pirae
8	FW	Heiarii Tavanae	15 February 1992 (aged 27)	(Tahitian Football Federation) Central Sport
9	FW	Alvin Tehau	10 April 1989 (aged 30)	(Tahitian Football Federation) Tefana
10	FW	Tearii Labaste	19 July 1991 (aged 28)	(Tahitian Football Federation) Pirae
11	MF	Heirauarii Salem	23 April 1998 (aged 21)	(Tahitian Football Federation) Pirae
12	GK	Franck Revel	18 July 1984 (aged 35)	(Tahitian Football Federation) Pirae

== Group C ==
=== Belarus ===
Coach: (Spain) Nicolás Caporale

No.	Pos.	Player	Date of birth (age)	Club
1	GK	Kanstantsin Mahaletski	21 October 1991 (aged 28)	(Football Federation of Belarus) Kirovsk-SDUSHOR
2	DF	Vadzim Bokach	25 January 1984 (aged 35)	(Russian Football Union) FK Elmont
3	DF	Illia Savich	2 March 1991 (aged 28)	(Football Federation of Belarus) Grodnooblsport
4	DF	Mikita Chaikouski	21 May 1998 (aged 21)	(Football Federation of Belarus) Grodnooblsport
5	FW	Dzianis Samsonov	20 July 1991 (aged 28)	(Football Federation of Belarus) Grodnooblsport
6	DF	Yury Piatrouski	6 May 1994 (aged 25)	(Football Federation of Belarus) Kirovsk-SDUSHOR
7	DF	Ivan Miranovich (captain)	29 July 1985 (aged 34)	(Russian Football Union) Krylia Sovetov Samara
8	FW	Ihar Bryshtsel	13 July 1987 (aged 32)	(Russian Football Union) Kristall
9	FW	Aleh Hapon	11 September 1996 (aged 23)	(Russian Football Union) Spartak Moscow
10	FW	Anatoliy Ryabko	9 October 1989 (aged 30)	(Russian Football Union) FK Elmont
11	DF	Ivan Kanstantsinau	8 July 1989 (aged 30)	(Russian Football Union) Lokomotiv Moscow
12	GK	Valery Makarevich	3 December 1983 (aged 35)	(Russian Football Union) Krylia Sovetov Samara

=== United Arab Emirates ===
Coach: Mohamed Bashir

The final squad was announced on 11 November 2019.

No.	Pos.	Player	Date of birth (age)	Club
1	GK	Mohamed Al-Jasmi	7 September 1988 (aged 31)	(United Arab Emirates Football Association) Al-Ahli
2	DF	Haitham Mohamed	21 June 1980 (aged 39)	(United Arab Emirates Football Association) Al-Ahli
3	MF	Ahmed Beshr	11 February 1989 (aged 30)	Unattached
4	DF	Waleed Beshr	29 May 1991 (aged 28)	Unattached
5	MF	Abbas Ali	25 January 1989 (aged 30)	(United Arab Emirates Football Association) Al-Ahli
6	FW	Kamal Ali	7 May 1989 (aged 30)	(United Arab Emirates Football Association) Al-Ahli
7	FW	Hesham Muntaser	30 June 1995 (aged 24)	Unattached
8	MF	Ali Mohammad	19 August 1996 (aged 23)	Unattached
9	MF	Ali Karim	25 April 1980 (aged 39)	(United Arab Emirates Football Association) Al-Nasr
10	DF	Walid Mohammad (captain)	1 April 1984 (aged 35)	(United Arab Emirates Football Association) Al-Nasr
11	MF	Ahmad Malahi	29 April 1991 (aged 28)	(United Arab Emirates Football Association) Al-Nasr
12	GK	Mohamed Hamza	17 September 1982 (aged 37)	(United Arab Emirates Football Association) Al-Nasr

=== Senegal ===
Coach: Oumar Sylla

No.	Pos.	Player	Date of birth (age)	Club
1	GK	Al Seyni Ndiaye (captain)	31 December 1989 (aged 29)	(German Football Association) Real Münster
2	DF	Ninou Diatta	5 October 1987 (aged 32)	(Senegalese Football Federation) Golf Beach Club
3	DF	Ibra Thioune	23 October 1985 (aged 34)	(Senegalese Football Federation) Beach Foot Association
4	FW	Raoul Mendy	30 December 1992 (aged 26)	(Oman Football Association) Mirbat
5	DF	Mamadou Sylla	20 July 1991 (aged 28)	(Senegalese Football Federation) Beach Foot Association
6	DF	Limamou Niang	2 November 1999 (aged 20)	(Senegalese Football Federation) Kawsara BS
7	MF	Babacar Fall	5 March 1989 (aged 30)	(Senegalese Football Federation) Yeumbeul BS
8	MF	Hamad Diouf	30 December 1997 (aged 21)	(Senegalese Football Federation) APLN
9	FW	Lansana Diassy	6 April 1990 (aged 29)	(Senegalese Football Federation) Golf Beach Club
10	MF	Mamour Diagne	4 October 1990 (aged 29)	(Senegalese Football Federation) Beach Foot Association
11	MF	Jean-Charles Bleck	16 October 1995 (aged 24)	(Senegalese Football Federation) Golf Beach Club
12	GK	Amadou Ba	13 September 1987 (aged 32)	(Senegalese Football Federation) Vision Sport

=== Russia ===
Coach: Mikhail Likhachev

The final squad was announced on 14 November 2019.

No.	Pos.	Player	Date of birth (age)	Club
1	GK	Maxim Chuzhkov	11 April 1987 (aged 32)	(Russian Football Union) Kristall
2	DF	Andrei Novikov	7 February 1996 (aged 23)	(Russian Football Union) Spartak Moscow
3	FW	Kirill Romanov	20 January 1990 (aged 29)	(Russian Football Union) Kristall
4	FW	Aleksey Makarov	20 August 1987 (aged 32)	(Russian Football Union) Spartak Moscow
5	DF	Yuri Krasheninnikov	19 December 1984 (aged 34)	(Russian Football Union) Kristall
6	FW	Dmitry Shishin	14 March 1986 (aged 33)	(Russian Football Union) Kristall
7	DF	Anton Shkarin (captain)	15 November 1982 (aged 37)	(Russian Football Union) Spartak Moscow
8	FW	Ostap Fedorov	18 November 1995 (aged 24)	(Russian Football Union) Lokomotiv Moscow
9	FW	Boris Nikonorov	3 April 1989 (aged 30)	(Russian Football Union) Lokomotiv Moscow
10	DF	Artur Paporotnyi	28 November 1985 (aged 33)	(Russian Football Union) Kristall
11	FW	Fedor Zemskov	13 January 1988 (aged 31)	(Russian Football Union) Spartak Moscow
12	GK	Pavel Bazhenov	2 January 1990 (aged 29)	(Russian Football Union) Spartak Moscow

== Group D ==
=== Brazil ===
Coach: Gilberto Costa

The final squad was announced on 13 November 2019.

No.	Pos.	Player	Date of birth (age)	Club
1	GK	Mão	6 December 1978 (aged 40)	(Brazilian Football Confederation) Anchieta
2	DF	Rafinha	10 November 1988 (aged 31)	(Brazilian Football Confederation) Vasco da Gama
3	DF	Antonio	2 October 1995 (aged 24)	(Brazilian Football Confederation) Flamengo
4	DF	Diogo Catarino	9 January 1990 (aged 29)	(Brazilian Football Confederation) Vasco da Gama
5	MF	Filipe	12 September 1993 (aged 26)	(Brazilian Football Confederation) Sport Recife
6	MF	Lucão	4 August 1991 (aged 28)	(Brazilian Football Confederation) Vasco da Gama
7	FW	Bokinha	6 January 1991 (aged 28)	(Brazilian Football Confederation) Vasco da Gama
8	DF	Bruno Xavier (captain)	15 August 1984 (aged 35)	(Brazilian Football Confederation) Centro de Treinamento Missao
9	FW	Rodrigo	16 August 1993 (aged 26)	(Brazilian Football Confederation) Botafogo
10	FW	Datinha	12 April 1988 (aged 31)	(Brazilian Football Confederation) Sampaio Corrêa
11	FW	Mauricinho	9 December 1989 (aged 29)	(Brazilian Football Confederation) Vasco da Gama
12	GK	Rafa Padilha	11 May 1993 (aged 26)	(Brazilian Football Confederation) Vasco da Gama

=== Oman ===
Coach: Talib Al-Thanawi

The preliminary squad was announced on 3 November 2019.

No.	Pos.	Player	Date of birth (age)	Club
1	GK	Amjad Al-Hamdani	13 May 1994 (aged 25)	(Oman Football Association) Al-Mussanah
2	MF	Abdullah Saleh	31 December 1985 (aged 33)	(Oman Football Association) Al-Salam
3	DF	Jalal Al-Sinani	17 November 1986 (aged 33)	(Oman Football Association) Quriyat
4	MF	Eid Al-Farsi	17 April 1989 (aged 30)	Unattached
5	DF	Mandhar Al-Araimi	22 May 1984 (aged 35)	(Oman Football Association) Al-Orouba
6	DF	Mushel Al-Araimi	9 March 1986 (aged 33)	Unattached
7	DF	Ahmed Al-Masharfi	7 February 1988 (aged 31)	Unattached
8	MF	Nooh Al-Zadjali	10 August 1991 (aged 28)	(Oman Football Association) Al-Mussanah
9	FW	Sami Al-Bulushi	4 September 1994 (aged 25)	(Oman Football Association) Al-Shabab
10	FW	Khalid Al-Oraimi (captain)	17 March 1992 (aged 27)	(Oman Football Association) Al-Orouba
11	FW	Sharif Al-Bulushi	30 December 1990 (aged 28)	(Oman Football Association) Al-Shabab
12	GK	Younis Al-Owaisi	29 January 1993 (aged 26)	(Oman Football Association) Al-Shabab

=== Portugal ===
Coach: Mário Narciso

The final squad was announced on 13 November 2019.

No.	Pos.	Player	Date of birth (age)	Club
1	GK	Tiago Petrony	18 November 1988 (aged 31)	(Portuguese Football Federation) Sporting CP
2	DF	Rui Coimbra	14 April 1986 (aged 33)	(Portuguese Football Federation) Sporting CP
3	DF	André Lourenço	20 September 1995 (aged 24)	(Portuguese Football Federation) GR Amigos Paz
4	DF	Bruno Torres	21 April 1980 (aged 39)	(Portuguese Football Federation) Braga
5	MF	Jordan Santos	2 July 1991 (aged 28)	(Portuguese Football Federation) Braga
6	MF	Rúben Brilhante	1 December 2000 (aged 18)	(Portuguese Football Federation) Sótão
7	MF	Madjer (captain)	22 January 1977 (aged 42)	(Portuguese Football Federation) Sporting CP
8	MF	Bê Martins	29 December 1989 (aged 29)	(Portuguese Football Federation) Braga
9	FW	João Gonçalves	9 May 1995 (aged 24)	(Portuguese Football Federation) Casa Benfica Loures
10	FW	Belchior	9 October 1982 (aged 37)	(Portuguese Football Federation) Sporting CP
11	FW	Léo Martins	29 December 1989 (aged 29)	(Brazilian Football Confederation) Flamengo
12	GK	Elinton Andrade	30 March 1979 (aged 40)	(Royal Spanish Football Federation) FC Barcelona

=== Nigeria ===
Coach: Audu Adamu

The final squad was announced on 6 November 2019.

No.	Pos.	Player	Date of birth (age)	Club
1	GK	Danjuma Paul	18 December 1992 (aged 26)	(Nigeria Football Federation) Katsina United
2	DF	Emmanuel Ohwoferia	10 December 1992 (aged 26)	(Nigeria Football Federation) Owibeseb
3	FW	Egan-Osi Ekujumi	2 August 1998 (aged 21)	(Nigeria Football Federation) Leeds
4	DF	Adams Taiwo	22 October 1992 (aged 27)	(Nigeria Football Federation) Owibeseb
5	DF	Godspower Igudia	13 August 1993 (aged 26)	(Nigeria Football Federation) Akwa United
6	DF	Victor Tale (captain)	9 September 1989 (aged 30)	(Nigeria Football Federation) Kogi United
7	FW	Godwin Zaki	10 November 1994 (aged 25)	Unattached
8	FW	Azeez Abu	31 May 1994 (aged 25)	(Nigeria Football Federation) Enyimba
9	FW	Fuwad Badmus	20 August 1993 (aged 26)	(Nigeria Football Federation) Owibeseb
10	FW	Emeka Ogbonna	11 January 1992 (aged 27)	(Nigeria Football Federation) Leeds
11	DF	Hammed Kareem	19 September 1997 (aged 22)	(Nigeria Football Federation) Owibeseb
12	GK	Godwin Tale	11 November 2000 (aged 19)	(Nigeria Football Federation) Kaduna United

== Statistics ==
Overall, 192 players have travelled to Paraguay to compete in the tournament.

Fourteen of the sixteen managers are managing their own nation's national team whilst two manage foreign teams in respect to their own nationality.

Youngest v Oldest

	Name	Nation	DoB/Age	Age difference
Youngest Player	Rúben Brilhante	Portugal	1 December 2000 (aged 18)	23 years 10 months 9 days
Oldest Player	Madjer	Portugal	22 January 1977 (aged 42)	23 years 10 months 9 days

Average age of squads

Average age	Nation(s)
25	Nigeria
26	—
27	Paraguay
28	Belarus; Senegal
29	Switzerland; Brazil
30	Mexico; Oman
31	United States; Tahiti; United Arab Emirates; Russia; Portugal
32	Uruguay; Italy
33	Japan

Players by age category

Age category	No. of players
18–22	14
23–27	42
28–32	79
33–37	46
38–42	11
