= Samano =

Sámano is a surname. Notable persons with this name include:

- Érick Sámano (born 1991), Mexican footballer
- Eva Sámano (1910–1984), Mexican educator and first lady of Mexico
- Juan José de Sámano y Uribarri (1753–1821), Spanish soldier
- Miguel Sámano Peralta (born 1966), Mexican politician
- Jeanette Sámano, actress
- Lupe Sámano, patient on My 600-lb Life
- Samano, a city in Cantabria, Spain
