= Sarpong =

Sarpong is an Ashanti surname. It means supreme. The first part of the name SA is of Arabic root and means supreme. While the second part, 'Pong', is Akan and also means supreme. The first syllable 'SA' is also an Akan word meaning 'War'. 'Pɔn' means great or supreme. So Sarpong or Sapɔn means 'Great Warrior' or supreme warrior. On the other hand, the name also refers to a person born during a great war. Notable people with this surname include:

- Nana Akuoko Sarpong, Ɔmanhene of Agogo, Asante Akyem
- Michael Sarpong (born 1996), Ghanaian footballer
- Jeffrey Sarpong (born 1988), Ghanaian-Dutch professional footballer
- June Sarpong (born 1977), English television presenter
- Kweku Sarpong Plahar better known as Zigi (born 1988), Ghanaian singer
- Richmond Sarpong (born 1974), Ghanaian-American chemist
- Sam Sarpong (1979–2015), English-American actor and model
- Samuel Sarpong (1957–2025), Ghanaian politician
