= Lamine Bangura =

Sierra Leonean footballer (1964/1965 – 2024)

Personal information
- Date of birth: 1964/1965
- Date of death: 26 March 2024 (aged 59)
- Place of death: Freetown, Sierra Leone
- Position: Centre-back

Senior career*
| Years | Team | Apps | (Gls) |
| 1989–1990 | Diamond Stars | | |
| 1991–1993 | Real Republicans (Sierra Leone) | | |
| 1994 | Horoya AC | | |
| 1995 | AS Kaloum | | |
| 1996 | ASEC Mimosas | | |
| 1997–2000 | ES Sahel | | |

International career
| 1994–1998 | Sierra Leone | 7 | (0) |

Managerial career
- AS Kaloum
- Diamond Stars
- Central Parade
- Santoba
- 2021–: Ports Authority
- Sierra Leone U17
- Sierra Leone U20
- Sierra Leone U23
- * Club domestic league appearances and goals

Lamine Bangura (1964/1965 – 26 March 2024) was a Sierra Leonean football player and manager.

== Career ==
A centre-back, he made seven appearances for the Sierra Leone national team from 1994 to 1998. He was also named in Sierra Leone's squad for the 1996 African Cup of Nations tournament. At club level, Bangura played for Diamond Stars, Real Republicans (Sierra Leone), Guinean club AS Kaloum, Ivorian side ASEC Mimosas and Tunisian club ES Sahel. As a manager, he was in charge of AS Kaloum, Diamond Stars, Central Parade, Santoba, Ports Authority as well as the U17, U20 and U23 national teams of Sierra Leone.

== Death ==
He died in a traffic collision on 26 March 2024, at the age of 59.

== Honours ==
=== As a player ===
Horoya AC

- Guinée Championnat National: 1994
- Guinée Coupe Nationale: 1994

AS Kaloum

- Guinée Championnat National: 1995

=== As a manager ===
Diamond Stars

- Sierra Leone National Premier League: 2012, 2013
