= Santoba FC =

Guinean football club

- Full name: Santoba Football Club
- Ground: Stade de Coléah, Conakry
- Capacity: 5,000
- Manager: Lamin Bangura
- League: Guinée Championnat National
- 2013–14: 9th
Home colours

Santoba FC is an association football club from Guinea. The club competes in the Guinée Championnat National.
