= Eric Donkor =

Ghanaian professional footballer

Eric Akomanin Donkor (born 12 May 1992) is a Ghanaian former professional footballer who played as a Defender. He last played for Ghana Premier League side Ashanti Gold S.C. He is known for playing for both rivals Asante Kotoko and Ashanti Gold. He won the Ghana Premier League three times and the Ghana FA Cup twice during his time at Asante Kotoko.

== Career ==
Donkor played for Winneba-based team Windy Professionals before moving to Kumasi-based Asante Kotoko in 2011. He won the league title with Asante Kotoko on three consecutive periods, 2011–12, 2012–13 and 2012–13 seasons. He played for Kotoko from 2011 to 2018. In 2018, he joined Obuasi-based team Ashanti Gold on a two-year contract. He featured for the club in the 2019–20 CAF Confederation Cup. He left AshGold in 2020 after the expiration of his contract.
