= Never Tigere =

Zimbabwean footballer (born 1990)

Personal information
- Date of birth: 16 December 1990 (age 35)
- Place of birth: Harare, Zimbabwe
- Height: 1.71 m (5 ft 7 in)
- Position: Central midfielder

Team information
- Current team: Ngezi Platinum

Senior career*
Years	Team	Apps	(Gls)
2008	Hunters		
2009	DC Academy		
2010	Eagles		
2012	Catholic Saints		
2013	Monomotapa United		
2014	Mushowani Stars		
2015	Dongo Sawmills		
2016–2017	ZPC Kariba		
2018–2019	FC Platinum		
2019–2022	Azam		
2022–2024	Ihefu		
2024–	Ngezi Platinum		

International career^{‡}
2019–	Zimbabwe	6	(1)
- * Club domestic league appearances and goals as of 18:44, 9 January 2022 (UTC) ‡ National team caps and goals as of 21:53, 26 June 2024 (UTC)

Never Tigere (born 16 December 1990) is a Zimbabwean professional footballer who plays as a central midfielder for Ngezi Platinum and the Zimbabwe national team. He was named in Zimbabwe's squad for the 2021 Africa Cup of Nations.
