= Ziyo Tembo =

Zambian footballer (born 1985)

Personal information
- Date of birth: 30 June 1985 (age 41)
- Place of birth: Zambia
- Position: Center-back

Senior career*
Years	Team	Apps	(Gls)
2011–2018	Zanaco F.C.		
2018–2019	Al-Shoulla	30	(0)

International career^{‡}
2016–	Zambia	23	(0)
- * Club domestic league appearances and goals ‡ National team caps and goals as of 17 February 2019

Ziyo Tembo (born 30 June 1985) is a Zambian footballer who plays as a defender for the Zambia national football team.

== Club career ==
On 26 July 2018, Al-Shoulla has signed Tembo for one seasons from Zanaco F.C.
