= Sanele Barns =

South African soccer player (born 1997)

Personal information
- Date of birth: 2 April 1997 (age 29)
- Positions: Midfielder; winger

Team information
- Current team: Stellenbosch
- Number: 20

Senior career*
Years	Team	Apps	(Gls)
2018–2020	TS Galaxy	28	(1)
2018–2019	→ Casric Stars (loan)		
2020–2022	University of Pretoria	32	(6)
2022–2024	Richards Bay	57	(10)
2024–	Stellenbosch	36	(4)
- * Club domestic league appearances and goals as of 2025

Sanele Barns (born 2 April 1997) is a South African soccer player who plays as a midfielder for Premier Soccer League club Stellenbosch.

He hails from Tweefontein. He came into the system of TS Galaxy, and eventually made his Premier Division debut after the team owner bought a league licence, but also spent time on loan to Casric F.C. in the ABC Motsepe League. Upon returning to Galaxy, he supported their 2019–20 CAF Confederation Cup campaign. Then-manager Dan Malesela stated that Barns was "very coachable" and had "good technique". Nonetheless, Barns left Galaxy in 2020 for University of Pretoria, "AmaTuks".

Barns then joined Richards Bay in the summer of 2022. This would lead up to his first regular first-tier season in 2022-23. He recorded four goals and four assists.

He was subsequently named in the preliminary South Africa squad for the 2023 COSAFA Cup. The same summer, there were reports of Kaizer Chiefs wanting to sign him, as did Stellenbosch and Sekhukhune United.

== Personal life ==
Barns lost his mother in March 2023, incidentally on the same day as he lost his teammate Siphamandla Mtolo.
