= Isaac Mensah (footballer, born 1995) =

Ghanaian professional footballer

Personal information
- Date of birth: 13 December 1995 (age 30)
- Place of birth: Accra, Ghana
- Height: 1.65 m (5 ft 5 in)
- Position: Midfielder

Senior career*
Years	Team	Apps	(Gls)
2012–2017	Hearts of Oak	36	(0)
2017	Al Ittihad	12	(0)
2018–2022	Petro de Luanda	34	(0)
2023–2024	Great Olympics	14	(1)
2024–2025	Kabuscorp		
- * Club domestic league appearances and goals

Isaac Mensah (born 13 December 1995) is a Ghanaian professional footballer who plays as a midfielder.

== Career ==
Mensah began his career with Ghanaian club Accra Hearts of Oak. He played there from 2012 to 2017. He moved to Egypt and joined Al Ittihad Alexandria Club in August 2017. He left the club in December 2017 and returned to his former club Hearts of Oak. His second stint was from January 2018 to September 2018, of which he secured a deal to Angolan top club Atlético Petróleos de Luanda.
