= Godwin Zaki =

Nigerian football player

Personal information
- Full name: Godwin Iorbee Zaki
- Date of birth: 10 November 1994 (age 31)
- Place of birth: Benue State, Nigeria
- Position: Forward

Team information
- Current team: Enugu Rangers

Youth career
- 2009: Lobi Stars

Senior career*
Years	Team	Apps	(Gls)
- Sunshine Stars F.C.
2015–2016	Mqabba F.C.	2	
- Delta Force F.C.
2017	Abia Warriors F.C.	8	(3)
2018–	Enugu Rangers		
- * Club domestic league appearances and goals

Godwin Zaki (born 10 November 1994) is a Nigerian professional footballer, who plays as a forward.

== Club career ==
Godwin Zaki played for Enugu Rangers in the Nigeria Professional Football League. He previously played for clubs in Cyprus, Finland and Malta.

== Personal life ==
Godwin Zaki is the younger brother of John Zaki. He is known for his strength and physical presence with the ball.
