= Michael Sarpong =

Ghanaian professional footballer

Personal information
- Date of birth: 10 January 1996 (age 30)
- Place of birth: Ghana
- Height: 1.82 m (6 ft 0 in)
- Position: Forward

Team information
- Current team: Medeama

Youth career
- 2012–2014: Liberty Professionals

Senior career*
Years	Team	Apps	(Gls)
2015	Liberty Professionals		
2016–2018	Dreams		
2018–2020	Rayon Sport		
2020–2021	Young Africans		
2021–2022	Al-Nahda		
2024	Sekhukhune United	5	(0)
2024–	Medeama		
- * Club domestic league appearances and goals as of 12 October 2024

Michael Sarpong (born 10 January 1996) is a Ghanaian professional footballer who plays as a forward for Medeama.

He previously played for Ghanaian club Dreams, Rwandan team Rayon Sport and Tanzanian team Young Africans.

== Early life ==
Sarpong grew up in Mamprobi, a suburb of Accra in the Greater Accra Region of Ghana known for producing talented sportsmen including former Ghana national team captain Stephen Appiah, Peter Ofori-Quaye and former boxing world champion Azumah Nelson. He began playing football at an early age and played at the colts’ level Indafa Park. He joined Gaddafi FC began training with club. During that period he saw football as a hobby rather a future professional career. He dreamed of being an architect in future.

== Career ==
=== Dreams ===
Sarpong started his career playing for the youth side of Dansoman-based club Liberty Professionals. He later joined Ghana Premier League side Dreams FC. In the club's debut season in the Ghana Premier League, the 2016 Ghanaian Premier League he played 15 league matches and scored 4 goals to help the club finish in the 9th position. Unfortunately the club was demoted by the Ghana Football Association’s Disciplinary Committee to the Ghana Division One League in December 2016 due to an anomaly with the registration of a player. The following year, he played a key role in helping them to win the Division One League Zone II and return to the Ghana Premier League.

=== Rayon Sport ===
In October 2018, he secured a deal to Rwandan side Rayon Sport. In his debut season, the 2018–19 season, he scored 23 goals in all competitions with 16 league goals helping the club to secure their ninth Rwanda National Football League title. He also scored 6 goals in the Rwandan Cup. Due to his impressive performances with the season he finished the season as the club's top goal scorer and he was voted as the Rayon Sport best player of the season.

=== Young Africans ===
In August 2020, he was signed by Tanzanian club Young Africans on a free transfer after he mutually terminated his contract Rayon Sport in April. He reportedly signed a two-year $50,000 contract. The signing made him the second Ghanaian to join the club during the transfer window joining Moro Lamine. He scored his first goal on his competitive debut for Yanga in scoring the equalizer in a 1–1 draw against Tanzania Prisons SC on the opening week of the Tanzanian Premier League. After an initial goal drought in the first four matches of the league, he scored 2 goals in 8 matches by the end of November and was seen as the club's biggest attacking threat.

=== Al-Nahda ===
On 29 August 2021, Sarpong joined Al-Nahda on a free transfer, signing a one-year contract with Saudi Arabian club.

=== AS Kigali ===
In February 2022, Sarpong signed a three-month deal with Rwandan Premier League club AS Kigali. He scored two goals within his short-term contract whilst helping them to clinch the Rwandan Cup, known as the Peace Cup for the fourth time in the club's history. He was an unused substitute in the final though he became an important figure in the second round of the season for the Kigali-based club en route to the Peace Cup glory.

He was released by Sekhukhune United in the summer of 2024. In the fall of 2024 he returned to Ghana to join Medeama S.C. on a one-year contract.

== Personal life ==
Sarpong owns a foundation, named Michael Sarpong Foundation, which seeks to cater for needy especially orphans in Ghana. He idolises former French international Theirry Henry.

== Honours ==
Dreams

- Ghana Division One League Zone III: 2017
- GHALCA Top 8: 2018

Rayon Sport

- Rwanda Premier League: 2018–19

Young Africans

- Mapinduzi Cup: 2021

AS Kigali

- Rwandan Cup: 2022

Individual

- Rayon Sport Best player of the season: 2018–19
