= José Fidel Sipi =

Equatoguinean footballer (born 2001)

Personal information
- Full name: José Fidel Sipi Bitá
- Date of birth: 7 January 2001 (age 25)
- Height: 1.62 m (5 ft 4 in)
- Position: Midfielder

Team information
- Current team: MUZA
- Number: 21

Youth career
- 201?–20??: Cano Sport

Senior career*
Years	Team	Apps	(Gls)
201?–2022	Cano Sport		
2022–2023	Dinamo-Auto	22	(0)
2023	Cano Sport		
2024–	MUZA	1	(0)

International career^{‡}
2019	Equatorial Guinea U23	0+	(0)
2019–	Equatorial Guinea	4	(0)
- * Club domestic league appearances and goals as of 13 January 2024 ‡ National team caps and goals as of 20 October 2019

José Fidel Sipi Bitá (born 7 January 2001) is an Equatorial Guinean professional footballer who plays as a midfielder for Zambia Super League club MUZA and the Equatorial Guinea national team.

== International career ==
Sipi made his international debut for Equatorial Guinea on 28 July 2019.
