= Érick Sámano =

Mexican footballer (born 1991)

Personal information
- Full name: Érick Sámano Alemán
- Date of birth: 4 June 1991 (age 35)
- Place of birth: Mexico City, Mexico
- Position: Defender

Senior career*
Years	Team	Apps	(Gls)
2011	Guadalajara	0	(0)
2011–2012	Veracruz	8	(0)
2012–2013	U de. G	7	(0)
2013–2016	Atlético San Luis	23	(0)
2015–2016	→ Tepatitlán (loan)	6	(0)
2016–2019	La Piedad	35	(2)
2020	Atlético Capitalino	0	(0)
2023	9 de Octubre F.C.	0	(0)

International career
2019–2022	Mexico (beach)	0	(0)
- * Club domestic league appearances and goals as of 1 January 2019

Erick Sámano Alemán (born June 4, 1991), known as Erick Sámano, is a former Mexican professional footballer who played as a defender.

Sámano has played for Reboceros de La Piedad since 2016.
