= 2023 CAF Confederation Cup final =

International football match in Africa

TotalEnergies CAF Confederation Cup Final 2023
- Match programme cover
- Event: 2022–23 CAF Confederation Cup
| Young Africans | USM Alger |
| (Tanzania) | (Algeria) |
| 2 | 2 |
- on aggregate USM Alger won on away goals

First leg
| Young Africans | USM Alger |
| 1 | 2 |
- Date: 28 May 2023
- Venue: Benjamin Mkapa Stadium, Dar es Salaam
- Referee: Jean-Jacques Ndala (DR Congo)
- Attendance: 60,000
- Weather: Light rain showers 26 °C (79 °F); 87% humidity

Second leg
| USM Alger | Young Africans |
| 0 | 1 |
- Date: 3 June 2023
- Venue: Stade du 5 Juillet, Algiers
- Referee: Dahane Beida (Mauritania)
- Attendance: 64,000
- Weather: Light rain showers 19 °C (66 °F); 86% humidity

The 2023 CAF Confederation Cup final were the final matches of the 2022–23 CAF Confederation Cup, the 20th season of the CAF Confederation Cup and the 48th season overall of Africa's secondary club football competition organized by the Confederation of African Football (CAF).

The final was contested in two-legged home-and-away format between Young Africans from Tanzania and USM Alger from Algeria. The first leg was hosted by Young Africans at the National Stadium in Dar es Salaam on 28 May 2023, while the second leg was hosted by USM Alger at the Stade du 5 Juillet in Algiers on 3 June 2023.

USM Alger won against Young Africans by away goal rule, after a 2–2 draw, which the Algerian side scored twice away in the 2–1 win earlier.

== Background ==
Young Africans became the first Tanzanian club to reach the CAF Confederation Cup final and the second continental final for Tanzanian clubs, also the first club from CECAFA to reach a continental final since 1993 by Simba Sports Club in the CAF Cup.

USM Alger it is the second time has reached a continental final after the CAF Champions League final in 2015 against TP Mazembe where they was defeated. This was the fourth CAF Confederation Cup final for the algerian club after ES Sétif, MO Béjaïa and JS Kabylie who were all defeated. USM Alger is looking for the first continental title, especially since the second leg is played in Algeria.

=== Previous finals ===
| Team | Zone | Previous finals appearances (bold indicates winners) |
|---|---|---|
| (Tanzania) Young Africans | CECAFA (East Africa) | none |
| (Algeria) USM Alger | UNAF (North Africa) | none |

== Venues ==
After playing the final in the last three copies in a neutral land, the return was made to the previous home and away system and the first leg in Dar es Salaam will be played at Benjamin Mkapa Stadium on May 28. It opened in 2007 and was built adjacent to Uhuru Stadium, the former national stadium. It hosts major football matches such as the Tanzanian Premier League and home matches of the Tanzania national football team, the second leg at Stade du 5 Juillet in Algiers on June 3 where the winners will lift the trophy. It opened in 1972 and served as the main stadium of the 1975 Mediterranean Games, the 1978 All-Africa Games, the 2004 Pan Arab Games, and the 2007 All-Africa Games. The stadium was one of two venues of the 1990 African Cup of Nations (the other venue was the 19 May 1956 Stadium in Annaba).

Benjamin Mkapa Stadium in Dar es Salaam, Tanzania hosted the first leg.

Stade du 5 Juillet in Algiers, Algeria hosted the second leg.

== Road to the final ==
Note: In all results below, the score of the finalist is given first (H: home; A: away).

| (Tanzania) Young Africans | | | | Round | (Algeria) USM Alger | | | |
|---|---|---|---|---|---|---|---|---|
| **CAF Champions League** | | | | | **CAF Confederation Cup** | | | |
| Opponent | Agg. | 1st leg | 2nd leg | Qualifying rounds (CL, CC) | Opponent | Agg. | 1st leg | 2nd leg |
| (South Sudan) Zalan | 9–0 | 4–0 (A) | 5–0 (H) | First round | Bye | | | |
| (Sudan) Al Hilal | 1–2 | 1–1 (H) | 0–1 (A) | Second round | (Togo) ASC Kara | 4–1 | 2–0 (A) | 2–1 (H) |
| **CAF Confederation Cup** | | | | | | | | |
| (Tunisia) Club Africain | 1–0 | 0–0 (H) | 1–0 (A) | Playoff round | (South Africa) Cape Town City | 1–0 | 0–0 (A) | 1–0 (H) |
| Opponent | Result | | | Group stage | Opponent | Result | | |
| (Tunisia) Union Monatirienne | 0–2 (A) | | | Matchday 1 | (Democratic Republic of the Congo) Saint-Éloi Lupopo | 3–0 (H) | | |
| (Democratic Republic of the Congo) TP Mazembe | 3–1 (H) | | | Matchday 2 | (Libya) Al Akhdar | 1–1 (A) | | |
| (Mali) Real Bamako | 1–1 (A) | | | Matchday 3 | (South Africa) Marumo Gallants | 2–0 (H) | | |
| (Mali) Real Bamako | 2–0 (H) | | | Matchday 4 | (South Africa) Marumo Gallants | 0–2 (A) | | |
| (Tunisia) Union Monatirienne | 2–0 (H) | | | Matchday 5 | (Democratic Republic of the Congo) Saint-Éloi Lupopo | 1–1 (A) | | |
| (Democratic Republic of the Congo) TP Mazembe | 1–0 (A) | | | Matchday 6 | (Libya) Al Akhdar | 4–1 (H) | | |
| **Group D winners**: Pos / Team / Pld / Pts; **1** / (Tanzania) Young Africans / **6** / **13**; 2 / (Tunisia) US Monastir / 6 / **13**; 3 / (Mali) Real Bamako / 6 / **5**; 4 / (Democratic Republic of the Congo) TP Mazembe / 6 / **3**; Source: CAF | | | | Final standings | **Group A runners-up**: Pos / Team / Pld / Pts; 1 / (South Africa) Marumo Gallants / 6 / **12**; **2** / (Algeria) USM Alger / **6** / **11**; 3 / (Democratic Republic of the Congo) Saint-Éloi Lupopo / 6 / **5**; 4 / (Libya) Al Akhdar / 6 / **5**; Source: CAF | | | |
| Opponent | Agg. | 1st leg | 2nd leg | Knockout stage | Opponent | Agg. | 1st leg | 2nd leg |
| (Nigeria) Rivers United | 2–0 | 2–0 (A) | 0–0 (H) | Quarter-finals | (Morocco) ASFAR | 4–3 | 2–0 (H) | 2–3 (A) |
| (South Africa) Marumo Gallants | 4–1 | 2–0 (H) | 2–1 (A) | Semi-finals | (Ivory Coast) ASEC Mimosas | 2–0 | 0–0 (A) | 2–0 (H) |

== Format ==
The final was played on a home-and-away two-legged basis.

If the aggregate score was tied after the second leg, the away goals rule was applied, and if still equal, extra time was played, and a penalty shoot-out was used to determine the winner.

== Matches ==
=== First leg ===
==== Details ====
28 May 2023
16:00 UTC+3

| Young Africans (Tanzania) | 1–2 | (Algeria) USM Alger |
|---|---|---|
| Mayele 82' | Report | Mahious 32'; Merili 84' |

Benjamin Mkapa Stadium, Dar es Salaam
Attendance: 60,000
Referee: Jean-Jacques Ndala (DR Congo)

| **Young Africans** | **USM Alger** |

| GK | 39 | (Mali) Djigui Diarra |
| DF | 4 | (Democratic Republic of the Congo) Yannick Bangala Litombo |
| DF | 5 | (Tanzania) Dickson Job | (yellow card) 30' | (substituted off) 76' |
| DF | 3 | (Tanzania) Bakari Mwamnyeto (c) |
| DF | 15 | (Tanzania) Kibwana Shomari | | (substituted off) 76' |
| DF | 2 | (Tanzania) Ibrahim Abdallah Hamad |
| MF | 27 | (Tanzania) Mudathir Yahya |
| FW | 10 | (Burkina Faso) Stephane Aziz Ki | | (substituted off) 66' |
| FW | 25 | (Zambia) Kennedy Musonda | | (substituted off) 86' |
| FW | 29 | (Democratic Republic of the Congo) Tuisila Kisinda | | (substituted off) 76' |
| FW | 9 | (Democratic Republic of the Congo) Fiston Mayele |
Substitutes:
| GK | 1 | (Tanzania) Metacha Mnata |
| DF | 13 | (Democratic Republic of the Congo) Joyce Lomalisa | | (substituted on) 76' |
| DF | 21 | (Democratic Republic of the Congo) Djuma Shabani | | (substituted on) 76' |
| MF | 12 | (Democratic Republic of the Congo) Jesus Ducapel Moloko |
| MF | 17 | (Tanzania) Faridi Mussa |
| MF | 18 | (Tanzania) Salum Abubakar | | (substituted on) 66' |
| MF | 20 | (Tanzania) Zawadi Mauya |
| FW | 33 | (Ghana) Bernard Morrison | | (substituted on) 76' |
| FW | 40 | (Tanzania) Clement Franses Mzize | | (substituted on) 86' |
Head Coach:
(Tunisia) Nasreddine Nabi

| GK | 25 | (Algeria) Oussama Benbot | (yellow card) 90' |
| RB | 19 | (Algeria) Saâdi Radouani |
| LB | 12 | (Algeria) Haithem Loucif |
| CB | 4 | (Algeria) Zineddine Belaïd (c) |
| CB | 21 | (Algeria) Adam Alilet | (yellow card) 60' |
| DM | 6 | (Algeria) Oussama Chita | (yellow card) 49' |
| DM | 14 | (Algeria) Brahim Benzaza | (yellow card) 80' | (substituted off) 86' |
| AM | 8 | (Algeria) Islam Merili | | (substituted off) 90+8' |
| RW | 23 | (Algeria) Khaled Bousseliou | | (substituted off) 86' |
| LW | 31 | (Botswana) Tumisang Orebonye | | (substituted off) 90+8' |
| ST | 18 | (Algeria) Aymen Mahious | | (substituted off) 71' |
Substitutes:
| GK | 16 | (Algeria) Imad Benchlef |
| RB | 3 | (Algeria) Abdelkader Belharrane |
| CB | 27 | (Algeria) Ibrahim Bekakchi |
| DM | 15 | (Algeria) Messala Merbah | | (substituted on) 86' |
| DM | 24 | (Algeria) Taher Benkhelifa | | (substituted on) 90+8' |
| AM | 26 | (Algeria) Akram Djahnit | | (substituted on) 90+8' |
| ST | 7 | (Algeria) Ismail Belkacemi | | (substituted on) 86' |
| LW | 10 | (Algeria) Abderrahmane Meziane | | (substituted on) 71' |
| RW | 20 | (Libya) Zakaria Alharaish |
Manager:
(Algeria) Abdelhak Benchikha

Assistant referees:
Zakhele Siwela (South Africa)
Olivier Safari Kabene (DR Congo)
Fourth official:
Ahmad Imtehaz Heeralall (Mauritius)
Video assistant referee:
Peter Waweru (Kenya)
Assistant video assistant referees:
Akuna Maklama (South Africa)
Mohammed Abdallah Ibrahim (Sudan)

**Match rules**
- 90 minutes.
- Nine named substitutes, of which up to five may be used. (Note: Each team was only given three opportunities to make substitutions, excluding substitutions made at half-time.)

==== Statistics ====
First half
| Statistic | Young Africans | USM Alger |
|---|---|---|
| Goals scored | 0 | 1 |
| Total shots | 0 | 0 |
| Shots on target | 0 | 0 |
| Saves | 0 | 0 |
| Ball possession | 60% | 40% |
| Corner kicks | 0 | 0 |
| Offsides | 0 | 0 |
| Yellow cards | 1 | 0 |
| Red cards | 0 | 0 |

Second half
| Statistic | Young Africans | USM Alger |
|---|---|---|
| Goals scored | 1 | 1 |
| Total shots | 0 | 0 |
| Shots on target | 0 | 0 |
| Saves | 0 | 0 |
| Ball possession | 70% | 30% |
| Corner kicks | 0 | 0 |
| Offsides | 0 | 0 |
| Yellow cards | 0 | 4 |
| Red cards | 0 | 0 |

Overall
| Statistic | Young Africans | USM Alger |
|---|---|---|
| Goals scored | 1 | 2 |
| Total shots | 15 | 11 |
| Shots on target | 4 | 6 |
| Saves | 0 | 0 |
| Ball possession | 65% | 35% |
| Corner kicks | 9 | 5 |
| Offsides | 1 | 0 |
| Yellow cards | 1 | 4 |
| Red cards | 0 | 0 |

=== Second leg ===
==== Details ====
3 June 2023
20:00 UTC+1

| USM Alger (Algeria) | 0–1 | (Tanzania) Young Africans |
|---|---|---|
| | Report | Shabani 7' (pen.) |

Stade du 5 Juillet, Algiers
Attendance: 64,000
Referee: Dahane Beida (Mauritania)

| **USM Alger** | **Young Africans** |

| GK | 25 | (Algeria) Oussama Benbot |
| RB | 19 | (Algeria) Saâdi Radouani |
| LB | 12 | (Algeria) Haithem Loucif |
| CB | 4 | (Algeria) Zineddine Belaïd (c) |
| CB | 21 | (Algeria) Adam Alilet |
| DM | 6 | (Algeria) Oussama Chita |
| DM | 15 | (Algeria) Messala Merbah | | (substituted off) 45' |
| AM | 8 | (Algeria) Islam Merili |
| RW | 23 | (Algeria) Khaled Bousseliou | | (substituted off) 74' |
| LW | 31 | (Botswana) Tumisang Orebonye | (yellow card) 78' |
| ST | 18 | (Algeria) Aymen Mahious | (yellow card) 5' | (substituted off) 90+5' |
Substitutes:
| GK | 16 | (Algeria) Imad Benchlef |
| RB | 3 | (Algeria) Abdelkader Belharrane |
| CB | 5 | (Algeria) Mustapha Bouchina |
| CB | 27 | (Algeria) Ibrahim Bekakchi |
| DM | 24 | (Algeria) Taher Benkhelifa | | (substituted on) 90+5' |
| AM | 26 | (Algeria) Akram Djahnit |
| ST | 7 | (Algeria) Ismail Belkacemi | | (substituted on) 74' |
| LW | 10 | (Algeria) Abderrahmane Meziane | | (substituted on) 45' |
| RW | 20 | (Libya) Zakaria Alharaish |
Manager:
(Algeria) Abdelhak Benchikha

| GK | 39 | (Mali) Djigui Diarra |
| DF | 21 | (Democratic Republic of the Congo) Djuma Shabani | | (substituted off) 83' |
| DF | 2 | (Tanzania) Ibrahim Abdallah Hamad |
| DF | 3 | (Tanzania) Bakari Mwamnyeto (c) | (yellow card) 67' |
| DF | 5 | (Tanzania) Dickson Job |
| MF | 27 | (Tanzania) Mudathir Yahya | (yellow card) 74' | (substituted off) 84' |
| MF | 18 | (Tanzania) Salum Abubakar |
| MF | 29 | (Democratic Republic of the Congo) Tuisila Kisinda | | (substituted off) 62' |
| MF | 13 | (Democratic Republic of the Congo) Joyce Lomalisa | (yellow card) 15' | (substituted off) 84' |
| FW | 9 | (Democratic Republic of the Congo) Fiston Mayele |
| FW | 25 | (Zambia) Kennedy Musonda | | (substituted off) 72' |
Substitutes:
| GK | 1 | (Tanzania) Metacha Mnata |
| DF | 4 | (Democratic Republic of the Congo) Yannick Bangala Litombo |
| DF | 15 | (Tanzania) Kibwana Shomari |
| MF | 12 | (Democratic Republic of the Congo) Jesus Ducapel Moloko | | (substituted on) 83' |
| MF | 17 | (Tanzania) Faridi Mussa | | (substituted on) 84' |
| MF | 20 | (Tanzania) Zawadi Mauya |
| FW | 10 | (Burkina Faso) Stephane Aziz Ki | | (substituted on) 72' |
| FW | 33 | (Ghana) Bernard Morrison | (yellow card) 90' | (substituted on) 62' |
| FW | 40 | (Tanzania) Clement Franses Mzize | | (substituted on) 84' |
Head Coach:
(Tunisia) Nasreddine Nabi

Assistant referees:
Jerson Emiliano dos Santos (Angola)
Arsénio Chadreque Marengula (Mozambique)
Fourth official:
Mahmood Ismail (Sudan)
Video assistant referee:
Mahmoud Mohamed Ashour (Egypt)
Assistant video assistant referees:
Mohamed Adel (Egypt)
Mahmoud Abo El Regal (Egypt)

**Match rules**
- 90 minutes.
- Penalty shoot-out if tied on aggregate and away goals.
- Nine named substitutes, of which up to five may be used.

==== Statistics ====
First half
| Statistic | USM Alger | Young Africans |
|---|---|---|
| Goals scored | 0 | 1 |
| Total shots | 7 | 3 |
| Shots on target | 3 | 1 |
| Saves | 0 | 3 |
| Ball possession | 43% | 57% |
| Corner kicks | 1 | 0 |
| Offsides | 0 | 2 |
| Yellow cards | 1 | 1 |
| Red cards | 0 | 0 |

Second half
| Statistic | USM Alger | Young Africans |
|---|---|---|
| Goals scored | 0 | 0 |
| Total shots | 9 | 4 |
| Shots on target | 2 | 2 |
| Saves | 2 | 2 |
| Ball possession | 49% | 51% |
| Corner kicks | 1 | 2 |
| Offsides | 0 | 0 |
| Yellow cards | 1 | 3 |
| Red cards | 0 | 0 |

Overall
| Statistic | USM Alger | Young Africans |
|---|---|---|
| Goals scored | 0 | 1 |
| Total shots | 16 | 7 |
| Shots on target | 5 | 3 |
| Saves | 2 | 5 |
| Ball possession | 46% | 54% |
| Corner kicks | 2 | 2 |
| Offsides | 0 | 2 |
| Yellow cards | 2 | 4 |
| Red cards | 0 | 0 |

== See also ==
- 2023 CAF Champions League Final
- 2023 CAF Super Cup
