= 2022–23 Future FC season =

Future FC
2022–23 season
- Chairman: Walid Zaki
- Head coach: Ali Maher
- Stadium: Al Salam Stadium
- Egyptian Premier League: 4th
- Egypt Cup: Round of 16
- EFA Cup: Semi-finals
- CAF Confederation Cup: Group stage
- Top goalscorer: League: Marwan Mohsen (6); All: Marwan Mohsen (11)

The 2022–23 Future FC season was the club's 12th season in existence and the second consecutive season in the topflight of Egyptian football. In addition to the domestic league, Future participated in this season's editions of the Egypt Cup, the EFA Cup and the CAF Confederation Cup.

== Players ==
=== First-team squad ===
As of 3 October 2022

Note: Flags indicate national team as defined under FIFA eligibility rules; some limited exceptions apply. Players may hold more than one non-FIFA nationality.

No.	Pos.	Nation	Player
1	GK	EGY	Mahmoud Hamdy
2	DF	EGY	Soliman Khaled
4	DF	EGY	Mahmoud Rizk
5	DF	EGY	Mahmoud Marei
7	MF	EGY	Mohamed Farouk
8	MF	EGY	Nasser Maher
9	FW	EGY	Marwan Mohsen
11	DF	EGY	Tarek Taha
12	MF	EGY	Ashraf Magdy
13	DF	CMR	Joseph Ngwem
14	MF	EGY	Ahmed Refaat
15	FW	TUN	Aymen Sfaxi
16	GK	EGY	Mahmoud Genesh (Vice-captain)
17	MF	EGY	Karim Nedved (on loan from Al Ahly)
19	FW	EGY	Mostafa El Badry (on loan from Al Ahly)

No.	Pos.	Nation	Player
20	DF	EGY	Saad Samir (on loan from Al Ahly)(captain)
21	DF	EGY	Mahmoud Shaaban
22	MF	EGY	Omar Saviola
24	MF	EGY	Mohamed Reda
25	GK	EGY	Mohamed Tarek
26	DF	EGY	Mohamed Rabia
27	MF	EGY	Ghanam Mohamed
28	FW	SEN	Aliou Naday
29	DF	EGY	Omar Kamal
30	FW	EGY	Ahmed Atef
—	DF	EGY	Ali Elfil
—	MF	EGY	Mohanad Lasheen
—	FW	GUI	Hadji Barry
—	FW	MAR	Abdelkabir El Ouadi

== Transfers ==
=== In ===
No.	Pos	Player	Transferred from	Fee	Date	Source
12	MF	(France) Abdallah Yaisien	(Egypt) Al Mokawloon Al Arab	Free	21 September 2022	
	MF	(Egypt) Hesham Balaha	(Egypt) Ghazl El Mahalla	LE 8,000,000	27 September 2022	
3	FW	(Guinea) Hadji Barry	(United States) Colorado Springs Switchbacks	Undisclosed	3 October 2022	

=== Out ===
No.	Pos	Player	Transferred to	Fee	Date	Source
	FW	(Palestine) Saleh Chihadeh	(Switzerland) FC Naters	Free	21 July 2022	
	MF	(Madagascar) Anicet Abel	(Bulgaria) Beroe Stara Zagora	Free	5 August 2022	
	MF	(Egypt) Ahmed Refaat	(United Arab Emirates) Al Wahda	Loan	28 September 2022	

== Pre-season and friendlies ==
Win Draw Loss Fixtures

27 September 2022 Friendly	Future (Egypt)	1–0	(Egypt) El Minya	Cairo
	Sfaxi

3 October 2022 Friendly	Future (Egypt)	3–0	(Egypt) Cascada	Cairo
16:00				Stadium: Cairo International Stadium

== Competitions ==
=== Overview ===
Competition	First match	Last match	Starting round	Final position	Record							
Competition	First match	Last match	Starting round	Final position	Pld	W	D	L	GF	GA	GD	Win %
Egyptian Premier League	20 October 2022	14 July 2023	Matchday 1	4th	34	15	13	6	34	23	+11	44.12
Egypt Cup	10 May 2023	28 May 2023	Round of 32	Round of 16	2	1	1	0	5	2	+3	50.00
EFA Cup	25 March 2023	24 June 2023	Round of 16	Semi-finals	3	1	2	0	1	0	+1	33.33
CAF Confederation Cup	10 September 2022	2 April 2023	First round	Group stage	12	4	4	4	13	14	−1	33.33
Total					51	21	20	10	53	39	+14	41.18

Source: Soccerway

=== Egyptian Premier League ===
==== League table ====
Pos	Team	Pld	W	D	L	GF	GA	GD	Pts	Qualification or relegation
2	Pyramids	34	22	7	5	58	24	+34	73	Qualification for the Champions League second round
3	Zamalek	34	17	9	8	52	36	+16	60	Qualification for the Confederation Cup second round (Note: Since the 2022–23 Egypt Cup wouldn't finish by the CAF deadline for associations to submit teams participating in next season's African competitions, the spot awarded to the Egypt Cup winners (Confederation Cup first or second round) was passed to the fourth-placed team in the league.)
4	Future	34	15	13	6	34	23	+11	58	Qualification for the Confederation Cup second round
5	Al Masry	34	11	15	8	34	33	+1	48	
6	ENPPI	34	13	6	15	34	40	−6	45	

Source: Soccerway
Rules for classification: 1) Points; 2) Head-to-head points; 3) Head-to-head goal difference; 4) Goal difference; 5) Goals scored; 6) Play-off.

==== Results summary ====
Overall								Home						Away					
Pld	W	D	L	GF	GA	GD	Pts	W	D	L	GF	GA	GD	W	D	L	GF	GA	GD
34	15	13	6	34	23	+11	58	7	8	2	15	8	+7	8	5	4	19	15	+4

Source: worldfootball

==== Results by round ====
Round	1	2	3	4	5	6	7	8	9	10	11	12	13	14	15	16	17	18	19	20	21	22	23	24	25	26	27	28	29	30	31	32	33	34
Ground	A	H	A	H	A	H	A	H	H	A	H	A	H	A	H	A	H	H	A	H	A	H	A	H	A	A	H	A	H	A	H	A	H	A
Result	W	D	D	W	W	W	D	W	D	W	D	W	D	W	D	L	W	W	D	D	W	L	W	D	W	D	D	D	W	L	W	L	L	L
Position	2	4	6	5	4	3	4	3	3	3	3	2	2	2	2	3	3	3	3	3	2		2											

Source: worldfootball
A = Away; H = Home; W = Win; D = Draw; L = Loss

==== Matches ====
The league fixtures were announced on 9 October 2022.

20 October 2022 1	Haras El Hodoud	0–2	Future	Alexandria
17:00 EST (UTC+2)		Report	El Said 75'; Barry 87'	Stadium: Haras El Hodoud Stadium; Referee: Mohamed El Hanafi

24 October 2022 2	Future	0–0	Al Mokawloon Al Arab	Cairo
19:00 EST (UTC+2)		Report		Stadium: Al Salam Stadium; Referee: Mohammad Sabahi

23 November 2022 4	Future	2–1	Aswan	Cairo
17:00 EST (UTC+2)	Atef 47'; Lasheen 90+3' (pen.)	Report	Belhadji 44' (pen.)	Stadium: Al Salam Stadium; Referee: Mahmoud Nagi

1 December 2022 5	El Dakhleya	0–1	Future	Cairo
14:45 EST (UTC+2)		Report	Ngwem 87'	Stadium: Petro Sport Stadium; Referee: Mohammed Yousef

8 December 2022 6	Future	1–0	Al Ittihad	Cairo
17:00 EST (UTC+2)	El Ouadi 25'	Report		Stadium: Al Salam Stadium; Referee: Mohamed Maarouf

12 December 2022 3	Ismaily	0–0	Future	Ismailia
17:00 EST (UTC+2)		Report		Stadium: Ismailia Stadium; Referee: Sobhy El Amrawi

16 December 2022 7	Al Ahly	1–1	Future	Cairo
19:00 EST (UTC+2)	El Shahat 32'; Afsha (penalty missed) 90+5'	Report	El Ouadi 79'	Stadium: Al Ahly WE Al Salam Stadium; Referee: Amin Omar

19 December 2022 8	Future	1–0	Ghazl El Mahalla	Cairo
17:00 EST (UTC+2)	Ali 18'	Report		Stadium: Al Salam Stadium; Referee: Mahmoud El Banna

24 December 2022 9	Future	0–0	Tala'ea El Gaish	Cairo
19:00 EST (UTC+2)	El Said (yellow card) 41'; Marei (yellow card) 49'; Zaazaa (yellow card) 90'	Report	El Zahdi (yellow card) 45+2'; Osama (yellow card) 47'; Diab (yellow card) 69'; Abdel Rahman (yellow card) 90+4'	Stadium: Al Salam Stadium; Referee: Nader Kamar

28 December 2022 10	Pharco	2–3	Future	Alexandria
17:00 EST (UTC+2)	Abdulaziz (yellow card) 32'; Kamel 45+1'; Bakri (yellow card) 82'; Hamroune 87' (pen.)	Report	Mohsen 2'; Kamal 50', 59'; Mohamed (yellow card) 54'; Abdel Rahim (yellow card) 67'; Lasheen (yellow card) 90+5'	Stadium: Alexandria Stadium; Referee: Ahmed El Ghandour

3 January 2023 11	Future	1–1	Smouha	Cairo
20:00 EST (UTC+2)	Mohsen 18'; Ngwem (yellow card) 60'; Yaisien (yellow card) 82'	Report	Faisal 7'; Boateng (yellow card) 55'; Gamal (yellow card) 68'; Hakam (yellow card) 90+6'	Stadium: Al Salam Stadium; Referee: Wael Farhan

7 January 2023 12	Ceramica Cleopatra	2–3	Future	Cairo
19:00 EST (UTC+2)	Gaber 1'; Rayan (yellow card) 5'; Ramadan (yellow card) 22'; Ebuka 45+2'; Ramadan (yellow card) 74'	Report	Ngwem 27'; Lasheen (yellow card) 37'; Reda 46'; Rizk (yellow card) 61'; Kamal 65'; Samir (yellow card) 74'; Mohsen (yellow card) 81'	Stadium: Cairo International Stadium; Referee: Tarek Magdy

11 January 2023 13	Future	1–1	Pyramids	Cairo
19:00 EST (UTC+2)	Mohsen (penalty missed) 12'; Reda 21' (pen.); Rizk (yellow card) 38'; Hafez (yellow card) 90+5'	Report	Adel (yellow card) 40', (goal) 80'; Lakay (yellow card) 52'; Said (yellow card) 90+4' (yellow-red card) 90+4'; El Shenawy (yellow card) 90+5'	Stadium: Al Salam Stadium; Referee: Mohamed Maarouf

18 January 2023 14	ENPPI	2–3	Future	Cairo
19:00 EST (UTC+2)	Dowidar 37'; El Tayeeb (yellow card) 44'; Fawzi 60' (pen.); Eid (yellow card) 90'; Reda (yellow card) 90+5'	Report	Reda 50' (pen.); El Ouadi 60'; Rizk (yellow card) 70'; Shaaban (yellow card) 73'; El Said 90+4'	Stadium: Petrosport Stadium; Referee: Mohamed Maarouf

24 January 2023 15	Future	1–1	Al Masry	Cairo
14:45 EST (UTC+2)	Reda 49'	Report	Eze (yellow card) 42'; Hamdi 61'; El Gazzar (yellow card) 64'	Stadium: Al Salam Stadium; Referee: Hesham El Flal

29 January 2023 16	Zamalek	2–1	Future	Cairo
19:00 EST (UTC+2)	Jaziri 14', 34'	Report	Ali (yellow card) 20'; Mohsen 24'; Lasheen (yellow card) 48'	Stadium: Cairo International Stadium; Referee: Mahmoud El Banna

7 February 2023 17	Future	3–0	National Bank	Cairo
19:00 EST (UTC+2)	Ali 23'; Mohsen 45' (pen.); Farouk 79'	Report		Stadium: Al Salam Stadium; Referee: Mohamed El Hanafi

16 February 2023 18	Future	1–0	Haras El Hodoud	Cairo
17:00 EST (UTC+2)	El Saadani 84' (o.g.)	Report		Stadium: Al Salam Stadium; Referee: Wael Farhan

22 February 2023 19	Al Mokawloon Al Arab	0–0	Future	Cairo
17:00 EST (UTC+2)		Report	Reda (penalty missed) 80'	Stadium: Osman Ahmed Osman Stadium; Referee: Tarek Magdy

3 March 2023 20	Future	0–0	Ismaily	Cairo
17:00 EST (UTC+2)		Report		Stadium: Al Salam Stadium; Referee: Mohammad Sabahi

12 March 2023 21	Aswan	1–2	Future	Aswan
15:00 EST (UTC+2)	Evouna 79'	Report	Walid 7'; Zaazaa 78'	Stadium: Aswan Stadium; Referee: Sayed Shabaan

6 April 2023 23	Al Ittihad	0–1	Future	Alexandria
21:15 EST (UTC+2)		Report	Mohsen 64'	Stadium: Alexandria Stadium; Referee: Mabrouk Nabil

12 April 2023 25	Ghazl El Mahalla	0–1	Future	El Mahalla El Kubra
21:15 EST (UTC+2)		Report	Mohamed 57'	Stadium: Ghazl El Mahalla Stadium; Referee: Ibrahim Adel

19 April 2023 26	Tala'ea El Gaish	0–0	Future	Cairo
21:15 EST (UTC+2)		Report		Stadium: Gehaz El Reyada Stadium; Referee: Mahmoud Nagi

25 April 2023 22	Future	0–1	El Dakhleya	Cairo
20:30 EST (UTC+2)		Report	Kyambadde 89'	Stadium: Al Salam Stadium; Referee: Tarek Magdy

4 May 2023 27	Future	0–0	Pharco	Cairo
21:30 EST (UTC+3)		Report		Stadium: Al Salam Stadium; Referee: Hisham Al-Falal
Note: The game, which was initially slated for 26 April 2023, was postponed.

16 May 2023 28	Smouha	1–1	Future	Alexandria
19:00 EST (UTC+3)	Ali 43' (o.g.)	Report	Mohsen 32' (pen.)	Stadium: Alexandria Stadium; Referee: Abdelaziz El Sayed

24 May 2023 29	Future	1–0	Ceramica Cleopatra	Cairo
21:30 EST (UTC+2)	Atef 59'	Report		Stadium: Al Salam Stadium; Referee: Wael Farhan

2 June 2023 30	Pyramids	1–0	Future	Cairo
21:30 EST (UTC+3)	Fathi 66'	Report		Stadium: 30 June Stadium; Referee: Tarek Magdy

6 June 2023 31	Future	v	ENPPI	Cairo
21:30 EST (UTC+3)				Stadium: Al Salam Stadium

2 July 2023 24	Future	v	Al Ahly	Cairo
20:30 EST (UTC+2)				Stadium: Al Salam Stadium
Note: The game, which was initially slated for 9 April 2023, was postponed.

=== Egypt Cup ===
10 May 2023 Round of 32	Future	4–1	Tala'ea El Ustoul	Cairo
21:00 EST (UTC+2)	Mohsen 1', 5', 37' (pen.); Sfaxi 55'		Atito 70'	Stadium: Al Salam Stadium

28 May 2023 Round of 16	ENPPI	1–1 (a.e.t.) (6–5 p)	Future	Cairo
21:30 EST (UTC+3)				Stadium: Petrosport Stadium

=== EFA Cup ===
25 March 2023 Round of 16	Future	0–0 (3–1 p)	Tala'ea El Gaish	Cairo
21:15 EST (UTC+2)				Stadium: Petrosport Stadium

30 April 2023 Quarter-finals	Haras El Hodoud	0–1	Future	Cairo
21:00 EST (UTC+2)			El Kadi 10' (o.g.)	Stadium: Cairo International Stadium

=== CAF Confederation Cup ===
==== Qualifying rounds ====
The draw for the qualifying rounds was held on 9 August 2022.

===== First round =====
10 September 2022 First leg	Bul (Uganda)	0–0	(Egypt) Future	Entebbe, Uganda
16:00 UTC+3		Report		Stadium: St. Mary's Stadium-Kitende; Referee: Elsiddig Eltreefe (Sudan)

17 September 2022 Second leg	Future (Egypt)	1–0 (1–0 agg.)	(Uganda) Bul	Cairo, Egypt
21:00 UTC+2	Ngwem 77'	Report		Stadium: Cairo International Stadium; Referee: Mehrez Malki (Tunisia)

===== Second round =====
9 October 2022 First leg	Kallon (Sierra Leone)	0–2	(Egypt) Future	Monrovia, Liberia
16:00 UTC+0		Report	Mohsen 48'; El Badry 90'	Stadium: SKD Stadium; Referee: Boubou Traoré (Mali)

16 October 2022 Second leg	Future (Egypt)	4–0 (6–0 agg.)	(Sierra Leone) Kallon	Cairo, Egypt
19:00 UTC+2	Sfaxi 12', 60'; Samir 68'; Maher 79'	Report		Stadium: Cairo International Stadium; Referee: Mustapha Ghorbal (Algeria)

===== Play-off round =====
2 November 2022 First leg	1º de Agosto (Angola)	1–1	(Egypt) Future	Luanda, Angola
16:00 UTC+1	Mawiya 90+3'	Report	Sfaxi 11'	Stadium: Estádio 11 de Novembro; Referee: Daouda Guèye (Senegal)

9 November 2022 Second leg	Future (Egypt)	1–1 (2–2 agg.) (3–2 p)	(Angola) 1º de Agosto	Cairo, Egypt
18:00 UTC+2	Kamal 90+2'		Tshibamba 44'	Stadium: Al Salam Stadium; Referee: Kalilou Traore (Ivory Coast)
	Penalties
	Marei (penalty missed); Kamal (penalty scored); Mohsen (penalty scored); Mohamed (penalty missed); Samir (penalty scored)		(penalty scored) Tshibamba; (penalty missed) Bonifácio; (penalty missed) Venancio; (penalty scored) Keliano; (penalty missed) Herenilson

==== Group stage ====
The draw for the group stage was held on 12 December 2022.

Pos	Team	Pld	W	D	L	GF	GA	GD	Pts	Qualification	FAR	PFC	ASK	FUT
1	(Morocco) ASFAR	6	4	2	0	14	4	+10	14	Advance to knockout stage	—	1–0	5–1	2–0
2	(Egypt) Pyramids	6	3	2	1	11	5	+6	11	Advance to knockout stage	2–2	—	1–0	3–0 (Note: Awarded)
3	(Togo) ASKO Kara	6	1	1	4	6	14	−8	4 (Note: Head-to-head points: ASKO Kara 3, Future 3. Head-to-head goal difference: ASKO Kara 0, Future 0. Head-to-head goals scored: ASKO Kara 3, Future 3. Head-to-head away goals scored: ASKO Kara 3, Future 3. Goal difference: ASKO Kara -8, Future -8. Goals scored: ASKO Kara 6, Future 4)		1–1	1–4	—	0–3 (Note: Awarded)
4	(Egypt) Future	6	1	1	4	4	12	−8	4		0–3 (Note: Awarded)	1–1	0–3 (Note: Awarded)	—

Source: CAF
Rules for classification: Group stage tiebreakers
Notes:

12 February 2023 1	ASKO Kara (Togo)	0–3; Awarded	(Egypt) Future	Lomé, Togo
16:00 UTC+0	Tchoutchoui 3'	Report	Farouk 81'	Stadium: Stade de Kégué; Referee: Alhadi Allaou Mahamat (Chad)
Note: CAF awarded Future a 3–0 win as a result of ASKO Kara the illegal fielding the player Kangnivi Ama Tchoutchoui. The match originally ended 1–1.

19 February 2023 2	Future (Egypt)	1–1	(Egypt) Pyramids	Cairo, Egypt
18:00 UTC+2	Mohamed 53'	Report	Hamdy 7'	Stadium: Al Salam Stadium; Referee: Mustapha Ghorbal (Algeria)

26 February 2023 3	ASFAR (Morocco)	2–0	(Egypt) Future	Rabat, Morocco
20:00 UTC+1	Igamane 30'; Diakite 90'	Report		Stadium: Prince Moulay Abdellah Stadium; Referee: Jean Jacques Ndala Ngambo (DR Congo)

8 March 2023 4	Future (Egypt)	0–3; Awarded	(Morocco) ASFAR	Cairo, Egypt
21:00 UTC+2	Mohsen 10' (pen.); Essaoubi 50' (o.g.)	Report		Stadium: Al Salam Stadium; Referee: Abongile Tom (South Africa)

19 March 2023 5	Future (Egypt)	0–3; Awarded	(Togo) ASKO Kara	Cairo, Egypt
18:00 UTC+2	Elfil 41'; Lasheen 72'; Atef 87'	Report		Stadium: Al Salam Stadium; Referee: Lamin Jammeh (Gambia)

2 April 2023 6	Pyramids (Egypt)	3–0; Awarded	(Egypt) Future	Cairo, Egypt
22:00 UTC+2	Gabr 15'; El Said 52'	Report	Atef 90+3'	Stadium: 30 June Stadium; Referee: Issa Sy (Senegal)
