= 2022–23 in Egyptian football =

This article summarizes the activity of Egyptian football during the 2022–23 season, including domestic and international tournaments for senior and youth teams.

== National teams ==
=== Men ===
==== Senior ====
===== Friendlies =====
23 September 2022	Egypt	3–0	Niger	Alexandria, Egypt
20:00 CAT (UTC+2)	Salah 43', 67' (pen.); Mostafa 55'	Report		Stadium: Alexandria Stadium; Referee: Sadok Selmi (Tunisia)

27 September 2022	Egypt	3–0	Liberia	Alexandria, Egypt
20:00 CAT (UTC+2)	Marmoush 38'; Abdel Monem 57'; Hassan 90+4' (pen.)	Report		Stadium: Alexandria Stadium; Referee: Youssef Essrayri (Tunisia)

18 November 2022	Belgium	1–2	Egypt	Kuwait City, Kuwait
18:00 AST (UTC+3)	Openda 76'	Report	Mostafa 33'; Trézéguet 46'	Stadium: Jaber Al Ahmad International Stadium; Referee: Ali Shaban (Kuwait)

18 June 2023	Egypt	3–0	South Sudan	Cairo, Egypt
20:00 CAST (UTC+3)	Fathi 19'; Kahraba 45'; Trézéguet 72'	Report		Stadium: Cairo International Stadium; Referee: Abdullah Jamali (Kuwait)

===== 2023 Africa Cup of Nations qualification =====
Pos	Team	Pld	W	D	L	GF	GA	GD	Pts	Qualification	Egypt	Guinea	Malawi	Ethiopia
1	Egypt	6	5	0	1	10	3	+7	15	Final tournament	—	1–0	2–0	1–0
2	Guinea	6	3	1	2	9	7	+2	10	Final tournament	1–2	—	1–0	2–0
3	Malawi	6	1	2	3	4	10	−6	5		0–4	2–2	—	2–1
4	Ethiopia	6	1	1	4	5	8	−3	4		2–0	2–3	0–0	—

Source: CAF

24 March 2023 3	Egypt	2–0	Malawi	Cairo, Egypt
21:00 CAT (UTC+2)	Salah 20'; Marmoush 45+1'	Report		Stadium: 30 June Stadium; Referee: Pierre Atcho (Gabon)

28 March 2023 4	Malawi	0–4	Egypt	Lilongwe, Malawi
15:00 CAT (UTC+2)		Report	Hamed 4'; Marmoush 16'; Salah 20'; Sayed 49'	Stadium: Bingu National Stadium; Referee: Dahane Beida (Mauritania)

14 June 2023 5	Guinea	1–2	Egypt	Marrakesh, Morocco
19:00 WAT (UTC+1)	Guirassy 26'	Report	Trézéguet 42'; Mostafa 79'	Stadium: Marrakesh Stadium; Referee: Daniel Nii Laryea (Ghana)
Note: The match took place at Marrakesh Stadium in Marrakesh, Morocco, instead of General Lansana Conté Stadium in Conakry, Guinea.

==== U23 ====
===== Friendlies =====
23 September 2022	Egypt	0–0	Benin	Alexandria, Egypt
15:00 CAT (UTC+2)		Report		Stadium: Haras El Hodoud Stadium; Referee: Mahmoud Bassiouny (Egypt)

26 September 2022	Egypt	2–0	Benin	Alexandria, Egypt
18:00 CAT (UTC+2)	El Askalany 3'; El Mizzayn 53'	Report		Stadium: Haras El Hodoud Stadium; Referee: Sobhy El Amrawy (Egypt)

3 February 2023	Egypt	3–0	Gabon	Cairo, Egypt
18:00 CAT (UTC+2)	Saber 33'; Faisal 62'; Adel 67'	Report		Stadium: 30 June Stadium; Referee: Ibrahim Nour El Din (Egypt)

18 March 2023	Egypt	1–0	Sudan	Cairo, Egypt
18:00 CAT (UTC+2)	Saad 41'	Report		Stadium: Osman Ahmed Osman Stadium; Referee: Ahme El Ghandour (Egypt)

===== 2023 U-23 Africa Cup of Nations qualification =====
23 October 2022 Second round - first leg	Eswatini	0–0	Egypt	Lobamba, Eswatini
15:00 CAT (UTC+2)		Report		Stadium: Somhlolo National Stadium; Referee: Retselisitsoe Molise (Lesotho)

30 October 2022 Second round - second leg	Egypt	1–0 (1–0 agg.)	Eswatini	Alexandria, Egypt
20:00 CAT (UTC+2)	Faisal 70'	Report		Stadium: Alexandria Stadium; Referee: Mustapha Ghorbal (Algeria)

22 March 2023 Third round - first leg	Egypt	2–0	Zambia	Cairo, Egypt
18:00 CAT (UTC+2)	Adel 73'; Atef 88'	Report		Stadium: 30 June Stadium; Referee: Tsegay Mogos Teklu (Eritrea)

26 March 2023 Third round - second leg	Zambia	0–0 (0–2 agg.)	Egypt	Ndola, Zambia
15:00 CAT (UTC+2)		Report		Stadium: Levy Mwanawasa Stadium; Referee: Jeannot Franck Bito (Cameroon)

===== 2023 U-23 Africa Cup of Nations =====
Pos	Team	Pld	W	D	L	GF	GA	GD	Pts	Qualification
1	Egypt	3	2	1	0	3	0	+3	7	Advance to knockout stage
2	Mali	3	2	0	1	5	2	+3	6	Advance to knockout stage
3	Niger	3	1	1	1	1	2	−1	4	
4	Gabon	3	0	0	3	1	6	−5	0	

Source: Soccer24
Rules for classification: Group stage tiebreakers

Semi-finals
4 July – Rabat
Morocco (p)	2 (4)
Mali	2 (3)
4 July – Tangier
Egypt	1
Guinea	0

Final
8 July – Rabat
Morocco (a.e.t.)	2
Egypt	1
Third-place match
7 July – Tangier
Mali (p)	0 (4)
Guinea	0 (3)

25 June 2023 1	Egypt	0–0	Niger	Tangier, Morocco
18:00 WAT (UTC+1)		Report		Stadium: Ibn Batouta Stadium; Referee: Adalbert Diouf (Senegal)

28 June 2023 2	Egypt	1–0	Mali	Tangier, Morocco
18:00 WAT (UTC+1)	Adel 10'	Report		Stadium: Ibn Batouta Stadium; Referee: Lamin Jammeh (Gambia)

1 July 2023 3	Gabon	0–2	Egypt	Tangier, Morocco
21:00 WAT (UTC+1)		Report	Saber 82'; Faisal 90+2' (pen.)	Stadium: Ibn Batouta Stadium; Referee: Omar Abdulkadir Artan (Somalia)

=== Youth ===
U17

24 August 2022 2022 Arab Cup U-17	Egypt	3–0	Saudi Arabia	Sig, Algeria
20:00	Adel 18'; Khedr 47'; Abdel Aziz 70'			Stadium: Abdelkrim Kerroum Stadium

27 August 2022 2022 Arab Cup U-17	Lebanon	0–9	Egypt	Sig, Algeria
17:00		Report	Adel 23'; Magoub 52'; Abdel Karim 54'; Riyad 57'; Abdeen 65'; Khedr 69', 72'; Moawad 75'; El-Haddad 90+3'	Stadium: Abdelkrim Kerroum Stadium

30 August 2022 2022 Arab Cup U-17	Egypt	5–0	Syria	Sig, Algeria
20:00	Abdel Aziz 8', 35'; Al Jabara 37' (o.g.); Boustenjy 69', 83'			Stadium: Abdelkrim Kerroum Stadium

2 September 2022 2022 Arab Cup U-17	Egypt	0–2	Morocco	Mostaganem, Algeria
20:00			Maâli 81'; Naïr 90+2'	Stadium: Mohamed Bensaïd Stadium; Referee: Maher El Ali (Lebanon)

8 November 2022 2022 UNAF U-17 Tournament	Libya	2–1	Egypt	Algiers, Algeria
18:15	Al Mesmari 37'; Al Zakouzi 58'	Report	Mohamed 45+1' (pen.)	Stadium: Stade du 5 Juillet; Referee: Lahlou Benbraham (Algeria)

11 November 2022 2022 UNAF U-17 Tournament	Egypt	3–1	Tunisia	Algiers, Algeria
15:00	Abdel-Aziz 15'; Moawad 54'; Abdelkarim 90+1'	Report	Al Gharbi 81'	Stadium: Stade du 5 Juillet; Referee: Mohamed Agha (Libya)

14 November 2022 2022 UNAF U-17 Tournament	Egypt	1–2	Morocco	Algiers, Algeria
15:00	Abdel-Aziz 58'	Report	Maali 7'; Nair 45'	Stadium: Salem Mabrouki Stadium; Referee: Abdoul Karim Twagirumukiza (Rwanda)

U20

21 July 2022 2022 Arab Cup U-20	Egypt	1–0	Oman	Abha, Saudi Arabia
21:00	Hawash 43'	Report		Stadium: Damac Stadium; Referee: Abdullah Al-Kandari (Kuwait)

27 July 2022 2022 Arab Cup U-20	Somalia	0–2	Egypt	Abha, Saudi Arabia
21:00		Report	Hassan 35'; Ibrahim 74'	Stadium: Damac Stadium; Attendance: 3,715; Referee: Sheikh Ahmed Aladdin (Lebanon)

31 July 2022 2022 Arab Cup U-20	Egypt	2–1	Morocco	Abha, Saudi Arabia
19:00	Hawash 32'; Basha 61'		Lyakoubi 23'	Stadium: Damac Stadium; Referee: Sultan Al-Hammadi (United Arab Emirates)

3 August 2022 2022 Arab Cup U-20	Algeria	1–3	Egypt	Abha, Saudi Arabia
21:00	Akhrib 69'		Basha 10'; Rashdan 40'; Ibrahim 76'	Stadium: Prince Sultan bin Abdul Aziz Stadium; Referee: Mohammad Khaled (Bahrain)

7 August 2022 2022 Arab Cup U-20	Saudi Arabia	1–1 (a.e.t.) (5–3 p)	Egypt	Abha, Saudi Arabia
19:30	Al Aliwa 45'	Report	Basha 49'	Stadium: Prince Sultan bin Abdul Aziz Stadium; Attendance: 16,540; Referee: Jalal Jayed (Morocco)
	Penalties
	Radif (penalty scored); Al-Juwayr (penalty scored); Al-Marri (penalty scored); Al-Zubaidi (penalty scored); Al-Oyayari (penalty scored)		(penalty scored) Hassan; (penalty missed) Fayed; (penalty scored) Rashdan; (penalty scored) El Saaiy

17 November 2022 Friendly	Egypt	1–0	Benin	Cairo, Egypt
	Fayed 29'	Report		Stadium: Cairo International Stadium

20 November 2022 Friendly	Egypt	0–0	Benin	Cairo, Egypt
14:30				Stadium: Cairo International Stadium

27 December 2022 Friendly	Egypt	0–2	Ghana	Cairo, Egypt
15:00			Kordzi 15'; Simba 57'	Stadium: Cairo International Stadium

10 February 2023 Friendly	Egypt	1–0	South Sudan	Cairo, Egypt
19:00	Rashdan (pen.)			Stadium: Military Academy Stadium

13 February 2023 Friendly	Egypt	1–1	Uganda	Cairo, Egypt
14:30	Morsi			Stadium: Military Academy Stadium

19 February 2023 2023 U-20 AFCON GS	Egypt	0–0	Mozambique	Cairo, Egypt
16:00		Report		Stadium: Cairo International Stadium; Referee: Omar Artan (Somalia)

22 February 2023 2023 U-20 AFCON GS	Nigeria	1–0	Egypt	Cairo, Egypt
19:00	Agbalaka 71'	Report		Stadium: Cairo International Stadium; Referee: Jean-Claude Ishimwe (Rwanda)

25 February 2023 2023 U-20 AFCON GS	Egypt	0–4	Senegal	Cairo, Egypt
19:00		Report	P. Diop 59', 73', 76'; I. Sané 69'	Stadium: Cairo International Stadium; Referee: Mohamed Athoumani (Comoros)

=== Women ===
==== Senior ====
19 February 2023 Friendly	Lebanon	1–2	Egypt	Jounieh, Lebanon
11:00 UTC+2	Salha 15'	Report	Ismael 53'; Essam 56'	Stadium: Fouad Chehab Stadium; Referee: Doumouh Al Bakkar (Lebanon)

22 February 2023 Friendly	Lebanon	1–2	Egypt	Jounieh, Lebanon
15:00 UTC+3	Iskandar 55'	Report	Ismael 42'; Maustafa 88'	Stadium: Fouad Chehab Stadium; Referee: Doumouh Al Bakkar (Lebanon)

==== Youth ====
U20

14 March 2023 2023 UNAF U-20 Women's Tournament	Tunisia	1–3	Egypt	Al-Kram Stadium, Tunis
11:00	Boussaida 73'	Report	Ramadan 18' (pen.); Mostafa 45'; Zaher 57'	Referee: Ghada Mehat (Algeria)

16 March 2023 2023 UNAF U-20 Women's Tournament	Algeria	2–1	Egypt	Al-Kram Stadium, Tunis
14:00	Zemma 74' (pen.); Sidi Moussa 80'	Report	Mostafa 29'	Referee: Amina Fakhr (Morocco)

18 March 2023 2023 UNAF U-20 Women's Tournament	Egypt	0–1	Morocco	Al-Kram Stadium, Tunis
12:00		Report	Nouhaili 80+2'	Referee: Emna Ajbouni (Tunisia)

== League season ==
=== Premier League ===
Pos	Team	Pld	W	D	L	GF	GA	GD	Pts	Qualification or relegation
1	Al Ahly (C)	34	25	8	1	63	13	+50	83	Qualification for the Champions League second round
2	Pyramids	34	22	7	5	58	24	+34	73	Qualification for the Champions League second round
3	Zamalek	34	17	9	8	52	36	+16	60	Qualification for the Confederation Cup second round (Note: Since the 2022–23 Egypt Cup wouldn't finish by the CAF deadline for associations to submit teams participating in next season's African competitions, the spot awarded to the Egypt Cup winners (Confederation Cup first or second round) was passed to the fourth-placed team in the league.)
4	Future	34	15	13	6	34	23	+11	58	Qualification for the Confederation Cup second round
5	Al Masry	34	11	15	8	34	33	+1	48	
6	ENPPI	34	13	6	15	34	40	−6	45	
7	Al Mokawloon Al Arab	34	9	17	8	35	33	+2	44	
8	Al Ittihad	34	12	7	15	36	43	−7	43	
9	Pharco	34	9	15	10	31	34	−3	42 (Note: Head-to-head points: Pharco 6, Smouha 0.)	
10	Smouha	34	10	12	12	36	43	−7	42	
11	Ismaily	34	9	13	12	35	38	−3	40	
12	National Bank of Egypt	34	9	12	13	35	40	−5	39	
13	Ceramica Cleopatra	34	7	16	11	31	32	−1	37	
14	Tala'ea El Gaish	34	8	12	14	33	45	−12	36	
15	El Dakhleya	34	7	14	13	32	43	−11	35	
16	Aswan (R)	34	8	9	17	31	45	−14	33 (Note: Tied on head-to-head points (3) and on head-to-head goal difference (0). Overall goal difference: Aswan −14, Ghazl El Mahalla −21.)	Relegation to Second Division A
17	Ghazl El Mahalla (R)	34	8	9	17	26	47	−21	33	Relegation to Second Division A
18	Haras El Hodoud (R)	34	5	10	19	21	45	−24	25	Relegation to Second Division A

Source: Soccerway
Rules for classification: 1) Points; 2) Head-to-head points; 3) Head-to-head goal difference; 4) Goal difference; 5) Goals scored; 6) Play-off.
(C) Champions; (R) Relegated

=== Second Division ===
==== Group A ====
Pos	Team	Pld	W	D	L	GF	GA	GD	Pts	Promotion, qualification or relegation
1	El Gouna (P)	30	21	6	3	54	23	+31	69	Promotion to Premier League
2	La Viena	30	21	5	4	51	19	+32	68	Qualification to Second Division A
3	Asyut Petroleum	30	18	5	7	40	18	+22	59	Qualification to Second Division A
4	Al Nasr Lel Taa'den	30	15	8	7	40	26	+14	53	Qualification to Second Division A
5	Misr Lel Makkasa	30	12	12	6	46	41	+5	48	Qualification to Second Division A
6	El Minya (R)	30	12	10	8	32	24	+8	46	Qualification for Second Division A/B play-offs
7	KIMA Aswan (R)	30	12	9	9	34	31	+3	45	Relegation to Second Division B
8	Dayrout (R)	30	10	10	10	40	33	+7	40 (Note: Tied on head-to-head points (3). Head-to-head goal difference: Dayrout +1, Al Aluminium –1.)	Relegation to Second Division B
9	Al Aluminium (R)	30	11	7	12	36	28	+8	40	Relegation to Second Division B
10	Asyut Cement (R)	30	10	8	12	32	38	−6	38	Relegation to Second Division B
11	Muslim Youths (Qena) (R)	30	7	9	14	31	40	−9	30	Relegation to Second Division B
12	Faiyum (R)	30	6	8	16	26	39	−13	26	Relegation to Second Division B
13	MS Tamya (R)	30	5	10	15	22	44	−22	25	Relegation to Second Division B
14	Mallawi (R)	30	5	8	17	24	53	−29	23 (Note: Head-to-head points: Mallawi 6, Telephonat Beni Suef 0.)	Relegation to Second Division B
15	Telephonat Beni Suef (R)	30	5	8	17	26	50	−24	23	Relegation to Second Division B
16	Al Madina Al Monawara (T)	30	5	7	18	30	57	−27	22	Relegation to Third Division

Source: Soccerway
Rules for classification: 1) Points; 2) Head-to-Head points; 3) Head-to-Head goal difference; 4) Head-to-Head goals scored; 5) Head-to-Head away goals scored; 6) Goal difference; 7) Goals scored; 8) Play-offs (only if needed to decide teams for promotion or teams for relegation).
(P) Promoted; (R) Relegated to Second Division B; (T) Relegated to Third Division.

==== Group B ====
Pos	Team	Pld	W	D	L	GF	GA	GD	Pts	Promotion, qualification or relegation
1	ZED (P)	30	18	11	1	44	19	+25	65	Promotion to Premier League
2	Wadi Degla	30	17	4	9	40	31	+9	55	Qualification to Second Division A
3	El Sekka El Hadid	30	15	9	6	42	27	+15	54	Qualification to Second Division A
4	El Qanah	30	16	5	9	33	25	+8	53	Qualification to Second Division A
5	Petrojet	30	14	10	6	41	23	+18	52	Qualification to Second Division A
6	Telecom Egypt (O)	30	14	7	9	43	31	+12	49 (Note: Tied on head-to-head points (2), on head-to-head goal difference (0), on head-to-head goals scored (0) and on head-to-head away goals scored (0). Overall goal difference: Telecom Egypt +12, Al Obour +1.)	Qualification for Second Division A/B play-offs
7	Al Obour (R)	30	14	7	9	25	24	+1	49	Relegation to Second Division B
8	Tersana (R)	30	12	12	6	31	21	+10	48	Relegation to Second Division B
9	Suez (R)	30	11	8	11	38	33	+5	41	Relegation to Second Division B
10	El Entag El Harby (R)	30	10	8	12	28	29	−1	38 (Note: Head-to-head points: El Entag El Harby 6, Porto Suez 0.)	Relegation to Second Division B
11	Porto Suez (R)	30	11	5	14	30	37	−7	38	Relegation to Second Division B
12	Al Mostaqbal (R)	30	7	8	15	32	40	−8	29	Relegation to Second Division B
13	Eastern Company (R)	30	7	7	16	29	43	−14	28	Relegation to Second Division B
14	Kahraba Ismailia (R)	30	6	9	15	33	42	−9	27	Relegation to Second Division B
15	Al Nasr (R)	30	6	6	18	24	47	−23	24	Relegation to Second Division B
16	Media (T)	30	2	4	24	13	54	−41	10	Relegation to Third Division

Source: Soccerway
Rules for classification: 1) Points; 2) Head-to-Head points; 3) Head-to-Head goal difference; 4) Head-to-Head goals scored; 5) Head-to-Head away goals scored; 6) Goal difference; 7) Goals scored; 8) Play-offs (only if needed to decide teams for promotion or teams for relegation).
(O) Avoided relegation to Second Division B through play-offs; (P) Promoted; (R) Relegated to Second Division B; (T) Relegated to Third Division.

==== Group C ====
Pos	Team	Pld	W	D	L	GF	GA	GD	Pts	Promotion, qualification or relegation
1	Baladiyat El Mahalla (P)	30	16	10	4	46	16	+30	58	Promotion to Premier League
2	Tanta	30	16	9	5	40	19	+21	57	Qualification to Second Division A
3	Dikernis	30	14	10	6	34	26	+8	52	Qualification to Second Division A
4	Abou Qir Fertilizers	30	14	9	7	41	34	+7	51 (Note: Head-to-head points: Abou Qir Fertilizers 4, Gomhoriat Shebin 1.)	Qualification to Second Division A
5	Gomhoriat Shebin	30	13	12	5	25	16	+9	51	Qualification to Second Division A
6	Proxy (O)	30	12	12	6	42	29	+13	48 (Note: Head-to-head points: Proxy 4, Kafr El Sheikh 1.)	Qualification for Second Division A/B play-offs
7	Kafr El Sheikh (R)	30	12	12	6	29	23	+6	48	Relegation to Second Division B
8	El Mansoura (R)	30	9	14	7	28	24	+4	41	Relegation to Second Division B
9	Olympic Club (R)	30	7	16	7	24	24	0	37	Relegation to Second Division B
10	Sporting Alexandria (R)	30	7	13	10	22	25	−3	34	Relegation to Second Division B
11	Al Hammam (R)	30	7	11	12	25	37	−12	32	Relegation to Second Division B
12	Al Magd (R)	30	6	13	11	24	36	−12	31	Relegation to Second Division B
13	Ittihad Nabarouh (R)	30	8	5	17	20	35	−15	29	Relegation to Second Division B
14	Al Hilal (El Dabaa) (R)	30	6	7	17	20	36	−16	25 (Note: Head-to-head points: Al Hilal (El Dabaa) 4, Pioneers 1.)	Relegation to Second Division B
15	Pioneers (R)	30	4	13	13	15	27	−12	25	Relegation to Second Division B
16	Al Masry (El Salloum) (T)	30	3	6	21	22	50	−28	15	Relegation to Third Division

Source: Soccerway
Rules for classification: 1) Points; 2) Head-to-Head points; 3) Head-to-Head goal difference; 4) Head-to-Head goals scored; 5) Head-to-Head away goals scored; 6) Goal difference; 7) Goals scored; 8) Play-offs (only if needed to decide teams for promotion or teams for relegation).
(O) Avoided relegation to Second Division B through play-offs; (P) Promoted; (R) Relegated to Second Division B; (T) Relegated to Third Division.

==== Play-offs ====
Pos	Team	Pld	W	D	L	GF	GA	GD	Pts	Qualification or relegation
1	Proxy	2	1	1	0	3	2	+1	4	Qualification to Second Division A
2	Telecom Egypt	2	1	0	1	5	5	0	3	Qualification to Second Division A
3	El Minya (R)	2	0	1	1	6	7	−1	1	Relegation to Second Division B

Source: Soccerway
Rules for classification: 1) Points; 2) Head-to-Head points; 3) Goal difference; 4) Goals scored; 5) Play-offs (only if needed to decide teams for promotion or teams for relegation).
(R) Relegated

== Continental competitions ==
=== CAF Champions League ===
Al Ahly

Pos	Team	Pld	W	D	L	GF	GA	GD	Pts	Qualification	MDS	ASC	HIL	CSG
1	(South Africa) Mamelodi Sundowns	6	4	2	0	14	7	+7	14	Advance to knockout stage	—	5–2	1–0	2–1
2	(Egypt) Al Ahly	6	3	1	2	14	8	+6	10 (Note: Head-to-head points: Al Ahly 3, Al Hilal 3. Head-to-head goal difference: Al Ahly +2, Al Hilal -2)	Advance to knockout stage	2–2	—	3–0	3–0
3	(Sudan) Al Hilal	6	3	1	2	6	6	0	10		1–1	1–0	—	2–0
4	(Cameroon) Coton Sport	6	0	0	6	3	16	−13	0		1–3	0–4	1–2	—

Source: CAF
Rules for classification: Group stage tiebreakers
Notes:

18 February 2023 2	Al Hilal (Sudan)	1–0	(Egypt) Al Ahly	Omdurman, Sudan
15:00 UTC+2	Lilepo 53'	Report		Stadium: Al Hilal Stadium; Referee: Dahane Beida (Mauritania)

25 February 2023 3	Al Ahly (Egypt)	2–2	(South Africa) Mamelodi Sundowns	Cairo, Egypt
21:00 UTC+2	Abdelmonem 59'; El Shahat 74'	Report	Shalulile 34'; Morena 80'	Stadium: Al Ahly WE Al Salam Stadium; Referee: Bamlak Tessema Weyesa (Ethiopia)

4 March 2023 1	Al Ahly (Egypt)	3–0	(Cameroon) Coton Sport	Cairo, Egypt
18:00 UTC+2	Sherif 1'; Kendouci 40'; Khalil 90+2'	Report		Stadium: Al Ahly WE Al Salam Stadium; Referee: Ahmad Imtehaz Heeralall (Mauritius)
Note: The Al Ahly v Coton Sport match, originally scheduled to be played on 10 or 11 February 2023, was rescheduled to 4 March 2023 due to Al Ahly's participation in the 2022 FIFA Club World Cup in Morocco between 1 and 11 February 2023.

11 March 2023 4	Mamelodi Sundowns (South Africa)	5–2	(Egypt) Al Ahly	Pretoria, South Africa
15:00 UTC+2	Allende 4'; Zwane 24'; Mokoena 40'; Shalulile 72', 88'	Report	Sherif 13'; Tau 61'	Stadium: Loftus Versfeld Stadium; Referee: Issa Sy (Senegal)

17 March 2023 5	Coton Sport (Cameroon)	0–4	(Egypt) Al Ahly	Garoua, Cameroon
17:00 UTC+1		Report	Kahraba 23', 29', 51'; Tau 54'	Stadium: Roumdé Adjia Stadium; Referee: Peter Waweru (Kenya)

1 April 2023 6	Al Ahly (Egypt)	3–0	(Sudan) Al Hilal	Cairo, Egypt
21:00 UTC+2	Kahraba 25'; El Shahat 64', 81'	Report		Stadium: Al Ahly WE Al Salam Stadium; Referee: Abdel Aziz Mohamed Bouh (Mauritania)

22 April 2023 Quarter-final 1st leg	Al Ahly (Egypt)	2–0	(Morocco) Raja CA	Cairo, Egypt
21:00 UTC+2	Abdelmonem 45+2'; Fathy 84'	Report		Stadium: Cairo International Stadium; Attendance: 52,000; Referee: Mahmood Ismail (Sudan)

29 April 2023 Quarter-final 2nd leg	Raja CA (Morocco)	0–0 (0–2 agg.)	(Egypt) Al Ahly	Casablanca, Morocco
20:00 UTC+1		Report		Stadium: Stade Mohammed V Attendance: 39,000; Referee: Ibrahim Mutaz (Libya)

12 May 2023 Semi-final 1st leg	Espérance de Tunis (Tunisia)	0–3	(Egypt) Al Ahly	Tunis, Tunisia
20:00 UTC+1		Report	Tau 8', 55'; Kahraba 75'	Stadium: Stade Hammadi Agrebi; Attendance: 0 Referee: Peter Waweru (Kenya)

19 May 2023 Semi-final 2nd leg	Al Ahly (Egypt)	1–0 (4–0 agg.)	(Tunisia) Espérance de Tunis	Cairo, Egypt
22:00 UTC+3	El Shahat 22'	Report		Stadium: Cairo International Stadium; Attendance: 10,000; Referee: Dahane Beida (Mauritania)

4 June 2023 Final 1st leg	Al Ahly (Egypt)	2–1	(Morocco) Wydad AC	Cairo, Egypt
21:00 UTC+3	Tau 45+4'; Kahraba 59'	Report	Bouhra 86'	Stadium: Cairo International Stadium; Attendance: 50,000; Referee: Ibrahim Mutaz (Libya)

11 June 2023 Final 2nd leg	Wydad AC (Morocco)	1–1 (2–3 agg.)	(Egypt) Al Ahly	Casablanca, Morocco
20:00 UTC+1	Attiyat Allah 27'	Report	Abdelmonem 78'	Stadium: Stade Mohammed V Attendance: 45,000; Referee: Bamlak Tessema Weyesa (Ethiopia)

Zamalek

Pos	Team	Pld	W	D	L	GF	GA	GD	Pts	Qualification	EST	CRB	ZSC	MSC
1	(Tunisia) Espérance de Tunis	6	3	2	1	6	4	+2	11	Advance to knockout stage	—	0–0	2–0	1–0
2	(Algeria) CR Belouizdad	6	3	1	2	4	2	+2	10	Advance to knockout stage	0–1	—	2–0	1–0
3	(Egypt) Zamalek	6	2	1	3	7	9	−2	7		3–1	0–1	—	4–3
4	(Sudan) Al Merrikh	6	1	2	3	5	7	−2	5		1–1	1–0	0–0	—

Source: CAF
Rules for classification: Group stage tiebreakers

10 February 2023 1	Zamalek (Egypt)	0–1	(Algeria) CR Belouizdad	Cairo, Egypt
18:00 UTC+2		Report	Wamba 57' (pen.)	Stadium: Cairo International Stadium; Referee: Issa Sy (Senegal)

17 February 2023 2	Al Merrikh (Sudan)	0–0	(Egypt) Zamalek	Benghazi (Libya)
15:00 UTC+2		Report		Stadium: Benina Martyrs Stadium; Referee: Daniel Nii Laryea (Ghana)
Note: Al Merrikh play their group stage home matches at Benina Martyrs Stadium, Benghazi (Libya), instead of their regular home stadium Al Merrikh Stadium, Omdurman, which did not meet CAF requirements.

25 February 2023 3	Espérance de Tunis (Tunisia)	2–0	(Egypt) Zamalek	Tunis, Tunisia
17:00 UTC+1	Ben Hammouda 35'; Ben Romdhane 90+2'	Report		Stadium: Stade Hammadi Agrebi; Referee: Redouane Jiyed (Morocco)

7 March 2023 4	Zamalek (Egypt)	3–1	(Tunisia) Espérance de Tunis	Cairo, Egypt
21:00 UTC+2	Gaafar 9'; Zizo 29'; Jaziri 90+1'	Report	Benayad 57'	Stadium: Cairo International Stadium; Referee: Blaise Yuven Ngwa (Cameroon)

17 March 2023 5	CR Belouizdad (Algeria)	2–0	(Egypt) Zamalek	Annaba, Algeria
20:00 UTC+1	Draoui 75'; Wamba 79'	Report		Stadium: 19 May 1956 Stadium; Referee: Ibrahim Mutaz (Libya)
Note: CR Belouizdad play some of their group stage home matches at 19 May 1956 Stadium, Annaba, instead of Stade du 5 Juillet, Algiers, due to the intensity of matches in the same period at the stadium.

31 March 2023 6	Zamalek (Egypt)	4–3	(Sudan) Al Merrikh	Cairo, Egypt
21:00 UTC+2	Shalaby 1'; Mansi 3', 64', 90+4'	Report	Agab 7'; Nouh 48'; Sérgio 56'	Stadium: Cairo International Stadium; Referee: Samuel Uwikunda (Rwanda)

=== CAF Confederation Cup ===
Future

Pos	Team	Pld	W	D	L	GF	GA	GD	Pts	Qualification	FAR	PFC	ASK	FUT
1	(Morocco) ASFAR	6	4	2	0	14	4	+10	14	Advance to knockout stage	—	1–0	5–1	2–0
2	(Egypt) Pyramids	6	3	2	1	11	5	+6	11	Advance to knockout stage	2–2	—	1–0	3–0 (Note: Awarded)
3	(Togo) ASKO Kara	6	1	1	4	6	14	−8	4 (Note: Head-to-head points: ASKO Kara 3, Future 3. Head-to-head goal difference: ASKO Kara 0, Future 0. Head-to-head goals scored: ASKO Kara 3, Future 3. Head-to-head away goals scored: ASKO Kara 3, Future 3. Goal difference: ASKO Kara -8, Future -8. Goals scored: ASKO Kara 6, Future 4)		1–1	1–4	—	0–3 (Note: Awarded)
4	(Egypt) Future	6	1	1	4	4	12	−8	4		0–3 (Note: Awarded)	1–1	0–3 (Note: Awarded)	—

Source: CAF
Rules for classification: Group stage tiebreakers
Notes:

12 February 2023 1	ASKO Kara (Togo)	0–3; Awarded	(Egypt) Future	Stade de Kégué, Lomé
16:00 UTC+0	Tchoutchoui 3'	Report	Farouk 81'	Referee: Alhadi Allaou Mahamat (Chad)

19 February 2023 2	Future (Egypt)	1–1	(Egypt) Pyramids	Al Ahly WE Al Salam Stadium, Cairo
18:00 UTC+2	Mohamed 53'	Report	Hamdy 7'	Referee: Mustapha Ghorbal (Algeria)

26 February 2023 3	ASFAR (Morocco)	2–0	(Egypt) Future	Prince Moulay Abdellah Stadium, Rabat
20:00 UTC+1	Igamane 30'; Diakite 90'	Report		Referee: Jean Jacques Ndala Ngambo (DR Congo)

8 March 2023 4	Future (Egypt)	2–0	(Morocco) ASFAR	Al Ahly WE Al Salam Stadium, Cairo
--:-- UTC+2	Mohsen 10' (pen.); Essaoubi 50' (o.g.)	Report		Referee: Abongile Tom (South Africa)

19 March 2023 5	Future (Egypt)	3–0	(Togo) ASKO Kara	Al Ahly WE Al Salam Stadium, Cairo
18:00 UTC+2	Elfil 41'; Lasheen 72'; Atef 87'	Report		Referee: Lamin Jammeh (Gambia)

2 April 2023 6	Pyramids (Egypt)	3–0; Awarded	(Egypt) Future	30 June Stadium, Cairo
22:00 UTC+2	Gabr 15'; El Said 52'	Report	Atef 90+3'	Referee: Issa Sy (Senegal)

Pyramids

Pos	Team	Pld	W	D	L	GF	GA	GD	Pts	Qualification	FAR	PFC	ASK	FUT
1	(Morocco) ASFAR	6	4	2	0	14	4	+10	14	Advance to knockout stage	—	1–0	5–1	2–0
2	(Egypt) Pyramids	6	3	2	1	11	5	+6	11	Advance to knockout stage	2–2	—	1–0	3–0 (Note: Awarded)
3	(Togo) ASKO Kara	6	1	1	4	6	14	−8	4 (Note: Head-to-head points: ASKO Kara 3, Future 3. Head-to-head goal difference: ASKO Kara 0, Future 0. Head-to-head goals scored: ASKO Kara 3, Future 3. Head-to-head away goals scored: ASKO Kara 3, Future 3. Goal difference: ASKO Kara -8, Future -8. Goals scored: ASKO Kara 6, Future 4)		1–1	1–4	—	0–3 (Note: Awarded)
4	(Egypt) Future	6	1	1	4	4	12	−8	4		0–3 (Note: Awarded)	1–1	0–3 (Note: Awarded)	—

Source: CAF
Rules for classification: Group stage tiebreakers
Notes:

12 February 2023 1	Pyramids (Egypt)	2–2	(Morocco) ASFAR	30 June Stadium, Cairo
21:00 UTC+2	Fathi 1'; El Said 75'	Report	Diney 25'; Sahd 73'	Referee: Ibrahim Mutaz (Libya)

19 February 2023 2	Future (Egypt)	1–1	(Egypt) Pyramids	Al Ahly WE Al Salam Stadium, Cairo
18:00 UTC+2	Mohamed 53'	Report	Hamdy 7'	Referee: Mustapha Ghorbal (Algeria)

26 February 2023 3	Pyramids (Egypt)	1–0	(Togo) ASKO Kara	30 June Stadium, Cairo
18:00 UTC+2	Ben Youssef 28'	Report		Referee: Messie Jessie Oved Nkounkou (Congo)

8 March 2023 4	ASKO Kara (Togo)	1–4	(Egypt) Pyramids	Stade de Kégué, Lomé
16:00 UTC+0	Tchoutchoui 66'	Report	Ben Youssef 3'; Fathi 26', 36'; Issa 64'	Referee: Celso Armindo Alvação (Mozambique)

19 March 2023 5	ASFAR (Morocco)	1–0	(Egypt) Pyramids	Prince Moulay Abdellah Stadium, Rabat
19:00 UTC+0	Hammoudan 61'	Report		Referee: Daniel Nii Laryea (Ghana)

2 April 2023 6	Pyramids (Egypt)	3–0; Awarded	(Egypt) Future	30 June Stadium, Cairo
22:00 UTC+2	Gabr 15'; El Said 52'	Report	Atef 90+3'	Referee: Issa Sy (Senegal)

== International competitions ==
1 February 2023 2022 FIFA Club World Cup 1st R	Al Ahly (Egypt)	3–0	(New Zealand) Auckland City	Ibn Batouta Stadium, Tangier
20:00	El Shahat 45+2'; Sherif 56'; Tau 86'	Report		Attendance: 47,137; Referee: Ma Ning (China)

4 February 2023 2022 FIFA Club World Cup 2nd R	Seattle Sounders FC (United States)	0–1	(Egypt) Al Ahly	Ibn Batouta Stadium, Tangier
18:00		Report	Magdy 88'	Attendance: 30,589; Referee: Anthony Taylor (England)

8 February 2023 2022 FIFA Club World Cup SF	Al Ahly (Egypt)	1–4	(Spain) Real Madrid	Prince Moulay Abdellah Stadium, Rabat
20:00	Maâloul 65' (pen.)	Report	Vinícius 42'; Valverde 46'; Rodrygo 90+2'; Arribas 90+8'	Attendance: 43,508; Referee: Andrés Matonte (Uruguay)

11 February 2023 2022 FIFA Club World Cup 3rd	Al Ahly (Egypt)	2–4	(Brazil) Flamengo	Ibn Batouta Stadium, Tangier
16:30	Abdel Kader 38', 60'	Report	Gabriel Barbosa 11' (pen.), 85' (pen.); Pedro 77', 90+1'	Attendance: 30,216; Referee: Mustapha Ghorbal (Algeria)
