= 2022–23 CAF Confederation Cup knockout stage =

International football competition in Africa

- Dates: 23 April – 3 June 2023

Tournament statistics
- Matches played: 14
- Goals scored: 25 (1.79 per match)

The 2022–23 CAF Confederation Cup knockout stage started on 23 April with the quarter-finals and ended on 3 June 2023 with the final to decide the champions of the 2022–23 CAF Confederation Cup. A total of eight teams competed in the knockout stage.

Times were local.

== Round and draw dates ==
The schedule was as follows.

Round	Draw date	First leg	Second leg
Quarter-finals	5 April 2023	23 April 2023	30 April 2023
Semi-finals	5 April 2023	10 May 2023	17 May 2023
Final	5 April 2023	28 May 2023	3 June 2023

== Format ==
Each tie in the knockout phase was played over two legs, with each team playing one leg at home. The team that scored more goals on aggregate over the two legs advanced to the next round. If the aggregate score was level, the away goals rule was applied, i.e. the team that scored more goals away from home over the two legs advanced. If away goals were also equal, then extra time was not played and the winners were decided by a penalty shoot-out (Regulations III. 26 & 27). The mechanism of the draws for each round was as follows:

- In the draw for the quarter-finals, the four group winners were seeded, and the four group runners-up were unseeded. The seeded teams were drawn against the unseeded teams, with the seeded teams hosting the second leg. Teams from the same group cannot be drawn against each other, while teams from the same association can be drawn against each other.
- In the draws for the semi-finals, there were no seedings, and teams from the same group or the same association could be drawn against each other. As the draws for the quarter-finals and semi-finals were held together before the quarter-finals were played, the identity of the quarter-final winners was not known at the time of the semi-final draw.

== Qualified teams ==
The knockout stage involved the 8 teams which qualified as winners and runners-up of each of the eight groups in the group stage.

Group	Winners	Runners-up
A	(South Africa) Marumo Gallants	(Algeria) USM Alger
B	(Ivory Coast) ASEC Mimosas	(Nigeria) Rivers United
C	(Morocco) ASFAR	(Egypt) Pyramids
D	(Tanzania) Young Africans	(Tunisia) US Monastir

== Bracket ==
The bracket of the knockout stage was determined as follows:

Round	Matchups
Quarter-finals	(Group winners hosted second leg, matchups decided by draw, teams from same group cannot play each other): QF1; QF2; QF3; QF4
Semi-finals	(Matchups and order of legs decided by draw, between winners QF1, QF2, QF3, QF4): SF1; SF2
Final	Winners SF1 and SF2 faced each other in two legs to decide the champions

The bracket was decided after the draw for the knockout stage (quarter-finals, semi-finals and final), which was held on 5 April 2023, 18:30 GMT (20:30 local time, UTC+2), at the CAF headquarters in Cairo, Egypt.

Quarter-finals
(Nigeria) Rivers United	0	0	0
(Tanzania) Young Africans	2	0	2
(Egypt) Pyramids	1	0	1
(South Africa) Marumo Gallants	1	1	2
(Tunisia) US Monastir	0	0	0
(Ivory Coast) ASEC Mimosas	0	2	2
(Algeria) USM Alger	2	2	4
(Morocco) ASFAR	0	3	3

Semi-finals
(Tanzania) Young Africans	2	2	4
(South Africa) Marumo Gallants	0	1	1
(Ivory Coast) ASEC Mimosas	0	0	0
(Algeria) USM Alger	0	2	2

Final
(Tanzania) Young Africans	1	1	2
(Algeria) USM Alger (a)	2	0	2

== Quarter-finals ==
The draw for the quarter-finals was held on 5 April 2023.

=== Summary ===
The first legs were played on 23 April, and the second legs were played on 30 April 2023.

Team 1	Agg.	Team 2	1st leg	2nd leg
Pyramids (Egypt)	1–2	(South Africa) Marumo Gallants	1–1	0–1
US Monastir (Tunisia)	0–2	(Ivory Coast) ASEC Mimosas	0–0	0–2
USM Alger (Algeria)	4–3	(Morocco) ASFAR	2–0	2–3
Rivers United (Nigeria)	0–2	(Tanzania) Young Africans	0–2	0–0

=== Matches ===
23 April 2023
18:00 UTC+2

Pyramids (Egypt)	1–1	(South Africa) Marumo Gallants
Sobhi 90+2' (pen.)	Report	Chivaviro 55'

30 June Stadium, Cairo
Referee: Ibrahim Kalilou Traore (Ivory Coast)
30 April 2023
18:00 UTC+2

Marumo Gallants (South Africa)	1–0	(Egypt) Pyramids
Ngema 39'	Report

Royal Bafokeng Stadium, Rustenburg
Referee: Pierre Atcho (Gabon)

Marumo Gallants won 2–1 on aggregate.

23 April 2023
17:00 UTC+1

US Monastir (Tunisia)	0–0	(Ivory Coast) ASEC Mimosas
	Report

Stade Hammadi Agrebi, Tunis (Note: US Monastir played their knockout stage home matches at Stade Hammadi Agrebi, Tunis, instead of their regular home stadium Stade Mustapha Ben Jannet, Monastir, which did not meet CAF requirements.)
Referee: Bamlak Tessema Weyesa (Ethiopia)
30 April 2023
16:00 UTC+0

ASEC Mimosas (Ivory Coast)	2–0	(Tunisia) US Monastir
Zouzou 45+1'; Zouzoua 90+1'	Report

Stade Bouaké, Bouaké (Note: ASEC Mimosas played their knockout stage home matches at Stade Bouaké, Bouaké, instead of their regular home stadium Stade Félix Houphouët-Boigny, Abidjan, which is in the process of renovations in preparation for Ivory Coast hosting 2023 Africa Cup of Nations.)
Referee: Samuel Uwikunda (Rwanda)

ASEC Mimosas won 2–0 on aggregate.

23 April 2023
20:00 UTC+1

USM Alger (Algeria)	2–0	(Morocco) ASFAR
Radouani 44'; Belaïd 62'	Report

Stade du 5 Juillet, Algiers
Referee: Ahmad Imtehaz Heeralall (Mauritius)
30 April 2023
20:00 UTC+1

ASFAR (Morocco)	3–2	(Algeria) USM Alger
Chita 8' (o.g.); Diney 60'; Hrimat 90+7' (pen.)	Report	Radouani 12'; Bousseliou 78'

Prince Moulay Abdellah Stadium, Rabat
Referee: Mohamed Marouf Eid Mansour (Egypt)

USM Alger won 4–3 on aggregate.

23 April 2023
14:00 UTC+1

Rivers United (Nigeria)	0–2	(Tanzania) Young Africans
	Report	Mayele 73', 81'

Godswill Akpabio International Stadium, Uyo
Referee: Abongile Tom (South Africa)
30 April 2023
19:00 UTC+3

Young Africans (Tanzania)	0–0	(Nigeria) Rivers United
	Report

National Stadium, Dar es Salaam
Referee: Redouane Jiyed (Morocco)

Young Africans won 2–0 on aggregate.

== Semi-finals ==
The draw for the semi-finals was held on 5 April 2023 (after the quarter-finals draw).

=== Summary ===
The first legs were played on 10 May, and the second legs were played on 17 May 2023.

Team 1	Agg.	Team 2	1st leg	2nd leg
Young Africans (Tanzania)	4–1	(South Africa) Marumo Gallants	2–0	2–1
ASEC Mimosas (Ivory Coast)	0–2	(Algeria) USM Alger	0–0	0–2

=== Matches ===
10 May 2023
16:00 UTC+3

Young Africans (Tanzania)	2–0	(South Africa) Marumo Gallants
Aziz Ki 64'; Morrison 90+2'	Report

National Stadium, Dar es Salaam
Referee: Mahmoud El Banna (Egypt)
17 May 2023
18:00 UTC+2

Marumo Gallants (South Africa)	1–2	(Tanzania) Young Africans
Chivaviro 90+1'	Report	Mayele 45+1'; Musonda 62'

Royal Bafokeng Stadium, Rustenburg
Referee: Mutaz Ibrahim (Libya)

Young Africans won 4–1 on aggregate.

10 May 2023
16:00 UTC+0

ASEC Mimosas (Ivory Coast)	0–0	(Algeria) USM Alger
	Report

Stade Bouaké, Bouaké
Referee: Alhadi Allaou Mahamat (Chad)
17 May 2023
20:00 UTC+1

USM Alger (Algeria)	2–0	(Ivory Coast) ASEC Mimosas
Bousseliou 28'; Belkacemi 80'	Report

Stade du 5 Juillet, Algiers
Referee: Pierre Atcho (Gabon)

USM Alger won 2–0 on aggregate.

== Final ==
The first leg was played on 28 May, and the second leg was played on 3 June 2023.

Team 1	Agg.	Team 2	1st leg	2nd leg
Young Africans (Tanzania)	2–2 (a)	(Algeria) USM Alger	1–2	1–0

28 May 2023
16:00 UTC+3

Young Africans (Tanzania)	1–2	(Algeria) USM Alger
Mayele 82'	Report	Mahious 32'; Merili 84'

Benjamin Mkapa Stadium, Dar es Salaam
Attendance: 60,000
Referee: Jean-Jacques Ndala (DR Congo)
3 June 2023
20:00 UTC+1

USM Alger (Algeria)	0–1	(Tanzania) Young Africans
	Report	Shabani 7' (pen.)

Stade du 5 Juillet, Algiers
Attendance: 64,000
Referee: Dahane Beida (Mauritania)

2–2 on aggregate. USM Alger won on away goals.
