= 2022–23 CAF Confederation Cup group stage =

International football competition in Africa

- Dates: 12 February – 2 April 2023

Tournament statistics
- Matches played: 48
- Goals scored: 122 (2.54 per match)

The 2022–23 CAF Confederation Cup group stage began on 12 February and ended on 2 April 2023. A total of 16 teams competed in the group stage to decide the eight places in the knockout stage of the 2022–23 CAF Confederation Cup.

== Draw ==
The draw for the group stage was held on 12 December 2022, 11:00 GMT (13:00 local time, UTC+2), at the CAF headquarters in Cairo, Egypt. The 16 winners of the playoff round of qualifying were drawn into four groups of four.

The teams were seeded by their performances in the CAF competitions for the previous five seasons (CAF 5-year ranking points shown next to every team). Each group contained one team from each of Pot 1, Pot 2, Pot 3, and Pot 4, and each team was allocated to the positions in their group according to their pot.

Pot	Pot 1	Pot 2
Teams	(Democratic Republic of the Congo) TP Mazembe (43 pts); (Egypt) Pyramids (34 pts); (Ivory Coast) ASEC Mimosas (8 pts); (Algeria) USM Alger (5 pts)	(Democratic Republic of the Congo) Motema Pembe (3 pts); (Tanzania) Young Africans (0.5 pts); (Republic of the Congo) Diables Noirs; (Democratic Republic of the Congo) Saint-Éloi Lupopo; (Egypt) Future; (Libya) Al Akhdar; (Mali) Real Bamako; (Morocco) ASFAR; (Nigeria) Rivers United; (South Africa) Marumo Gallants; (Togo) ASKO Kara; (Tunisia) US Monastir

== Format ==
In the group stage, each group was played on a home-and-away round-robin basis. The winners and runners-up of each group advanced to the quarter-finals of the knockout stage.

=== Tiebreakers ===
The teams were ranked according to points (3 points for a win, 1 point for a draw, 0 points for a loss). If tied on points, tiebreakers were applied in the following order (Regulations III. 20 & 21):

1. Points in head-to-head matches among tied teams;
2. Goal difference in head-to-head matches among tied teams;
3. Goals scored in head-to-head matches among tied teams;
4. Away goals scored in head-to-head matches among tied teams;
5. If more than two teams were tied, and after applying all head-to-head criteria above, a subset of teams were still tied, all head-to-head criteria above were reapplied exclusively to this subset of teams;
6. Goal difference in all group matches;
7. Goals scored in all group matches;
8. Away goals scored in all group matches;
9. Drawing of lots.

== Schedule ==
The schedule of each matchday was as follows.

Matchday	Dates	Matches
Matchday 1	12 February 2023	Team 1 vs. Team 4, Team 2 vs. Team 3
Matchday 2	19 February 2023	Team 3 vs. Team 1, Team 4 vs. Team 2
Matchday 3	26 February 2023	Team 4 vs. Team 3, Team 1 vs. Team 2
Matchday 4	8 March 2023	Team 3 vs. Team 4, Team 2 vs. Team 1
Matchday 5	19 March 2023	Team 4 vs. Team 1, Team 3 vs. Team 2
Matchday 6	2 April 2023	Team 1 vs. Team 3, Team 2 vs. Team 4

== Groups ==
Times were local.

=== Group A ===
Pos	Team	Pld	W	D	L	GF	GA	GD	Pts	Qualification	MAG	USM	LUP	AKH
1	(South Africa) Marumo Gallants	6	4	0	2	12	10	+2	12	Advance to knockout stage	—	2–0	3–2	4–1
2	(Algeria) USM Alger	6	3	2	1	11	5	+6	11	Advance to knockout stage	2–0	—	3–0	4–1
3	(Democratic Republic of the Congo) Saint-Éloi Lupopo	6	1	2	3	6	10	−4	5 (Note: Head-to-head points: Saint-Éloi Lupopo 4, Al Akhdar 1)		1–2	1–1	—	1–0
4	(Libya) Al Akhdar	6	1	2	3	8	12	−4	5		4–1	1–1	1–1	—

Source: CAF
Rules for classification: Group stage tiebreakers
Notes:
12 February 2023
15:00 UTC+2

Marumo Gallants (South Africa)	4–1	(Libya) Al Akhdar
Nku 5'; Chivaviro 21', 57'; Malongoane 85'	Report	Alzawi 80'

Dobsonville Stadium, Johannesburg
Referee: Sabri Mohamed Fadul (Sudan)
12 February 2023
20:00 UTC+1

USM Alger (Algeria)	3–0	(Democratic Republic of the Congo) Saint-Éloi Lupopo
Bousseliou 7', 65'; Mahious 82'	Report

Stade du 5 Juillet, Algiers
Referee: Jean Ouattara (Burkina Faso)

19 February 2023
15:00 UTC+2

Saint-Éloi Lupopo (Democratic Republic of the Congo)	1–2	(South Africa) Marumo Gallants
Kabangu 82'	Report	Mvelase 24'; Chivaviro 42'

Levy Mwanawasa Stadium, Ndola (Zambia)
Referee: Bakary Gassama (Gambia)
19 February 2023
18:00 UTC+2

Al Akhdar (Libya)	1–1	(Algeria) USM Alger
Shafshuf 67' (pen.)	Report	Orebonye 77'

Benina Martyrs Stadium, Benghazi
Referee: Haythem Guirat (Tunisia)

26 February 2023
15:00 UTC+2

Saint-Éloi Lupopo (Democratic Republic of the Congo)	1–0	(Libya) Al Akhdar
Lobota 45+2'	Report

Levy Mwanawasa Stadium, Ndola (Zambia)
Referee: Issa Sy (Senegal)
26 February 2023
20:00 UTC+1

USM Alger (Algeria)	2–0	(South Africa) Marumo Gallants
Meziane 39'; Belaïd 89'	Report

Stade du 5 Juillet, Algiers
Referee: Alhadi Allaou Mahamat (Chad)

8 March 2023
15:00 UTC+2

Marumo Gallants (South Africa)	2–0	(Algeria) USM Alger
Nku 7'; Koapeng 75'	Report

Dobsonville Stadium, Johannesburg
Referee: Samuel Uwikunda (Rwanda)
8 March 2023
18:00 UTC+2

Al Akhdar (Libya)	1–1	(Democratic Republic of the Congo) Saint-Éloi Lupopo
Boakye 90+1'	Report	Mwaku 15'

Benina Martyrs Stadium, Benghazi
Referee: Jean Philippe Vlei Patrick Tanguy (Ivory Coast)

19 March 2023
15:00 UTC+2

Saint-Éloi Lupopo (Democratic Republic of the Congo)	1–1	(Algeria) USM Alger
Mwaku 72'	Report	Kateregga 90' (o.g.)

Levy Mwanawasa Stadium, Ndola (Zambia)
Referee: Patrice Milazare (Mauritius)
19 March 2023
19:00 UTC+2

Al Akhdar (Libya)	4–1	(South Africa) Marumo Gallants
Abd Alraheem 31'; Papel 50', 66'; Makkari 73'	Report	Mvelase 61'

Benina Martyrs Stadium, Benghazi
Referee: Abdulkadir Artan (Somalia)

2 April 2023
21:00 UTC+1

USM Alger (Algeria)	4–1	(Libya) Al Akhdar
Belaïd 9' (pen.); Alilet 20' (pen.), 75'; Mahious 36'	Report	Shafshuf 65'

Stade du 5 Juillet, Algiers
Referee: Mahmoud El Banna (Egypt)
2 April 2023
22:00 UTC+2

Marumo Gallants (South Africa)	3–2	(Democratic Republic of the Congo) Saint-Éloi Lupopo
Sibeko 70'; Chivaviro 73'; Mosemaedi 75'	Report	Kateregga 23'; Mwaku 45'

Dobsonville Stadium, Johannesburg
Referee: Redouane Jiyed (Morocco)

=== Group B ===
Pos	Team	Pld	W	D	L	GF	GA	GD	Pts	Qualification	ASE	RIV	DBL	DCM
1	(Ivory Coast) ASEC Mimosas	6	4	1	1	6	4	+2	13	Advance to knockout stage	—	1–0	2–0	0–0
2	(Nigeria) Rivers United	6	3	1	2	9	7	+2	10	Advance to knockout stage	3–0	—	2–2	3–1
3	(Republic of the Congo) Diables Noirs	6	1	3	2	5	5	0	6		0–1	3–0	—	0–0
4	(Democratic Republic of the Congo) Motema Pembe	6	0	3	3	2	6	−4	3		1–2	0–1	0–0	—

Source: CAF
Rules for classification: Group stage tiebreakers
12 February 2023
16:00 UTC+0

ASEC Mimosas (Ivory Coast)	0–0	(Democratic Republic of the Congo) Motema Pembe
	Report

Stade de Yamoussoukro, Yamoussoukro
Referee: Peter Waweru (Kenya)
12 February 2023
17:00 UTC+1

Diables Noirs (Republic of the Congo)	3–0	(Nigeria) Rivers United
Wunda 30'; Ngombe 32'; Massoumou 37' (pen.)	Report

Stade Alphonse Massemba-Débat, Brazzaville
Referee: Hassan Mohamed Hagi (Somalia)

19 February 2023
17:00 UTC+1

Rivers United (Nigeria)	3–0	(Ivory Coast) ASEC Mimosas
Ohawume 1'; Williams 42'; Ndassi 48'	Report

Godswill Akpabio International Stadium, Uyo
Referee: Samir Guezzaz (Morocco)
19 February 2023
20:00 UTC+1

Motema Pembe (Democratic Republic of the Congo)	0–0	(Republic of the Congo) Diables Noirs
	Report

Estádio 11 de Novembro, Luanda (Angola)
Referee: Maguette Ndiaye (Senegal)

26 February 2023
16:00 UTC+0

ASEC Mimosas (Ivory Coast)	2–0	(Republic of the Congo) Diables Noirs
Karamoko 65'; Kouamé 75'	Report

Stade de Yamoussoukro, Yamoussoukro
Referee: Mutaz Ibrahim (Libya)
26 February 2023
20:00 UTC+1

Motema Pembe (Democratic Republic of the Congo)	0–1	(Nigeria) Rivers United
	Report	Acquah 53'

Estádio 11 de Novembro, Luanda (Angola)
Referee: Mohamed Hussein (Egypt)

8 March 2023
20:00 UTC+1

Diables Noirs (Republic of the Congo)	0–1	(Ivory Coast) ASEC Mimosas
	Report	Kouamé 59'

Stade Alphonse Massemba-Débat, Brazzaville
Referee: Haythem Guirat (Tunisia)
9 March 2023 (Note: The Rivers United v Motema Pembe match, originally scheduled to be played on 8 March 2023, was rescheduled to be played on 9 March 2023 due to Motema Pembe's late arrival to Nigeria for travel problems.)
15:00 UTC+1

Rivers United (Nigeria)	3–1	(Democratic Republic of the Congo) Motema Pembe
Acquah 45+2', 56', 90+3'	Report	Yallet 78'

Godswill Akpabio International Stadium, Uyo
Referee: Jean Ouattara (Burkina Faso)

19 March 2023
17:00 UTC+1

Rivers United (Nigeria)	2–2	(Republic of the Congo) Diables Noirs
Nwagua 73', 77'	Report	Ampiah 28' (o.g.); Bassinga 81'

Godswill Akpabio International Stadium, Uyo
Referee: Karim Sabry (Morocco)
19 March 2023
20:00 UTC+1

Motema Pembe (Democratic Republic of the Congo)	1–2	(Ivory Coast) ASEC Mimosas
Yallet 52'	Report	Kouamé 27', 90'

Estádio 11 de Novembro, Luanda (Angola)
Referee: Lahlou Benbraham (Algeria)

2 April 2023
16:00 UTC+0

ASEC Mimosas (Ivory Coast)	1–0	(Nigeria) Rivers United
Karidioula 2'	Report

Stade de Yamoussoukro, Yamoussoukro
Referee: Djindo Louis Houngnandande (Benin)
2 April 2023
17:00 UTC+1

Diables Noirs (Republic of the Congo)	0–0	(Democratic Republic of the Congo) Motema Pembe
	Report

Stade Alphonse Massemba-Débat, Brazzaville
Referee: Alhadi Allaou Mahamat (Chad)

=== Group C ===
Pos	Team	Pld	W	D	L	GF	GA	GD	Pts	Qualification	FAR	PFC	ASK	FUT
1	(Morocco) ASFAR	6	4	2	0	14	4	+10	14	Advance to knockout stage	—	1–0	5–1	2–0
2	(Egypt) Pyramids	6	3	2	1	11	5	+6	11	Advance to knockout stage	2–2	—	1–0	3–0 (Note: Awarded)
3	(Togo) ASKO Kara	6	1	1	4	6	14	−8	4 (Note: Head-to-head points: ASKO Kara 3, Future 3. Head-to-head goal difference: ASKO Kara 0, Future 0. Head-to-head goals scored: ASKO Kara 3, Future 3. Head-to-head away goals scored: ASKO Kara 3, Future 3. Goal difference: ASKO Kara -8, Future -8. Goals scored: ASKO Kara 6, Future 4)		1–1	1–4	—	0–3 (Note: Awarded)
4	(Egypt) Future	6	1	1	4	4	12	−8	4		0–3 (Note: Awarded)	1–1	0–3 (Note: Awarded)	—

Source: CAF
Rules for classification: Group stage tiebreakers
Notes:
12 February 2023
16:00 UTC+0

ASKO Kara (Togo)	0–3 Awarded (Note: CAF awarded Future a 3–0 win as a result of ASKO Kara the illegal fielding the player Kangnivi Ama Tchoutchoui. The match originally ended 1–1.)	(Egypt) Future
Tchoutchoui 3'	Report	Farouk 81'

Stade de Kégué, Lomé
Referee: Alhadi Allaou Mahamat (Chad)
12 February 2023
21:00 UTC+2

Pyramids (Egypt)	2–2	(Morocco) ASFAR
Fathi 1'; El Said 75'	Report	Diney 25'; Sahd 73'

30 June Stadium, Cairo
Referee: Mutaz Ibrahim (Libya)

19 February 2023
18:00 UTC+2

Future (Egypt)	1–1	(Egypt) Pyramids
Mohamed 53'	Report	Hamdy 7'

Al Ahly WE Al Salam Stadium, Cairo
Referee: Mustapha Ghorbal (Algeria)
19 February 2023
20:00 UTC+1

ASFAR (Morocco)	5–1	(Togo) ASKO Kara
Hrimat 39'; Hammoudan 50'; Igamane 63'; Sahd 67'; Fati 90+2'	Report	Ouro-Bodi 16'

Prince Moulay Abdellah Stadium, Rabat
Referee: Pierre Atcho (Gabon)

26 February 2023
18:00 UTC+2

Pyramids (Egypt)	1–0	(Togo) ASKO Kara
Ben Youssef 28'	Report

30 June Stadium, Cairo
Referee: Messie Jessie Oved Nkounkou (Congo)
26 February 2023
20:00 UTC+1

ASFAR (Morocco)	2–0	(Egypt) Future
Igamane 30'; Diakite 90'	Report

Prince Moulay Abdellah Stadium, Rabat
Attendance: 27,192
Referee: Jean Jacques Ndala Ngambo (DR Congo)

8 March 2023
16:00 UTC+0

ASKO Kara (Togo)	1–4	(Egypt) Pyramids
Tchoutchoui 66'	Report	Ben Youssef 3'; Fathi 26', 36'; Issa 64'

Stade de Kégué, Lomé
Referee: Celso Armindo Alvação (Mozambique)
8 March 2023
21:00 UTC+2

Future (Egypt)	0–3 Awarded (Note: Due to a mistake in Ahmed Refaat registration, Future was ruled forfeited in all matches in which this player participated.)	(Morocco) ASFAR
Mohsen 10' (pen.); Essaoubi 50' (o.g.)	Report

Al Ahly WE Al Salam Stadium, Cairo
Referee: Abongile Tom (South Africa)

19 March 2023
18:00 UTC+2

Future (Egypt)	0–3 Awarded	(Togo) ASKO Kara
Elfil 41'; Lasheen 72'; Atef 87'	Report

Al Ahly WE Al Salam Stadium, Cairo
Referee: Lamin Jammeh (Gambia)
19 March 2023
19:00 UTC+0

ASFAR (Morocco)	1–0	(Egypt) Pyramids
Hammoudan 61'	Report

Prince Moulay Abdellah Stadium, Rabat
Referee: Daniel Nii Laryea (Ghana)

2 April 2023
22:00 UTC+2

Pyramids (Egypt)	3–0 Awarded	(Egypt) Future
Gabr 15'; El Said 52'	Report	Atef 90+3'

30 June Stadium, Cairo
Referee: Issa Sy (Senegal)
2 April 2023
20:00 UTC+0

ASKO Kara (Togo)	1–1	(Morocco) ASFAR
Yeré 24'	Report	Diney 40'

Stade de Kégué, Lomé
Referee: Joshua Bondo (Botswana)

=== Group D ===
Pos	Team	Pld	W	D	L	GF	GA	GD	Pts	Qualification	YNG	USM	ASR	TPM
1	(Tanzania) Young Africans	6	4	1	1	9	4	+5	13 (Note: Overall goal difference: Young Africans +5, US Monastir +4)	Advance to knockout stage	—	2–0	2–0	3–1
2	(Tunisia) US Monastir	6	4	1	1	8	4	+4	13	Advance to knockout stage	2–0	—	2–1	1–0
3	(Mali) Real Bamako	6	1	2	3	6	10	−4	5		1–1	1–1	—	2–1
4	(Democratic Republic of the Congo) TP Mazembe	6	1	0	5	5	10	−5	3		0–1	0–2	3–1	—

Source: CAF
Rules for classification: Group stage tiebreakers
Notes:
12 February 2023
15:00 UTC+2

TP Mazembe (Democratic Republic of the Congo)	3–1	(Mali) Real Bamako
Kitambala 24'; Ngonga 38'; Mwamba 90+4'	Report	S. Coulibaly 31'

Stade TP Mazembe, Lubumbashi
Referee: Celso Armindo Alvação (Mozambique)
12 February 2023
17:00 UTC+1

US Monastir (Tunisia)	2–0	(Tanzania) Young Africans
Saghraoui 10'; Traoré 16'	Report

Stade Hammadi Agrebi, Tunis (Note: US Monastir played their group stage home matches at Stade Hammadi Agrebi, Tunis, instead of their regular home stadium Stade Mustapha Ben Jannet, Monastir, which did not meet CAF requirements.)
Referee: Djindo Louis Houngnandande (Benin)

19 February 2023
19:00 UTC+3

Young Africans (Tanzania)	3–1	(Democratic Republic of the Congo) TP Mazembe
Musonda 7'; Yahya 11'; Kisinda 90+2'	Report	Ngonga 80'

National Stadium, Dar es Salaam
Referee: Abdel Aziz Mohamed Bouh (Mauritania)
19 February 2023
16:00 UTC+0

Real Bamako (Mali)	1–1	(Tunisia) US Monastir
Samabaly 48'	Report	Aloui 77'

Stade du 26 Mars, Bamako
Referee: Jean Philippe Vlei Patrick Tanguy (DR Congo)

26 February 2023
15:00 UTC+2

TP Mazembe (Democratic Republic of the Congo)	0–2	(Tunisia) US Monastir
	Report	Traoré 51'; Aloui 90+3'

Stade TP Mazembe, Lubumbashi
Referee: Patrice Milazare (Mauritius)
26 February 2023
16:00 UTC+0

Real Bamako (Mali)	1–1	(Tanzania) Young Africans
Koné 90+1'	Report	Mayele 60'

Stade du 26 Mars, Bamako
Referee: Joshua Bondo (Botswana)

8 March 2023
14:00 UTC+1

US Monastir (Tunisia)	1–0	(Democratic Republic of the Congo) TP Mazembe
Traoré 3'	Report

Stade Hammadi Agrebi, Tunis
Referee: Maguette Ndiaye (Senegal)
8 March 2023
19:00 UTC+3

Young Africans (Tanzania)	2–0	(Mali) Real Bamako
Mayele 8'; Moloko 68'	Report

National Stadium, Dar es Salaam
Referee: Mustapha Ghorbal (Algeria)

19 March 2023
16:00 UTC+0

Real Bamako (Mali)	2–1	(Democratic Republic of the Congo) TP Mazembe
Kamissoko 45+2', 61'	Report	Traoré 67'

Stade du 26 Mars, Bamako
Referee: Amin Omar (Egypt)
19 March 2023
19:00 UTC+3

Young Africans (Tanzania)	2–0	(Tunisia) US Monastir
Musonda 33'; Mayele 59'	Report

National Stadium, Dar es Salaam
Referee: Alhadi Allaou Mahamat (Chad)

2 April 2023
15:00 UTC+2

TP Mazembe (Democratic Republic of the Congo)	0–1	(Tanzania) Young Africans
	Report	Mussa 63'

Stade TP Mazembe, Lubumbashi
Referee: Lahlou Benbraham (Algeria)
2 April 2023
21:00 UTC+1

US Monastir (Tunisia)	2–1	(Mali) Real Bamako
Harrabi 35'; Amokrane 90+3'	Report	Samabaly 44'

Stade Hammadi Agrebi, Tunis
Referee: Mahmood Ismail (Sudan)
