= Kateregga =

Kateregga is both a given name and a surname. Notable people with the name include:

- Kateregga Kamegere, Kabaka of Buganda
- Allan Kateregga (born 1994), Ugandan footballer
- Badru Kateregga (born 1948), Ugandan academic
- Godfrey Kateregga (1960–1999), Ugandan footballer
