= 2022–23 CAF Confederation Cup =

International football competition in Africa

2022–23 TotalEnergies CAF Confederation Cup
- Stade du 5 Juillet in Algiers, Algeria hosted the final.

Tournament details
- Dates: Qualifying: 9 September – 9 November 2022; Competition proper: 12 February – 3 June 2023
- Teams: Competition proper: 16; Total: 50+16 (from 39 associations)

Final positions
- Champions: (Algeria) USM Alger (1st title)
- Runners-up: (Tanzania) Young Africans

Tournament statistics
- Matches played: 62
- Goals scored: 147 (2.37 per match)
- Top scorer(s): (Democratic Republic of the Congo) Fiston Mayele (7 goals)
- (Note: All statistics do not include qualifying play-offs)

The 2022–23 CAF Confederation Cup, officially the 2022–23 TotalEnergies CAF Confederation Cup for sponsorship purposes, was the 20th season of the CAF Confederation Cup and 48th overall season of Africa's secondary club football tournament organized by the Confederation of African Football (CAF).

RS Berkane were the defending champions, but were eliminated in the playoff round by US Monastir. USM Alger won this edition and as such qualified automatically for the next season and earned the right to play against the winners of the 2022–23 CAF Champions League in the 2023 CAF Super Cup.

== Association team allocation ==
All 56 CAF member associations may enter the CAF Confederation Cup, with the 12 highest ranked associations according to their CAF 5-year ranking eligible to enter two teams in the competition. As a result, theoretically a maximum of 68 teams could enter the tournament (plus 16 teams eliminated from the CAF Champions League which enter the play-off round) – although this level has never been reached.

For this season's edition, CAF uses the 2017–2022 CAF 5-year ranking, which calculates points for each entrant association based on their clubs’ performance over those 5 years in the CAF club competitions. The criteria for points are as follows:

	CAF Champions League	CAF Confederation Cup
Winners	6 points	5 points
Runners-up	5 points	4 points
Losing semi-finalists	4 points	3 points
Losing quarter-finalists (from 2017)	3 points	2 points
3rd place in groups	2 points	1 point
4th place in groups	1 point	0.5 point

The points are multiplied by a coefficient according to the year as follows:

- 2021–22: x 5
- 2020–21: × 4
- 2019–20: × 3
- 2018–19: × 2
- 2018: × 1

== Teams ==
The following 50 teams from 39 associations entered the competition.

- Teams in **bold** received a bye to the second round.
- The other teams entered the first round.

Associations are shown according to their 2018–2022 CAF 5-year ranking – those with a ranking score have their rank and score (in parentheses) indicated.

Associations eligible to enter two teams (Top 12 associations)
Association	Rank (Pts)	Team	Qualifying method
Morocco	1 (194)	**RS Berkane**	Title holders (2021–22 CAF Confederation Cup winners)
Morocco	1 (194)	ASFAR	2021–22 Botola third place
Egypt	2 (176)	Future	2021–22 Egyptian Premier League third place after 24 rounds
Egypt	2 (176)	**Pyramids**	2021–22 Egyptian Premier League fourth place after 24 rounds
Algeria	3 (115)	**JS Saoura**	2021–22 Algerian Ligue Professionnelle 1 third place
Algeria	3 (115)	**USM Alger**	2021–22 Algerian Ligue Professionnelle 1 fourth place
Tunisia	4 (113)	**Club Sfaxien**	2021–22 Tunisian Ligue Professionnelle 1 third place
Tunisia	4 (113)	**Club Africain**	2021–22 Tunisian Ligue Professionnelle 1 fourth place
South Africa	5 (109.5)	Royal AM	2021–22 South African Premiership third place
South Africa	5 (109.5)	**Marumo Gallants**	2021–22 Nedbank Cup runners-up
DR Congo	6 (63)	Saint-Éloi Lupopo	2021–22 Linafoot third place
DR Congo	6 (63)	**Motema Pembe**	2021–22 Coupe du Congo winners
Angola	7 (46)	**Sagrada Esperança**	2021–22 Girabola third place
Sudan	8 (33.5)	Hilal Alsahil	2021–22 Sudan Premier League third place
Sudan	8 (33.5)	Al Ahli Khartoum	2021–22 Sudan Cup runners-up
Libya	9 (33)	Al Akhdar	2021–22 Libyan Premier League third place
Libya	9 (33)	**Al Nasr**	2021–22 Libyan Premier League fourth place
Guinea	10 (31)	Milo	2021–22 Guinée Championnat National third place
Guinea	10 (31)	Ashanti Golden Boys	2021–22 Guinée Championnat National fourth place
Tanzania	11 (30.5)	**Azam**	2021–22 Tanzanian Premier League third place
Tanzania	11 (30.5)	Geita Gold	2021–22 Tanzanian Premier League fourth place
Nigeria	12 (26)	Remo Stars	2021–22 Nigeria Professional Football League third place
Nigeria	12 (26)	Kwara United	2021–22 Nigeria Professional Football League fourth place

Associations eligible to enter one team
Association	Rank (Pts)	Team	Qualifying method
Zambia	13 (24.5)	**ZESCO United**	2021–22 Zambian Super League runners-up
Cameroon	14 (14.5)	PWD Bamenda	2021–22 Cameroon Cup winners
Ivory Coast	16 (10.5)	Gagnoa	2021–22 Côte d'Ivoire Ligue 1 runners-up
Congo	17 (8)	**Diables Noirs**	2021–22 Coupe du Congo winners
Botswana	18 (6)	Security Systems	2021–22 Botswana FA Cup runners-up
Eswatini	21 (3.5)	Mbabane Highlanders	2021–22 Eswatini Premier League runners-up
Mali	21 (3.5)	Real Bamako	2021–22 Malian Cup runners-up
Burkina Faso	23 (3)	Douanes de Ouagadougou	2021–22 Coupe du Faso winners
Niger	24 (2.5)	Douanes de Niamey	2021–22 Niger Cup winners
Ghana	24 (2.5)	**Hearts of Oak**	2021–22 Ghana FA Cup winners
Rwanda	26 (2)	Kigali	2021–22 Rwandan Cup winners
Uganda	26 (2)	Bul	2021–22 Uganda Cup winners
Mauritania	28 (1.5)	Nouakchott Kings	2021–22 Coupe du Président de la République winners
Benin	28 (1.5)	Buffles du Borgou	2021–22 Benin Premier League runners-up
Mozambique	30 (1)	Ferroviário da Beira	2021 Moçambola runners-up
Togo	30 (3)	ASC Kara	2021–22 Togolese Championnat National runners-up
Burundi	—	Bumamuru	2021–22 Burundian Cup winners
Chad	—	AS Santé d'Abéché	2021–22 Chad Premier League runners-up
Djibouti	—	ASAS Télécom	2021–22 Djibouti Cup runners-up
Equatorial Guinea	—	Inter de Litoral Academy	2021–22 Equatoguinean Cup Región Continental winners
Ethiopia	—	Fasil Kenema	2021–22 Ethiopian Premier League runners-up
Liberia	—	LISCR	2021–22 Liberia Cup winners
Madagascar	—	Elgeco Plus	2021–22 Madagascar Cup winners
Seychelles	—	St Michel United	2021–22 Seychelles Premier League runners-up
Sierra Leone	—	Kallon	2021–22 Sierra Leone Premier League fifth place
South Sudan	—	Al Hilal Wau	2021–22 South Sudan National Cup winners
Zanzibar	—	Kipanga	2021–22 Zanzibari Cup winners

Associations which did not enter a team

- Senegal
- Kenya
- Zimbabwe
- Cape Verde
- Central African Republic
- Comoros
- Eritrea
- Gabon
- Gambia
- Guinea-Bissau
- Lesotho
- Malawi
- Mauritius
- Namibia
- Réunion
- São Tomé and Príncipe
- Somalia

Notes:

1. Egypt (EGY):The 2021–22 Egyptian Premier League was not finished by the CAF deadline. As a result, the Egyptian Football Association announced that Zamalek and Al Ahly, who were at first and second place after 24 rounds respectively, represented Egypt in the 2022–23 CAF Champions League. Meanwhile, Future and Pyramids FC, who were at third and fourth place after 24 rounds respectively, represented Egypt in the 2022–23 CAF Confederation Cup.

== Schedule ==
Schedule for 2022–23 CAF Confederation Cup
Phase	Round	Draw date	First leg	Second leg
Qualifying	First round	9 August 2022	9–11 September 2022	16–18 September 2022
Qualifying	Second round	9 August 2022	7–9 October 2022	14–16 October 2022
Qualifying	Playoff round	18 October 2022	2 November 2022	9 November 2022
Group stage	Matchday 1	12 December 2022	12 February 2023	
Group stage	Matchday 2	12 December 2022	19 February 2023	
Group stage	Matchday 3	12 December 2022	26 February 2023	
Group stage	Matchday 4	12 December 2022	8 March 2023	
Group stage	Matchday 5	12 December 2022	19 March 2023	
Group stage	Matchday 6	12 December 2022	2 April 2023	
Knockout stage	Quarter-finals	5 April 2023	23 April 2023	30 April 2023
Knockout stage	Semi-finals	5 April 2023	10 May 2023	17 May 2023
Knockout stage	Final	5 April 2023	28 May 2023	3 June 2023

== Qualifying rounds ==
The draw for the qualifying rounds was held on 9 August 2022 at the CAF headquarters in Cairo, Egypt. In the qualifying rounds, each tie was played on a home-and-away two-legged basis. If the aggregate score was tied after the second leg, the away goals rule was applied. If the scores were still tied, extra time was not played, and a penalty shoot-out was used to determine the winner (Regulations III. 13 & 14).

=== First round ===
Team 1	Agg.	Team 2	1st leg	2nd leg
Kwara United (Nigeria)	3–0	(Niger) Douanes de Niamey	3–0	0–0
LISCR (Liberia)	1–3	(Ivory Coast) Gagnoa	0–0	1–3
Milo (Guinea)	2–4	(Togo) ASC Kara	2–1	0–3
Douanes de Ouagadougou (Burkina Faso)	0–0 (1–3 p)	(Mali) Real Bamako	0–0	0–0
Hilal Alsahil (Sudan)	2–2 (a)	(Tanzania) Geita Gold	1–0	1–2
Fasil Kenema (Ethiopia)	3–1	(Burundi) Bumamuru	3–0	0–1
ASAS Télécom (Djibouti)	0–1	(Rwanda) Kigali	0–0	0–1
Al Hilal Wau (South Sudan)	2–2 (3–4 p)	(Zanzibar) Kipanga	1–1	1–1
Al Akhdar (Libya)	3–0	(Sudan) Al Ahli Khartoum	3–0	0–0
Mbabane Highlanders (Eswatini)	0–2	(South Africa) Royal AM	0–0	0–2
Security Systems (Botswana)	w/o (Note: Saint-Éloi Lupopo won on a walkover after Security Systems withdrew from the competition citing financial reasons.)	(Democratic Republic of the Congo) Saint-Éloi Lupopo	—	—
St Michel United (Seychelles)	w/o (Note: St Michel United won on a walkover after Inter de Litoral Academy failed to appear for the first leg.)	(Equatorial Guinea) Inter de Litoral Academy	—	—
AS Santé d'Abéché (Chad)	1–3	(Mozambique) Ferroviário da Beira	1–2	0–1
PWD Bamenda (Cameroon)	1–2	(Madagascar) Elgeco Plus	1–1	0–1
ASFAR (Morocco)	2–1	(Nigeria) Remo Stars	1–1	1–0
Ashanti Golden Boys (Guinea)	2–1	(Mauritania) Nouakchott Kings	2–0	0–1
Buffles du Borgou (Benin)	0–4	(Sierra Leone) Kallon	0–1	0–3
Bul (Uganda)	0–1	(Egypt) Future	0–0	0–1

=== Second round ===
Team 1	Agg.	Team 2	1st leg	2nd leg
Kwara United (Nigeria)	3–3 (a)	(Morocco) RS Berkane	3–1	0–2
Gagnoa (Ivory Coast)	1–0	(Algeria) JS Saoura	1–0	0–0
ASC Kara (Togo)	1–4	(Algeria) USM Alger	0–2	1–2
Real Bamako (Mali)	3–1	(Ghana) Hearts of Oak	3–0	0–1
Hilal Alsahil (Sudan)	0–9	(Egypt) Pyramids	0–2	0–7
Fasil Kenema (Ethiopia)	0–1	(Tunisia) Club Sfaxien	0–0	0–1
Kigali (Rwanda)	0–1	(Libya) Al Nasr	0–0	0–1
Kipanga (Zanzibar)	0–7	(Tunisia) Club Africain	0–0	0–7
Al Akhdar (Libya)	3–2	(Tanzania) Azam	3–0	0–2
Royal AM (South Africa)	1–1 (a)	(Zambia) ZESCO United	0–0	1–1
Saint-Éloi Lupopo (Democratic Republic of the Congo)	2–0	(Angola) Sagrada Esperança	2–0	0–0
St Michel United (Seychelles)	1–2	(Democratic Republic of the Congo) Motema Pembe	1–0	0–2
Ferroviário da Beira (Mozambique)	2–4	(Republic of the Congo) Diables Noirs	2–1	0–3
Elgeco Plus (Madagascar)	1–4	(South Africa) Marumo Gallants	1–3	0–1
ASFAR (Morocco)	5–0	(Guinea) Ashanti Golden Boys	4–0	1–0
Kallon (Sierra Leone)	0–6	(Egypt) Future	0–2	0–4

=== Playoff round ===
The 16 winners of the second round advanced to the playoff round, where they were joined by the 16 losers of the Champions League second round.

Team 1	Agg.	Team 2	1st leg	2nd leg
Rail Club du Kadiogo (Burkina Faso)	0–2	(Democratic Republic of the Congo) Saint-Éloi Lupopo	0–1	0–1
Royal Leopards (Eswatini)	2–4	(Mali) Real Bamako	1–1	1–3
TP Mazembe (Democratic Republic of the Congo)	3–0	(South Africa) Royal AM	2–0	1–0
1º de Agosto (Angola)	2–2 (2–3 p)	(Egypt) Future	1–1	1–1
ASEC Mimosas (Ivory Coast)	5–2	(Ivory Coast) Gagnoa	2–0	3–2
Djoliba (Mali)	0–4	(Morocco) ASFAR	0–0	0–4
Al Ahli Tripoli (Libya)	1–3	(South Africa) Marumo Gallants	1–0	0–3
ASKO Kara (Togo)	2–1	(Tunisia) Club Sfaxien	2–1	0–0
Young Africans (Tanzania)	1–0	(Tunisia) Club Africain	0–0	1–0
Flambeau du Centre (Burundi)	1–4	(Democratic Republic of the Congo) Motema Pembe	0–2	1–2
Rivers United (Nigeria)	6–1	(Libya) Al Nasr	5–0	1–1
US Monastir (Tunisia)	1–0	(Morocco) RS Berkane	1–0	0–0
Cape Town City (South Africa)	0–1	(Algeria) USM Alger	0–0	0–1
ASN Nigelec (Niger)	1–3	(Egypt) Pyramids	1–0	0–3
La Passe (Seychelles)	2–6	(Republic of the Congo) Diables Noirs	0–2	2–4
Plateau United (Nigeria)	4–4 (a)	(Libya) Al Akhdar	4–1	0–3

== Group stage ==
Location of teams of the 2022–23 CAF Confederation Cup group stage.
Brown: Group A; Red: Group B; Orange: Group C; Yellow: Group D.

The draw for the group stage was held on 12 December 2022, 11:00 GMT (13:00 local time, UTC+2), at the CAF headquarters in Cairo, Egypt. The 16 winners of the playoff round of qualifying were drawn into four groups of four.

The teams were seeded by their performances in the CAF competitions for the previous five seasons (CAF 5-year ranking points shown next to every team). Each group contained one team from each of Pot 1, Pot 2, Pot 3, and Pot 4, and each team was allocated to the positions in their group according to their pot.

Pot	Pot 1	Pot 2
Teams	(Democratic Republic of the Congo) TP Mazembe (43 pts); (Egypt) Pyramids (34 pts); (Ivory Coast) ASEC Mimosas (8 pts); (Algeria) USM Alger (5 pts)	(Democratic Republic of the Congo) Motema Pembe (3 pts); (Tanzania) Young Africans (0.5 pts); (Republic of the Congo) Diables Noirs; (Democratic Republic of the Congo) Saint-Éloi Lupopo; (Egypt) Future; (Libya) Al Akhdar; (Mali) Real Bamako; (Morocco) ASFAR; (Nigeria) Rivers United; (South Africa) Marumo Gallants; (Togo) ASKO Kara; (Tunisia) US Monastir

In the group stage, each group was played on a home-and-away round-robin basis. The winners and runners-up of each group advanced to the quarter-finals of the knockout stage.

Tiebreakers
The teams were ranked according to points (3 points for a win, 1 point for a draw, 0 points for a loss). If tied on points, tiebreakers were applied in the following order (Regulations III. 20 & 21):
1. Points in head-to-head matches among tied teams;
2. Goal difference in head-to-head matches among tied teams;
3. Goals scored in head-to-head matches among tied teams;
4. Away goals scored in head-to-head matches among tied teams;
5. If more than two teams were tied, and after applying all head-to-head criteria above, a subset of teams were still tied, all head-to-head criteria above were reapplied exclusively to this subset of teams;
6. Goal difference in all group matches;
7. Goals scored in all group matches;
8. Away goals scored in all group matches;
9. Drawing of lots.

=== Group A ===
Pos	Team	Pld	W	D	L	GF	GA	GD	Pts	Qualification	MAG	USM	LUP	AKH
1	(South Africa) Marumo Gallants	6	4	0	2	12	10	+2	12	Advance to knockout stage	—	2–0	3–2	4–1
2	(Algeria) USM Alger	6	3	2	1	11	5	+6	11	Advance to knockout stage	2–0	—	3–0	4–1
3	(Democratic Republic of the Congo) Saint-Éloi Lupopo	6	1	2	3	6	10	−4	5 (Note: Head-to-head points: Saint-Éloi Lupopo 4, Al Akhdar 1)		1–2	1–1	—	1–0
4	(Libya) Al Akhdar	6	1	2	3	8	12	−4	5		4–1	1–1	1–1	—

Source: CAF

=== Group B ===
Pos	Team	Pld	W	D	L	GF	GA	GD	Pts	Qualification	ASE	RIV	DBL	DCM
1	(Ivory Coast) ASEC Mimosas	6	4	1	1	6	4	+2	13	Advance to knockout stage	—	1–0	2–0	0–0
2	(Nigeria) Rivers United	6	3	1	2	9	7	+2	10	Advance to knockout stage	3–0	—	2–2	3–1
3	(Republic of the Congo) Diables Noirs	6	1	3	2	5	5	0	6		0–1	3–0	—	0–0
4	(Democratic Republic of the Congo) Motema Pembe	6	0	3	3	2	6	−4	3		1–2	0–1	0–0	—

Source: CAF

=== Group C ===
Pos	Team	Pld	W	D	L	GF	GA	GD	Pts	Qualification	FAR	PFC	ASK	FUT
1	(Morocco) ASFAR	6	4	2	0	14	4	+10	14	Advance to knockout stage	—	1–0	5–1	2–0
2	(Egypt) Pyramids	6	3	2	1	11	5	+6	11	Advance to knockout stage	2–2	—	1–0	3–0 (Note: Awarded)
3	(Togo) ASKO Kara	6	1	1	4	6	14	−8	4 (Note: Head-to-head points: ASKO Kara 3, Future 3. Head-to-head goal difference: ASKO Kara 0, Future 0. Head-to-head goals scored: ASKO Kara 3, Future 3. Head-to-head away goals scored: ASKO Kara 3, Future 3. Goal difference: ASKO Kara -8, Future -8. Goals scored: ASKO Kara 6, Future 4)		1–1	1–4	—	0–3 (Note: Awarded)
4	(Egypt) Future	6	1	1	4	4	12	−8	4		0–3 (Note: Awarded)	1–1	0–3 (Note: Awarded)	—

Source: CAF

=== Group D ===
Pos	Team	Pld	W	D	L	GF	GA	GD	Pts	Qualification	YNG	USM	ASR	TPM
1	(Tanzania) Young Africans	6	4	1	1	9	4	+5	13 (Note: Overall goal difference: Young Africans +5, US Monastir +4)	Advance to knockout stage	—	2–0	2–0	3–1
2	(Tunisia) US Monastir	6	4	1	1	8	4	+4	13	Advance to knockout stage	2–0	—	2–1	1–0
3	(Mali) Real Bamako	6	1	2	3	6	10	−4	5		1–1	1–1	—	2–1
4	(Democratic Republic of the Congo) TP Mazembe	6	1	0	5	5	10	−5	3		0–1	0–2	3–1	—

Source: CAF

== Knockout stage ==
The mechanism of the draws for each round was as follows:

- In the draw for the quarter-finals, the four group winners were seeded, and the four group runners-up were unseeded. The seeded teams were drawn against the unseeded teams, with the seeded teams hosting the second leg. Teams from the same group cannot be drawn against each other, while teams from the same association can be drawn against each other.
- In the draws for the semi-finals, there were no seedings, and teams from the same group or the same association could be drawn against each other. As the draws for the quarter-finals and semi-finals were held together before the quarter-finals were played, the identity of the quarter-final winners was not known at the time of the semi-final draw.

Group	Winners	Runners-up
A	(South Africa) Marumo Gallants	(Algeria) USM Alger
B	(Ivory Coast) ASEC Mimosas	(Nigeria) Rivers United
C	(Morocco) ASFAR	(Egypt) Pyramids
D	(Tanzania) Young Africans	(Tunisia) US Monastir

=== Bracket ===
The bracket was decided after the draw for the knockout stage (quarter-finals, semi-finals and final), which was held on 5 April 2023, 18:30 GMT (20:30 local time, UTC+2), at the CAF headquarters in Cairo, Egypt.

Quarter-finals
(Nigeria) Rivers United	0	0	0
(Tanzania) Young Africans	2	0	2
(Egypt) Pyramids	1	0	1
(South Africa) Marumo Gallants	1	1	2
(Tunisia) US Monastir	0	0	0
(Ivory Coast) ASEC Mimosas	0	2	2
(Algeria) USM Alger	2	2	4
(Morocco) ASFAR	0	3	3

Semi-finals
(Tanzania) Young Africans	2	2	4
(South Africa) Marumo Gallants	0	1	1
(Ivory Coast) ASEC Mimosas	0	0	0
(Algeria) USM Alger	0	2	2

Final
(Tanzania) Young Africans	1	1	2
(Algeria) USM Alger (a)	2	0	2

=== Quarter-finals ===
Team 1	Agg.	Team 2	1st leg	2nd leg
Pyramids (Egypt)	1–2	(South Africa) Marumo Gallants	1–1	0–1
US Monastir (Tunisia)	0–2	(Ivory Coast) ASEC Mimosas	0–0	0–2
USM Alger (Algeria)	4–3	(Morocco) ASFAR	2–0	2–3
Rivers United (Nigeria)	0–2	(Tanzania) Young Africans	0–2	0–0

=== Semi-finals ===
Team 1	Agg.	Team 2	1st leg	2nd leg
Young Africans (Tanzania)	4–1	(South Africa) Marumo Gallants	2–0	2–1
ASEC Mimosas (Ivory Coast)	0–2	(Algeria) USM Alger	0–0	0–2

=== Final ===
The first leg was played on 28 May, and the second leg was played on 3 June 2023.

Team 1	Agg.	Team 2	1st leg	2nd leg
Young Africans (Tanzania)	2–2 (a)	(Algeria) USM Alger	1–2	1–0

28 May 2023
16:00 UTC+3

Young Africans (Tanzania)	1–2	(Algeria) USM Alger
Mayele 82'	Report	Mahious 32'; Merili 84'

Benjamin Mkapa Stadium, Dar es Salaam
Attendance: 60,000
Referee: Jean-Jacques Ndala (DR Congo)
3 June 2023
20:00 UTC+1

USM Alger (Algeria)	0–1	(Tanzania) Young Africans
	Report	Shabani 7' (pen.)

Stade du 5 Juillet, Algiers
Attendance: 64,000
Referee: Dahane Beida (Mauritania)

2–2 on aggregate. USM Alger won on away goals.

== Top goalscorers ==
Team eliminated / inactive for this round.

Rank	Player	Team	MD1	MD2	MD3	MD4	MD5	MD6	QF1	QF2	SF1	SF2	F1	F2	Total
1	(Democratic Republic of the Congo) Fiston Mayele	(Tanzania) Young Africans			1	1	1		2			1	1		7
2	(South Africa) Ranga Chivaviro	(South Africa) Marumo Gallants	2	1				1	1			1			6
3	(Ghana) Paul Acquah	(Nigeria) Rivers United			1	3									4
3	(Ivory Coast) Aubin Kramo Kouamé	(Ivory Coast) ASEC Mimosas			1	1	2								4
3	(Algeria) Khaled Bousseliou	(Algeria) USM Alger	2							1		1			4
6	(Mali) Boubacar Traoré	(Tunisia) Union Monastirienne	1		1	1									3
6	(Egypt) Mostafa Fathi	(Egypt) Pyramids	1			2									3
6	(Democratic Republic of the Congo) Malanga Horso Mwaku	(Democratic Republic of the Congo) Saint-Éloi Lupopo				1	1	1							3
6	(Algeria) Zineddine Belaïd	(Algeria) USM Alger			1			1	1						3
6	(Cape Verde) Diney	(Morocco) ASFAR	1					1		1					3
6	(Zambia) Kennedy Musonda	(Tanzania) Young Africans		1			1					1			3

== See also ==
- 2022–23 CAF Champions League
- 2023 CAF Super Cup
