= Mpho Mvelase =

South African soccer player (born 1989)

Personal information
- Date of birth: 6 February 1989 (age 37)
- Positions: Defender; midfielder

Team information
- Current team: TS Galaxy
- Number: 2

Senior career*
Years	Team	Apps	(Gls)
2012–2014	United FC	55	(3)
2014–2015	Chippa United	10	(2)
2015–2017	Orlando Pirates	2	(0)
2017–2018	Chippa United	19	(0)
2018	Royal Eagles	6	(0)
2018–2021	Polokwane City	61	(5)
2021–2023	Marumo Gallants	28	(1)
2023–	TS Galaxy	28	(2)
- * Club domestic league appearances and goals as of 16 August 2024

Mpho Mvelase (born 6 February 1989) is a South African soccer player who plays as a defender and midfielder for TS Galaxy in the South African Premier Division.

He was born in Dobsonville. Following two years in the National First Division with United FC, he joined Chippa United in 2014 and made his first-tier debut in the 2014-15 South African Premier Division. Already during that season, in January 2015, after only ten games (nine start) he was picked up by one of South Africa's big three teams, Orlando Pirates.

He played once in 2015, and only twice in the 2015–16 season—one in the league and one in the Telkom Knockout. It was speculated whether Mvelase would be loaned out. Media noticed that the players signed by Orlando Pirates from Chippa United usually received a similar treatment.

He stayed with Orlando Pirates until February 2017, when he finally left. He rejoined Chippa United as a free agent, initially on a six-month contract. After ending the 2017–18 season with the First Division team Royal Eagles, he moved on to another Premier Division team Polokwane City in the fall of 2018.

During two years in Marumo Gallants, Mvelase played and scored in the 2022–23 CAF Confederation Cup group stage. With Mvelase being named the team's defender of the year in 2022–23, Marumo Gallants were relegated that season, and Mvelase moved on to TS Galaxy. Here, he joined several other players in their late 30s, himself turning 35 at the end of the season. Nonetheless, Mvelase was a team regular and felt that his performances disproved ageism within soccer.
