= Ahmed Atef =

Ahmed Atef may refer to:

- Ahmed Atef (footballer, born 1998), Egyptian footballer
- Ahmed Atef (footballer, born 2002), Egyptian footballer
