= Yannick Bangala =

Congolese footballer

Yannick Bangala Litombo
Personal information
- Full name: Yannick Bangala Litombo
- Date of birth: 12 April 1994 (age 32)
- Place of birth: Kinshasa, Zaire
- Height: 1.88 m (6 ft 2 in)
- Position: Defender

Team information
- Current team: AS Vita Club
- Number: 4

Senior career*
Years	Team	Apps	(Gls)
2011–2013	FC Les Stars		
2013–2018	Motema Pembe		
2021–2023	Young Africans	6	(0)
2023–2025	Azam FC		
2025–	AS Vita Club	6	(0)

International career^{‡}
2013	DR Congo U20	1	(0)
2013–	DR Congo	22	(0)
- * Club domestic league appearances and goals as of 22:02, 8 January 2015 (UTC) ‡ National team caps and goals as of 20:27, 01 July 2018 (UTC)

Yannick Bangala Litombo (born 12 April 1994) is a Congolese professional footballer who plays as a defender for Illicocqsh Ligue 1 club AS Vita Club and the DR Congo national team.
