= Mahmoud Rizk =

Egyptian footballer (born 1993)

Personal information
- Full name: Mahmoud Ahmed Mahmoud Rizk
- Date of birth: 1 November 1993 (age 33)
- Place of birth: Egypt
- Position: Centre-back

Team information
- Current team: Future
- Number: 4

Youth career
- Al Ahly

Senior career*
Years	Team	Apps	(Gls)
–2015	El Mansoura		
2015–2016	Al Ahly	0	(0)
2015–2016	→ El Entag El Harby (loan)	11	(1)
2016–2018	El Entag El Harby	17	(1)
2018–2022	Al Ittihad	4	(0)
2023–	Future	0	(0)
- * Club domestic league appearances and goals as of 18:55, 8 November 2018 (UTC)

Mahmoud Rizk (Arabic: محمود رزق; born 1 November 1993) is an Egyptian professional footballer who plays as a centre-back for Egyptian Premier League side Future.

Rizk moved from El Mansoura to Al Ahly in 2015 with a 5-year contract, but he was loaned to El Entag El Harby for one year, during his first season with El Entag El Harby, he got an Anterior cruciate ligament injury; however the club signed him on a permanent deal from Al Ahly at the end of the season. In 2017, he renewed his contract with El Entag El Harby for 2 years. Despite renewing his contract, he was released by the club at the end of the 2017–18 Egyptian Premier League season, and he later joined Al Ittihad on a free transfer.
