= Faridi Mussa =

Tanzanian footballer (born 1996)

Personal information
- Full name: Faridi Malik Mussa Shaha
- Date of birth: 21 June 1996 (age 30)
- Place of birth: Morogoro, Tanzania
- Height: 1.61 m (5 ft 3 in)
- Position: Winger

Team information
- Current team: Young Africans
- Number: 17

Youth career
- Azam

Senior career*
Years	Team	Apps	(Gls)
2013–2016	Azam		
2016–2020	Tenerife B	80	(7)
2020–	Young Africans	0	(0)

International career^{‡}
2013–	Tanzania	37	(1)
- * Club domestic league appearances and goals as of 8 March 2020 ‡ National team caps and goals as of 23:15, 10 September 2022 (UTC)

Faridi Malik Mussa Shaha (born 21 June 1996) is a Tanzanian professional footballer who plays as a left winger for Tanzanian Premier League club Young Africans.

== Club career ==
Born in Morogoro, Mussa started his career with Azam FC in 2013. In April 2016, he went on a trial at CD Tenerife, and after impressing in friendly matches, he signed a two-year deal in May and was assigned to the reserves in Tercera División.

Mussa made his debut abroad on 14 January 2017, starting and scoring his team's second in a 2–2 away draw against CF Unión Viera. On 30 April, he scored a brace in a 5–1 win at UD Lanzarote.

On 12 August 2020, Mussa returned to his home country after signing for Young Africans.

== International career ==
Mussa made his debut for the Tanzania national football team on 19 November 2013, coming on as a substitute in a 0–0 friendly draw against Zimbabwe.
