= Ranga Chivaviro =

South African soccer player

Personal information
- Full name: Ranga Piniel Chivaviro
- Date of birth: 21 November 1992 (age 33)
- Place of birth: Limpopo, South Africa
- Height: 1.80 m (5 ft 11 in)
- Position: Forward

Team information
- Current team: Al-Fahaheel

Senior career*
Years	Team	Apps	(Gls)
2013–2016	Witbank Spurs	32	(6)
2016	Cape Town All Stars	10	(3)
2016–2018	Ubuntu Cape Town	50	(16)
2018–2020	Baroka	24	(2)
2019	→ TS Sporting (loan)	6	(1)
2021	Trepça '89	5	(0)
2021–2022	Venda FA	10	(2)
2022–2023	Marumo Gallants	30	(17)
2023–2025	Kaizer Chiefs	45	(9)
2025–2026	Al-Adalah	28	(13)
2026–	Al-Fahaheel	0	(0)
- * Club domestic league appearances and goals as of 04 March 2026

Ranga Chivaviro (born 21 November 1992) is a South African soccer player who plays for Al-Fahaheel, as a forward. He was born in Limpopo, to a South African mother and a Zimbabwean father.

== Club career ==
Chivaviro played for Witbank Spurs, Cape Town All Stars and Ubuntu Cape Town, before signing for South African Premier Division side Baroka in the summer of 2018. After spending part of the 2019–20 season on loan at TS Sporting, he was released by Baroka at the end of the season.

In March 2021, Chivaviro signed for Kosovar side KF Trepça '89. He left the club at the end of the season. In September 2021, he returned to South Africa and signed with Venda FA. He left the club in June 2022.

In August 2022, Chivaviro joined Marumo Gallants and was part of the Gallants side that progressed to the 2022–23 CAF Confederation Cup semi-finals.

In the first leg of their quarter-final, Gallants drew 1–1 against Pyramids in Cairo. Chivaviro gave Gallants a 1–0 lead early in the second half, but Pyramids drew level with a stoppage time penalty. In the return leg in South Africa, Gallants won 1–0 to secure their semi-final place.

Gallants took on 2021–22 Tanzanian Premier League champions Young Africans in the two legged semi-finals. In the first leg in Tanzania on May 10, Young Africans took a 2–0 first leg lead with two goals in the second half.

Ahead of the return leg, Chivaviro and Young Africans' Fiston Kalala Mayele are currently the 2022–23 CAF Confederation Cup's joint top goalscorers, with five goals each.

On 30 June 2023, it was announced that Chivaviro had signed for Kaizer Chiefs.

On 19 September 2025, Chivaviro joined Saudi First Division League side Al-Adalah.

== Personal life ==
Born in South Africa, Chivaviro is of Zimbabwean descent through his father.
