= Allan Kateregga =

Ugandan footballer (born 1994)

Personal information
- Date of birth: 3 June 1994 (age 32)
- Place of birth: Mulago, Uganda
- Height: 1.75 m (5 ft 9 in)
- Position: Attacking midfielder

Team information
- Current team: Police FC

Senior career*
Years	Team	Apps	(Gls)
2012–2013	Victoria University		
2013–2014	Tusker		
2014–2015	BUL		
2015–2017	Leopards		
2017–2018	KCCA FC		
2018–2019	Cape Town City	11	(1)
2019	→ Maritzburg United (loan)	8	(2)
2019–2021	Erbil SC		
2021–2023	Saint-Éloi Lupopo		
2024–	Police FC		

International career
2017–2019	Uganda	8	(0)
- * Club domestic league appearances and goals as of 3 July 2019

Allan Kateregga (born 3 June 1994) is a Ugandan professional footballer who plays as an attacking midfielder for Rwandan club Police FC. Besides playing for the Uganda national team and several clubs in Uganda, he has also played in Kenya, South Africa, and Iraq.

== Career ==
In July 2019, upon his return from loan at Maritzburg United, Kateregga agreed the termination of his contract with Cape Town City.

Kateregga played for Saint-Éloi Lupopo in the Democratic Republic of Congo before his contract expired in 2023 and he joined Rwanda's top tier club Police FC where he won the Rwandan Super Cup title alongside two fellow Ugandans, Ashraf Mandela and Eric Ssenjobe, after defeating APR FC in a penalty shootout.

== Career statistics ==
Appearances and goals by national team and year
National team	Year	Apps	Goals
Uganda	2017	3	0
Uganda	2018	3	0
Uganda	2019	2	0
Total		8	0
