= Bernard Morrison =

Ghanaian professional footballer (born 1999)

Personal information
- Date of birth: 20 May 1993 (age 33)
- Place of birth: Mankessim, Ghana
- Height: 1.78 m (5 ft 10 in)
- Position: Forward

Team information
- Current team: FAR Rabat
- Number: 5

Senior career*
Years	Team	Apps	(Gls)
2011–2013	Heart of Lions		
2013–2015	Ashanti Gold		
2015–2016	AS Vita		
2016–2018	Orlando Pirates	18	(2)
2018–2019	Motema Pembe		
2020	Young Africans		
2020–2022	Simba		
2022–2023	Young Africans		
2023–	AS FAR	7	(0)

International career^{‡}
2015	Ghana	2	(0)
- * Club domestic league appearances and goals as of 1 August 2020 ‡ National team caps and goals as of 1 August 2020

Bernard Morrison (born 20 May 1993) is a Ghanaian professional footballer who plays as a forward for AS FAR in Botola Pro. He has played in the national leagues of Ghana, Democratic Republic of Congo, South Africa, Tanzania and Morocco.

== Club career ==
Morrison was signed by South African club Orlando Pirates in mid-2016.

In January 2020, Morrison joined Young Africans S.C. in Tanzania.

Morrison signed for Simba SC in August 2020. Young Africans, rivals of Simba SC, appealed to the Tanzania Football Federation (TFF), alleging that Morrison had signed a two-year contract renewal. The TFF found that Morrison was a free agent and he went on to play for Simba. In November 2021, the Court of Arbitration for Sport dismissed the Young Africans appeal.

In July 2022, Morrison rejoined Young Africans.

Morrison signed for AS FAR in September 2023. In November, having played seven times in the league for AS FAR, Morrison injured his anterior cruciate ligament, ruling him out for the rest of the season.

== Career statistics ==
As of 12 February 2020

Appearances and goals by club, season and competition
Club	Season	League			Cup		League Cup		Other		Total	
Club	Season	Division	Apps	Goals	Apps	Goals	Apps	Goals	Apps	Goals	Apps	Goals
Orlando Pirates	2016–17	Premier Soccer League	7	0	2	0	1	0	0	0	10	0
Orlando Pirates	2017–18	Premier Soccer League	11	2	0	0	0	0	0	0	11	2
