= Kangnivi Ama Tchoutchoui =

Togolese footballer

Personal information
- Date of birth: 28 May 1994 (age 32)
- Place of birth: Lomé, Togo
- Height: 1.83 m (6 ft 0 in)
- Position: Centre-back

Team information
- Current team: FC Nouadhibou

Senior career*
Years	Team	Apps	(Gls)
2018–2020	Gbohloesu		
2020–	FC Nouadhibou		

International career^{‡}
2019–	Togo	7	(0)
- * Club domestic league appearances and goals as of 22:37, 1 September 2021 (UTC) ‡ National team caps and goals as of 22:37, 1 September 2021 (UTC)

Kangnivi Ama Tchoutchoui (born 28 May 1994) is a Togolese footballer who plays as a centre-back for FC Nouadhibou and the Togo national team.

== Club career ==
Tchoutchoui began his senior career with the Togolese side Gbohloesu, before transferring to Mauritania with FC Nouadhibou on 1 December 2020.

== International career ==
Tchoutchoui made his debut with the Togo national team in a 2–0 2020 African Nations Championship qualification loss to Nigeria on 19 October 2019.
