= Djuma Shabani =

Congolese footballer

Personal information
- Date of birth: 16 March 1993 (age 33)
- Place of birth: Kindu, Zaire
- Height: 1.74 m (5 ft 9 in)
- Position: Right-back

Team information
- Current team: AS Vita Club

Senior career*
Years	Team	Apps	(Gls)
20??–2015	Bel'Or		
2015–2017	FC Renaissance		
2017– 2021	Vita Club		
2021–2023	Young Africans		
2024–2025	Namungo F.C.		
2025–	AS Vita Club		

International career^{‡}
2018–	DR Congo	1	(0)
- * Club domestic league appearances and goals ‡ National team caps and goals as of 13:41, 9 June 2019 (UTC)

Djuma Shabani (born 16 March 1993) is a Congolese professional footballer who plays as a right-back for Tanzanian Premier League club Namungo S.C. and the DR Congo national team.

== Club career ==
Shabani was born in 1993 in Kindu, and played football for the Kinshasa-based club Bel'Or before joining FC Renaissance. In July 2015, he was one of five Renaissance players banned for two years by the Congolese Federation for abusing match officials. Three months later, the five were among the beneficiaries of a general amnesty for those sanctioned under its jurisdiction for non-financial offences. He captained the team in 2016–17 and was described as the "kingpin of the defence", but left at the end of that season for Vita Club. He helped his new club win the 2017–18 Linafoot title as well as reach the 2018 CAF Confederation Cup Final, in which they lost 4–3 on aggregate to Raja Casablanca.

== International career ==
Shabani was called into the DR Congo senior squad for the first time in May 2018, as a late replacement for a friendly against Nigeria, but did not take the field. He made his senior international debut in March 2019, as a second-half substitute as DR Congo held on to the one-goal lead that confirmed their qualification for that year's Africa Cup of Nations. Shabani was named in the provisional 26-man squad for the competition.
