= Kennedy Musonda =

Zambian professional footballer (born 1994)

Personal information
- Date of birth: 22 December 1994 (age 31)
- Height: 1.76 m (5 ft 9 in)
- Position: Striker

Team information
- Current team: Hapoel Nof HaGalil
- Number: 19

Senior career*
Years	Team	Apps	(Gls)
2015–2016	Lusaka Dynamos		(6)
2016	Nakambala Leopards		(1)
2017	Zanaco	9+	(4)
2018	Kabwe Youth Soccer Academy		
2019	Green Eagles		(8)
2020–2023	Power Dynamos		(19)
2023–2025	Young Africans	46	(10)
2025–2026	Hapoel Ramat Gan	18	(4)
2026–	Hapoel Nof HaGalil	14	(2)

International career^{‡}
2019–	Zambia	17	(4)
- * Club domestic league appearances and goals as of 24 June 2026 ‡ National team caps and goals as of 8 September 2025

Kennedy Musonda (born 22 December 1994) is a Zambian professional footballer who plays as a striker for Liga Leumit club Hapoel Nof HaGalil and the Zambia national team.

== International career ==
On 10 December 2025, Musonda was called up to the Zambia squad for the 2025 Africa Cup of Nations.

== International statistics ==
As of match played 8 September 2025

Appearances and goals by national team and year
National team	Year	Apps	Goals
Zambia	2019	1	0
Zambia	2020	0	0
Zambia	2021	0	0
Zambia	2022	0	0
Zambia	2023	1	0
Zambia	2024	13	4
Zambia	2025	2	0
Total		17	4

Scores and results list Zambia's goal tally first, score column indicates score after each Musonda goal.

List of international goals scored by Kennedy Musonda
No.	Date	Venue	Opponent	Score	Result	Competition	Ref.
1	10 September 2024	Levy Mwanawasa Stadium, Ndola, Zambia	Sierra Leone	1–0	3–2	2025 Africa Cup of Nations qualification	
2	15 October 2024	Ahmadou Ahidjo Stadium, Yaoundé, Cameroon	Chad	1–0	1–0	2025 Africa Cup of Nations qualification	
3	15 November 2024	Levy Mwanawasa Stadium, Ndola, Zambia	Ivory Coast	1–0	1–0	2025 Africa Cup of Nations qualification	
4	19 November 2024	Samuel Kanyon Doe Sports Complex, Paynesville, Liberia	Sierra Leone	2–0	2–0	2025 Africa Cup of Nations qualification	
