= 2024–25 NC Magra season =

NC Magra
2024–25 season
- President: Azzedine Bennacer
- Head coach: Lyamine Bougherara (until 27 December 2024); Fouad Bouali (from 12 January 2025) (until 20 March 2025); Abdelaziz Abbès (from 23 March 2025)
- Stadium: Boucheligue Brothers Stadium
- Ligue 1: 15th (relegated)
- Algerian Cup: Round of 32
- Top goalscorer: League: Adil Djabout (6 goals); All: Adil Djabout (6 goals)
Home colours	Away colours	Third colours

The 2024–25 season, is NC Magra's 6th season and the club's 6th consecutive season in the top flight of Algerian football. In addition to the domestic league, NC Magra are participating in the Algerian Cup. On June 27, 2024, The federal office approved the calendar for the 2024–25 Ligue 1 season with the aim of ending on May 31, 2025. The first round is scheduled for September 14, this delay is motivated both by an extended end of the 2023–24 season but also by the holding of early presidential elections which will take place on September 7, 2024. However, the Ligue de Football Professionnel decided to postpone the start of the Ligue 1 by a week, on September 21.

On August 14, 2024, Azzedine Bennacer was re-elected as president of NC Magra for a new term. In a statement to the media, Bennacer once again called for the arrival of a national company, like other professional clubs, to take over the destiny of SSPA NC Magra. Bennacer added "We have been informed that the club is going to be bought by the Groupe Cosider. We are still waiting for the arrival of the company in question. I can assure that within forty-eight hours the transfer of ownership will be completed. We are up to date with our balance sheets and accounting." Regarding the stadium works and the disputes at the CRL level, the president expects help from local authorities.

== Squad list ==
Players and squad numbers last updated on 5 February 2025.
Note: Flags indicate national team as has been defined under FIFA eligibility rules. Players may hold more than one non-FIFA nationality.

No.	Nat.	Name	Position	Date of birth (age)	Signed from
Goalkeepers
1	(Algeria)	Mohamed Tayeb Cherif	GK	12 July 1999 (aged 25)	(Algeria) Youth system
16	(Algeria)	Imad Benchlef	GK	12 October 1993 (aged 30)	(Algeria) ES Sétif
Defenders
3	(Algeria)	Moncef Merouani	LB	19 October 2000 (aged 23)	(Algeria) JS Saoura
4	(Algeria)	Chemseddine Lakehal	CB	29 February 2000 (aged 24)	(Algeria) WA Tlemcen
5	(Algeria)	M'Hamed Merouani	CB	29 March 1997 (aged 27)	Unattached
17	(Algeria)	Aymen Attou	RB	8 October 1997 (aged 26)	(Algeria) USM Khenchela
18	(Algeria)	Ibrahim Bekakchi	CB	10 January 1992 (aged 32)	(Algeria) US Souf
20	(Algeria)	Zakaria Zaitri	RB	18 July 1997 (aged 27)	Unattached
24	(Algeria)	Abdelhak Belkacemi	LB	27 July 1992 (aged 32)	(Algeria) US Biskra
25	(Algeria)	Khaled Bouhakak	CB	18 September 1993 (aged 30)	(Algeria) JS Kabylie
Midfielders
6	(Algeria)	Zakarya Kemoukh	DM	6 March 1992 (aged 32)	(Algeria) CS Constantine
8	(Algeria)	Khathir Baaziz	DM	17 January 1995 (aged 29)	(Algeria) JS Saoura
14	(Algeria)	Foued Hadded	DM	1 November 1990 (aged 33)	(Algeria) USM Khenchela
15	(Mali)	Salam Jiddou	AM	1 February 2000 (aged 24)	(France) ES Sétif
23	(Algeria)	Faik Amrane	AM	26 November 1997 (aged 26)	(Algeria) JS Kabylie
27	(Algeria)	Abdeldjalil Ould Ammar	CM	12 October 2003 (aged 20)	(Algeria) JS Saoura
28	(Algeria)	Mostafa Berkane	AM	21 October 2002 (aged 21)	(Algeria) USM Alger
Forwards
7	(Algeria)	Akram Demane	LW	1 January 1990 (aged 34)	(Algeria) ES Mostaganem
9	(Algeria)	Moundhir Bouzekri	LW	16 December 2001 (aged 22)	(Algeria) MC Alger
10	(Algeria)	Adil Djabout	ST	31 December 1992 (aged 31)	(Saudi Arabia) Al-Entesar Club
11	(Algeria)	Hamza Demane	ST	23 February 1989 (aged 35)	(Algeria) CS Constantine
19	(Algeria)	Ishak Harrari	LW	9 June 1998 (aged 26)	(Algeria) CS Constantine
21	(Mauritania)	Yassin Cheikh El Welly	RW	10 October 1998 (aged 25)	(Algeria) US Monastir
22	(Algeria)	Amine Benmessabih	RW	2 January 1996 (aged 28)	(Algeria) CS Constantine
26	(Algeria)	Abdesslem Bouchouareb	LW	10 December 1997 (aged 26)	(Algeria) ES Sétif

== Transfers ==
=== In ===
==== Summer ====
Date	Pos	Player	Moving from	Fee	Source
9 August 2024	AM	(Algeria) Adil Djabout	(Saudi Arabia) Al-Entesar Club	Free transfer	
12 August 2024	FW	(Algeria) Louey Berrahal	CS Constantine U21	Free transfer	
13 August 2024	LW	(Algeria) Akram Demane	ES Mostaganem	Free transfer	
13 August 2024	AM	(Algeria) Faik Amrane	JS Kabylie	Free transfer	
19 August 2024	CB	(Algeria) Abdeldjalil Mancer	(Qatar) Al Bidda SC	Free transfer	
19 August 2024	MF	(Algeria) Adem Aichouche	ES Sétif U21	Free transfer	
20 August 2024	GK	(Algeria) Imad Benchlef	ES Sétif	Free transfer	
20 August 2024	RB	(Algeria) Zakaria Zaitri	Unattached	Free transfer	
20 August 2024	DM	(Algeria) Khathir Baaziz	JS Saoura	Free transfer	
20 August 2024	RW	(Algeria) Mohamed Amine Semahi	USM Khenchela	Free transfer	
25 August 2024	LW	(Algeria) Ishak Salaheddine Harrari	CS Constantine	Free transfer	
27 August 2024	LW	(Algeria) Massinissa Ould Taleb	JS Kabylie U21	Free transfer	
27 August 2024	FW	(Algeria) Badis Khadiche	JSM Skikda	Free transfer	

==== Winter ====
Date	Pos	Player	Moving from	Fee	Source
9 January 2025	AM	(Algeria) Khalid Dahamni	Olympique Akbou	Free transfer	
29 January 2025	RW	(Mauritania) Yassin Cheikh El Welly	(Tunisia) US Monastir	Free transfer	
2 February 2025	RW	(Algeria) Amine Benmessabih	CS Constantine	Free transfer	
5 February 2025	CM	(Algeria) Abdeldjalil Ould Ammar	JS Saoura	Free transfer	
5 February 2025	AM	(Mali) Salam Jiddou	ES Sétif	Free transfer	
11 January 2025	LB	(Algeria) Moncef Merouani	JS Saoura	Free transfer	

=== Out ===
==== Summer ====
Date	Pos	Player	Moving to	Fee	Source
17 July 2024	FW	(Algeria) Mohamed Kosaï Djeïdjaâ	Paradou AC	Free transfer	
8 August 2024	FW	(Algeria) Laid Saidi	US Biskra	Free transfer	
9 September 2024	ST	(Algeria) Bouzid Dadache	US Biskra	Free transfer	

== Competitions ==
=== Overview ===
Competition	Record								Started round	Final position / round	First match	Last match
Competition	G	W	D	L	GF	GA	GD	Win %	Started round	Final position / round	First match	Last match
Ligue 1	30	7	10	13	23	35	−12	23.33	—N/a	15th	20 September 2024	21 June 2025
Algerian Cup	2	1	0	1	1	1	+0	50.00	Round of 64	Round of 32	4 January 2025	10 February 2025
Total	32	8	10	14	24	36	−12	25.00				

Updated to match played 21 June 2025
Source: Competitions

=== Ligue 1 ===
==== League table ====
Pos	Team	Pld	W	D	L	GF	GA	GD	Pts	Qualification or relegation
12	MC El Bayadh	30	9	9	12	23	26	−3	36	
13	ASO Chlef	30	7	13	10	24	27	−3	34	
14	ES Mostaganem	30	8	10	12	23	31	−8	34	
15	NC Magra (R)	30	7	10	13	23	35	−12	31	Relegation to Algerian Ligue 2
16	US Biskra (R)	30	3	11	16	12	31	−19	20	Relegation to Algerian Ligue 2

Source: the-sports.org
Rules for classification: 1) points; 2) head-to-head points; 3) head-to-head goal difference; 4) goal difference; 5) total goals; 6) fairplay ranking; 7) playoff.
(R) Relegated

==== Results summary ====
Overall								Home						Away					
Pld	W	D	L	GF	GA	GD	Pts	W	D	L	GF	GA	GD	W	D	L	GF	GA	GD
30	7	10	13	23	35	−12	31	7	6	2	18	11	+7	0	4	11	5	24	−19

Last updated: 21 June 2025.
Source: Competitive matches

==== Results by round ====
Round	1	2	3	4	5	6	7	8	9	10	11	12	13	14	15	16	17	18	19	20	21	22	23	24	25	26	27	28	29	30
Ground	A	H	A	H	A	H	A	A	H	A	H	A	H	A	H	H	A	H	A	H	A	H	H	A	H	A	H	A	H	A
Result	L	D	D	D	L	W	L	L	W	D	W	L	D	D	L	D	L	D	L	D	L	W	W	L	W	L	L	L	W	D
Position	13	13	13	13	16	13	15	16	15	14	11	12	13	13	14	14	14	14	15	15	16	15	14	15	13	15	15	15	15	15

Updated to match(es) played on 21 June 2025. Source: Competitive matches
A = Away; H = Home; W = Win; D = Draw; L = Loss

==== Matches ====
The league fixtures were announced on 11 July 2024.

All times are local, WAT (UTC+1).

Win Draw Loss Postponed

20 September 2024 Round 1	Olympique Akbou	1–0	NC Magra	Béjaïa
18:00	Askar 7'	Report		Stadium: Maghrebi Unity Stadium; Referee: Lotfi Bekouassa; VAR: Fateh Harkat

28 September 2024 Round 2	NC Magra	0–0	USM Alger	Magra
16:00		Report		Stadium: Boucheligue Brothers Stadium; Attendance: 0 (close doors); Referee: Alaa Bouab

4 October 2024 Round 3	ES Sétif	0–0	NC Magra	Sétif
18:00		Report		Stadium: 8 May 1945 Stadium; Referee: Youcef Gamouh; VAR: Lotfi Bekouassa

12 October 2024 Round 4	NC Magra	2–2	US Biskra	Magra
16:00	Kemoukh 4'; Bouchouareb 7'	Report	Saâd 39'; Nzaou 89'	Stadium: Boucheligue Brothers Stadium; Referee: Anes Azrine

19 October 2024 Round 5	MC El Bayadh	4–0	NC Magra	El Bayadh
16:00	Chahrour 32'; Benchoucha 69' (pen.); Serraoui 83'; Belalem 87'	Report		Stadium: Zakaria Medjdoub Stadium; Referee: Tayeb Benyabka

25 October 2024 Round 6	NC Magra	1–0	CR Belouizdad	Magra
15:00	Djabout 74'	Report		Stadium: Boucheligue Brothers Stadium; Referee: Akram Mechairia

2 November 2024 Round 7	USM Khenchela	1–0	NC Magra	Khenchela
15:00	Boumechra 33'	Report		Stadium: Amar Hamam Stadium; Referee: Nabil Boukhalfa

9 November 2024 Round 8	JS Saoura	1–0	NC Magra	Béchar
16:00	Boutiche 85' (pen.)	Report		Stadium: 20 August 1955 Stadium; Referee: Ayoub Belhachemi

16 November 2024 Round 9	NC Magra	1–0	ES Mostaganem	Magra
15:00	Amrane 16'	Report		Stadium: Boucheligue Brothers Stadium; Referee: Fateh Harkat

23 November 2024 Round 10	ASO Chlef	2–2	NC Magra	Chlef
15:00	Agbagno 16' (pen.), 90+2'	Report	Lakehal 3'; Bouzekri 54'	Stadium: Mohamed Boumezrag Stadium; Referee: Yahia Dehar

30 November 2024 Round 11	NC Magra	2–1	MC Oran	Magra
15:00	Amrane 58', 90+4' (pen.)	Report	Boussalem 45+1'	Stadium: Boucheligue Brothers Stadium; Referee: Redouane Allou

8 December 2024 Round 12	JS Kabylie	2–1	NC Magra	Tizi Ouzou
17:45	Boudebouz 44'; Ouattara 84'	Report	Kemoukh 25'	Stadium: Hocine Aït Ahmed Stadium; Referee: Youcef Taieb Bouderbal; VAR: Abderahmane Sahraoui

13 December 2024 Round 13	NC Magra	1–1	Paradou AC	Magra
15:00	Merouani 26'	Report	Boulbina 85'	Stadium: Boucheligue Brothers Stadium; Attendance: 0 (close doors); Referee: Tayeb Benyabka

21 December 2024 Round 14	CS Constantine	0–0	NC Magra	Constantine
16:30		Report		Stadium: Chahid Hamlaoui Stadium; Referee: Lotfi Bekouassa

26 December 2024 Round 15	NC Magra	1–2	MC Alger	Magra
15:00	Bouzekri 48'	Report	Halaïmia 54', 90+1'	Stadium: Boucheligue Brothers Stadium; Attendance: 0 (close doors); Referee: Houssam Benyahia

14 February 2025 Round 16	NC Magra	1–1	Olympique Akbou	Magra
15:00	Lakehal 22'	Report	Lachahab 90+9'	Stadium: Boucheligue Brothers Stadium; Referee: Abdelali Ibrir

18 February 2025 Round 17	USM Alger	2–0	NC Magra	Baraki
20:00	Likonza 38'; Merghem 59'	Report		Stadium: Nelson Mandela Stadium; Referee: Fateh Harkat

26 February 2025 Round 18	NC Magra	0–0	ES Sétif	Magra
15:30		Report		Stadium: Boucheligue Brothers Stadium; Referee: Alaa Bouab

7 March 2025 Round 19	US Biskra	1–0	NC Magra	Biskra
22:00	Adaika 8'	Report		Stadium: 18 February Stadium; Attendance: 0 (close doors); Referee: Youcef Gamouh; VAR: Redouane Allou

16 March 2025 Round 20	NC Magra	0–0	MC El Bayadh	Magra
15:00		Report		Stadium: Boucheligue Brothers Stadium; Referee: Hamza Bouslimani

5 April 2025 Round 21	CR Belouizdad	4–0	NC Magra	Baraki
17:00	Mahious 9'; Belkhir 57'; Meziane 75'; Hamroune 88'	Report		Stadium: Nelson Mandela Stadium; Attendance: 0 (close doors); Referee: Yahia Dehar; VAR: Nabil Boukhalfa

12 April 2025 Round 22	NC Magra	2–0	USM Khenchela	Magra
16:00	Djabout 40', 53'	Report		Stadium: Boucheligue Brothers Stadium; Referee: Houssam Benyahia

18 April 2025 Round 23	NC Magra	2–0	JS Saoura	Magra
15:30	Djabout 69' (pen.); Harrari 90+4'	Report		Stadium: Boucheligue Brothers Stadium; Referee: Anes Azrine

26 April 2025 Round 24	ES Mostaganem	2–1	NC Magra	Mostaganem
16:00	Benlamri 24'; Bouguettaya 86'	Report	H.Demane 90+5'	Stadium: Mohamed Bensaïd Stadium; Referee: Haitham Ghouti

10 May 2025 Round 25	NC Magra	2–0	ASO Chlef	Magra
16:00	Djabout 41'; Bouzekri 59'	Report		Stadium: Boucheligue Brothers Stadium; Referee: Youcef Gamouh

16 May 2025 Round 26	MC Oran	2–1	NC Magra	Oran
16:30	Jobe 8', 45+3'	Report	Amrane 15'	Stadium: Ahmed Zabana Stadium; Referee: Mehdi Oukil; VAR: Lahlou Benbraham

25 May 2025 Round 27	NC Magra	1–3	JS Kabylie	Magra
17:00	Djabout 23'	Report	Ignatyev 39'; Berkane 65'; Boualia 79'	Stadium: Boucheligue Brothers Stadium; Referee: Houssam Benyahia

12 June 2025 Round 28	Paradou AC	2–0	NC Magra	Baraki
21:00	Boulbina 84', 89'	Report		Stadium: Nelson Mandela Stadium; Referee: Yahia Dehar; VAR: Alaa Bouab

17 June 2025 Round 29	NC Magra	2–1	CS Constantine	Magra
17:30	Amrane 7', 17'	Report	Nkembe 65'	Stadium: Boucheligue Brothers Stadium; Referee: Lahlou Benbraham

21 June 2025 Round 30	MC Alger	0–0	NC Magra	Algiers
17:45		Report		Stadium: Stade du 5 Juillet; Referee: Youcef Taieb Bouderbal; VAR: Fateh Harkat

=== Algerian Cup ===
4 January 2025 Round of 64	NC Magra	1–0 (a.e.t.)	MB Rouissat	Magra
14:00	Bouzekri 100'	Report		Stadium: Boucheligue Brothers Stadium; Referee: Djamel Eddine Zenati

10 February 2025 Round of 32	USM Alger	1–0	NC Magra	Algiers
19:00	Belkacemi 47'	Report		Stadium: Stade du 5 Juillet; Referee: Ayoub Belhachemi

== Squad information ==
=== Appearances and goals ===
As of 21 June 2025

No.	Pos	Player	Nat	Ligue 1			Algerian Cup			Total		
No.	Pos	Player	Nat	App	St	G	App	St	G	App	St	G
Goalkeepers
1	GK	Mohamed Tayeb Cherif	(Algeria)	12	12	0	1	1	0	13	13	0
16	GK	Imad Benchlef	(Algeria)	18	18	0	1	1	0	19	19	0
Defenders
3	LB	Moncef Merouani	(Algeria)	10	8	0	0	0	0	10	8	0
4	CB	Chemseddine Lakehal	(Algeria)	25	24	2	2	2	0	27	26	2
5	CB	M'Hamed Merouani	(Algeria)	23	21	2	2	1	0	25	22	2
17	RB	Aymen Attou	(Algeria)	7	5	0	0	0	0	7	5	0
18	CB	Ibrahim Bekakchi	(Algeria)	27	26	0	0	0	0	27	26	0
20	RB	Zakaria Zaitri	(Algeria)	16	14	0	2	2	0	18	16	0
24	LB	Abdelhak Belkacemi	(Algeria)	10	8	0	1	1	0	11	9	0
25	CB	Khaled Bouhakak	(Algeria)	13	12	0	2	2	0	15	14	0
Midfielders
6	DM	Zakarya Kemoukh	(Algeria)	23	22	2	2	2	0	25	24	2
8	DM	Khathir Baaziz	(Algeria)	17	10	0	1	1	0	18	11	0
14	DM	Foued Hadded	(Algeria)	23	22	0	2	1	0	25	23	0
15	AM	Salam Jiddou	(Mali)	5	3	0	1	0	0	6	3	0
23	AM	Faik Amrane	(Algeria)	23	19	5	0	0	0	23	19	5
27	CM	Abdeldjalil Ouldammar	(Algeria)	1	0	0	0	0	0	1	0	0
28	AM	Mostafa Berkane	(Algeria)	28	24	0	2	2	0	30	26	0
44	DM	Agour Ait Hamadouche	(Algeria)	1	0	0	1	0	0	2	0	0
Forwards
7	LW	Akram Demane	(Algeria)	12	2	0	1	0	0	13	2	0
9	LW	Moundhir Bouzekri	(Algeria)	27	21	3	2	2	1	29	23	4
10	ST	Adil Djabout	(Algeria)	21	16	6	0	0	0	21	16	6
11	ST	Hamza Demane	(Algeria)	17	12	1	1	1	0	18	13	1
19	LW	Ishak Salaheddine Harrari	(Algeria)	23	3	1	2	2	0	25	5	1
21	RW	Yassin Cheikh El Welly	(Mauritania)	15	15	0	1	0	0	16	15	0
22	RW	Mohamed Amine Benmessabih	(Algeria)	5	0	0	0	0	0	5	0	0
26	LW	Abdesslem Bouchouareb	(Algeria)	13	12	1	1	0	0	14	12	1
47	ST	Adem Aichouche	(Algeria)	1	0	0	0	0	0	1	0	0
Players transferred out during the season
~~21~~	CB	Abdeldjalil Mancer	(Algeria)	3	0	0	0	0	0	3	0	0
~~15~~	DM	Zakaria Messibah	(Algeria)	2	1	0	0	0	0	2	1	0
~~29~~	RW	Mohamed Amine Semahi	(Algeria)	2	0	0	1	1	0	3	1	0
~~22~~	ST	Badis Khadiche	(Algeria)	2	0	0	1	0	0	3	0	0
Total				30		23	2		1	32		24

Last updated: 21 June 2025
Source: mondefootball.fr

=== Goalscorers ===
As of 21 June 2025

Includes all competitive matches.

No.	Nat.	Player	Pos.	L1	AC	TOTAL
10	(Algeria)	Adil Djabout	ST	6	0	6
23	(Algeria)	Faik Amrane	AM	5	0	5
9	(Algeria)	Moundhir Bouzekri	LW	3	1	4
4	(Algeria)	Chemseddine Lakehal	CB	2	0	2
5	(Algeria)	M'Hamed Merouani	CB	2	0	2
6	(Algeria)	Zakarya Kemoukh	DM	2	0	2
19	(Algeria)	Ishak Harrari	LW	1	0	1
26	(Algeria)	Abdesslem Bouchouareb	LW	1	0	1
11	(Algeria)	Hamza Demane	ST	1	0	1
Own Goals				0	0	0
Totals				23	1	24

=== Clean sheets ===
As of 21 June 2025

					Clean sheets		
No.	Nat	Name	GP	GA	L 1	AC	Total
1	(Algeria)	Mohamed Tayeb Cherif	13	16	5	1	6
16	(Algeria)	Imad Benchlef	19	20	6	0	6
		TOTALS		36	11	1	12
