= 2022–23 USM Alger season =

USM Alger
2022–23 season
- Owner: Groupe SERPORT
- President: Sid Ahmed Arab (from 26 June 2022)
- Head coach: Jamil Benouahi (from 6 July 2022) (until 3 August 2022); Boualem Charef (from 4 August 2022) (until 25 December 2022); Abdelhak Benchikha (from 25 December 2022)
- Stadium: Omar Benrabah Stadium; Stade du 5 Juillet
- Ligue 1: 11th
- Algerian Cup: Round of 64
- Confederation Cup: Winners
- Top goalscorer: League: Aymen Mahious (6 goals); All: Aymen Mahious (11 goals)
- Biggest win: USM Alger 4–1 Al Akhdar
- Biggest defeat: CS Constantine 3–0 USM Alger
Home colours	Away colours

In the 2022–23 season, USM Alger competed in the Ligue 1 for the 45th season. It was their 28th consecutive season in the top flight of Algerian football. In addition to the domestic league, USM Alger participated in the Algerian Cup and the CAF Confederation Cup.

== Review ==
=== Background ===
On 26 June 2022, Sid Ahmed Arab has succeeded Achour Djelloul who has been imprisoned, as the new president of the club. Reda Abdouche has been appointed as the new general director, this was his second time after 2011. On July 6, 2022, Jamil Benouahi extended his contract for another year to remain the head coach for the new season. On July 21, in the first press conference Reda Abdouche spoke about the club's goals and the recruitment file, the first questions were about the departure of some players, Abdouche stated that he did not reach a month in his position. Where stated that during the spare period in the club, some players decided to sign up for other clubs, such as goalkeeper Alexis Guendouz and there are players that the technical staff decided not to enter in their plans, most notably Hamza Koudri who has been in the club for ten years. Abdouche stated that it is an adventure to rely on a player who suffered from an injury in Cruciate ligament that kept him out of the field for a year and at his age especially since he's at the end of his contract. As for contracts, Abdouche stated that they contacted players, including former players in the club, and although they promised to sign, they refused to answer their calls and joined other clubs.

He also said that they will not pay billions to buy player contracts and that this is not the club's policy and the rest of the clubs are free if they want to, Regarding the stadium, Abdouche said that the interests of the municipality APC and the National Authority for Technical Control of Construction CTC said that Omar Hamadi Stadium poses a danger to the supporters and it was decided to close it and they would play either at Salem Mabrouki Stadium or Omar Benrabah Stadium, especially with the closure of Stade du 5 Juillet until January due to CHAN 2022.

=== Pre-season ===
On August 1, 2022, USM Alger delegation expected to move to Antalya, Turkey, to take a 14-day preparatory training for the start of the season. But on the day of travel coach Jamil Benouahi and some players refused to travel because of their financial dues and also because of the absence of Mustapha Bouchina and the coach's assistant on the travel list, immediately after that USM Alger administration decided to dismiss the coach from his position, In a press conference Reda Abdouche said that traveling to Turkey would have been on a private plane directly to Antalya, and that the place for preparation was very good and that the team would have played five friendly matches, and that the issue of the assistant coach first of all, has not passed his contract yet and he cannot get a ticket. Bouchina the reason is that his passport is removed from the Spanish embassy and immediately after his recovery, he will be transferred to Turkey, and that the matter is not in their hands especially since the diplomatic relations between the two countries are bad, As for the players salaries Abdouche said that the money entered the club's account on 28 July, after the director of Groupe SERPORT signed it.

The next day, 14 players, fitness coach Kamel Boudjenane and goalkeeping coach Lounès Gaouaoui signed a document that refused to dismiss Benouahi and demanded the departure of some of those in the administration and the assistant coach Sofiane Benkhelifa who was appointed by the administration, as well as Farid Saffar a person according to the coach and supporters the cause of all the problems and does not have any position in the club. The leaders of USM Alger have put an end to the functions of the technical staff of Benouahi. The coach and his peers, fitness coach Boudjenane and goalkeeper coach Gaouaoui, were dismissed from their posts after a hearing before the disciplinary board.

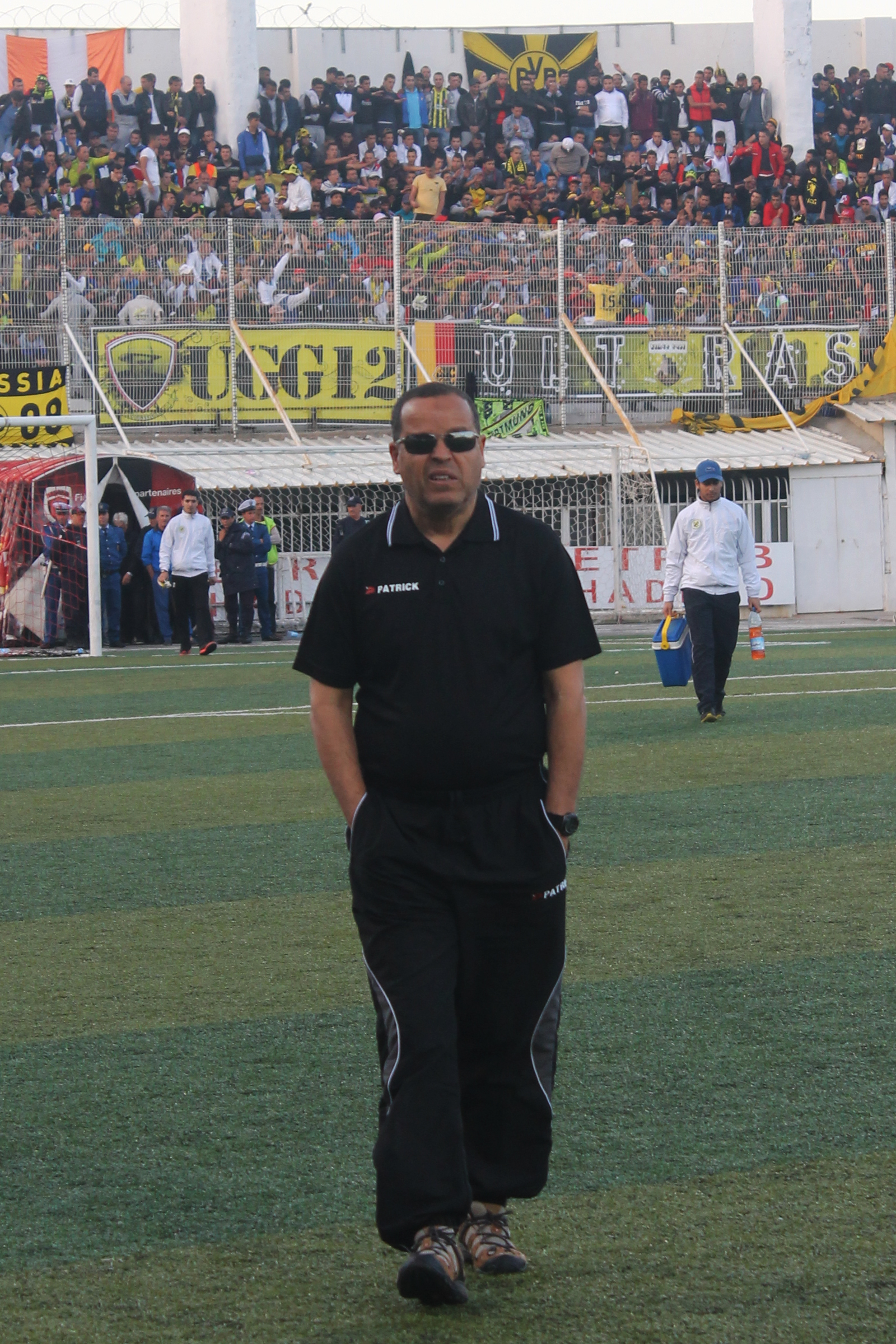
Boualem Charef was contracted to train USM Alger replacing Jamil Benouahi and after four months Charef was dismissed from his position.

On August 4, 2022, USMA contracted with Boualem Charef to be the new coach with his staff, after canceling Turkey's training, it was replaced by another in Tunisia, where the team moved on August 9 with a delegation of 29 players, with the absence of three players, Brahim Benzaza and Samy Bouali for injury and Hamed Belem due to COVID-19. On August 18, the administration of USM Alger agreed with the authorities of Dar El Beïda to receive the current season at Omar Benrabah Stadium in the presence of the supporters and start against MC El Bayadh.

==== First-team transfers (summer transfer window) ====
Last season, number of players were loaned and they are Mehdi Beneddine to French club Châteauroux, Anis Khemaissia to USM Annaba, and goalkeeper Abdelmoumen Sifour to RC Arbaâ. The last two after their return from loan were released. The first signing of the season was striker Abdesslem Bouchouareb from NC Magra for two seasons, three days after which the club contracted with the midfield attacker of JS Bordj Ménaïel Abderrahmane Bacha for two seasons. The third contract was the goalkeeper Imad Benchlef also for two seasons, coming from NA Hussein Dey as a substitute for Alexis Guendouz whose contract expired. On August 22, former ES Sétif captain Akram Djahnit has just signed with USM Alger for the next two seasons as the Latest recruits, Djahnit decided to submitting his case to the National Dispute Resolution Chamber which agreed with him, therefore terminating his contract.

After that the club promoted six players from the reserves they are Abdelkader Belharrane, Mohamed Djenidi, Abdessamed Bounacer, Samy Bouali, Aymen Kennan and Mostafa Berkane. USM Alger then signed strikers Khaled Bousseliou from CR Belouizdad and Khalil Darfalou from ES Sétif, After the Ghanaian Kwame Opoku was loaned to Saudi club Najran SC, the foreign player's card became empty, so the club signed a contract with the Libyan Zakaria Alharaish coming from Sutjeska Nikšić from Montenegro for two seasons. As for Taher Benkhelifa who was dismissed by the coach at the time Benouahi, but with the advent of the new coach Boualem Charef he re-contracted him.

On October 19, 2022, former player Tarek Hadj Adlane returned to the club, where he was appointed to head the recruitment and discovery committee, as well as responsible for the club's media cell. On November 7, USM Alger announced to the public opinion that it had settled the case of coach Denis Lavagne by paying the full financial dues he demanded through "FIFA", USMA considered that the case of Lavane is from the "past", and this file was finally closed after transferring the funds to his account within the legal deadlines set by the "FIFA", and also reassured the supporters that the team will continue to prepare for the upcoming challenges in a normal way including the assignment process. On November 26, 2022, USM Alger announced that its request for domiciliation at Stade du 5 Juillet was rejected by the Office of the Olympic Complex Mohamed Boudiaf and argued its refusal by its desire to keep this enclosure closed until the kick-off of the CHAN 2022.

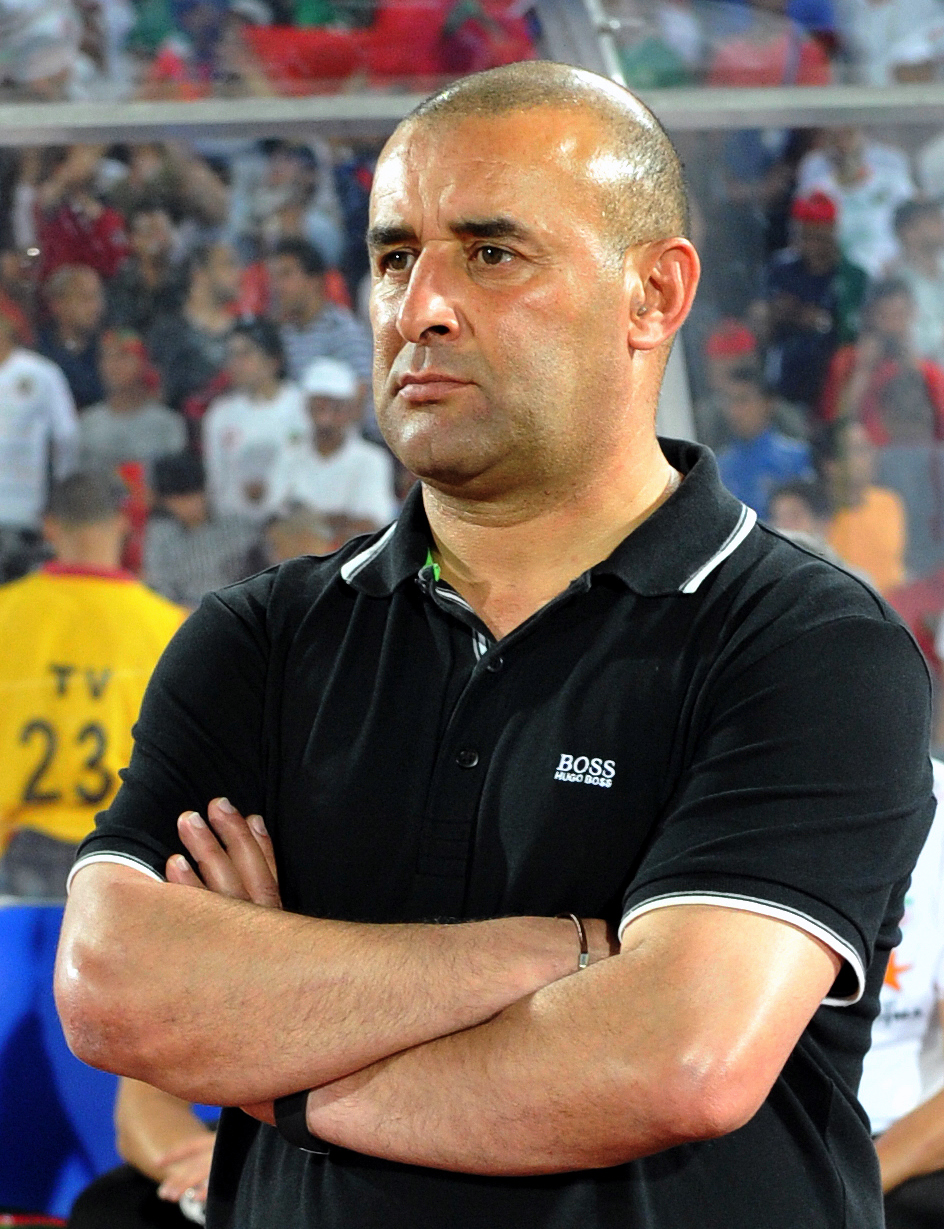
Abdelhak Benchikha became the new coach starting from December 25, for a year and a half.

On December 25, 2022, USM Alger terminated the contract with Boualem Charef, with three months compensation, and contracted with Abdelhak Benchikha as a new coach for a year and a half, with Farid Zamiti, assistant, and Farid Belmellat, coach of the goalkeepers. On January 3, 2023, Madjid Bougherra unveiled the list of 28 players who will represent Algeria at the 2022 African Nations Championship, including nine players from USMA, Belaïd, Loucif, Radouani, Baouche, Chita, Djahnit, Meziane, Mahious and Ait El Hadj, Two-thirds of Algeria's roster is made up of players from CR Belouizdad and USM Alger.

==== First-team transfers (winter transfer window) ====
In the winter transfers the club released four players, namely defender Mehdi Beneddine who was not included in the options of the coach, and Burkinabe Hamed Belem who did not recover all his capabilities after the serious injury he suffered a year ago. and finally the Ghanaian Kwame Opoku who was released for free despite the great financial value that he received. He brought it at a value of 350,000 euros. As for Abderrahmane Bacha was loaned to USM Khenchela for six months, a last minute transfer which materialized during the last hours of the winter transfer window. In terms of recruitment, USM Alger contracted with one player, the Botswana striker Tumisang Orebonye, coming from the Moroccan club OC Khouribga.

On March 13, 2023, in the late match against HB Chelghoum Laïd in the Ligue 1, USM Alger supporters faced problems entering the stadium, accusing the club administration of being the reason. In the 37th minute of the second half the supporters left the stands in protest against them, especially Sid Ahmed Arab and Reda Abdouche. After the end of the match, Abdelhak Benchikha stated that he did not understand the anger of the supporters and that he Satisfied with the performance of his players, especially since in a month they played eight matches. On March 15, USM Alger announced that Abdessamed Bounacer was invited to trials with Paris FC and FC Sochaux-Montbéliard. It was a decision that the supporters did not like, after which Bounacer participated in his first match with the first team in the CAF Confederation Cup, becoming the youngest player to represent USM Alger in Africa at the age of 18. On April 11, the technical staff gave Bounacer the green light to conduct experiments in Europe.

==== CAF Confederation Cup final ====
Groupe UNITED 37 against AS FAR in the quarter-finals of the 2022–23 CAF Confederation Cup.

In the quarter-finals of the Confederation Cup and in the first leg match against AS FAR, USMA achieved victory with two goals scored by defenders Radouani and Belaïd. With the elimination from the Algerian Cup and the big difference with the Ligue 1 leaders, winning the Confederation Cup became the only goal this season, as stated by chairman of the Board of Directors Sid Ahmed Arab. In the return match and after a wonderful reception from the Moroccan team, the beginning of the match was not good as it conceded a goal in the first ten minutes, two minutes after that Radouani equalized the score, in the second half and in the first quarter AS FAR scored the second goal, but substitute Khaled Bousseliou equalized the score in the 78th minute which facilitated USM Alger's mission to qualify for the semi-finals.

In the semi-finals the club moved to Bouaké to play against ASEC Mimosas where the first leg ended in a draw, a week later in the second leg USMA advanced to the final for the first time after winning with two goals. Benchikha said after the match that it is the time to win the CAF Confederation Cup title for the first time in the history of USM Alger, also said "I am very happy with this meeting and the result. I'm also happy with what our audience did in the stands". USM Alger made a big step towards the title by winning 2–1 in Dar es Salaam in the first leg of the Confederation Cup final against Young Africans. It is on a soggy ground that USMA fought a real fight from start to finish, Mahious opened the score in the 32nd minute after a foul from Brahim Benzaza, despite everything Young Africans tied in the 81st minute with a very beautiful goal scored by Mayele.

We preferred the Stade du 5 Juillet because it's our stadium, we know it and it's big. The Baraki stadium poses a problem especially for the supporters who cannot park there, they have to leave their car at the Sablate then take a bus, that's not okay.

— Sid Ahmed Arab a statement about the stadium.

However less than three minutes later they lead an offensive by Orebonye who finds Bousseliou in the area who without panicking will shift Islam Merili who scores the second goal. Sid Ahmed Arab explained that the club rejected the offer to play the second leg of the CAF Confederation Cup at Nelson Mandela Stadium. Arab explained that they prefer Stade du 5 Juillet because it is their stadium and they know it well, but the other one does not help the supporters. On June 3, 2023, USM Alger became the first Algerian winners of the CAF Confederation Cup despite losing 1–0 at home in the second leg of the final. As rain that began early in the second half became increasingly heavy the match became increasingly scrappy, USMA pocketed a record two million dollars for winning. In the match, Groupe UNITED 1937 attended to set up the largest tifo in Algeria that includes the entire stadium, but it was canceled after a group of MC Alger supporters came and spoiled it, so a battle broke out in the stands with them where the Police rescued them. After the match UNITED 1937 announced the suspension of its activities.

==== Late end of season ====
Coat of arms of the city of Algiers.

On July 4, 2023, the USMA administration strongly denounced in a statement the statements made by the amateur club official in the media Saïd Allik, in which he accuses Groupe SERPORT officials of not respecting justice decisions. The official of the amateur club sued the société sportive par actions of USM Alger in order to remove the symbol of the city of Algiers from the club's logo. It is the symbol that was the subject of ambitions of several capital clubs earlier. Where did justice decide the case in favor of the club sportif amateur (CSA) with a fine of 2 million dinars to the société sportive par actions (SSPA). On the other hand the USMA administration announced that it is committed to removing Algiers state logo from the new shirt that the players will wear starting next August. Saïd Allik responded to Groupe SERPORT's statements and said that the case is old and dates back to the period of the previous owner ETRHB Haddad, and the justice decision was taken three months ago and that the matter is not related to Algiers's logo, but to the club's logo and colors and paying their dues for using this logo.

== Squad list ==
Players and squad numbers last updated on 15 July 2023.
Note: Flags indicate national team as has been defined under FIFA eligibility rules. Players may hold more than one non-FIFA nationality.

No.	Name	Nat.	Position	Date of birth (age)	Signed in	Contract ends	Signed from	Apps	Goals	Transfer fees
Goalkeepers
1	Lamine Zemmamouche	(Algeria)	GK	19 March 1985 (aged 37)	2012	2023	(Algeria) MC Alger	405	1	Free transfer
16	Imad Benchlef	(Algeria)	GK	12 October 1993 (aged 28)	2022	2024	(Algeria) NA Hussein Dey	6	0	Free transfer
25	Oussama Benbot	(Algeria)	GK	11 October 1994 (aged 27)	2021	2024	(Algeria) JS Kabylie	59	0	Free transfer
Defenders
3	Abdelkader Belharrane	(Algeria)	RB	11 August 2000 (aged 22)	2021	2023	(Algeria) CR Belouizdad	12	1	Free transfer
4	Zineddine Belaïd (C.)	(Algeria)	CB	20 March 1999 (aged 23)	2020	2024	(Algeria) NA Hussein Dey	105	10	20,000,000 DA
5	Mustapha Bouchina	(Algeria)	CB	10 August 1991 (aged 31)	2020	2024	(Algeria) Paradou AC	78	1	11,000,000 DA
12	Haithem Loucif	(Algeria)	RB	8 July 1996 (aged 26)	2021	2023	(Algeria) Paradou AC	53	1	Undisclosed
19	Saâdi Radouani (Note: Radouani played previously for USM Alger from 2015 to 2016.)	(Algeria)	RB	18 March 1995 (aged 27)	2020	2024	(Algeria) ES Sétif	83	5	Free transfer
21	Adam Alilet	(Algeria)	CB	17 January 1999 (aged 23)	2019	2024	(Algeria) Reserve team	69	6	Academy Player
22	Houari Baouche	(Algeria)	LB	24 December 1994 (aged 27)	2021	2023	(Algeria) USM Bel Abbès	48	0	Free transfer
27	Ibrahim Bekakchi	(Algeria)	CB	10 January 1992 (aged 30)	2021	2023	(Algeria) ES Sétif	28	0	Free transfer
81	Abdessamed Bounacer	(Algeria)	CB	11 December 2004 (aged 17)	2022	2025	(Algeria) Reserve team	6	0	Academy Player
Midfielders
6	Oussama Chita (V.C.)	(Algeria)	DM	31 October 1996 (aged 25)	2017	2023	(Algeria) MC Alger	138	3	Free transfer
8	Islam Merili	(Algeria)	AM	27 June 1998 (aged 24)	2022	2024	(Algeria) ASO Chlef	37	4	Free transfer
14	Brahim Benzaza	(Algeria)	DM	8 April 1997 (aged 25)	2021	2023	(Algeria) ASO Chlef	52	2	Free transfer
15	Messala Merbah	(Algeria)	DM	22 July 1994 (aged 28)	2021	2023	(Algeria) ES Sétif	35	2	Free transfer
24	Taher Benkhelifa	(Algeria)	DM	10 June 1994 (aged 28)	2020	2024	Unattached	124	3	30,000,000 DA
26	Akram Djahnit	(Algeria)	AM	3 April 1991 (aged 31)	2022	2024	(Algeria) ES Sétif	34	0	Free transfer
72	Mohamed Ait El Hadj	(Algeria)	AM	22 March 2002 (aged 20)	2020	2024	(Algeria) Reserve team	39	3	Academy Player
Forwards
7	Ismail Belkacemi	(Algeria)	LW	24 June 1993 (aged 29)	2020	2023	(Algeria) CS Constantine	98	28	Free transfer
10	Abderrahmane Meziane	(Algeria)	LW	7 March 1994 (aged 28)	2021	2023	(Tunisia) Espérance de Tunis	164	32	Free transfer
11	Abdelkrim Zouari	(Algeria)	RW	14 July 1989 (aged 33)	2018	2023	(Algeria) USM Bel Abbès	117	21	Free transfer
13	Tumisang Orebonye	(Botswana)	ST	26 March 1996 (aged 26)	2023	2025	(Morocco) OC Khouribga	23	1	Free transfer
17	Abdesslem Bouchouareb	(Algeria)	RW	10 December 1997 (aged 24)	2022	2024	(Algeria) NC Magra	15	1	Free transfer
18	Aymen Mahious	(Algeria)	ST	15 September 1997 (aged 24)	2018	2023	(Algeria) AS Aïn M'lila	117	37	Loan return
20	Zakaria Alharaish	(Libya)	RW	23 October 1998 (aged 23)	2022	2024	(Montenegro) Sutjeska Nikšić	15	1	Free transfer
23	Khaled Bousseliou	(Algeria)	LW	3 October 1997 (aged 24)	2022	2024	(Algeria) CR Belouizdad	22	4	Free transfer
35	Khalil Darfalou	(Algeria)	ST	21 June 2001 (aged 21)	2022	2024	(Algeria) ES Sétif	0	0	Free transfer
71	Abderraouf Othmani	(Algeria)	ST	14 June 2001 (aged 21)	2020	2024	(Algeria) Reserve team	35	6	Academy Player

== Transfers ==
=== In ===
==== Summer ====
Date	Pos	Player	From club	Transfer fee	Source
27 June 2022	FW	(Algeria) Abdesslem Bouchouareb	NC Magra	Free transfer	
30 June 2022	AM	(Algeria) Abderrahmane Bacha	JS Bordj Ménaïel	Free transfer	
1 July 2022	LB	(Algeria) Mehdi Beneddine	(France) Châteauroux	Loan return	
1 July 2022	LB	(Algeria) Anis Khemaissia	USM Annaba	Loan return	
1 July 2022	GK	(Algeria) Abdelmoumen Sifour	RC Arbaâ	Loan return	
2 July 2022	DF	(Algeria) Abdelkader Belharrane	Reserve team	First Professional Contract	
2 July 2022	MF	(Algeria) Mohamed Djenidi	Reserve team	First Professional Contract	
2 July 2022	GK	(Algeria) Imad Benchlef	NA Hussein Dey	Free transfer	
17 July 2022	CB	(Algeria) Abdessamed Bounacer	Reserve team	First Professional Contract	
18 July 2022	FW	(Algeria) Samy Bouali	Reserve team	First Professional Contract	
18 July 2022	LB	(Algeria) Aymen Kennan	Reserve team	First Professional Contract	
18 July 2022	MF	(Algeria) Mostafa Bekane	Reserve team	First Professional Contract	
20 July 2022	FW	(Algeria) Khaled Bousseliou	CR Belouizdad	Free transfer	
27 July 2022	FW	(Algeria) Khalil Darfalou	ES Sétif	Free transfer	
11 August 2022	FW	(Libya) Zakaria Alharaish	(Montenegro) Sutjeska Nikšić	Free transfer	
22 August 2022	MF	(Algeria) Akram Djahnit	ES Sétif	Free transfer	

==== Winter ====
Date	Pos	Player	From club	Transfer fee	Source
1 February 2023	FW	(Botswana) Tumisang Orebonye	(Morocco) OC Khouribga	Free transfer	

=== Out ===
==== Summer ====
Date	Pos	Player	To club	Transfer fee	Source
23 June 2022	GK	(Algeria) Alexis Guendouz	Unattached (Note: Guendouz joined CR Belouizdad on 14 July 2022.)	Free transfer	
2 July 2022	MF	(Algeria) Taher Benkhelifa	Unattached	Free transfer (Released)	
3 July 2022	RB	(Algeria) Fateh Achour	Unattached (Note: Achour joined ASO Chlef on 29 July 2022.)	Free transfer	
5 July 2022	CB	(Algeria) Abderrahim Hamra	Unattached	Free transfer	
5 July 2022	RW	(Algeria) Ibrahim Chenihi	Unattached	Free transfer (Released)	
5 July 2022	GK	(Algeria) Abdelmoumen Sifour	RC Arbaâ	Released	
14 July 2022	MF	(Algeria) Hamza Koudri	Unattached	Free transfer	
30 July 2022	MF	(Algeria) Kamel Belarbi	ASO Chlef	Free transfer (Released)	
6 August 2022	FW	(Ghana) Kwame Opoku	(Saudi Arabia) Najran SC	Loan for one year	
23 August 2022	LB	(Algeria) Anis Khemaissia	HB Chelghoum Laïd	Free transfer	

==== Winter ====
Date	Pos	Player	To club	Transfer fee	Source
29 January 2022	FW	(Burkina Faso) Hamed Belem	Unattached	Free transfer (Released)	
1 February 2023	LB	(Algeria) Mehdi Beneddine	Unattached	Free transfer (Released)	
1 February 2023	FW	(Ghana) Kwame Opoku	(Morocco) Olympique Khouribga	Free transfer (Released)	
5 February 2023	FW	(Algeria) Abderrahmane Bacha	USM Khenchela	Loan for six months	

=== New contracts ===
No.	Pos	Player	Contract length	Contract end	Date	Source
5	CB	(Algeria) Mustapha Bouchina	2 years	2024	30 June 2022	
19	RB	(Algeria) Saâdi Radouani	2 years	2024	30 June 2022	
24	MF	(Algeria) Taher Benkhelifa	2 years	2024	11 August 2022	

== Pre-season and friendlies ==
30 July 2022 Friendly	USM Alger	2–0	Algeria U23	Bologhine
18:00	Mahious 10'; Alilet 37'			Stadium: Omar Hamadi Stadium
Note: Lineup for USM Alger; First half - Benbot, Loucif, Beneddine, Alilet, Belaïd, Chita, Merbah, Bouchouareb, Belkacemi, Meziane, Mahious. Second half - Benchlef, Radouani, Baouche, Bouchina, Alilet, Merbah (Bekane ?'), Chita (Djenidi ?'), Zouari, Meziane (Belharrane ?'), Belkacemi (Bacha ?'), Bousseliou.

6 August 2022 Friendly	USM Alger	2–2	JS Saoura	Bologhine
18:30	Belkacemi 12'; Bacha 38'		Mellal 10' (pen.); Mebarki 68'	Stadium: Omar Hamadi Stadium
Note: Lineup for USM Alger; First half - Benbot, Radouani, Baouche, Bouchina, Alilet, Chita, Merbah, Belkacemi, Bacha, Bousseliou, Zouari. Second half - Benchlef, Loucif, Beneddine, Bekakchi, Belaïd, Belharrane (Darfalou 73'), Merili, Djenidi (Bekane 70'), Mahious, Meziane, Bouchouareb.

10 August 2022 Friendly	USM Alger (Algeria)	8–0	(Ivory Coast) Foot Africa Inter	Tunis, Tunisia
17:30 UTC+1	Mahious 3', 21', 45'; Meziane 8'; Bouchina 11'; Bousseliou 45+4'; Bacha 82'; Chita 88'			Stadium: Stade annexe Hammadi Agrebi

13 August 2022 Friendly	Club Africain (Tunisia)	0–3	(Algeria) USM Alger	Tunis, Tunisia
17:30 UTC+1		Report	Bousseliou 11'; Meziane 21'; Mahious 56' (pen.)	Stadium: Parc Mounir Kebaili
Note: Lineup for USM Alger - Benbot (Benchlef 58'), Radouani (Loucif 70'), Bouchina, Belaïd, Baouche (Bekakchi 70'), Merbah (Chita 46'), Chita (Merili 30'), (Merbah 70'), Bousseliou (Bouchouareb 30'), Zouari (Meziane 80'), Meziane (Bacha 70'), Bacha (Mahious 47').

14 August 2022 Friendly	ES Hammam-Sousse (Tunisia)	2–2	(Algeria) USM Alger	Hammam Sousse, Tunisia
17:30 UTC+1	Mahious 35'; Alharaish 85' (pen.)			Stadium: Stade Bou-Ali Lahouar
Note: Lineup for USM Alger - First half - Benchlef, Loucif, Beneddine, Bekakchi, Alilet, Djenidi (Chita ?'), Bekane (Meziane ?'), Bouchouareb, Mahious, Belkacemi, Benkhelifa. Second half - Zemmamouche, Belharrane, Baouche, Alilet (Belaïd 70'), Belhadj Qasim, Chita (Merili 70'), Merbah, Meziane (Bekane 70'), Bacha, Alharaish, Darfalou.

17 August 2022 Friendly	AS Marsa (Tunisia)	1–3	(Algeria) USM Alger	La Marsa, Tunisia
17:00 UTC+1			Bacha 5'; Belkacemi 15'; Mahious 50'	Stadium: Stade Abdelaziz Chtioui
Note: Lineup for USM Alger - First half - Benbot, Radouani, Baouche, Alilet, Belaïd, Chita, Benkhelifa, Meziane, Zouari, Belkacemi, Bacha. Second half - Zemmamouche (Azri 67'), Loucif, Bekakchi, Bouchina, Belhadj Qasim, Merbah, Merili, Bouchouareb, Mahious (Bacha 85'), Belkacemi (Zouari 65'), Meziane (Alharaish 65').

13 September 2022 Friendly	USM Blida	1–2	USM Alger	Blida
17:00	Ayoub Belmiloud		Belaïd 22'; Loucif 90'	Stadium: Brakni Brothers Stadium
Note: Lineup for USM Alger - First half - Benchlef (Zemmamouche 30'), Radouani (Loucif 30'), Baouche (Belharrane 30'), Belaïd (Bekakchi 30'), Alilet (Bouchina 30'), Merbah (Benkhelifa 30'), Chita (Merili 30'), Djahnit (Belkacemi 30'), Alharaish (Ait El Hadj 30'), Mahious (Bacha 30'), Meziane (Bousseliou 40'). Second half - Zemmamouche (Benbot 60'), Radouani, Bekakchi, Alilet (Bouchina 70'), Belaïd (Belem 70'), Benkhelifa, Merbah (Chita 70'), Djahnit (Ait El Hadj 62'), Alharaish, Belkacemi (Belhadj Qasim 70'), Bacha.

20 September 2022 Friendly	USM Alger	2–1	ESM Koléa	Dar El Beïda
16:30	Belem 11'; Othmani 13'			Stadium: Omar Benrabah Stadium
Note: Lineup for USM Alger - First half - ?. Second half - Benchlef, Belharrane, Baouche, Bekakchi, Bouchina, Benzaza, Bekane, Neamani, Bouali, Bouchouareb, Othmani.

27 October 2022 Friendly	USM Alger	0–2	NA Hussein Dey	Bologhine
17:00		Report		Stadium: Omar Hamadi Stadium
Note: Lineup for USM Alger - First half - Zemmamouche, Beneddine, Belharrane, Alilet, Bekakchi, Loucif, Merili, Benzaza, Bacha, Bouchouareb, Bousseliou. Second half - Benchlef, Belharrane, Beneddine, Bekakchi, Alilet, Merili, Bouali, Loucif, Alharaish, Bouchouareb, Mekhbat.

== Competitions ==
=== Overview ===
Competition	Record								Started round	Final position / round	First match	Last match
Competition	G	W	D	L	GF	GA	GD	Win %	Started round	Final position / round	First match	Last match
Ligue 1	30	11	7	12	31	30	+1	36.67	—N/a	11th	27 August 2022	15 July 2023
Algerian Cup	1	0	1	0	2	2	+0	0.00	Round of 64		15 February 2023	
Confederation Cup	16	9	4	3	24	11	+13	56.25	Second round	Winners	9 October 2022	3 June 2023
Total	47	20	12	15	57	43	+14	42.55				

Updated to match played 15 July 2023
Source: Competitions

=== Ligue 1 ===
==== League table ====
Pos	Team	Pld	W	D	L	GF	GA	GD	Pts	Qualification or relegation
9	Paradou AC	30	11	8	11	35	33	+2	41	
10	MC Oran	30	11	8	11	27	34	−7	41	
11	USM Alger	30	11	7	12	31	30	+1	40	Qualification for CAF Confederation Cup (Note: USMA Alger qualified for the 2023–24 CAF Confederation Cup as the title holders.)
12	US Biskra	30	10	10	10	30	29	+1	40	
13	NC Magra	30	11	7	12	35	36	−1	40	

Updated to match(es) played on 15 July 2023. Source: the-sports.org
Rules for classification: 1) points; 2) head-to-head points; 3) head-to-head goal difference; 4) goal difference; 5) total goals; 6) fairplay ranking; 7) playoff.

==== Results summary ====
Overall								Home						Away					
Pld	W	D	L	GF	GA	GD	Pts	W	D	L	GF	GA	GD	W	D	L	GF	GA	GD
30	11	7	12	31	30	+1	40	9	5	1	22	9	+13	2	2	11	9	21	−12

Last updated: 15 July 2023.
Source: Competitive matches

==== Results by round ====
Round	1	2	3	4	5	6	7	8	9	10	11	12	13	14	15	16	17	18	19	20	21	22	23	24	25	26	27	28	29	30
Ground	H	A	H	A	H	A	H	A	H	A	H	A	H	A	H	A	H	A	H	A	H	A	H	A	H	A	H	A	H	A
Result	W	W	W	W	W	L	D	L	D	L	W	D	D	L	W	D	W	L	W	L	D	L	W	L	W	L	D	L	L	L
Position	7	3	3	2	1	1	1	2	2	4	4	5	4	6	3	4	3	6	4	4	4	5	3	4	4	5	5	7	9	11

Updated to match(es) played on 15 July 2023. Source: Competitive matches
A = Away; H = Home; W = Win; D = Draw; L = Loss

==== Matches ====
The league fixtures were announced on 19 July 2022.

27 August 2022 Round 1	USM Alger	1–0	MC El Bayadh	Dar El Beïda
17:00	Merbah 41'	Report	Berriah (yellow card) 26'; Embarek (yellow card) 45'; Allati (yellow card) 64'	Stadium: Omar Benrabah Stadium; Referee: Youcef Gamouh; Assistant referees: Rachid Tamrabet, Bilal Belout; Fourth official: Amine Hansal

2 September 2022 Round 2	USM Khenchela	0–1	USM Alger	Khenchela
16:30	Baakoh (yellow card) 65'; Bayazid (yellow card) 70'; Sameur (yellow card) 73'	Report	Belaïd 6'; Alharaish (yellow card) 68'	Stadium: Amar Hamam Stadium; Referee: Mustapha Ghorbal; Assistant referees: Abdelhak Etchiali, Akram Sohbi; Fourth official: Ahmed Daas

6 September 2022 Round 3	USM Alger	1–0	JS Kabylie	Dar El Beïda
16:30	Meziane 72'; Othmani (yellow card) 90+2'	Report	Nasri (yellow card) 19'	Stadium: Omar Benrabah Stadium; Referee: Nabil Boukhalfa; Assistant referees: Akram Zerhouni, Yacine Ouerd Benslama; Fourth official: Anes Azrine

17 September 2022 Round 4	HB Chelghoum Laïd	1–3	USM Alger	Chelghoum Laïd
16:30	Litt 81'	Report	Mahious 54'; Benkhelifa (yellow card) 73'; Benbot (yellow card) 79'; Bacha 89'; Radouani 90+4'	Stadium: 11 December 1961 Stadium; Referee: Lahlou Benbrahem; Assistant referees: Amirouche Boufassa, Azzedine Rahmoune; Fourth official: Mohamed Boussadia

2 October 2022 Round 6	MC Oran	1–0	USM Alger	Oran
20:00	Benayad (yellow card) 4'; Belaribi (yellow card) 28'; Khadir (yellow card) 42' (goal) 61'; Abed Abbassi (yellow card) 89'; Belahouel (red card) 90+6'	Report	Benkhelifa (yellow card) 29'; Alilet (red card) 90+6'	Stadium: Ahmed Zabana Stadium; Referee: Mehdi Abid Charef; Assistant referees: Antar Boulfelfel, Walid Saâdi; Fourth official: Mohamed Sahouadj

21 October 2022 Round 9	USM Alger	1–1	JS Saoura	Dar El Beïda
15:00	Bouchina (yellow card) 2'; Belkacemi (yellow card) 17'; Mahious 19'; Baouche (yellow card) 75'	Report	Bangoura (yellow card) 2'; Bouziani (yellow card) 8'; Akacem (yellow card) 31'; Baaziz (yellow card) 39'; Amrane 67'; Saidi (yellow card) 90+3'	Stadium: Omar Benrabah Stadium; Referee: Mustapha Ghorbal; Assistant referees: Abdelhak Etchiali, Mokrane Gourari; Fourth official: Bilel Soltani

25 October 2022 Round 5	USM Alger	2–1	Paradou AC	Dar El Beïda
15:00	Douar 2' (o.g.); Meziane 25' (yellow card) 71'; Belaïd (yellow card) 37'; Benbot (yellow card) 86'	Report	Aoued 65'	Stadium: Omar Benrabah Stadium; Referee: Hamza Bouslimani; Assistant referees: El Habib Belbachir, Nacereddine Ouazza; Fourth official: Amine Hansal

29 November 2022 Round 12	NC Magra	1–1	USM Alger	Magra
15:00	Djahnit (yellow card) 16'; Daoud (yellow card) 39'; Ghanem 66' (pen.)	Report	Ait El Hadj (yellow card) 29'; Radouani 50'; Alilet (yellow card) 58'; Meziane (yellow card) 70'	Stadium: Boucheligue Brothers Stadium; Referee: Houssam Benyahia; Assistant referees: Samir Bioud, Mohamed Hamaidi; Fourth official: Abdenour Khalfallah

3 December 2022 Round 7	USM Alger	1–1	ES Sétif	Dar El Beïda
15:00	Zouari 76'; Baouche (yellow card) 90+1'	Report	Guenaoui (yellow card) 26'; Tabti (yellow card) 58'; Kendouci 68'; Benamrane (yellow card) 90+3'	Stadium: Omar Benrabah Stadium; Attendance: 0 (close doors); Referee: Bilel Soltani; Assistant referees: Soufiane Cherif Zaatri, Ahmed Benterzi; Fourth official: Amine Sekhraoui

7 December 2022 Round 13	USM Alger	2–2	CR Belouizdad	Dar El Beïda
15:00	Merili 4' (yellow card) 66'; Meziane 14'	Report	Belkhir 39' (yellow card) 40'; Bourdim 70'; Bouras (yellow card) 73'; Bouchar (yellow card) 73'; Draoui (yellow card) 80'	Stadium: Omar Benrabah Stadium; Referee: Lahlou Benbraham; Assistant referees: Brahim Hamlaoui, Adel Abane; Fourth official: Massinissa Serdjane

11 December 2022 Round 14	ASO Chlef	2–1	USM Alger	Relizane
15:00	Souibaâh 29', 65'; Kerroum (yellow card) 70'; Fettouhi (yellow card) 90'	Report	Alilet (yellow card) 21'; Chita 38'	Stadium: Tahar Zoughari Stadium; Referee: Akram Mecharia; Assistant referees: Fayçal Djemaa, Abdelhafid Madi; Fourth official: Youcef Tayeb Bouderbali

20 December 2022 Round 8	MC Alger	1–0	USM Alger	Algiers
15:00	Benabdi 67' (yellow card) 68'; Debbih (yellow card) 89'	Report	Radouani (yellow card) 82'	Stadium: Stade du 5 Juillet; Referee: Lotfi Bekouassa; Assistant referees: Mohamed Serradj, Adel Abane; Fourth official: Lahlou Benbraham

24 December 2022 Round 15	USM Alger	2–1	CS Constantine	Dar El Beïda
14:30	Ait El Hadj 42'; Mahious 79' (pen.); Merili (yellow card) 80'	Report	Aiboud 66'; Chekal (yellow card) 77'; Madani (yellow card) 85'; Maâmeri (yellow card) 89'	Stadium: Omar Benrabah Stadium; Referee: Youcef Tayeb Bouderbali; Assistant referees: Mehdi Walid Benali, Youcef Sohbi; Fourth official: Hamlaoui Brahim

28 December 2022 Round 10	US Biskra	1–0	USM Alger	Biskra
17:00	Boussalem 3'; Lakhdari (yellow card) 37'; Khoualed (yellow card) 75'; Dakhia (yellow card) 90+3'	Report	Benzaza (yellow card) 59'	Stadium: 18 February Stadium; Referee: Abdellah Benchehida; Assistant referees: Mourad Berrahma, Amine Belaroussi; Fourth official: Adel Facih

8 February 2023 Round 11	USM Alger	3–0	RC Arbaâ	Dar El Beïda
15:00	Alilet 27'; Merili 54'; Mahious 66' (pen.)	Report	Brahmi (yellow card) 55'; Chaaraoui (yellow card) 64'	Stadium: Omar Benrabah Stadium; Referee: Abdelali Ibrir; Assistant referees: Lamine Chellali, Mehdi Belkacem; Fourth official: Lamia Athmane

3 March 2023 Round 16	MC El Bayadh	0–0	USM Alger	El Bayadh
15:00	Benzid (yellow card) 32'; Kouar (yellow card) 75'	Report	Baouche (yellow card) 30'; Benkhelifa (yellow card) 53' (yellow-red card) 90+3'; Chita (yellow card) 60'	Stadium: Zakaria Medjdoub Stadium; Referee: Youcef Gamouh; Assistant referees: Mohamed Benamira, Haytem Bouima; Fourth official: Mohamed Kralifa

13 March 2023 Round 19	USM Alger	3–0	HB Chelghoum Laïd	Dar El Beïda
15:00	Bouchouareb 46'; Mahious 50', 67' (yellow card) 90'	Report	Zouad (yellow card) 90'	Stadium: Omar Benrabah Stadium; Referee: Ahmed Benhamou; Assistant referees: Oussama Arafa, Mourad Benhamou; Fourth official: Lamia Athmane

8 April 2023 Round 22	ES Sétif	1–0	USM Alger	Sétif
22:00	Bouchama 59' (yellow card) 60'; Ziti (yellow card) 62'; Bouhalfaya (yellow card) 90+1'	Report	Zouari (yellow card) 26'; Radouani (yellow card) 66'	Stadium: 8 May 1945 Stadium; Referee: Houssam Benyahia; Assistant referees: Samir Bioud, Mohamed Hamaidi; Fourth official: Haithem Ghouti

12 April 2023 Round 17	USM Alger	2–0	USM Khenchela	Algiers
22:30	Alilet 15'; Benzaza 34'; Merili (yellow card) 52'; Chita (yellow card) 80'; Orebonye (yellow card) 84'	Report		Stadium: Stade du 5 Juillet; Attendance: 0 (close doors); Referee: Nabil Boukhalfa; Assistant referees: Akram Sohbi, Djilali Hallem; Fourth official: Abderahmane Belkebir

5 May 2023 Round 18	JS Kabylie	1–0	USM Alger	Tizi Ouzou
18:00	Boukhanchouche 33' (yellow card) 85'; Medjadel (yellow card) 90+6'	Report	Alilet (yellow card) 34'; Merili (yellow card) 36'	Stadium: 1 November 1954 Stadium; Referee: Abdelmoumen Touabti; Assistant referees: Hamza Bouzit, Badreddine Bellaghema; Fourth official: Anes Azrine

21 May 2023 Round 20	Paradou AC	2–1	USM Alger	Dar El Beïda
16:00	Mokeddem 31'; Boulbina (yellow card) 82'; Bouzida 90+6'	Report	Bouchina (yellow card) 28'; Bouchouareb (yellow card) 39'; Alharaish 53'; Belharrane (yellow card) 57'; Benkhelifa (yellow card) 71'; Othmani (yellow card) 90'; Baouche (yellow card) 90+4'	Stadium: Omar Benrabah Stadium; Referee: Redouane Allou; Assistant referees: Mokrane Gourari, Djafar Bentarzi; Fourth official: Rachid Kebaili

7 June 2023 Round 25	USM Alger	1–0	US Biskra	Dar El Beïda
16:30	Belaïd (yellow card) 14' (goal) 90'; Loucif (yellow card) 90'	Report	Boufligha (yellow card) 38'; Adouane (yellow card) 42'; Ouabdi (yellow card) 86'	Stadium: Omar Benrabah Stadium; Referee: Mohamed Saidi; Assistant referees: Yassine Tadji, Ahmed Islem Raja; Fourth official: Lamia Athmane

10 June 2023 Round 21	USM Alger	0–0	MC Oran	Baraki
17:00		Report	Benayad (yellow card) 31'; Khadir (yellow card) 77'; Della (yellow card) 90+4'	Stadium: Nelson Mandela Stadium; Referee: Akram Mechairia; Assistant referees: Fayçal Djemaa, Anouar Ghazli; Fourth official: Malek Aït Ameur

23 June 2023 Round 23	USM Alger	2–0	MC Alger	Baraki
18:00	Belkacemi 40'; Loucif 63' (yellow card) 90+6'	Report		Stadium: Nelson Mandela Stadium; Referee: Houssem Benyahia; Assistant referees: Samir Bioud, Mohamed Hamaidi; Fourth official: Anes Azrine

27 June 2023 Round 24	JS Saoura	2–0	USM Alger	Béchar
19:00	Mellel 22'; Baaziz (yellow card) 34'; Saâd (yellow card) 58'; Hammia 90' (pen.)	Report	Meziane (yellow card) 29'; Alilet (yellow card) 40'; Benzaza (yellow card) 63'; Radouani (yellow card) 79'	Stadium: 20 August 1955 Stadium; Referee: Abdelmoumen Touabti; Assistant referees: Hamza Bouzit, Badreddine Bellaghema; Fourth official: Oussama Boumesjed

1 July 2023 Round 26	RC Arbaâ	2–1	USM Alger	Larbaâ
17:00	Toumi 45+3', 69' (pen.); Benlaribi (yellow card) 58'; Sifour (yellow card) 89'	Report	Bouchouareb (yellow card) 19'; Benkhelifa (yellow card) 44'; Belaïd 66' (pen.)	Stadium: Ismaïl Makhlouf Stadium; Referee: Abdelali Ibrir; Assistant referees: Lamine Chellali, Mehdi Belkacem; Fourth official: Oussama Makfoudji

4 July 2023 Round 27	USM Alger	0–0	NC Magra	Rouïba
17:00	Belaïd (red card) 47'; Zouari (yellow card) 85'	Report	Djahnit (yellow card) 47'; Amrane (yellow card) 69'	Stadium: Salem Mabrouki Stadium; Referee: Bilal Bendjahene; Assistant referees: Yacine Ouerd Benslama, Djilali Hallam; Fourth official: Mohamed Belkebir

7 July 2023 Round 28	CR Belouizdad	3–1	USM Alger	Belouizdad
17:15	Wamba 45+1' (pen.) (yellow card) 60'; Chikhi 53'; Belkhir 69'	Report	Benbot (yellow card) 8'; Belkacemi 25'; Bekakchi (yellow card) 44'; Alilet (yellow card) 45'	Stadium: 20 August 1955 Stadium; Referee: Mohamed Amine Benzohra; Assistant referees: Sofiane Cherif Zaatri, Salim Chamby; Fourth official: Amine Hansal

10 July 2023 Round 29	USM Alger	1–3	ASO Chlef	Rouïba
17:15	Othmani 10'; Djahnit (yellow card) 20'	Report	Debbari 33' (yellow card) 69'; Aliane 53'; Souibaâh 53'	Stadium: Salem Mabrouki Stadium; Referee: Mehadji Tayeb Bouderbali; Assistant referees: Houari Laribi, Mustapha Kessar; Fourth official: Mohamed Benkhalef

15 July 2023 Round 30	CS Constantine	3–0	USM Alger	Constantine
17:15	Maâmeri 14'; Dib 33' (pen.); Khaldi 77'	Report		Stadium: Ramadane Ben Abdelmalek Stadium; Referee: Abdellah Benchehida; Assistant referees: Mourad Berrahma, Lahcen Mesbah; Fourth official: Mohamed Amine Ayad

=== Algerian Cup ===
15 February 2023 Round of 64	IRB Maghnia	2–2 (a.e.t.) (5–4 p)	USM Alger	Maghnia
14:00	Benbakhti (yellow card) 15'; Megataâ 2', 32'; Fliti (yellow card) 39'; Benkamla (yellow card) 59'; Nasri (yellow card) 72'; Faroui (yellow card) 82' Ferroui, Baghdadi, Belmir (substituted off) 67' (Nemiche, (substituted on) 67'), Benbakhti, Harrigui, Khireddine (substituted off) 92' (Makantar, (substituted on) 92'), Chafai (substituted off) 77' (Malou, (substituted on) 77'), Benkamla, Nasri (substituted off) 72' (Hamsas, (substituted on) 72'), Fliti, Megataâ	Report	Benzaza (yellow card) 58'; Mahious 68'; Othmani 85' Zemmamouche, Loucif, Baouche, Bekakchi (substituted off) 46' (Bouchina, (substituted on) 46'), Alilet, Chita (substituted off) 46' (Bousseliou, (substituted on) 46'), Merili (substituted off) 46' (Benkhelifa, (substituted on) 46'), Benzaza, Ait El Hadj (substituted off) 80' (Bouchouareb, (substituted on) 80'), Belkacemi (substituted off) 69' (Othmani, (substituted on) 69'), Mahious (substituted off) 110' (Belharrane, (substituted on) 110').	Stadium: Nouali Brothers Stadium; Referee: Walid Lahreche; Assistant referees: Beskri, Assasi
	Penalties
	? (penalty scored) ? (penalty scored) ? (penalty scored) ? (penalty missed) ? (penalty scored) ? (penalty scored)		(penalty scored) Alilet; (penalty scored) Othmani; (penalty scored) Belharrane; (penalty missed) Bousseliou; (penalty scored) Bouchina; (penalty missed) Benkhelifa

=== Confederation Cup ===
==== Qualifying rounds ====
In the qualifying rounds, each tie will be played on a home-and-away two-legged basis. If the aggregate score will be tied after the second leg, the away goals rule was applied, and if still tied, extra time will not be played, and the penalty shoot-out will be used to determine the winner (Regulations III. 13 & 14).

===== Second round =====
9 October 2022 First leg	ASC Kara (Togo)	0–2	(Algeria) USM Alger	Lomé
16:00 UTC+0	Ougadja (yellow card) 29'; Bode (yellow card) 68'	Report	Issaka 20' (o.g.); Mahious 47' (pen.)	Stadium: Stade de Kégué; Referee: Jean Ouattara (Burkina Faso); Assistant referees: Seydou Tiama, Habib Oumar Sanou (Burkina Faso); Fourth official: Vincent Kabore (Burkina Faso)

16 October 2022 Second leg	USM Alger (Algeria)	2–1 (4–1 agg.)	(Togo) ASC Kara	Sétif
19:00 UTC+1	Meziane 36', 53'	Report	Ouro-Ayeva (yellow card) 55' (goal) 58'	Stadium: 8 May 1945 Stadium; Referee: Muhammad Elmabrouk (Libya); Assistant referees: Basm Saef Elnaser, Ibrahim Bukouz (Libya); Fourth official: Abdulbasit Shuhoub (Libya)

===== Play-off round =====
2 November 2022 First leg	Cape Town City (South Africa)	0–0	(Algeria) USM Alger	Cape Town
18:00 UTC+2	Nodada (yellow card) 35'; Mkhize (yellow card) 61'	Report		Stadium: Cape Town Stadium; Referee: Samuel Uwikunda (Rwanda); Assistant referees: Dieudonne Mutuyimana, Justin Karangwa (Rwanda); Fourth official: Jean Claude Ishimwe (Rwanda)

9 November 2022 Second leg	USM Alger (Algeria)	1–0 (1–0 agg.)	(South Africa) Cape Town City	Sétif
18:00 UTC+1	Alilet (yellow card) 62'; Merili 90'; Ait El Hadj (yellow card) 90+3'	Report	Makola (yellow card) 30'; Ambina (yellow card) 66'; Goedeman (yellow card) 69'; Van Heerden (yellow card) 77'; Mpandle (yellow card) 81'	Stadium: 8 May 1945 Stadium; Referee: Aklesso Gnama (Togo); Assistant referees: Komlan Adiwotso, Koffi Ahonto (Togo); Fourth official: Kouassi Attisso Attiogbe (Togo)

==== Group stage ====
The draw for the group stage was held on 12 December 2022, 11:00 GMT (13:00 local time, UTC+2), at the CAF headquarters in Cairo, Egypt. The 16 winners of the play-off round of qualifying were drawn into four groups of four.

The teams were seeded by their performances in the CAF competitions for the previous five seasons (CAF 5-year ranking points shown next to every team). Each group contained one team from each of Pot 1, Pot 2, Pot 3, and Pot 4 and each team was allocated to the positions in their group according to their pot.

Pos	Team	Pld	W	D	L	GF	GA	GD	Pts	Qualification	MAG	USM	LUP	AKH
1	(South Africa) Marumo Gallants	6	4	0	2	12	10	+2	12	Advance to knockout stage	—	2–0	3–2	4–1
2	(Algeria) USM Alger	6	3	2	1	11	5	+6	11	Advance to knockout stage	2–0	—	3–0	4–1
3	(Democratic Republic of the Congo) Saint-Éloi Lupopo	6	1	2	3	6	10	−4	5 (Note: Head-to-head points: Saint-Éloi Lupopo 4, Al Akhdar 1)		1–2	1–1	—	1–0
4	(Libya) Al Akhdar	6	1	2	3	8	12	−4	5		4–1	1–1	1–1	—

Source: CAF
Notes:

12 February 2023 Matchday 1	USM Alger (Algeria)	3–0	(Democratic Republic of the Congo) Saint-Éloi Lupopo	Algiers
20:00 UTC+1	Bousseliou 7', 65' (yellow card) 59'; Mahious 82'; Merili (yellow card) 90+4'	Report	Miché (yellow card) 45+3'; Tchatakora (yellow card) 68'	Stadium: Stade du 5 Juillet; Referee: Jean Ouattara (Burkina Faso); Assistant referees: Seydou Tiama, Habib Oumar Sanou (Burkina Faso); Fourth official: Benoit Bado (Burkina Faso)

19 February 2023 Matchday 2	Al Akhdar (Libya)	1–1	(Algeria) USM Alger	Benina
18:00 UTC+2	Shafshuf 67' (pen.) (yellow card) 68'; Qassim (yellow card) 81'	Report	Orebonye (yellow card) 24' (goal) 77'; Alilet (yellow card) 65'; Benkhelifa (yellow card) 74'	Stadium: Martyrs of February Stadium; Referee: Haythem Guirat (Tunisia); Assistant referees: Yamen Malloulchi, Wael Hannachi (Tunisia); Fourth official: Amir Lousif (Tunisia)

26 February 2023 Matchday 3	USM Alger (Algeria)	2–0	(South Africa) Marumo Gallants	Algiers
20:00 UTC+1	Meziane 39'; Chita (yellow card) 27'; Benzaza (yellow card) 68'; Belaïd 89'	Report	Manaka (yellow card) 7'	Stadium: Stade du 5 Juillet; Referee: Alhadi Allaou Mahamat (Chad); Assistant referees: Issa Yaya, Bogola Issa (Chad); Fourth official: Pousri Armi Alfred (Chad)

8 March 2023 Matchday 4	Marumo Gallants (South Africa)	2–0	(Algeria) USM Alger	Johannesburg
15:00 UTC+2	Nku 7'; Ngema (yellow card) 43'; Koapeng 75'	Report	Alilet (yellow card) 43'; Benkhelifa (yellow card) 59'; Belkacemi (yellow card) 73'; Alharaish (yellow card) 86'	Stadium: Dobsonville Stadium; Attendance: 0 (close doors) (Note: Marumo Gallants vs USM Alger for the Matchday 4 of the CAF Confederation Cup will take place behind closed doors for security reasons.); Referee: Samuel Uwikunda (Rwanda); Assistant referees: Dieudonne Mutuyimana, Justin Karangwa (Rwanda); Fourth official: Nsoro Ruzindana (Rwanda)

19 March 2023 Matchday 5	Saint-Éloi Lupopo (Democratic Republic of the Congo)	1–1	(Algeria) USM Alger	Ndola (Zambia)
15:00 UTC+2	Aubiang 72'	Report	Benkhelifa (yellow card) 20'; Bounacer (yellow card) 43'; Kateregga 90' (o.g.)	Stadium: Levy Mwanawasa Stadium; Referee: Patrice Milazare (Mauritius); Assistant referees: Hensley Danny Petrousse (Seychelles), Aswet Teeluck (Mauritius); Fourth official: Dharamveer Hurbungs (Mauritius)

2 April 2023 Matchday 6	USM Alger (Algeria)	4–1	(Libya) Al Akhdar	Algiers
21:00 UTC+1	Belaïd 9' (pen.); Alilet 20' (pen.), 75' (yellow card) 89'; Mahious 36' (yellow card) 44'; Bouchouareb (yellow card) 76'	Report	Alraheem (yellow card) 18'; Qassim (yellow card) 19'; Shafshuf 65'; Mohamadi (yellow card) 90'	Stadium: Stade du 5 Juillet; Referee: Mahmoud El Banna (Egypt); Assistant referees: Youssef Elbosaty, Samy Halhal (Egypt); Fourth official: Ahmed Ghandour (Egypt)

==== knockout stage ====
The bracket was decided after the draw for the knockout stage (quarter-finals, semi-finals and finals), which was held on 5 April 2023, 18:30 GMT (20:30 local time, UTC+2), at the CAF headquarters in Cairo, Egypt.

===== Quarter-finals =====
23 April 2023 First leg	USM Alger (Algeria)	2–0	(Morocco) AS FAR	Algiers
20:00 UTC+1	Radouani 44'; Benzaza (yellow card) 58'; Belaïd 62'; Loucif (yellow card) 82'; Bouchina (yellow card) 90'	Report	Naji (yellow card) 73'; Diney (yellow card) 90+9'; Slim (red card) 90+12'	Stadium: Stade du 5 Juillet; Referee: Ahmad Heeralall (Mauritius); Assistant referees: Hensley Petrousse (Seychelles), Soulaimane Amaldine (Comoros); Fourth official: Patrice Milazare (Mauritius)

30 April 2023 Second leg	AS FAR (Morocco)	3–2 (3–4 agg.)	(Algeria) USM Alger	Rabat
20:00 UTC+1	Chita 8' (o.g.); Emmanuel (yellow card) 35'; Diney 60'; Hrimat 90+7' (pen.); Diakite (yellow card) 90+11'	Report	Radouani 12'; Benzaza (yellow card) 21'; Alilet (yellow card) 45+3'; Bouchina (yellow card) 64'; Bousseliou 78' (yellow card) 79'; Benbot (yellow card) 90+6'; Belkacemi (yellow card) 90+10'	Stadium: Prince Moulay Abdellah Stadium; Referee: Mohamed Marouf Eid Mansour (Egypt); Assistant referees: Youssef Elbosaty, Samy Halhal (Egypt); Fourth official: Ahmed Naji (Egypt)

===== Semi-finals =====
10 May 2023 First leg	ASEC Mimosas (Ivory Coast)	0–0	(Algeria) USM Alger	Bouaké
16:00 UTC+0	Zougrana (yellow card) 70'	Report	Bousseliou (yellow card) 85'	Stadium: Stade Bouaké (Note: ASEC Mimosas play their knockout stage home matches at Stade Bouaké, Bouaké, instead of their regular home stadium Stade Félix Houphouët-Boigny, Abidjan, which is in the process of renovations in preparation for Ivory Coast hosting 2023 Africa Cup of Nations.); Referee: Alhadi Allaou Mahamat (Chad); Assistant referees: Issa Yaya (Chad), Elvis Nguegoue (Cameroon); Fourth official: Djindo Louis Houngnandande (Benin)

17 May 2023 Second leg	USM Alger (Algeria)	2–0 (2–0 agg.)	(Ivory Coast) ASEC Mimosas	Algiers
20:00 UTC+1	Bousseliou 28'; Zouari (yellow card) 49'; Belkacemi 80'	Report		Stadium: Stade du 5 Juillet; Referee: Pierre Ghislain Atcho (Gabon); Assistant referees: Jerson Emiliano Dos (Angola), Boris Martaise Ditsoga (Gabon); Fourth official: Tanguy Patrice Mebiame (Gabon)

===== Final =====
28 May 2023 First leg	Young Africans (Tanzania)	1–2	(Algeria) USM Alger	Dar es Salaam
16:00 UTC+3	Job (yellow card) 30'; Mayele 82'	Report	Mahious 32'; Chita (yellow card) 49'; Alilet (yellow card) 60'; Benzaza (yellow card) 80'; Merili 84'; Benbot (yellow card) 90'	Stadium: National Stadium; Referee: Jean Jacques Ndala Ngambo (DR Congo); Assistant referees: Zakhele Thusi Granville Siwela (South Africa), Olivier Safari Kabene (DR Congo); Fourth official: Ahmad Imtehaz Heeralall (Mauritius)

3 June 2023 Second leg	USM Alger (Algeria)	0–1 (2–2 agg.)	(Tanzania) Young Africans	Algiers
20:00 UTC+1	Mahious (yellow card) 5'; Belaïd (penalty missed) 58'; Orebonye (yellow card) 78'; Loucif (yellow card) 90+7'	Report	Shabani 7' (pen.); Lomalisa (yellow card) 15'; Mwamnyeto (yellow card) 67'; Yahya (yellow card) 74'; Morrison (yellow card) 90'	Stadium: Stade du 5 Juillet; Referee: Dahane Beida (Mauritania); Assistant referees: Jerson Emiliano dos Santos (Angola), Arsénio Chadreque Marengula (Mozambique); Fourth official: Mahmood Ismail (Sudan)

== Squad information ==
=== Appearances and goals ===
No.	Pos	Player	Nat	Ligue 1			Algerian Cup			Confederation Cup			Total		
No.	Pos	Player	Nat	App	St	G	App	St	G	App	St	G	App	St	G
Goalkeepers
1	GK	Lamine Zemmamouche	(Algeria)	0	0	0	1	1	−2	0	0	0	1	1	−2
16	GK	Imad Benchlef	(Algeria)	6	6	−11	0	0	0	0	0	0	6	6	−11
25	GK	Oussama Benbot	(Algeria)	24	24	−19	0	0	0	16	16	−11	40	40	−30
Defenders
3	RB	Abdelkader Belharrane	(Algeria)	10	6	0	1	0	0	0	0	0	11	6	0
4	CB	Zineddine Belaïd	(Algeria)	23	23	3	0	0	0	16	16	3	39	39	6
5	CB	Mustapha Bouchina	(Algeria)	15	9	0	1	0	0	8	1	0	24	10	0
12	RB	Haithem Loucif	(Algeria)	11	9	1	1	1	0	12	10	0	24	19	1
19	RB	Saâdi Radouani	(Algeria)	24	22	2	0	0	0	12	12	2	36	34	4
21	CB	Adam Alilet	(Algeria)	18	18	2	1	1	0	15	15	2	34	34	4
22	LB	Houari Baouche	(Algeria)	18	17	0	1	1	0	7	5	0	26	23	0
27	CB	Ibrahim Bekakchi	(Algeria)	9	6	0	1	1	0	0	0	0	10	7	0
37	DF	Mohamed Belhadj Kacem (Note: Player from USM Alger Reserve)	(Algeria)	2	2	0	0	0	0	0	0	0	2	2	0
44	DF	Wassim Ouahab	(Algeria)	2	2	0	0	0	0	0	0	0	2	2	0
81	CB	Abdessamed Bounacer	(Algeria)	2	2	0	0	0	0	4	1	0	6	3	0
82	DF	Aymen Kennan	(Algeria)	1	0	0	0	0	0	0	0	0	1	0	0
Midfielders
6	DM	Oussama Chita	(Algeria)	22	20	1	1	1	0	16	15	0	39	36	1
8	AM	Islam Merili	(Algeria)	19	15	2	1	1	0	12	5	2	32	21	4
14	DM	Brahim Benzaza	(Algeria)	16	11	1	1	1	0	11	9	0	28	21	1
15	DM	Messala Merbah	(Algeria)	8	7	1	0	0	0	4	1	0	12	8	1
24	DM	Taher Benkhelifa	(Algeria)	24	10	0	1	0	0	13	9	0	38	19	0
26	AM	Akram Djahnit	(Algeria)	24	16	0	0	0	0	10	6	0	34	22	0
31	MF	Mohamed Djenidi	(Algeria)	2	1	0	0	0	0	0	0	0	2	1	0
36	MF	Mostafa Bekane	(Algeria)	2	0	0	0	0	0	0	0	0	2	0	0
38	MF	Abdelkrim Namani	(Algeria)	2	2	0	0	0	0	0	0	0	2	2	0
72	AM	Mohamed Ait El Hadj	(Algeria)	20	11	1	1	1	0	6	0	0	27	12	1
Forwards
7	LW	Ismail Belkacemi	(Algeria)	18	10	2	1	1	0	14	5	1	33	16	3
10	LW	Abderrahmane Meziane	(Algeria)	22	20	3	0	0	0	11	8	3	33	28	6
11	RW	Abdelkrim Zouari	(Algeria)	17	10	1	0	0	0	7	6	0	24	16	1
13	ST	Tumisang Orebonye	(Botswana)	11	9	0	0	0	0	12	11	1	23	20	1
17	RW	Abdesslem Bouchouareb	(Algeria)	10	5	1	1	0	0	4	0	0	15	5	1
18	ST	Aymen Mahious	(Algeria)	17	14	6	1	1	1	15	15	4	33	30	11
20	RW	Zakaria Alharaish	(Libya)	11	8	1	0	0	0	4	2	0	15	10	1
23	LW	Khaled Bousseliou	(Algeria)	10	6	0	1	0	0	11	7	4	22	13	4
32	FW	Ismail Ghanemi	(Algeria)	2	0	0	0	0	0	0	0	0	2	0	0
35	ST	Khalil Darfalou	(Algeria)	0	0	0	0	0	0	0	0	0	0	0	0
42	FW	Toufik Belmadi	(Algeria)	2	0	0	0	0	0	0	0	0	2	0	0
71	ST	Abderraouf Othmani	(Algeria)	14	4	1	1	0	1	1	0	0	16	4	2
87	FW	Samy Bouali	(Algeria)	2	0	0	0	0	0	0	0	0	2	0	0
Players transferred out during the season
~~2~~	LB	Mehdi Beneddine	(Algeria)	0	0	0	0	0	0	0	0	0	0	0	0
~~9~~	ST	Abderrahmane Bacha	(Algeria)	12	3	1	0	0	0	4	0	0	16	3	1
~~13~~	LW	Hamed Belem	(Burkina Faso)	4	2	0	0	0	0	4	1	0	8	3	0
Total				30		31	1		2	16		24	47		57

Last updated: 15 July 2023
Source: soccerway.com

=== Disciplinary record ===
No.	Pos.	Player	Ligue 1			Algerian Cup			Confederation Cup			Total		
No.	Pos.	Player	Yellow card	(yellow card) (yellow-red card)	Red card	Yellow card	(yellow card) (yellow-red card)	Red card	Yellow card	(yellow card) (yellow-red card)	Red card	Yellow card	(yellow card) (yellow-red card)	Red card
25	GK	(Algeria) Oussama Benbot	3	0	0	0	0	0	2	0	0	5	0	0
3	DF	(Algeria) Abdelkader Belharrane	1	0	0	0	0	0	0	0	0	1	0	0
4	DF	(Algeria) Zineddine Belaïd	2	0	1	0	0	0	0	0	0	2	0	1
5	DF	(Algeria) Mustapha Bouchina	2	0	0	0	0	0	2	0	0	4	0	0
12	DF	(Algeria) Haithem Loucif	2	0	0	0	0	0	2	0	0	4	0	0
19	DF	(Algeria) Saâdi Radouani	3	0	0	0	0	0	0	0	0	3	0	0
21	DF	(Algeria) Adam Alilet	5	0	1	0	0	0	6	0	0	11	0	1
22	DF	(Algeria) Houari Baouche	4	0	0	0	0	0	0	0	0	4	0	0
27	DF	(Algeria) Ibrahim Bekakchi	1	0	0	0	0	0	0	0	0	1	0	0
81	DF	(Algeria) Abdessamed Bounacer	0	0	0	0	0	0	1	0	0	1	0	0
6	MF	(Algeria) Oussama Chita	2	0	0	0	0	0	2	0	0	4	0	0
8	MF	(Algeria) Islam Merili	4	0	0	0	0	0	1	0	0	5	0	0
14	MF	(Algeria) Brahim Benzaza	2	0	0	1	0	0	5	0	0	8	0	0
24	MF	(Algeria) Taher Benkhelifa	5	1	0	0	0	0	3	0	0	8	1	0
26	MF	(Algeria) Akram Djahnit	1	0	0	0	0	0	0	0	0	1	0	0
72	MF	(Algeria) Mohamed Ait El Hadj	1	0	0	0	0	0	1	0	0	2	0	0
7	FW	(Algeria) Ismail Belkacemi	1	0	0	0	0	0	2	0	0	3	0	0
10	FW	(Algeria) Abderrahmane Meziane	3	0	0	0	0	0	0	0	0	3	0	0
11	FW	(Algeria) Abdelkrim Zouari	2	0	0	0	0	0	1	0	0	3	0	0
13	FW	(Botswana) Tumisang Orebonye	1	0	0	0	0	0	2	0	0	3	0	0
17	FW	(Algeria) Abdesslem Bouchouareb	2	0	0	0	0	0	1	0	0	3	0	0
18	FW	(Algeria) Aymen Mahious	1	0	0	0	0	0	2	0	0	3	0	0
20	FW	(Libya) Zakaria Alharaish	1	0	0	0	0	0	1	0	0	2	0	0
23	FW	(Algeria) Khaled Bousseliou	0	0	0	0	0	0	3	0	0	3	0	0
71	FW	(Algeria) Abderraouf Othmani	2	0	0	0	0	0	0	0	0	2	0	0
Total			51	1	2	1	0	0	37	0	0	89	1	2

=== Goalscorers ===
Includes all competitive matches. The list is sorted alphabetically by surname when total goals are equal.

No.	Nat.	Player	Pos.	L 1	AC	C 3	TOTAL
18	(Algeria)	Aymen Mahious	FW	6	1	4	11
10	(Algeria)	Abderrahmane Meziane	FW	3	0	3	6
4	(Algeria)	Zineddine Belaïd	DF	3	0	3	6
21	(Algeria)	Adam Alilet	DF	2	0	2	4
19	(Algeria)	Saâdi Radouani	DF	2	0	2	4
23	(Algeria)	Khaled Bousseliou	FW	0	0	4	4
8	(Algeria)	Islam Merili	MF	2	0	2	4
7	(Algeria)	Ismail Belkacemi	FW	2	0	1	3
71	(Algeria)	Abderraouf Othmani	FW	1	1	0	2
15	(Algeria)	Messala Merbah	MF	1	0	0	1
9	(Algeria)	Abderrahmane Bacha	FW	1	0	0	1
11	(Algeria)	Abdelkrim Zouari	FW	1	0	0	1
6	(Algeria)	Oussama Chita	MF	1	0	0	1
17	(Algeria)	Abdesslem Bouchouareb	FW	1	0	0	1
72	(Algeria)	Mohamed Ait El Hadj	FW	1	0	0	1
13	(Botswana)	Tumisang Orebonye	FW	0	0	1	1
14	(Algeria)	Brahim Benzaza	MF	1	0	0	1
20	(Libya)	Zakaria Alharaish	FW	1	0	0	1
12	(Algeria)	Haithem Loucif	DF	1	0	0	1
Own Goals				1	0	2	3
Totals				31	2	24	57

=== Penalties ===
Date	Nation	Name	Opponent	Scored?
9 October 2022	(Algeria)	Aymen Mahious	ASC Kara	✓
7 December 2022	(Algeria)	Abderrahmane Meziane	CR Belouizdad	Penalty missed
24 December 2022	(Algeria)	Aymen Mahious	CS Constantine	✓
8 February 2023	(Algeria)	Ismail Belkacemi	RC Arbaâ	Penalty missed
8 February 2023	(Algeria)	Aymen Mahious	RC Arbaâ	✓
2 April 2023	(Algeria)	Zineddine Belaïd	Al Akhdar	✓
2 April 2023	(Algeria)	Adam Alilet	Al Akhdar	✓
3 June 2023	(Algeria)	Zineddine Belaïd	Young Africans	Penalty missed
1 July 2023	(Algeria)	Zineddine Belaïd	RC Arbaâ	✓

=== Clean sheets ===
As of 15 July 2023

Includes all competitive matches.

					Clean sheets			
No.	Nat	Name	GP	GA	L 1	AC	CC 3	Total
1	(Algeria)	Mohamed Lamine Zemmamouche	1	2	0	0	0	0
16	(Algeria)	Imad Benchlef	6	11	1	0	0	1
25	(Algeria)	Oussama Benbot	40	30	10	0	8	18
		TOTALS		43	11	0	8	19
