= 2018–19 AS Ain M'lila season =

AS Ain M'lila
2018–19 season
- Chairman: Elhedi Bensid
- Head coach: Lakhdar Adjali (from 22 June 2018) (until 14 September 2018); Darko Janacković (from 22 November 2018) (until 7 January 2019); Azzedine Aït Djoudi (from 21 February 2019)
- Stadium: 1 November 1954 Stadium, Batna (Note: AS Ain M'lila played their home matches at November 1, 1954 Stadium, Batna, instead of their regular stadium Stade des Frères Demane Debbih, Aïn M'lila until round 18 they moved to the new stadium Zoubir Khelifi Touhami Stadium, Aïn M'lila.); Touhami Zoubir Khelifi Stadium, Aïn M'lila
- Ligue 1: 12th
- Algerian Cup: Round of 32
- Top goalscorer: League: Mohamed Tiaiba (8); All: Mohamed Tiaiba (8)

In the 2018–19 season, AS Ain M'lila is competing in Ligue 1 for the 18th season, as well as for the Algerian Cup.

== Competitions ==
=== Overview ===
Competition	Record								Started round	Final position / round	First match	Last match
Competition	G	W	D	L	GF	GA	GD	Win %	Started round	Final position / round	First match	Last match
Ligue 1	30	7	15	8	20	30	−10	23.33	—N/a	12th	11 August 2018	26 May 2019
Algerian Cup	2	0	1	1	2	3	−1	0.00	Round of 64	Round of 32	17 December 2018	28 December 2018
Total	32	7	16	9	22	33	−11	21.88				

Updated to match played 28 May 2018
Source: Competitions

== League table ==
Pos	Team	Pld	W	D	L	GF	GA	GD	Pts	Qualification or relegation
10	MC Oran	30	8	12	10	33	38	−5	36 (Note: Head-to-head: MC Oran 7 points; NA Hussein Dey 5 points; AS Aïn M'lila 3 points.)	
11	NA Hussein Dey	30	9	9	12	22	29	−7	36	
12	AS Aïn M'lila	30	7	15	8	20	30	−10	36	
13	USM Bel Abbès	30	9	8	13	24	39	−15	35	
14	MO Béjaïa (R)	30	7	12	11	23	36	−13	33	Relegation to Ligue 2

Source: DZFoot
Rules for classification: 1) points; 2) head-to-head points; 3) head-to-head goal difference; 4) goal difference; 5) total goals; 6) fairplay ranking; 7) playoff.
(R) Relegated

=== Results summary ===
Overall								Home						Away					
Pld	W	D	L	GF	GA	GD	Pts	W	D	L	GF	GA	GD	W	D	L	GF	GA	GD
0	0	0	0	0	0	0	0	0	0	0	0	0	0	0	0	0	0	0	0

Last updated: 28 May 2018.
Source: Competitive matches

=== Results by round ===
Round	1	2	3	4	5	6	7	8	9	10	11	12	13	14	15	16	17	18	19	20	21	22	23	24	25	26	27	28	29	30
Ground	A	H	A	H	A	H	A	H	A	H	A	H	A	A	H	H	A	H	A	H	A	H	A	H	A	H	A	H	H	A
Result	W	W	D	D	L	D	L	D	L	D	D	W	D	L	D	D	L	D	D	D	D	D	D	W	L	W	L	W	W	L
Position	2	1	2	2	5	7	7	9	11	11	11	10	10	11	12	13	14	12	11	12	13	12	13	10	13	11	12	11	10	12

Updated to match(es) played on 16 May 2019. Source: Competitive matches
A = Away; H = Home; W = Win; D = Draw; L = Loss

=== Matches ===
Win Draw Loss

11 August 2018 Round 1	CR Belouizdad	0–3	AS Ain M'lila	Belouizdad
17:00		Soccerway report		Stadium: Stade 20 Août 1955; Referee: Mustapha Bessiri
Note: Penalty lost to the CR Belouizdad to award the win to the AS Ain M'lila who scores three (03) points and a score of 3/0.

25 August 2018 Round 2	AS Ain M'lila	1–0	ES Sétif	Batna
17:00	Benchaira 44'	Soccerway report		Stadium: 1 November 1954 Stadium; Attendance: 0 (close doors); Referee: Missoum Benabdellah

28 August 2018 Round 3	Olympique de Médéa	0–0	AS Ain M'lila	Médéa
17:00		Soccerway report		Stadium: Stade Imam Lyes de Médéa; Referee: Amine Sekhraoui

1 September 2018 Round 4	AS Ain M'lila	0–0	JS Kabylie	Batna
17:00		Soccerway report		Stadium: 1 November 1954 Stadium; Referee: Mustapha Ghorbal

10 September 2018 Round 5	MC Oran	3–1	AS Ain M'lila	Oran
19:00	Hammar 22'; Sebbah 43'; Chibane 89'	Soccerway report	Si Ammar 85'	Stadium: Ahmed Zabana Stadium; Referee: Merzoug Brahimi

14 September 2018 Round 6	AS Ain M'lila	0–0	CS Constantine	Batna
17:00		Soccerway report		Stadium: 1 November 1954 Stadium; Referee: Mohamed Saïdi

20 September 2018 Round 7	USM Alger	3–0	AS Ain M'lila	Bologhine
19:00	Benmoussa 12' (pen.); Benguit 41'; Mahious 45'	Soccerway report		Stadium: Omar Hamadi Stadium; Referee: Redouane Necib

28 September 2018 Round 8	AS Ain M'lila	1–1	NA Hussein Dey	Batna
16:00	Kangou 17'	Soccerway report	Gasmi 43'	Stadium: 1 November 1954 Stadium; Referee: Lahlou Benbraham

5 October 2018 Round 9	CA Bordj Bou Arreridj	2–0	AS Ain M'lila	Bordj Bou Arréridj
17:45	Diarra 87'; Mellel 89'	Soccerway report		Stadium: Stade 20 Août 1955; Referee: Ahmed Bouzrar

9 October 2018 Round 10	AS Ain M'lila	0–0	JS Saoura	Batna
15:00		Soccerway report		Stadium: 1 November 1954 Stadium; Referee: Amine Sekhraoui

20 October 2018 Round 11	MO Béjaïa	0–0	AS Ain M'lila	Béjaïa
17:45		Soccerway report		Stadium: Stade de l'Unité Maghrébine; Referee: Lyés Bekouassa

6 November 2018 Round 13	DRB Tadjenanet	0–0	AS Ain M'lila	Tadjenanet
17:00		Soccerway report		Stadium: Lahoua Smaïl Stadium; Referee: Redouane Necib

10 November 2018 Round 14	Paradou AC	3–0	AS Ain M'lila	Bologhine
18:00	Naidji 1'; Mouali 61'; Bouzok 90+2'	Soccerway report		Stadium: Omar Hamadi Stadium; Referee: Mustapha Bessiri

17 November 2018 Round 12	AS Ain M'lila	1–0	USM Bel Abbès	Batna
16:00	Benyahia 64'	Soccerway report		Stadium: 1 November 1954 Stadium; Referee: Ahmed Bouzrar

21 November 2018 Round 15	AS Ain M'lila	1–1	MC Alger	Batna
18:00	Benchaira 48'	Soccerway report	Souibaâh 45'	Stadium: 1 November 1954 Stadium; Referee: Farouk Mial

4 January 2019 Round 16	AS Ain M'lila	1–1	CR Belouizdad	Batna
15:00	Tiaïba 84'	Soccerway report	Bechou 31'	Stadium: 1 November 1954 Stadium; Referee: Abderrezzak Arab

19 January 2019 Round 18	AS Ain M'lila	0–0	Olympique de Médéa	Aïn M'lila
15:00		Soccerway report		Stadium: Zoubir Khelifi Touhami Stadium; Referee: Amine Sekhraoui

25 January 2019 Round 19	JS Kabylie	1–1	AS Ain M'lila	Tizi Ouzou
17:45	Bellaili 83'	Soccerway report	Mahious 81'	Stadium: November 1, 1954 Stadium; Attendance: 0 (close doors); Referee: Lyés Bekouassa

30 January 2019 Round 17	ES Sétif	4–0	AS Ain M'lila	Sétif
16:00	Djabou 17', 33', 84'; Bouguelmouna 81'	Soccerway report		Stadium: Stade 8 Mai 1945; Referee: Merzoug Brahimi

4 February 2019 Round 20	AS Ain M'lila	0–0	MC Oran	Aïn M'lila
15:00		Soccerway report		Stadium: Zoubir Khelifi Touhami Stadium; Referee: Ahmed Bouzrar

8 February 2019 Round 21	CS Constantine	0–0	AS Ain M'lila	Constantine
17:00		Soccerway report		Stadium: Stade Mohamed Hamlaoui; Referee: Lotfi Bekouassa

13 February 2019 Round 22	AS Ain M'lila	0–0	USM Alger	Aïn M'lila
15:00		Soccerway report		Stadium: Zoubir Khelifi Touhami Stadium; Referee: Farouk Mial

17 March 2019 Round 24	AS Ain M'lila	1–0	CA Bordj Bou Arreridj	Aïn M'lila
15:00	Si Ammar 5'	Soccerway report		Stadium: Zoubir Khelifi Touhami Stadium; Referee: Mustapha Bessiri

1 April 2019 Round 25	JS Saoura	4–1	AS Ain M'lila	Béchar
19:00	Talah 4'; Boubekeur 17'; Hammar 59'; Yahia-Chérif 78'	Soccerway report	Tiaiba 64'	Stadium: Stade 20 Août 1955; Referee: Said Aouina

15 April 2019 Round 23	NA Hussein Dey	1–1	AS Ain M'lila	Belouizdad
16:00	Gasmi 23' (pen.)	Soccerway report	Tiaiba 28'	Stadium: Stade 20 Août 1955; Referee: Mustapha Ghorbal

21 April 2019 Round 26	AS Ain M'lila	2–1	MO Béjaïa	Aïn M'lila
16:00	Tiaiba 76', 90+3'	Soccerway report	Bessan 62'	Stadium: Zoubir Khelifi Touhami Stadium; Attendance: 0 (close doors); Referee: Abderrezzak Arab

11 May 2019 Round 27	USM Bel Abbès	1–0	AS Ain M'lila	Sidi Bel Abbès
22:30	Seguer 90+6' (pen.)	Soccerway report		Stadium: Stade 24 Fevrier 1956; Referee: Merzoug Brahimi

16 May 2019 Round 28	AS Ain M'lila	2–0	DRB Tadjenanet	Aïn M'lila
16:00	Mahious 45+2' (pen.); Tiaïba 57'	Soccerway report		Stadium: Zoubir Khelifi Touhami Stadium; Attendance: 0 (close doors); Referee: Hamza Bouslimani

21 May 2019 Round 29	AS Ain M'lila	1–0	Paradou AC	Aïn M'lila
16:00	Tiaïba 45+1'	Soccerway report		Stadium: Zoubir Khelifi Touhami Stadium; Referee: Mohamed Saïdi

26 May 2019 Round 30	MC Alger	4–2	AS Ain M'lila	Algiers
22:30	Amada 18'; Souibaâh 53'; Frioui 88'; Nekkache 90+1'	Soccerway report	Tiaiba 63'; Mahious 75'	Stadium: July 5, 1962 Stadium; Referee: Lahlou Benbraham

== Algerian Cup ==
17 December 2018 Round of 64	MC El Bayadh	1–1 (a.e.t.) (1–4 p)	AS Ain M'lila	El Bayadh
14:00	Ghendouzi 75'		68' Ibrahim Si Ammar	Stadium: Zakaria El Madjdoub Stadium

28 December 2018 Round of 32	AS Ain M'lila	1–2 (a.e.t.)	JSM Béjaïa	Batna
15:00	Si Ammar 76'		Khazri 29'; Allali 97'	Stadium: 1 November 1954 Stadium

== Squad information ==
=== Playing statistics ===
No.	Pos	Nat	Player	Total		Ligue 1		Algerian Cup	
No.	Pos	Nat	Player	Apps	Goals	Apps	Goals	Apps	Goals
Goalkeepers
16	GK	(Algeria) ALG	Billel Boufeneche	14	0	14	0	0	0
30	GK	(Algeria) ALG	Tadjeddine Gharbi	1	0	1	0	0	0
1	GK	(Algeria) ALG	Omar Hadji	15	0	15	0	0	0
Defenders
12	DF	(Algeria) ALG	Zineddine Benyahia	16	1	16	1	0	0
4	DF	(Algeria) ALG	Abderrezak Bitam	27	0	27	0	0	0
22	DF	(Algeria) ALG	Abdelghani Bouzidi	12	0	12	0	0	0
17	DF	(Algeria) ALG	Djamel Eddine Ibouziden	25	0	25	0	0	0
19	DF	(Algeria) ALG	Mohamed Kaneche	26	0	26	0	0	0
23	DF	(Algeria) ALG	Hakim Khoudi	13	0	13	0	0	0
25	DF	(Algeria) ALG	Rabah Ziad	27	1	27	1	0	0
Midfielders
7	MF	(Algeria) ALG	Mohamed Amine Berkani	3	0	3	0	0	0
28	MF	(Algeria) ALG	Abdesslem Bouchouareb	4	0	4	0	0	0
10	MF	(Algeria) ALG	Lotfi Dif	19	0	19	0	0	0
11	MF	(Algeria) ALG	Ahmed Djellali	11	0	11	0	0	0
24	MF	(Algeria) ALG	Houd Ahmed Taha Djoghma	19	0	19	0	0	0
	MF	(Algeria) ALG	Salim Mekenza	1	0	1	0	0	0
20	MF	(Algeria) ALG	Abdeslem Rihane	23	0	23	0	0	0
5	MF	(Algeria) ALG	Ibrahim Si Ammar	26	2	26	2	0	0
29	MF	(Algeria) ALG	Cherif Siam	28	2	28	2	0	0
	MF	(Algeria) ALG	Faouzi Bourenane	9	0	9	0	0	0
	MF	(Burkina Faso) BFA	Ousmane Sylla	14	0	14	0	0	0
Forwards
	FW	(Ghana) GHA	Bernard Arthur	3	0	3	0	0	0
	FW	(Algeria) ALG	Walid Hanifi	3	0	3	0	0	0
	FW	(Algeria) ALG	Dhia Eddine Khouni	2	0	2	0	0	0
	FW	(Algeria) ALG	Aymen Mahious	13	2	13	2	0	0
13	FW	(Algeria) ALG	Mohamed Tiaiba	14	8	14	8	0	0
Players transferred out during the season
21	FW	(Republic of the Congo) CGO	Ronel Kangou	3	1	3	1	0	0
15	MF	(Algeria) ALG	Mokhtar Lamhene	2	0	2	0	0	0
	MF	(Algeria) ALG	Mohamed Benchaira	13	2	13	2	0	0

Last updated: 11 June 2018
Source: fr.soccerway.com

== Squad list ==
As of August 11, 2018: Note: Flags indicate national team as defined under FIFA eligibility rules; some limited exceptions apply. Players may hold more than one non-FIFA nationality.

No.	Pos.	Nation	Player
1	GK	ALG	Omar Hadji
4	DF	ALG	Abderrezak Bitam
5	MF	ALG	Ibrahim Si Ammar
6	DF	ALG	Mohamed Bachir Adraoui
7	FW	ALG	Mohamed Amine Berkani
8	MF	ALG	Mohamed Benchaira
9	FW	ALG	Ilyes Korbiaa
10	FW	ALG	Lotfi Dif
11	MF	ALG	Ahmed Djellali
12	DF	ALG	Zineddine Benyahia (captain)
13	FW	ALG	Mohamed Tiaiba
14	FW	ALG	Salih Sahbi
15	MF	ALG	Mokhtar Lamhene

No.	Pos.	Nation	Player
16	GK	ALG	Billel Boufeneche
17	DF	ALG	Djamel Eddine Ibouziden
18	FW	ALG	Chakib Berkani
19	DF	ALG	Mohamed Kaneche
20	MF	ALG	Abdeslem Rihane (vice-captain)
21	FW	CGO	Ronel Kangou
22	DF	ALG	Abdelghani Bouzidi
23	DF	ALG	Hakim Khoudi
24	MF	ALG	Houd Ahmed Taha Djoghma
25	DF	ALG	Rabah Ziad
28	MF	ALG	Abdesslem Bouchouareb
29	MF	ALG	Cherif Siam
30	GK	ALG	Tadjeddine Gharbi

== Transfers ==
=== In ===
Date	Pos	Player	From club	Transfer fee	Source
19 June 2018	MF	(Algeria) Mokhtar Amir Lamhene	CR Belouizdad	Free transfer	
19 June 2018	DF	(Algeria) Abderrezak Bitam	USM El Harrach	Free transfer	
29 June 2018	GK	(Algeria) Billel Boufeneche	DRB Tadjenanet	Free transfer	
5 July 2018	MF	(Algeria) Mohamed Benchaira	JSM Béjaïa	Free transfer	
9 July 2018	MF	(Algeria) Brahim Si Ammar	USM Blida	Free transfer	
9 July 2018	DF	(Algeria) Djamel Ibouzidène	ES Sétif	Free transfer	
18 July 2018	DF	(Algeria) Hakim Khoudi	CR Belouizdad	Free transfer	
18 July 2018	DF	(Algeria) Houd Ahmed Taha Djoghma	US Biskra	Free transfer	

=== Out ===
Date	Pos	Player	To club	Transfer fee	Source
2 June 2018	MF	(Algeria) Chouaib Debbih	ES Sétif	Free transfer	
10 June 2018	GK	(Algeria) Oussama Benbot	JS Kabylie	Free transfer	
