= Zakaria Alharaish =

Libyan footballer (born 1998)

Personal information
- Full name: Zakaria Mohamed Elmabruk Alharaish
- Date of birth: 23 October 1998 (age 28)
- Place of birth: Libya
- Position: Winger

Team information
- Current team: Asswehly SC
- Number: 9

Senior career*
Years	Team	Apps	(Gls)
2016–2021	Al Ahli Tripoli		
2018–2019	→ Sutjeska Nikšić (loan)	23	(3)
2019	→ IR Tanger (loan)	8	(0)
2020	→ CS Constantine (loan)	4	(1)
2022	Sutjeska Nikšić	14	(3)
2022–2023	USM Alger	11	(0)
2023–	Asswehly SC	0	(0)

International career^{‡}
2017–	Libya	10	(2)
- * Club domestic league appearances and goals as of 15 July 2023 ‡ National team caps and goals as of 22 January 2021

Zakaria Mohamed Elmabruk Alharaish (Arabic: زكرياء الهريش; born 23 October 1998) is a Libyan international footballer who plays as a winger for Libyan Premier League club Asswehly SC and the Libyan national team.

== Club career ==
Alharaish started his professional career with Al Ahli from Tripoli. In July 2018, he joined Montenegrin club Sutjeska Nikšić on a year-long loan, with an option for an extension. On October 3, 2018, he scored his first goal for Sutjeska in a 3–0 win against Iskra Danilovgrad in the 2018–19 Montenegrin Cup. In 2022, he joined USM Alger.

== International career ==
Alharaish made his international debut for Libya at the 2017 CECAFA Cup. He was selected to Libya's squad for the 2018 African Nations Championship. He scored during his team's first game in the competition in a 3–0 win against Equatorial Guinea on January 15, 2018. He was recalled to the squad for the 2020 African Nations Championship.

== Honours ==
USM Alger

- CAF Confederation Cup: 2022–23
