= Yassin Cheikh El Welly =

Mauritanian footballer (born 1998)

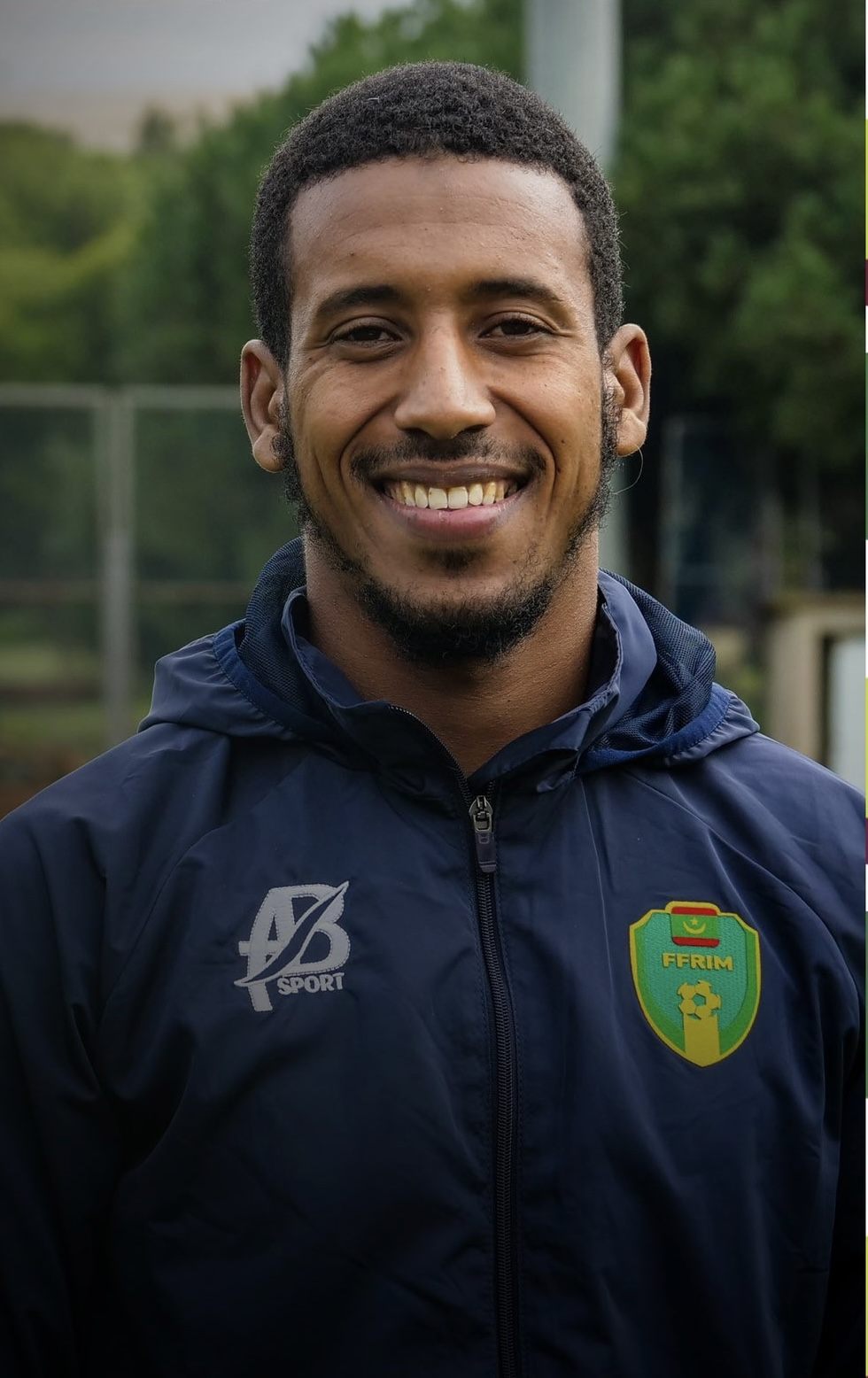

Personal information
- Date of birth: 10 October 1998 (age 28)
- Place of birth: Sahrawi refugee camps, Tindouf, Algeria
- Height: 1.75 m (5 ft 9 in)
- Position: Forward

Team information
- Current team: Nouadhibou

Senior career*
| Years | Team | Apps | (Gls) |
| 2017–2020 | Nouadhibou | | |
| 2020–2021 | Dhofar Club | | |
| 2021 | Khaleej Sirte | | |
| 2021–2022 | Tataouine | 6 | (1) |
| 2022–2023 | Nouadhibou | | |
| 2023–2025 | US Monastir | | |
| 2025 | NC Magra | 15 | (0) |
| 2025– | Nouadhibou | 0 | (0) |

International career^{‡}
| 2019– | Mauritania | 6 | (0) |
- * Club domestic league appearances and goals as of 21 June 2025 ‡ National team caps and goals as of 23:19, 27 March 2024 (UTC)

Yassin Cheikh El Welly (Arabic: ياسين شيخ الولي; born 10 October 1998) is a Mauritanian professional footballer who plays as a forward for Nouadhibou and the Mauritania national team.

== International career ==
On 26 December 2023, after not having been selected to the Mauritania squad for the 2023 Africa Cup of Nations, El Welly announced his retirement from international football. However, he backtracked on this on 7 January 2024 after he was called up to replace the injured Abdallahi Mahmoud.

== Honours ==
Nouadhibou

- Super D1: 2017–18, 2018–19, 2019–20, 2022–23
- Mauritanian President's Cup: 2018
