= Aymen Mahious =

Algerian footballer (born 1997)

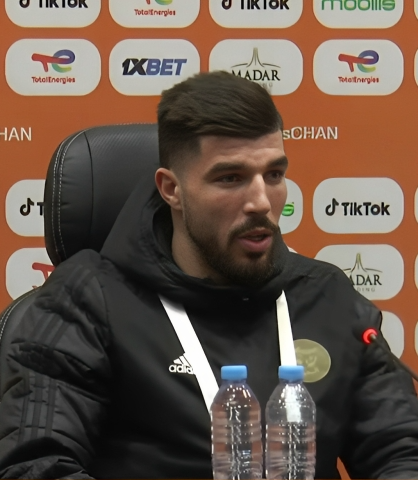
- Mahious in 2023

Personal information
- Date of birth: 15 September 1997 (age 29)
- Place of birth: Taher, Algeria
- Height: 1.85 m (6 ft 1 in)
- Position: Striker

Team information
- Current team: JS Kabylie
- Number: 18

Youth career
- MC Taher
- –2016: CS Constantine

Senior career*
Years	Team	Apps	(Gls)
2016–2017	JS Djijel		
2017–2018	CA Batna	26	(10)
2018–2023	USM Alger	81	(22)
2018–2019	→ AS Aïn M'lila (loan)	14	(3)
2023–2025	Yverdon-Sport	27	(7)
2024–2025	→ CR Belouizdad (loan)	22	(14)
2025–	JS Kabylie	35	(16)

International career^{‡}
2018	Algeria U23	5	(2)
2019–2025	Algeria A'	24	(9)
2023–	Algeria	2	(0)
Medal record
Men's football
Representing Algeria
African Nations Championship
Silver medal – second place	2022 Algeria	Team
- * Club domestic league appearances and goals as of 21:13, 19 November 2026 (UTC) ‡ National team caps and goals as of 16:05, 17 November 2025 (UTC)

Aymen Mahious (Arabic: أَيمَن مَحيُوص; Tamazight: ⴰⵢⵎⴻⵏ ⵎⴰⵀⵉⵓⵙ; born 15 September 1997) is an Algerian professional footballer who plays as a striker for JS Kabylie and the Algeria national team.

== Club career ==
=== USM Alger ===
On May 31, Mahious joined USM Alger for three seasons, coming from CA Batna for 3,000,000 DA. He made his debut for the team in the CAF Confederation Cup during a win against Rayon Sports, later in the Arab Club Champions Cup Mahious scored the winning goal against Al-Quwa Al-Jawiya his first goal with the club. On August 14, He made his debut in the Ligue 1 against DRB Tadjenanet as a substitute and made an assist for Zakaria Benchaâ in 3–1 victory. On September 21, and in the first game as a starter Mahious managed to score his first goal in the Ligue 1 against AS Ain M'lila in 3–0 victory. On July 1, Mahious returned to USM Alger after 6 months on loan to AS Ain M'lila, due to the financial crisis Mahious became an important player in the team On 25 August 2019, scoring his first goal in CAF Champions League against AS Sonidep in a 3–1 home win. Then he led USM Alger to victory against Gor Mahia outside the home by scoring a double.

Today, I bid farewell to my first home USM Alger, after 5 years I spent in this ancient team, this team that gave me everything, thanks to God, and thanks to our dear team, I joined the U-23 and Algeria A' teams and the Algeria national football team. Love and appreciation especially in the difficult times that I lived through after my injury after the final of the CHAN and in the death of my mother, thanks to the players with whom I spent unforgettable days.

— A message of thanks and farewell from Aymen Mahious on Instagram.

On 5 January 2020, in the Algerian Cup Mahious scored his first hat-trick in his career and made an assist for Billel Benhammouda against USM Khenchela in 6–1 victory. Before the start of the 2020–21 season, Mahious received an official offer from Mamelodi Sundowns, but the sports director Antar Yahya refused to release the player to any team. Aymen Mahious the demand has become high from several clubs, including Umm Salal of Qatar and Zamalek of Egypt, especially since his contract expires at the end of the season. On June 3, 2023, Mahious won the first title in his football career by winning the 2022–23 CAF Confederation Cup after defeating Young Africans of Tanzania.

=== Yverdon-Sport ===
On August 9, 2023, Aymen Mahious joined the newly promoted club in the Swiss Super League Yverdon-Sport for three seasons. On 11 August 2024, Mahious joined Algerian club CR Belouizdad on loan for the season.

=== JS Kabylie ===
On 26 July 2025, Mahious signed a three-year contract with JS Kabylie.

== International career ==
On 26 March 2019, Mahious scored his first goals with Algeria under-23 national team at the 2019 Africa U-23 Cup of Nations qualification against Equatorial Guinea in 3–1 victory. But Algeria failed to qualify for the finals after the elimination against Ghana. in 2019 Mahious calls for the first time for the Algeria A' national team in the 2020 CHAN qualification against Morocco. and participated as a substitute in the place of Lamine Abid. On January 2, 2023, Mahious was selected for the 28-man squad to participate in the 2022 African Nations Championship. Mahious became the first player to score in Nelson Mandela Stadium in the opening of the CHAN 2022 against Libya A'.

In the final Mahious missed a decisive penalty shootout which was the reason for losing the title, Mahious was criticized for the way he takes penalties, and he apologized to the Algerian people but he said that he would continue to take penalty kicks in that way. Mahious won the Golden Boot Award at the end of the tournament and was included in the squad for Best XI. May 30, 2023 the FAF publish the list of Djamel Belmadi for the two matches of the month of June, Where is called Mahious for the first time and his first match was against Uganda in the Africa Cup of Nations qualification.

== Career statistics ==
=== Club ===
As of 19 November 2026

Club	Season	League			Cup		Continental		Other		Total	
Club	Season	Division	Apps	Goals	Apps	Goals	Apps	Goals	Apps	Goals	Apps	Goals
CA Batna	2017–18	Ligue 2	26	11	—		—		—		26	11
USM Alger	2018–19	Ligue 1	9	1	—		4 (Note: All appearance(s) in CAF Confederation Cup)	0	3 (Note: All appearance(s) in Arab Club Champions Cup)	1	16	2
USM Alger	2019–20	Ligue 1	20	4	2	3	10 (Note: All appearance(s) in CAF Champions League)	5	—		32	12
USM Alger	2020–21	Ligue 1	11	3	—		—		1 (Note: All appearances in Algerian Super Cup)	1	12	4
USM Alger	2021–22	Ligue 1	24	8	—		—		—		24	8
USM Alger	2022–23	Ligue 1	16	6	1	1	14	4	—		31	11
Total			106	33	3	4	28	9	4	2	141	48
→ AS Aïn M'lila (loan)	2018–19	Ligue 1	14	3	—		—		—		14	3
Yverdon Sport	2023–24	Swiss Super League	25	7	2	3	—		—		27	10
Yverdon Sport	2024–25	Swiss Super League	2	0	0	0	—		—		2	0
Yverdon Sport	Total		41	10	2	3	—		—		43	13
→ CR Belouizdad (loan)	2024–25	Ligue 1	22	14	6	4	7	4	1	2	36	24
JS Kabylie	2025–26	Ligue 1	27	14	2	1	9	0	—		38	15
JS Kabylie	2026–27	Ligue 1	8	2	0	0	—		—		8	2
Career total			204	73	13	12	44	13	5	4	266	102

=== International goals ===
With Algeria U23

Goal	Date	Venue	Opponent	Score	Result	Competition
1.	26 March 2019	Stade du 5 Juillet, Algiers, Algeria	Equatorial Guinea U23	3–0	3–1	2019 Africa U-23 Cup of Nations qualification

With Algeria A'

Goal	Date	Venue	Opponent	Score	Result	Competition
1.	23 September 2022	Mohamed Hamlaoui Stadium, Constantine, Algeria	Nigeria	2–2	2–2	Friendly
2.	29 September 2022	Miloud Hadefi Stadium, Oran, Algeria	Sudan	2–0	2–0	Friendly
3.	29 octobre 2022	La Cigale sports Tabarka, Tabarka, Tunisia	Mali	2–0	4–0	Friendly
4.	17 December 2022	19 May 1956 Stadium, Annaba, Algeria	Senegal	2–2	2–2	Friendly
5.	13 January 2023	Nelson Mandela Stadium, Algiers, Algeria	Libya	1–0	1–0	2022 African Nations Championship
6.	17 January 2023	Nelson Mandela Stadium, Algiers, Algeria	Ethiopia	1–0	1–0	2022 African Nations Championship
7.	27 January 2023	Nelson Mandela Stadium, Algiers, Algeria	Ivory Coast	1–0	1–0	2022 African Nations Championship
8.	31 January 2023	Miloud Hadefi Stadium, Oran, Algeria	Niger	2–0	5–0	2022 African Nations Championship
9.	31 January 2023	Miloud Hadefi Stadium, Oran, Algeria	Niger	3–0	5–0	2022 African Nations Championship

== Honours ==
Algeria A'

- African Nations Championship runner-up: 2022

USM Alger

- CAF Confederation Cup: 2022–23

Individual

- African Nations Championship Best XI: 2022
- African Nations Championship Golden Boot Award: 2022
- Algerian Ligue Professionnelle 1 Top Scorer: 2025–26 (14 goals)
- JS Kabylie Top Scorer: 2025–26 (15 goals)
