= Bongani Mpandle =

South African soccer player

Personal information
- Date of birth: 12 July 1992 (age 34)
- Height: 1.84 m (6 ft 0 in)
- Position: Goalkeeper

Team information
- Current team: Magesi
- Number: 31

Senior career*
Years	Team	Apps	(Gls)
2012–2013	United	12	(0)
2013–2016	Bloemfontein Celtic	3	(0)
2016–2021	Maritzburg United	18	(0)
2021–2024	Cape Town City	1	(0)
2024–	Magesi	2	(0)

International career
2019	South Africa	1	(0)
- * Club domestic league appearances and goals as of 17 November 2024

Bongani Mpandle (born 12 July 1992) is a South African soccer player who plays as a goalkeeper for Magesi.

He was a squad member for South Africa's youth international team, among others at the 2011 COSAFA U-20 Cup. Having played for United F.C. in 2012–13, he then joined Bloemfontein Celtic and made his first-tier debut in the 2014–15 South African Premier Division. In 2016 he moved on to Maritzburg United. It was presumed that Mpandle would be a backup at Maritzburg United.

In 2019 Mpandle was called up to Bafana Bafana, who fielded a younger team than usual in the 2020 African Nations Championship qualification against Lesotho. Mpandle conceded three goals as Lesotho won 3–2.

In the summer of 2021 Mpandle moved on to Cape Town City. Here, it was understood that Mpandle would serve as a backup, or "understudy", to Darren Keet. With the deal originally lasting one year, he was quickly brought back after another goalkeeper Hugo Marques left Cape Town City. In the single league game where Keet was benched and Mpandle was given the opportunity for Cape Town City, Mpandle conceded three goals. He left Cape Town City in the summer of 2024, but stayed in the Premier Division, now with Magesi.
