= Ibrahim Bekakchi =

Algerian footballer (born 1992)

Personal information
- Full name: Ibrahim El Khalil Bekakchi
- Date of birth: January 10, 1992 (age 34)
- Place of birth: Sétif, Algeria
- Position: Defender

Team information
- Current team: US Biskra
- Number: 22

Youth career
- 2007–2009: AC FAF
- 2009–2010: ES Sétif

Senior career*
Years	Team	Apps	(Gls)
2011–2014	USM Alger	8	(0)
2014–2016	→ CA Bordj Bou Arréridj (loan)	55	(2)
2016–2019	JS Saoura	72	(4)
2019–2021	ES Sétif	54	(2)
2021–2023	USM Alger	27	(0)
2023–2024	US Souf	0	(0)
2024–2025	NC Magra	41	(0)
2025–2026	ES Sétif	13	(0)
2026–	US Biskra	0	(0)

International career
2008–2009	Algeria U17	13	(1)
2011	Algeria U20	1	(0)
- * Club domestic league appearances and goals as of 10 August 2026

Ibrahim El Khalil Bekakchi (Arabic: إبراهيم الخليل بكاكشي; born January 10, 1992) is an Algerian footballer who currently plays as a Defender for US Biskra in the Algerian Ligue Professionnelle 1.

== Club career ==
In July 2014, Bekakchi was loaned out to CA Bordj Bou Arréridj for two years.

In 2016, Ibrahim Bekakchi signed a contract with JS Saoura.

In 2019, Ibrahim Bekakchi signed a two-year contract with ES Sétif.

In 2021, Ibrahim Bekakchi signed a two-year contract with USM Alger.

On 10 August 2026, he joined US Biskra.

== International ==
In 2009, Bekakchi was selected as a member of the Algeria under-17 team at the 2009 FIFA U-17 World Cup in Nigeria.

== Honours ==
USM Alger

- CAF Confederation Cup: 2022–23
