= Imad Benchlef =

Algerian footballer (born 1993)

Personal information
- Date of birth: 12 October 1993 (age 33)
- Place of birth: Hassi Bahbah, Algeria
- Position: Goalkeeper

Team information
- Current team: US Biskra
- Number: 1

Youth career
- –2014: USM Alger

Senior career*
Years	Team	Apps	(Gls)
2014–2015	JS El Biar		
2015–2019	US Draa Ben Khedda		
2019–2022	NA Hussein Dey	65	(0)
2022–2023	USM Alger	6	(0)
2023–2024	ES Sétif	3	(0)
2024–2025	NC Magra	18	(0)
2025–	US Biskra	14	(0)
- * Club domestic league appearances and goals as of 6 June 2026

Imad Benchlef (Arabic: عماد بن شلف; born 12 October 1993) is an Algerian professional footballer who plays as a goalkeeper for US Biskra.

== Career ==
In 2018, Benchlef signed a contract with NA Hussein Dey.In 2022, he signed a contract with USM Alger.In August 2023, he joined ES Sétif. In 2024, he signed for NC Magra. In August 2025, he joined US Biskra.

== Honours ==
USM Alger

- CAF Confederation Cup: 2022–23
