= Abdesslem Bouchouareb =

Algerian footballer (born 1997)

Personal information
- Date of birth: 10 December 1997 (age 28)
- Place of birth: Thenia, Algeria
- Height: 1.83 m (6 ft 0 in)
- Position: Winger

Team information
- Current team: CA Batna
- Number: 26

Youth career
- –2017: AS Aïn M'lila

Senior career*
Years	Team	Apps	(Gls)
2017–2019	AS Aïn M'lila	10	(0)
2019–2020	AS Khroub	15	(8)
2020–2022	NC Magra	56	(4)
2022–2024	USM Alger	10	(1)
2024	ES Sétif	6	(0)
2024–2026	NC Magra		
2026–	CA Batna	0	(0)
- * Club domestic league appearances and goals as of 19 July 2024

Abdesslem Bouchouareb (Arabic: عبد السلام بوشوارب; born 10 December 1997) is an Algerian professional footballer who plays for CA Batna.

== Career ==
In 2022, Bouchouareb signed a two-year contract with USM Alger. On 4 February 2024, he joined ES Sétif.

== Honours ==
USM Alger

- CAF Confederation Cup: 2022–23
