= 2020–21 Karela United FC season =

Karela United FC
- Manager: Evans Adotey
- Stadium: Crosby Awuah Memorial (CAM) Park
- Premier League: 8th
- Top goalscorer: Diawisie Taylor (12)
Home colours	Away colours
- All statistics correct as of 11 April 2021.

2021–21 season of Ghanaian club Karela United FC

== Pre-season and friendlies ==
The season was delayed as a result of COVID-19 pandemic.

== Squad ==
=== Roaster beginning of season ===
As of 1 January 2021

Note: Flags indicate national team as defined under FIFA eligibility rules; some limited exceptions apply. Players may hold more than one non-FIFA nationality.

No.	Pos.	Nation	Player
1	GK	GHA	Peter Onyame
2	DF	GHA	Augustine Randolph
3	FW	GHA	Blessing Brafo
4	DF	GHA	Nurudeen Abdulai
5	MF	GHA	Sadiq Alhassan (vice-captain)
6	DF	GHA	Yaw Acheampong
7	FW	GHA	Darlington Gyanfosu
8	MF	GHA	Umar Bashiru
9	FW	GHA	Richard Berko
10	FW	GHA	Diawisie Taylor (vice-captain)
11	FW	GHA	Samuel Ofori
12	GK	GHA	Richard Baidoo
13	DF	GHA	Shaibu Iddrisu
14	FW	GHA	Kwame Boateng
15	DF	GHA	Godfred Agyemang Yeboah (captain)

No.	Pos.	Nation	Player
16	MF	GHA	Abraham Frimpong
17	FW	GHA	Godfrey Adotey
18	DF	GHA	Kwodwo Addae
19	MF	GHA	Joseph Cudjoe
20	DF	GHA	Mamudu Kamaradin
21	FW	GHA	Bennett Ofori
22	DF	GHA	Prosper Avor
23	FW	GHA	Solomon Opoku
24	MF	GHA	Ransford Takyi Amoah
28	MF	GHA	Evans Sarfo
29	MF	GHA	Franklin Osei
31	GK	GHA	Yaw Ansah Fufuro
33	FW	GHA	Obed Kofi Sam
34	DF	GHA	Mohammed Abubakar
35	DF	GHA	Kweku Osei

== League ==
- 2020–21 Ghana Premier League

=== Matches ===
Date	Opponents	H / A	Result F–A
15 November 2020	Ashanti Gold	A	2–2
22 November 2020	International Allies	H	1–0
29 November 2020	Dreams FC	H	2–1
4 December 2020	Accra Hearts of Oak	A	0–0
13 December 2020	King Faisal Babes	H	2–0
18 December 2020	Bechem United	A	2–1
3 January 2021	Elimina Sharks	H	3–1
10 January 2021	Eleven Wonders	A	3–1
17 January 2021	Berekum Chelsea FC	H	4–1
23 January 2021	Accra Great Olympics	A	0–0
31 January 2021	Medeama SC	H	2–0
4 February 2021	Legon Cities	A	0–0
7 February 2021	Asante Kotoko	H	0–2
14 February 2021	Ebusua Dwarfs	A	1–2
21 February 2021	Liberty Professionals	H	2–0
24 February 2021	West African Football Academy	A	3–1
6 March 2021	Aduana Stars	H	2–1
4 April 2021	Ashanti Gold	H	1–1
11 April 2021	International Allies	A	2–0
18 April 2021	Dreams FC	A	

== Squad statistics ==
=== Goalscorers ===
Includes all competitive matches. The list is sorted alphabetically by surname when total goals are equal.

Rank	No.	Pos.	Player	Premier League	FA Cup	Total
1	7	FW	(Ghana) Diawisie Taylor	12	0	12
2	10	MF	(Ghana) Kwame Boateng	7	0	7
3	11	MF	(Ghana) Umar Bashiru	3	0	3
4	20	DF	(Ghana) Richard Berko	1	0	1
5	26	MF	(Ghana) Samuel Ofori	1	0	1
Own goals						
Totals				24	0	24

=== Clean sheets ===
The list is sorted by shirt number when total clean sheets are equal. Numbers in parentheses represent games where both goalkeepers participated and both kept a clean sheet; the number in parentheses is awarded to the goalkeeper who was substituted on, whilst a full clean sheet is awarded to the goalkeeper who was on the field at the start of play.

			Clean sheets		
No.	Player	Games Played	Premier League	FA Cup	Total
12	(Ghana) Richard Baidoo	13	6	0	6
31	(Ghana) Yaw Ansah Fufuro	8	2	0	2
36	(Ghana) Lawrence Osei	1	0	0	0
Totals			8	0	8

== Awards ==
=== Ghana Premier League Player of the Month ===
Month	Player	Ref.
January	(Ghana) Diawisie Taylor	

=== Ghana Premier League Manager of the Month ===
Month	Player	Ref.
January	(Ghana) Evans Adotey	

== Managers ==
- Evans Adotey
