= 2022–23 CAF Champions League qualifying rounds =

- Dates: 10 September – 20 October 2022

Tournament statistics
- Matches played: 81
- Goals scored: 186 (2.3 per match)

The 2022–23 CAF Champions League qualifying rounds began on 10 September 2022 and ended on 20 October 2022. A total of 58 teams competed in the qualifying rounds to decide the 16 places in the group stage of the 2022–23 CAF Champions League.

Times were local.

== Draw ==
The draw for the qualifying rounds was held on 9 August 2022 at the CAF headquarters in Cairo, Egypt.

The entry round of the 58 teams entered into the draw was determined by their performances in the CAF competitions for the previous five seasons (CAF 5-year ranking points shown in parentheses).

| Entry round | Second round (6 teams) | First round (52 teams) |
|---|---|---|
| Teams | (Egypt) Al Ahly (78 pts); (Morocco) Wydad AC (71 pts); (Tunisia) Espérance de Tunis (58 pts); (Morocco) Raja CA (54 pts); (South Africa) Mamelodi Sundowns (46 pts); (Democratic Republic of the Congo) TP Mazembe (43 pts) | (Egypt) Zamalek (43 pts); (Angola) Petro de Luanda (31 pts); (Guinea) Horoya (31 pts); (Tanzania) Simba (28 pts); (Algeria) CR Belouizdad (27 pts); (Algeria) JS Kabylie (22 pts); (Sudan) Al Hilal (19.5 pts); (Democratic Republic of the Congo) AS Vita Club (17 pts); (Libya) Al Ahli Tripoli (15 pts); (Cameroon) Coton Sport (14.5 pts); (Angola) 1º de Agosto (10 pts); (Libya) Al Ittihad (10 pts); (Sudan) Al Merrikh (9 pts); (Ivory Coast) ASEC Mimosas (8 pts); (Republic of the Congo) AS Otohô (6 pts); (Mali) Djoliba (3.5 pts); (Eswatini) Royal Leopards (2.5 pts); (Ghana) Asante Kotoko (2 pts); (Mauritania) FC Nouadhibou (1.5 pts); (Tanzania) Young Africans (0.5 pts); Coton Sport Benin; (Botswana) Gaborone United; (Burkina Faso) Rail Club du Kadiogo; (Burundi) Flambeau du Centre; (Central African Republic) Olympic Real de Bangui; (Chad) Elect Sport; (Comoros) Volcan Club; (Djibouti) Arta Solar; (Equatorial Guinea) Deportivo Mongomo; (Ethiopia) Saint George; (Gabon) AS Stade Mandji; (The Gambia) Hawks; (Guinea) SOA Renaissante; (Lesotho) Matlama; (Liberia) Watanga; (Madagascar) CFFA; (Malawi) Nyasa Big Bullets; (Mozambique) Black Bulls; (Niger) ASN Nigelec; (Nigeria) Plateau United; (Nigeria) Rivers United; (Rwanda) APR; (Senegal) Casa Sports; (Seychelles) La Passe; (Sierra Leone) Bo Rangers; (South Africa) Cape Town City; (South Sudan) Zalan; (Togo) ASKO Kara; (Tunisia) Union Monastirienne; (Uganda) Vipers; (Zambia) Red Arrows; (Zanzibar) KMKM |

== Format ==
In the qualifying rounds, each tie was played on a home-and-away two-legged basis. If the aggregate score was tied after the second leg, the away goals rule was applied, and if still tied, extra time was not played, and the penalty shoot-out was used to determine the winner (Regulations III. 13 & 14).

== Schedule ==
The schedule of the competition was as follows.

Schedule for the 2022–23 CAF Champions League
| Round | Draw date | First leg | Second leg |
|---|---|---|---|
| First round | 9 August 2022 | 9–11 September 2022 | 16–18 September 2022 |
| Second round | 9 August 2022 | 7–9 October 2022 | 14–16 October 2022 |

== Bracket ==
The bracket of the draw was announced by the CAF on 9 August 2022. The 16 winners of the second round advanced to the group stage, while the 16 losers of the second round entered the CAF Confederation Cup playoff round.

| First round | | | | | Second round |
| 1 | (Nigeria) Rivers United | 3 | 0 | 3 |
| 4 | (Liberia) Watanga | 0 | 1 | 1 |
| 4 | (Liberia) Watanga | 0 | 1 | 1 | (Nigeria) Rivers United | 2 | 0 | 2 |
| | | | | | (Morocco) Wydad AC | 1 | 6 | 7 |

| First round | | | | | Second round |
| 1 | (Gabon) AS Stade Mandji | 2 | 0 | 2 |
| 4 | (Nigeria) Plateau United | 2 | 1 | 3 |
| 4 | (Nigeria) Plateau United | 2 | 1 | 3 | (Nigeria) Plateau United | 2 | 0 | 2 |
| | | | | | (Tunisia) Espérance de Tunis (a) | 1 | 1 | 2 |

| First round | | | | | Second round |
| 1 | (Niger) ASN Nigelec | 2 | 0 | 2 |
| 4 | (Guinea) SOA Renaissante | 1 | 0 | 1 |
| 4 | (Guinea) SOA Renaissante | 1 | 0 | 1 | (Niger) ASN Nigelec | 0 | 0 | 0 |
| | | | | | (Morocco) Raja CA | 2 | 1 | 3 |

| First round | | | | | Second round |
| 1 | (Rwanda) APR | 1 | 0 | 1 |
| 4 | (Tunisia) Union Monastirienne | 0 | 3 | 3 |
| 4 | (Tunisia) Union Monastirienne | 0 | 3 | 3 | (Tunisia) Union Monastirienne | 0 | 0 | 0 |
| | | | | | (Egypt) Al Ahly | 1 | 3 | 4 |

| First round | | | | | Second round |
| 1 | (Central African Republic) Olympic Real de Bangui | 0 | 0 | 0 |
| 4 | (Uganda) Vipers | 3 | 1 | 4 |
| 4 | (Uganda) Vipers | 3 | 1 | 4 | (Uganda) Vipers (p) | 0 | 0 | 0 (4) |
| | | | | | (Democratic Republic of the Congo) TP Mazembe | 0 | 0 | 0 (2) |

| First round | | | | | Second round |
| 1 | (Comoros) Volcan Club | 1 | — | — |
| 4 | (Seychelles) La Passe | 0 | — | w/o |
| 4 | (Seychelles) La Passe | 0 | — | w/o | (Seychelles) La Passe | 0 | 1 | 1 |
| | | | | | (South Africa) Mamelodi Sundowns | 7 | 8 | 15 |

First round
1 | Coton Sport Benin | 1 | 0 | 1
4 | (Ivory Coast) ASEC Mimosas | 2 | 2 | 4
3 | (The Gambia) Hawks | — | —
2 | (Guinea) Horoya | — | — | w/o

Second round
(Ivory Coast) ASEC Mimosas | 0 | 1 | 1
(Guinea) Horoya | 1 | 1 | 2

First round
1 | (Togo) ASKO Kara | 1 | 1 | 2
4 | (Mauritania) FC Nouadhibou | 1 | 0 | 1
3 | (Senegal) Casa Sports | 1 | 0 | 1
2 | (Algeria) JS Kabylie | 0 | 3 | 3

Second round
(Togo) ASKO Kara | 1 | 1 | 2
(Algeria) JS Kabylie | 2 | 1 | 3

First round
1 | (Equatorial Guinea) Deportivo Mongomo | 2 | 0 | 2
4 | (Mali) Djoliba | 0 | 5 | 5
3 | (Sierra Leone) Bo Rangers | 0 | 0 | 0
2 | (Algeria) CR Belouizdad | 0 | 3 | 3

Second round
(Mali) Djoliba | 2 | 0 | 2
(Algeria) CR Belouizdad | 1 | 2 | 3

First round
1 | (South Sudan) Zalan | 0 | 0 | 0
4 | (Tanzania) Young Africans | 4 | 5 | 9
3 | (Ethiopia) Saint George | 2 | 0 | 2
2 | (Sudan) Al Hilal (a) | 1 | 1 | 2

Second round
(Tanzania) Young Africans | 1 | 0 | 1
(Sudan) Al Hilal | 1 | 1 | 2

First round
1 | (Djibouti) Arta Solar | 1 | 0 | 1
4 | (Sudan) Al Merrikh | 2 | 0 | 2
3 | (Zanzibar) KMKM | 0 | 0 | 0
2 | (Libya) Al Ahli Tripoli | 2 | 4 | 6

Second round
(Sudan) Al Merrikh (a) | 2 | 1 | 3
(Libya) Al Ahli Tripoli | 0 | 3 | 3

First round
1 | (Burundi) Flambeau du Centre (a) | 1 | 1 | 2
4 | (Libya) Al Ittihad | 0 | 2 | 2
3 | (Chad) Elect Sport | 0 | 0 | 0
2 | (Egypt) Zamalek | 2 | 2 | 4

Second round
(Burundi) Flambeau du Centre | 0 | 1 | 1
(Egypt) Zamalek | 1 | 5 | 6

First round
1 | (South Africa) Cape Town City | 2 | 0 | 2
4 | (Republic of the Congo) AS Otohô | 0 | 0 | 0
3 | (Mozambique) Black Bulls | 0 | 1 | 1
2 | (Angola) Petro de Luanda | 3 | 2 | 5

Second round
(South Africa) Cape Town City | 0 | 0 | 0
(Angola) Petro de Luanda | 3 | 1 | 4

First round
1 | (Zambia) Red Arrows | 0 | 1 | 1
4 | (Angola) 1º de Agosto | 1 | 1 | 2
3 | (Malawi) Nyasa Big Bullets | 0 | 0 | 0
2 | (Tanzania) Simba | 2 | 2 | 4

Second round
(Angola) 1º de Agosto | 1 | 0 | 1
(Tanzania) Simba | 3 | 1 | 4

First round
1 | (Madagascar) CFFA | 2 | 1 | 3
4 | (Eswatini) Royal Leopards | 3 | 2 | 5
3 | (Lesotho) Matlama | 0 | 0 | 0
2 | (Cameroon) Coton Sport | 3 | 1 | 4

Second round
(Eswatini) Royal Leopards | 1 | 1 | 2
(Cameroon) Coton Sport | 1 | 2 | 3

First round
1 | (Burkina Faso) Rail Club du Kadiogo (p) | 0 | 1 | 1 (3)
4 | (Ghana) Asante Kotoko | 1 | 0 | 1 (1)
3 | (Botswana) Gaborone United | 1 | 1 | 2
2 | (Democratic Republic of the Congo) AS Vita Club | 0 | 3 | 3

Second round
(Burkina Faso) Rail Club du Kadiogo | 0 | 0 | 0 (3)
(Democratic Republic of the Congo) AS Vita Club (p) | 0 | 0 | 0 (4)

== First round ==
The first round, also called the first preliminary round, included the 52 teams that did not receive byes to the second round.

| Team 1 | Agg. | Team 2 | 1st leg | 2nd leg |
|---|---|---|---|---|
| Rivers United (Nigeria) | 3–1 | (Liberia) Watanga | 3–0 | 0–1 |
| AS Stade Mandji (Gabon) | 2–3 | (Nigeria) Plateau United | 2–2 | 0–1 |
| ASN Nigelec (Niger) | 2–1 | (Guinea) SOA Renaissante | 2–1 | 0–0 |
| APR (Rwanda) | 1–3 | (Tunisia) Union Monastirienne | 1–0 | 0–3 |
| Olympic Real de Bangui (Central African Republic) | 0–4 | (Uganda) Vipers | 0–3 | 0–1 |
| Volcan Club (Comoros) | w/o (Note: La Passe won on a walkover after Volcan Club failed to appear for the second leg.) | (Seychelles) La Passe | 1–0 | — |
| Coton Sport Benin | 1–4 | (Ivory Coast) ASEC Mimosas | 1–2 | 0–2 |
| Hawks (The Gambia) | w/o (Note: Horoya won on a walkover after Hawks withdrew from the competition citing financial reasons.) | (Guinea) Horoya | — | — |
| ASKO Kara (Togo) | 2–1 | (Mauritania) FC Nouadhibou | 1–1 | 1–0 |
| Casa Sports (Senegal) | 1–3 | (Algeria) JS Kabylie | 1–0 | 0–3 |
| Deportivo Mongomo (Equatorial Guinea) | 2–5 | (Mali) Djoliba | 2–0 | 0–5 |
| Bo Rangers (Sierra Leone) | 0–3 | (Algeria) CR Belouizdad | 0–0 | 0–3 |
| Zalan (South Sudan) | 0–9 | (Tanzania) Young Africans | 0–4 | 0–5 |
| Saint George (Ethiopia) | 2–2 (a) | (Sudan) Al Hilal | 2–1 | 0–1 |
| Arta Solar (Djibouti) | 1–2 | (Sudan) Al Merrikh | 1–2 | 0–0 |
| KMKM (Zanzibar) | 0–6 | (Libya) Al Ahli Tripoli | 0–2 | 0–4 |
| Flambeau du Centre (Burundi) | 2–2 (a) | (Libya) Al Ittihad | 1–0 | 1–2 |
| Elect Sport (Chad) | 0–4 | (Egypt) Zamalek | 0–2 | 0–2 |
| Cape Town City (South Africa) | 2–0 | (Republic of the Congo) AS Otohô | 2–0 | 0–0 |
| Black Bulls (Mozambique) | 1–5 | (Angola) Petro de Luanda | 0–3 | 1–2 |
| Red Arrows (Zambia) | 1–2 | (Angola) 1º de Agosto | 0–1 | 1–1 |
| Nyasa Big Bullets (Malawi) | 0–4 | (Tanzania) Simba | 0–2 | 0–2 |
| CFFA (Madagascar) | 3–5 | (Eswatini) Royal Leopards | 2–3 | 1–2 |
| Matlama (Lesotho) | 0–4 | (Cameroon) Coton Sport | 0–3 | 0–1 |
| Rail Club du Kadiogo (Burkina Faso) | 1–1 (3–1 p) | (Ghana) Asante Kotoko | 0–1 | 1–0 |
| Gaborone United (Botswana) | 2–3 | (Democratic Republic of the Congo) AS Vita Club | 1–0 | 1–3 |

Notes:

11 September 2022
16:00 UTC+1

| Rivers United (Nigeria) | 3–0 | (Liberia) Watanga |
|---|---|---|
| Agu 8'; Duru 19'; Acquah 45' | Report |

Adokiye Amiesimaka Stadium, Port Harcourt
Referee: Stanislas Ahomlanto (Benin)
18 September 2022
16:00 UTC+0

| Watanga (Liberia) | 1–0 | (Nigeria) Rivers United |
|---|---|---|
| Logan 15' (pen.) | Report |

SKD Stadium, Monrovia
Referee: Swahib Bangura (Sierra Leone)

Rivers United won 3–1 on aggregate.

10 September 2022
15:30 UTC+1

| AS Stade Mandji (Gabon) | 2–2 | (Nigeria) Plateau United |
|---|---|---|
| Inounou 17'; Mbongui 45' | Report | Onyebuchi 9'; Rabiu 35' |

Stade de Franceville, Franceville
Referee: Abdou Abdel Mefire (Cameroon)
18 September 2022
16:00 UTC+1

| Plateau United (Nigeria) | 1–0 | (Gabon) AS Stade Mandji |
|---|---|---|
| Katoh 63' | Report |

Moshood Abiola National Stadium, Abuja
Referee: Vincent Kabore (Burkina Faso)

Plateau United won 3–2 on aggregate.

10 September 2022
16:30 UTC+1

| ASN Nigelec (Niger) | 2–1 | (Guinea) SOA Renaissante |
|---|---|---|
| Goumey 14', 65' | Report | N'diaye 46' |

Stade Général Seyni Kountché, Niamey
Referee: Julian Nii Nunoo (Ghana)
16 September 2022
16:00 UTC+0

| SOA Renaissante (Guinea) | 0–0 | (Niger) ASN Nigelec |
|---|---|---|
| | Report |

General Lansana Conté Stadium, Conakry
Referee: Raimundo Correia (Guinea-Bissau)

ASN Nigelec won 2–1 on aggregate.

10 September 2022
15:00 UTC+2

| APR (Rwanda) | 1–0 | (Tunisia) Union Monastirienne |
|---|---|---|
| Mugunga 18' | Report |

Stade Huye, Butare
Referee: Thierry Nkurunziza (Burundi)
18 September 2022
15:00 UTC+1

| Union Monastirienne (Tunisia) | 3–0 | (Rwanda) APR |
|---|---|---|
| Aloui 4'; Tka 27'; Oumarou 68' | Report |

Stade Mustapha Ben Jannet, Monastir
Referee: Jalal Jayed (Morocco)

Union Monastirienne won 3–1 on aggregate.

10 September 2022
20:00 UTC+1

| Olympic Real de Bangui (Central African Republic) | 0–3 | (Uganda) Vipers |
|---|---|---|
| | Report | Abdu 45+2'; Yiga 62'; Mubiru 84' |

Stade Alphonse Massemba-Débat, Brazzaville (Congo) (Note: Teams from the Central African Republic played their home matches outside the country, since none of the stadiums met the quality standards set according to the CAF regulations.)
Referee: Jean Pierre Kabangu (DR Congo)
17 September 2022
16:00 UTC+3

| Vipers (Uganda) | 1–0 | (Central African Republic) Olympic Real de Bangui |
|---|---|---|
| Sentamu 18' | Report |

St. Mary's Stadium-Kitende, Entebbe
Referee: Ring Malong (South Sudan)

Vipers won 4–0 on aggregate.

10 September 2022
15:30 UTC+3

| Volcan Club (Comoros) | 1–0 | (Seychelles) La Passe |
|---|---|---|
| Tsitafihy 13' | Report |

Stade Omnisports de Malouzini, Moroni
Referee: Thulani Sibandze (Eswatini)
16 September 2022
16:00 UTC+4

| La Passe (Seychelles) | Cancelled | (Comoros) Volcan Club |
|---|---|---|
| | Report |

National Sports Complex Pitch 1, Saint Pierre (Mauritius) (Note: Teams from Seychelles played their home matches outside the country, since none of the stadiums met the quality standards set according to the CAF regulations.)

La Passe won on walkover after Volcan Club failed to appear for the second leg.

11 September 2022
17:00 UTC+1

| Coton Sport Benin | 1–2 | (Ivory Coast) ASEC Mimosas |
|---|---|---|
| Bawa 6' (pen.) | Report | Kramo 2'; Zouzoua 70' |

Stade de l'Amitié, Cotonou
Referee: Brahamou Sadou Ali (Niger)
18 September 2022
16:00 UTC+0

| ASEC Mimosas (Ivory Coast) | 2–0 | Coton Sport Benin |
|---|---|---|
| Kramo 8'; Oura 90+4' | Report |

Stade de Yamoussoukro, Yamoussoukro
Referee: Abdulsalam Kassim (Nigeria)

ASEC Mimosas won 4–1 on aggregate.

11 September 2022
16:00 UTC+0

| ASKO Kara (Togo) | 1–1 | (Mauritania) FC Nouadhibou |
|---|---|---|
| Ouattara 46' | Report | El Abd 79' |

Stade de Kégué, Lomé
Referee: Clement Franklin Kpan (Ivory Coast)
17 September 2022
19:00 UTC+0

| FC Nouadhibou (Mauritania) | 0–1 | (Togo) ASKO Kara |
|---|---|---|
| | Report | Ouattara 3' |

Stade Cheikha Ould Boïdiya, Nouadhibou
Referee: Sekou Ahmed Touré (Guinea)

ASKO Kara won 2–1 on aggregate.

11 September 2022
17:00 UTC+0

| Casa Sports (Senegal) | 1–0 | (Algeria) JS Kabylie |
|---|---|---|
| Sané 66' | Report |

Stade Lat-Dior, Thiès
Referee: Blaise Yuven Ngwa (Cameroon)
18 September 2022
19:00 UTC+1

| JS Kabylie (Algeria) | 3–0 | (Senegal) Casa Sports |
|---|---|---|
| Mouaki 9' (pen.); Nezla 45'; Boukhanchouche 85' | Report |

8 May 1945 Stadium, Sétif
Referee: Youssef Sraïri (Tunisia)

JS Kabylie won 3–1 on aggregate.

10 September 2022
16:00 UTC+1

| Deportivo Mongomo (Equatorial Guinea) | 2–0 | (Mali) Djoliba |
|---|---|---|
| Micha 7'; Ela 55' | Report |

Estadio de Mongomo, Mongomo
Referee: Patrice Mebiame (Gabon)
19 September 2022 (Note: The second leg of the Deportivo Mongomo v Djoliba tie, originally scheduled to be played on 18 September was postponed to 19 September, since Deportivo Mongomo was not able to arrive on time due to the airport restrictions at Modibo Keita International Airport.)
16:00 UTC+0

| Djoliba (Mali) | 5–0 | (Equatorial Guinea) Deportivo Mongomo |
|---|---|---|
| Da. Coulibaly 4'; O. Coulibaly 24' (pen.); Kamaté 32'; Soumaré 40'; Diallo 86' | Report |

Stade du 26 Mars, Bamako
Referee: El Hadji Amadou Sy (Senegal)

10 September 2022
16:00 UTC+0

| Bo Rangers (Sierra Leone) | 0–0 | (Algeria) CR Belouizdad |
|---|---|---|
| | Report |

SKD Stadium, Monrovia (Liberia) (Note: Teams from Sierra Leone played their home matches in Liberia, since their only stadium which satisfies the criteria of hosting international matches - the Siaka Steven Stadium in Freetown is undergoing long term renovations.)
Referee: Alhasan Bass (Gambia)
17 September 2022
19:30 UTC+1

| CR Belouizdad (Algeria) | 3–0 | (Sierra Leone) Bo Rangers |
|---|---|---|
| Keddad 33'; Aribi 86', 89' | Report |

8 May 1945 Stadium, Sétif
Referee: Shuhoub Abdulbasit (Libya)

CR Belouizdad won 3–0 on aggregate.

10 September 2022
16:00 UTC+3

| Zalan (South Sudan) | 0–4 | (Tanzania) Young Africans |
|---|---|---|
| | Report | Mayele 46', 85', 88'; Salum 56' |

National Stadium, Dar es Salaam (Tanzania) (Note: Teams from South Sudan played their home matches in Tanzania, since none of the stadiums met the quality standards set according to the CAF regulations.)
Referee: Idris Osman (Eritrea)
17 September 2022
19:00 UTC+3

| Young Africans (Tanzania) | 5–0 | (South Sudan) Zalan |
|---|---|---|
| Mussa 47'; Aziz Ki 58'; Mayele 60', 63', 66' | Report |

National Stadium, Dar es Salaam
Referee: Nsoro Ruzindana (Rwanda)

Young Africans won 9–0 on aggregate.

11 September 2022
16:00 UTC+3

| Saint George (Ethiopia) | 2–1 | (Sudan) Al Hilal |
|---|---|---|
| Gugsa 8', 30' | Report | Abdel Raouf 77' |

Bahir Dar Stadium, Bahir Dar
Referee: Mohamed Diraneh Guedi (Djibouti)
18 September 2022
19:00 UTC+2

| Al Hilal (Sudan) | 1–0 | (Ethiopia) Saint George |
|---|---|---|
| Lilepo 83' (pen.) | Report |

Al-Hilal Stadium, Omdurman
Referee: Omar Artan (Somalia)

2–2 on aggregate. Al Hilal won on away goals.

11 September 2022
17:00 UTC+3

| Arta Solar (Djibouti) | 1–2 | (Sudan) Al Merrikh |
|---|---|---|
| Idriss 10' | Report | Kambale 73'; N'Guessan 88' (o.g.) |

El Hadj Hassan Gouled Aptidon Stadium, Djibouti City
Referee: Tewodros Mitiku (Ethiopia)
17 September 2022
15:30 UTC+3

| Al Merrikh (Sudan) | 0–0 | (Djibouti) Arta Solar |
|---|---|---|
| | Report |

Bahir Dar Stadium, Bahir Dar (Ethiopia)
Referee: Mashood Ssali (Uganda)

Al Merrikh won 2–1 on aggregate.

10 September 2022
16:00 UTC+3

| KMKM (Zanzibar) | 0–2 | (Libya) Al Ahli Tripoli |
|---|---|---|
| | Report | Ayed 41' (pen.); Imhamed 65' |

Amaan Stadium, Zanzibar City
Referee: William Oloya (Uganda)
17 September 2022
20:00 UTC+2

| Al Ahli Tripoli (Libya) | 4–0 | (Zanzibar) KMKM |
|---|---|---|
| Tandia 21'; El Trbi 23', 76'; Al-Qadiri 85' | Report |

Benina Martyrs Stadium, Benghazi
Referee: Mustapha Kechaf (Morocco)

Al Ahli Tripoli won 6–0 on aggregate.

11 September 2022
16:00 UTC+3

| Flambeau du Centre (Burundi) | 1–0 | (Libya) Al Ittihad |
|---|---|---|
| Tuyihimbaze 22' | Report |

Chamazi Stadium, Dar es Salaam (Tanzania)
Referee: Elly Sasii (Tanzania)
18 September 2022
19:00 UTC+2

| Al Ittihad (Libya) | 2–1 | (Burundi) Flambeau du Centre |
|---|---|---|
| Eisay 3' (pen.); Al-Zaleetni 65' (pen.) | Report | Tuyihimbaze 20' |

Benina Martyrs Stadium, Benghazi
Referee: Youcef Gamouh (Algeria)

2–2 on aggregate. Flambeau du Centre won on away goals.

18 September 2022 (Note: The first and second leg of the Elect Sport v Zamalek tie, originally scheduled to be played between 9–11 September and 16–18 September, was postponed to 18 September and 25 September 2022 respectively due to Zamalek's participation in Saudi-Egyptian Super Cup.)
16:00 UTC+1

| Elect Sport (Chad) | 0–2 | (Egypt) Zamalek |
|---|---|---|
| | Report | Shikabala 50'; Zizo 56' |

Ahmadou Ahidjo Stadium, Yaoundé (Cameroon)
Referee: Jean-Piere Nguiene (Congo)
25 September 2022
20:00 UTC+2

| Zamalek (Egypt) | 2–0 | (Chad) Elect Sport |
|---|---|---|
| Zizo 71' (pen.); El-Wensh 79' | Report |

Cairo International Stadium, Cairo
Referee: Abdulrazg Ahmed (Libya)

Zamalek won 4–0 on aggregate.

10 September 2022
15:00 UTC+2

| Cape Town City (South Africa) | 2–0 | (Republic of the Congo) AS Otohô |
|---|---|---|
| Goedeman 51'; van Heerden 58' | Report |

Athlone Stadium, Cape Town
Referee: Artur Alfinar (Mozambique)
18 September 2022
15:30 UTC+1

| AS Otohô (Republic of the Congo) | 0–0 | (South Africa) Cape Town City |
|---|---|---|
| | Report |

Stade Alphonse Massemba-Débat, Brazzaville
Referee: Pousri Alfred (Chad)

Cape Town City won 2–0 on aggregate.

11 September 2022
15:00 UTC+2

| Black Bulls (Mozambique) | 0–3 | (Angola) Petro de Luanda |
|---|---|---|
| | Report | Azulão 64'; Cruz 75'; Pinto 82' |

Estádio do Zimpeto, Maputo
Referee: Audrick Nkole (Zambia)
17 September 2022
16:00 UTC+1

| Petro de Luanda (Angola) | 2–1 | (Mozambique) Black Bulls |
|---|---|---|
| Gilberto 14'; Azulão 27' | Report | Melque 9' |

Estádio 11 de Novembro, Luanda
Referee: Mohamed Athoumani (Comoros)

Petro de Luanda won 5–1 on aggregate.

10 September 2022
15:00 UTC+2

| Red Arrows (Zambia) | 0–1 | (Angola) 1º de Agosto |
|---|---|---|
| | Report | Zini 4' |

National Heroes Stadium, Lusaka
Referee: Keabetswe Dintwa (Botswana)
18 September 2022
16:00 UTC+1

| 1º de Agosto (Angola) | 1–1 | (Zambia) Red Arrows |
|---|---|---|
| Mawiya 15' | Report | Banda 7' |

Estádio 11 de Novembro, Luanda
Referee: Patrice Milazar (Mauritius)

1º de Agosto won 2–1 on aggregate.

10 September 2022
15:00 UTC+2

| Nyasa Big Bullets (Malawi) | 0–2 | (Tanzania) Simba |
|---|---|---|
| | Report | Phiri 30'; Bocco 81' |

Bingu National Stadium, Lilongwe
Referee: Thando Ndzandzeka (South Africa)
18 September 2022
16:00 UTC+3

| Simba (Tanzania) | 2–0 | (Malawi) Nyasa Big Bullets |
|---|---|---|
| Phiri 30', 51' | Report |

National Stadium, Dar es Salaam
Referee: Mahmood Ismail (Sudan)

Simba won 4–0 on aggregate.

11 September 2022
16:00 UTC+3

| CFFA (Madagascar) | 2–3 | (Eswatini) Royal Leopards |
|---|---|---|
| Razafindranaivo 31'; Razafindrasata 64' | Report | S. Dlamini 45'; Magagula 53'; Solonantenaina 80' (o.g.) |

Mahamasina Municipal Stadium, Antananarivo
Referee: José Chitumba (Angola)
17 September 2022
15:00 UTC+2

| Royal Leopards (Eswatini) | 2–1 | (Madagascar) CFFA |
|---|---|---|
| Zulu 78'; Sithole 84' | Report | Rafanomezantsoa 9' |

Somhlolo National Stadium, Lobamba
Referee: Abongile Tom (South Africa)

Royal Leopards won 5–3 on aggregate.

10 September 2022
16:00 UTC+2

| Matlama (Lesotho) | 0–3 | (Cameroon) Coton Sport |
|---|---|---|
| | Report | Eno 44'; Marou 62'; Kokolo 70' |

Free State Stadium, Bloemfontein (South Africa) (Note: Teams from Lesotho played their home matches in South Africa, since the Setsoto Stadium did not meet the quality standards set according to the CAF regulations.)
Referee: Andofetra Rakotojaona (Madagascar)
18 September 2022
18:00 UTC+1

| Coton Sport (Cameroon) | 1–0 | (Lesotho) Matlama |
|---|---|---|
| Eno 46' | Report |

Roumdé Adjia Stadium, Garoua
Referee: Pierre Kibingo (DR Congo)

Coton Sport won 4–0 on aggregate.

12 September 2022
18:00 UTC+1

| Rail Club du Kadiogo (Burkina Faso) | 0–1 | (Ghana) Asante Kotoko |
|---|---|---|
| | Report | Oppong 90+2' |

Stade de l'Amitié, Cotonou (Benin) (Note: Teams from Burkina Faso played their home matches outside the country, since none of the stadiums met the quality standards set according to the CAF regulations.)
Referee: Yelebodom Bodjona (Togo)
18 September 2022
15:00 UTC+0

| Asante Kotoko (Ghana) | 0–1 | (Burkina Faso) Rail Club du Kadiogo |
|---|---|---|
| | Report | Kambou 16' |
Penalties
| Mubarik (penalty scored); Safo-Taylor (penalty missed); Osei Bonsu (penalty missed); Morrison (penalty missed) | 1–3 | (penalty scored) Nikiéma; (penalty missed) Fa. Ouédraogo; (penalty scored) Kambou; (penalty scored) Sawadogo |

Baba Yara Stadium, Kumasi
Referee: Patrick Tanguy Vlei (Ivory Coast)

1–1 on aggregate. Rail Club du Kadiogo won 3–1 on penalties.

11 September 2022
17:00 UTC+1

| Gaborone United (Botswana) | 1–0 | (Democratic Republic of the Congo) AS Vita Club |
|---|---|---|
| Setsile 36' | Report |

Botswana National Stadium, Gaborone
Referee: Lebalang Mokete (Lesotho)
18 September 2022
15:30 UTC+1

| AS Vita Club (Democratic Republic of the Congo) | 3–1 | (Botswana) Gaborone United |
|---|---|---|
| Rozan 9'; Kabwe 35'; Tchakei 82' | Report | Kgaswane 26' |

Stade des Martyrs, Kinshasa
Referee: Christian Nkamba (Cameroon)

AS Vita Club won 3–2 on aggregate.

== Second round ==
The second round, also called the second preliminary round, included 32 teams: the 6 teams that received byes to this round, and the 26 winners of the first round.

| Team 1 | Agg. | Team 2 | 1st leg | 2nd leg |
|---|---|---|---|---|
| Rivers United (Nigeria) | 2–7 | (Morocco) Wydad AC | 2–1 | 0–6 |
| Plateau United (Nigeria) | 2–2 (a) | (Tunisia) Espérance de Tunis | 2–1 | 0–1 |
| ASN Nigelec (Niger) | 0–3 | (Morocco) Raja CA | 0–2 | 0–1 |
| Union Monastirienne (Tunisia) | 0–4 | (Egypt) Al Ahly | 0–1 | 0–3 |
| Vipers (Uganda) | 0–0 (4–2 p) | (Democratic Republic of the Congo) TP Mazembe | 0–0 | 0–0 |
| La Passe (Seychelles) | 1–15 | (South Africa) Mamelodi Sundowns | 0–7 | 1–8 |
| ASEC Mimosas (Ivory Coast) | 1–2 | (Guinea) Horoya | 0–1 | 1–1 |
| ASKO Kara (Togo) | 2–3 | (Algeria) JS Kabylie | 1–2 | 1–1 |
| Djoliba (Mali) | 2–3 | (Algeria) CR Belouizdad | 2–1 | 0–2 |
| Young Africans (Tanzania) | 1–2 | (Sudan) Al Hilal | 1–1 | 0–1 |
| Al Merrikh (Sudan) | 3–3 (a) | (Libya) Al Ahli Tripoli | 2–0 | 1–3 |
| Flambeau du Centre (Burundi) | 1–6 | (Egypt) Zamalek | 0–1 | 1–5 |
| Cape Town City (South Africa) | 0–4 | (Angola) Petro de Luanda | 0–3 | 0–1 |
| 1º de Agosto (Angola) | 1–4 | (Tanzania) Simba | 1–3 | 0–1 |
| Royal Leopards (Eswatini) | 2–3 | (Cameroon) Coton Sport | 1–1 | 1–2 |
| Rail Club du Kadiogo (Burkina Faso) | 0–0 (3–4 p) | (Democratic Republic of the Congo) AS Vita Club | 0–0 | 0–0 |

9 October 2022
16:00 UTC+1

| Rivers United (Nigeria) | 2–1 | (Morocco) Wydad AC |
|---|---|---|
| Ohawume 33'; Acquah 54' | Report | Sambou 31' |

Adokiye Amiesimaka Stadium, Port Harcourt
Referee: Kalilou Traore (Ivory Coast)
16 October 2022
20:00 UTC+1

| Wydad AC (Morocco) | 6–0 | (Nigeria) Rivers United |
|---|---|---|
| El Amloud 32'; Jabrane 44' (pen.), 69' (pen.); Sambou 49', 56'; Ahadad 90' | Report |

Stade Mohammed V, Casablanca
Referee: Sadok Selmi (Tunisia)

Wydad AC won 7–2 on aggregate.

9 October 2022
16:00 UTC+1

| Plateau United (Nigeria) | 2–1 | (Tunisia) Espérance de Tunis |
|---|---|---|
| Onyebuchi 35'; Mustapha 45+1' | Report | Badri 27' |

Moshood Abiola National Stadium, Abuja
Referee: Daniel Nii Laryea (Ghana)
15 October 2022
17:00 UTC+1

| Espérance de Tunis (Tunisia) | 1–0 | (Nigeria) Plateau United |
|---|---|---|
| Ben Romdhane 83' (pen.) | Report |

Stade Hammadi Agrebi, Tunis
Referee: Ibrahim Nour El Din (Egypt)

2–2 on aggregate. Espérance de Tunis won on away goals.

8 October 2022
16:30 UTC+1

| ASN Nigelec (Niger) | 0–2 | (Morocco) Raja CA |
|---|---|---|
| | Report | Habti 66'; Benjdida 90' |

Stade Général Seyni Kountché, Niamey
Referee: Gnama Aklesso (Togo)
15 October 2022
18:00 UTC+1

| Raja CA (Morocco) | 1–0 | (Niger) ASN Nigelec |
|---|---|---|
| Nahiri 79' | Report |

Stade Mohammed V, Casablanca
Referee: Mashood Ssali (Uganda)

Raja CA won 3–0 on aggregate.

9 October 2022
15:00 UTC+1

| Union Monastirienne (Tunisia) | 0–1 | (Egypt) Al Ahly |
|---|---|---|
| | Report | Abdelmonem 90' |

Stade Mustapha Ben Jannet, Monastir
Referee: Lahlou Benbraham (Algeria)
15 October 2022
18:00 UTC+2

| Al Ahly (Egypt) | 3–0 | (Tunisia) Union Monastirienne |
|---|---|---|
| Abdel Kader 15'; Fathy 43', 57' | Report |

Al Ahly WE Al Salam Stadium, Cairo
Referee: Janny Sikazwe (Zambia)

Al Ahly won 4–0 on aggregate.

9 October 2022
16:00 UTC+3

| Vipers (Uganda) | 0–0 | (Democratic Republic of the Congo) TP Mazembe |
|---|---|---|
| | Report |

St. Mary's Stadium-Kitende, Entebbe
Referee: Sabri Mohamed Fadul (Sudan)
15 October 2022
15:00 UTC+2

| TP Mazembe (Democratic Republic of the Congo) | 0–0 | (Uganda) Vipers |
|---|---|---|
| | Report |
Penalties
| Mwape (penalty missed); Luzolo (penalty scored); Likonza (penalty missed); Mpeko (penalty scored) | 2–4 | (penalty scored) Anukani; (penalty scored) Galiwango; (penalty scored) Mandela; (penalty scored) Omajondo |

Stade TP Mazembe, Lubumbashi
Referee: Victor Gomes (South Africa)

0–0 on aggregate. Vipers won 4–2 on penalties.

9 October 2022
16:00 UTC+2

| La Passe (Seychelles) | 0–7 | (South Africa) Mamelodi Sundowns |
|---|---|---|
| | Report | Kekana 1'; Sirino 13', 44'; Jupitor 20' (o.g.); Modiba 40'; Mbule 59'; Mkhulise 87' |

Loftus Versfeld Stadium, Pretoria (South Africa)
Referee: Hélder Martins (Angola)
14 October 2022
18:00 UTC+2

| Mamelodi Sundowns (South Africa) | 8–1 | (Seychelles) La Passe |
|---|---|---|
| Morena 8'; Mailula 38', 45', 86'; Motupa 70', 90+2'; Domingo 76'; Maema 78' | Report | Rajaonaisy 37' |

Loftus Versfeld Stadium, Pretoria
Referee: Mahmoud El Banna (Egypt)

Mamelodi Sundowns won 15–1 on aggregate

9 October 2022
16:00 UTC+0

| ASEC Mimosas (Ivory Coast) | 0–1 | (Guinea) Horoya |
|---|---|---|
| | Report | P. Ndiaye 57' |

Stade de Yamoussoukro, Yamoussoukro
Referee: Lotfi Bekouassa (Algeria)
16 October 2022
16:00 UTC+0

| Horoya (Guinea) | 1–1 | (Ivory Coast) ASEC Mimosas |
|---|---|---|
| Fofana 90+2' | Report | Kramo 73' |

General Lansana Conté Stadium, Conakry
Referee: Bakary Gassama (Gambia)

Horoya won 2–1 on aggregate.

8 October 2022
15:00 UTC+0

| ASKO Kara (Togo) | 1–2 | (Algeria) JS Kabylie |
|---|---|---|
| Ouattara 72' | Report | Alili 15'; Ouattara 18' |

Stade de Kégué, Lomé
Referee: Joseph Ogabor (Nigeria)
15 October 2022
19:00 UTC+1

| JS Kabylie (Algeria) | 1–1 | (Togo) ASKO Kara |
|---|---|---|
| Boumechra 17' | Report | Avotor 88' |

8 May 1945 Stadium, Sétif
Referee: Mohammad Maarouf (Egypt)

JS Kabylie won 3–2 on aggregate.

9 October 2022
16:00 UTC+0

| Djoliba (Mali) | 2–1 | (Algeria) CR Belouizdad |
|---|---|---|
| Camara 2'; Da. Coulibaly 74' | Report | Belkhir 11' |

Stade du 26 Mars, Bamako
Referee: Maguette N'Diaye (Senegal)
14 October 2022
19:00 UTC+1

| CR Belouizdad (Algeria) | 2–0 | (Mali) Djoliba |
|---|---|---|
| Rebiai 27'; Bourdim 80' | Report |

8 May 1945 Stadium, Sétif
Referee: Mehrez Malki (Tunisia)

CR Belouizdad won 3–2 on aggregate.

8 October 2022
16:00 UTC+3

| Young Africans (Tanzania) | 1–1 | (Sudan) Al Hilal |
|---|---|---|
| Mayele 51' | Report | Abdelrahman 67' |

National Stadium, Dar es Salaam
Referee: Samuel Uwikunda (Rwanda)
16 October 2022
19:00 UTC+2

| Al Hilal (Sudan) | 1–0 | (Tanzania) Young Africans |
|---|---|---|
| Abdelrahman 3' | Report |

Al-Hilal Stadium, Omdurman
Referee: Bamlak Tessema Weyesa (Ethiopia)

Al Hilal won 2–1 on aggregate.

7 October 2022
16:00 UTC+2

| Al Merrikh (Sudan) | 2–0 | (Libya) Al Ahli Tripoli |
|---|---|---|
| Kambale 29'; Nouh 39' | Report |

El-Obeid Stadium, El-Obeid
Referee: Pacifique Ndabihawenimana (Burundi)
15 October 2022
19:00 UTC+2

| Al Ahli Tripoli (Libya) | 3–1 | (Sudan) Al Merrikh |
|---|---|---|
| El Monir 38'; Al Qulaib 45'; Arqoub 81' | Report | Agab 11' (pen.) |

Benina Martyrs Stadium, Benghazi
Referee: Rédouane Jiyed (Morocco)

3–3 on aggregate. Al Merrikh won on away goals.

9 October 2022
16:00 UTC+3

| Flambeau du Centre (Burundi) | 0–1 | (Egypt) Zamalek |
|---|---|---|
| | Report | Abdelmaguid 42' |

Borg El Arab Stadium, Alexandria (Egypt)
Referee: Hassan Hagi (Somalia)
14 October 2022
19:00 UTC+2

| Zamalek (Egypt) | 5–1 | (Burundi) Flambeau du Centre |
|---|---|---|
| Zizo 3' (pen.), 39', 87'; Ndiaye 32'; Osama 90' | Report | Gakwaya 25' |

Borg El Arab Stadium, Alexandria
Referee: Samir Guezzaz (Morocco)

Zamalek won 6–1 on aggregate.

8 October 2022
18:00 UTC+2

| Cape Town City (South Africa) | 0–3 | (Angola) Petro de Luanda |
|---|---|---|
| | Report | Gleison 38'; Azulão 48' (pen.), 62' |

Cape Town Stadium, Cape Town
Referee: Bernard Camille (Seychelles)
14 October 2022
16:00 UTC+1

| Petro de Luanda (Angola) | 1–0 | (South Africa) Cape Town City |
|---|---|---|
| Cabibi 87' | Report |

Estádio 11 de Novembro, Luanda
Referee: Mohamed Athoumani (Comoros)

Petro de Luanda won 4–0 on aggregate.

9 October 2022
16:00 UTC+1

| 1º de Agosto (Angola) | 1–3 | (Tanzania) Simba |
|---|---|---|
| Tshibamba 77' (pen.) | Report | Chama 9'; Mwenda 63'; Phiri 75' |

Estádio 11 de Novembro, Luanda
Referee: Joshua Bondo (Botswana)
16 October 2022
16:00 UTC+3

| Simba (Tanzania) | 1–0 | (Angola) 1º de Agosto |
|---|---|---|
| Phiri 34' | Report |

National Stadium, Dar es Salaam
Referee: Abongile Tom (South Africa)

Simba won 4–1 on aggregate.

9 October 2022
15:00 UTC+2

| Royal Leopards (Eswatini) | 1–1 | (Cameroon) Coton Sport |
|---|---|---|
| Matse 30' | Report | Marou 3' |

Mavuso Sports Centre, Manzini
Referee: Janny Sikazwe (Zambia)
16 October 2022
17:00 UTC+1

| Coton Sport (Cameroon) | 2–1 | (Eswatini) Royal Leopards |
|---|---|---|
| Marou 29'; Wassou 41' | Report | Zulu 72' |

Roumdé Adjia Stadium, Garoua
Referee: Jean-Jacques Ndala Ngambo (DR Congo)

Coton Sport won 3–2 on aggregate.

16 October 2022 (Note: The first and second leg of the Rail Club du Kadiogo v AS Vita Club tie, originally scheduled to be played between 8–9 October and 14–16 October, was postponed to 16 October and 20 October 2022 respectively due to the September 2022 Burkina Faso coup d'état.)
15:00 UTC+1

| Rail Club du Kadiogo (Burkina Faso) | 0–0 | (Democratic Republic of the Congo) AS Vita Club |
|---|---|---|
| | Report |

Stade de l'Amitié, Cotonou (Benin)
Referee: Issa Mouhamed (Benin)
20 October 2022
15:30 UTC+1

| AS Vita Club (Democratic Republic of the Congo) | 0–0 | (Burkina Faso) Rail Club du Kadiogo |
|---|---|---|
| | Report |
Penalties
| Mangoba (penalty scored); Zilu (penalty scored); Ebunga (penalty scored) | 4–3 | (penalty missed) Nikiéma; (penalty scored) Soré; (penalty missed) Kambou; (penalty scored) Coulibaly; (penalty scored) Dao |

Stade des Martyrs, Kinshasa
Referee: Pierre Atcho (Gabon)

0–0 on aggregate. AS Vita Club won 4–3 on penalties.
