= 2022–23 CAF Champions League =

2022–23 TotalEnergies CAF Champions League
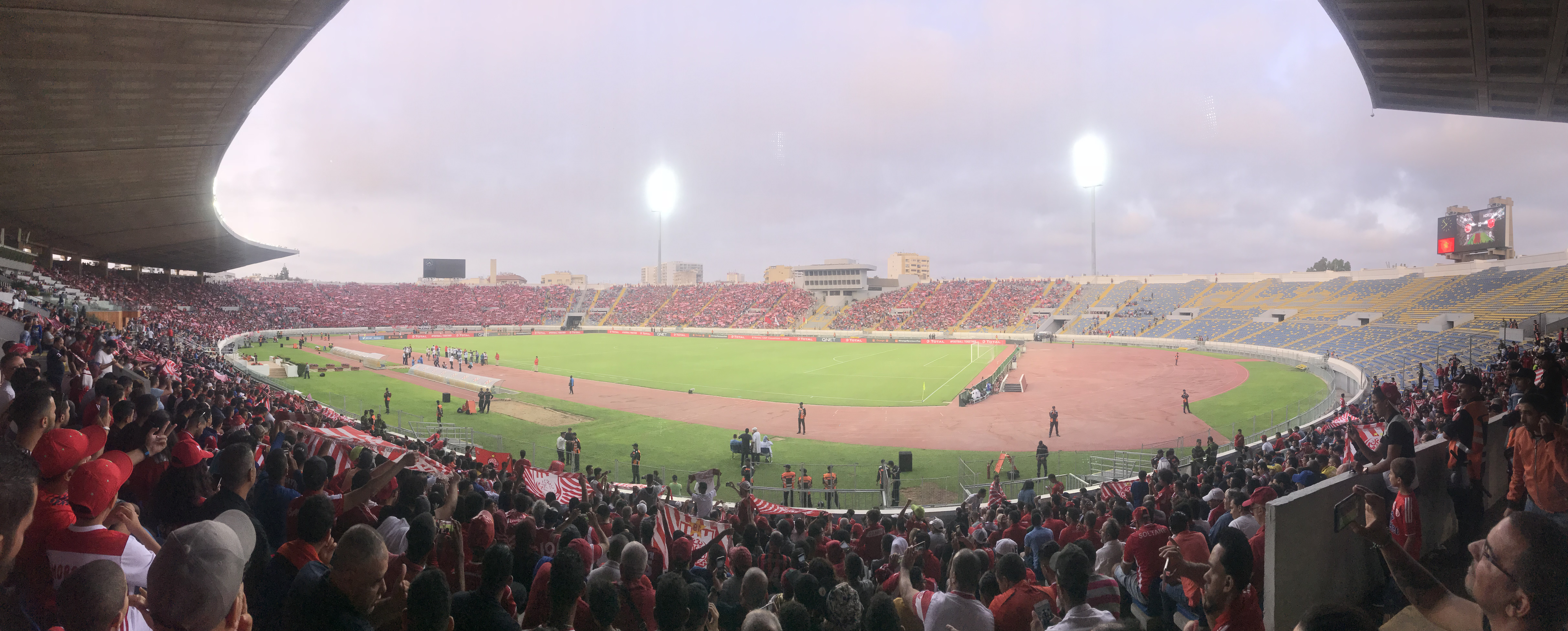
- Stade Mohammed V hosted the podium where Al Ahly lifted the trophy

Tournament details
- Dates: Qualification: 10 September – 20 October 2022: Main Phase: 10 February – 11 June 2023
- Teams: Main Competition: 16; Total: 58 (from 46 associations)

Final positions
- Champions: (Egypt) Al Ahly (11th title)
- Runners-up: (Morocco) Wydad AC

Tournament statistics
- Matches played: 62
- Goals scored: 136 (2.19 per match)
- Top scorer(s): (Egypt) Mahmoud Kahraba (Namibia) Peter Shalulile (6 goals each)
- (Note: All statistics do not include qualifying play-offs)

The 2022–23 CAF Champions League (officially the 2022–23 TotalEnergies CAF Champions League for sponsorship purposes) was the 59th season of Africa's premier club football tournament organized by the Confederation of African Football (CAF) and the 27th under the current CAF Champions League title.

Unlike the last three seasons, the final of this edition was played in a two-legged format as per the decision of CAF at the executive committee meeting on July 3 at Rabat, arising from a formal complaint made by Al Ahly to CAF over the choice of Stade Mohammed V in Casablanca as the venue for the 2022 final: despite the intention that the final be played at a neutral venue, the 2022 tournament culminated with the stadium being the home venue of their opponent, Wydad AC.

The winners, Al Ahly for the record-extending 11th title, automatically qualified for the 2023–24 CAF Champions League and earned the right to play against the winners of the 2022–23 CAF Confederation Cup in the 2023 CAF Super Cup along with the 2023 FIFA Club World Cup in Saudi Arabia.

Wydad AC were the defending champions, but they lost the final against Al Ahly.

== Association team allocation ==
A total of 46 out of the 56 CAF member associations entered this season's CAF Champions League, with the 12 highest ranked associations according to their CAF 5-year ranking eligible to enter two teams in this season. As a result, theoretically a maximum of 68 teams could enter the tournament – although this level has never been reached.

For this season of the tournament, CAF used the 2018–2022 CAF 5-year ranking, which calculates points for each entrant association based on their clubs’ performance over those 5 years in CAF club competitions. The criteria for points are as follows:

| | CAF Champions League | CAF Confederation Cup |
|---|---|---|
| Winners | 6 points | 5 points |
| Runners-up | 5 points | 4 points |
| Losing semi-finalists | 4 points | 3 points |
| Losing quarter-finalists | 3 points | 2 points |
| 3rd place in groups | 2 points | 1 point |
| 4th place in groups | 1 point | 0.5 point |

The points are multiplied by a coefficient according to the year as follows:

- 2021–22: x 5
- 2020–21: × 4
- 2019–20: × 3
- 2018–19: × 2
- 2018: × 1

== Teams ==
The following 58 teams from 46 associations participated in this edition of the competition.

- Teams in **bold** received a bye to the second round.
- The other teams entered the first round.

Associations are shown according to their 2018–2022 CAF 5-year ranking – those with a ranking score have their rank and score (in parentheses) indicated.

Associations eligible to enter two teams (Top 12 associations)
| Association | Rank (Pts) | Team | Qualifying method |
|---|---|---|---|
| Morocco | 1 (194) | **Wydad AC** | Title holders (2021–22 CAF Champions League winners); 2021–22 Botola champions |
| Morocco | 1 (194) | **Raja CA** | 2021–22 Botola runners-up |
| Egypt | 2 (176) | Zamalek | 2021–22 Egyptian Premier League 1st place after 24 rounds |
| Egypt | 2 (176) | **Al Ahly** | 2021–22 Egyptian Premier League 2nd place after 24 rounds |
| Algeria | 3 (115) | CR Belouizdad | 2021–22 Algerian Ligue Professionnelle 1 champions |
| Algeria | 3 (115) | JS Kabylie | 2021–22 Algerian Ligue Professionnelle 1 runners-up |
| Tunisia | 4 (113) | **Espérance de Tunis** | 2021–22 Tunisian Ligue Professionnelle 1 champions |
| Tunisia | 4 (113) | Union Monastirienne | 2021–22 Tunisian Ligue Professionnelle 1 runners-up |
| South Africa | 5 (109.5) | **Mamelodi Sundowns** | 2021–22 South African Premier Division champions |
| South Africa | 5 (109.5) | Cape Town City | 2021–22 South African Premier Division runners-up |
| DR Congo | 6 (63) | **TP Mazembe** | 2021–22 Linafoot champions |
| DR Congo | 6 (63) | AS Vita Club | 2021–22 Linafoot runners-up |
| Angola | 7 (46) | Petro de Luanda | 2021–22 Girabola champions |
| Angola | 7 (46) | 1º de Agosto | 2021–22 Girabola runners-up |
| Sudan | 8 (33.5) | Al Hilal | 2021–22 Sudan Premier League champions |
| Sudan | 8 (33.5) | Al Merrikh | 2021–22 Sudan Premier League runners-up |
| Libya | 9 (33) | Al Ittihad | 2021–22 Libyan Premier League champions |
| Libya | 9 (33) | Al Ahli Tripoli | 2021–22 Libyan Premier League runners-up |
| Guinea | 10 (31) | Horoya | 2021–22 Guinée Championnat National champions |
| Guinea | 10 (31) | SOA Renaissante | 2021–22 Guinée Championnat National runners-up |
| Tanzania | 11 (30.5) | Young Africans | 2021–22 Tanzanian Premier League champions |
| Tanzania | 11 (30.5) | Simba | 2021–22 Tanzanian Premier League runners-up |
| Nigeria | 12 (26) | Rivers United | 2021–22 Nigeria Professional Football League champions |
| Nigeria | 12 (26) | Plateau United | 2021–22 Nigeria Professional Football League runners-up |

Associations eligible to enter one team
| Association | Rank (Pts) | Team | Qualifying method |
|---|---|---|---|
| Zambia | 13 (24.5) | Red Arrows | 2021–22 Zambia Super League champions |
| Cameroon | 14 (14.5) | Coton Sport | 2021–22 Elite One champions |
| Senegal | 15 (12) | Casa Sports | 2021–22 Senegal Ligue 1 champions |
| Ivory Coast | 16 (10.5) | ASEC Mimosas | 2021–22 Côte d'Ivoire Ligue 1 champions |
| Congo | 17 (8) | AS Otohô | 2021–22 Congo Premier League champions |
| Botswana | 18 (6) | Gaborone United | 2021–22 Botswana Premier League champions |
| Eswatini | 21 (3.5) | Royal Leopards | 2021–22 Eswatini Premier League champions |
| Mali | 21 (3.5) | Djoliba | 2021–22 Malian Première Division champions |
| Burkina Faso | 23 (3) | Rail Club du Kadiogo | 2021–22 Burkinabé Premier League champions |
| Niger | 24 (2.5) | ASN Nigelec | 2021–22 Niger Premier League champions |
| Ghana | 24 (2.5) | Asante Kotoko | 2021–22 Ghana Premier League champions |
| Rwanda | 26 (2) | APR | 2021–22 Rwanda Premier League champions |
| Uganda | 26 (2) | Vipers | 2021–22 Uganda Premier League champions |
| Mauritania | 28 (1.5) | FC Nouadhibou | 2021–22 Ligue 1 Mauritania champions |
| Benin | 28 (1.5) | Coton FC | 2021–22 Benin Premier League champions |
| Mozambique | 30 (1) | Black Bulls | 2021 Moçambola champions |
| Togo | 30 (1) | ASKO Kara | 2021–22 Togolese Championnat National champions |
| Burundi | — | Flambeau du Centre | 2021–22 Burundi Ligue A champions |
| Central African Republic | — | Olympic Real de Bangui | 2021–22 Central African Republic League champions |
| Chad | — | Elect Sport | 2021–22 Chad Premier League champions |
| Comoros | — | Volcan Club | 2021–22 Comoros Premier League champions |
| Djibouti | — | Arta Solar | 2021–22 Djibouti Premier League champions |
| Equatorial Guinea | — | Deportivo Mongomo | 2021–22 Equatoguinean Primera División champions |
| Ethiopia | — | Saint George | 2021–22 Ethiopian Premier League champions |
| Gabon | — | AS Stade Mandji | 2021–22 Gabon Championnat National D1 champions |
| Gambia | — | Hawks | 2021–22 GFA League First Division champions |
| Lesotho | — | Matlama | 2021–22 Lesotho Premier League champions |
| Liberia | — | Watanga | 2021–22 LFA First Division champions |
| Madagascar | — | CFFA | 2021–22 Malagasy Pro League champions |
| Malawi | — | Nyasa Big Bullets | 2020–21 Super League of Malawi champions |
| Seychelles | — | La Passe | 2021–22 Seychelles Premier League champions |
| Sierra Leone | — | Bo Rangers | 2021–22 Sierra Leone National Premier League champions |
| South Sudan | — | Zalan | 2021–22 South Sudan Premier League champions |
| Zanzibar | — | KMKM | 2021–22 Zanzibar Premier League champions |

Associations which did not enter a team

- Kenya
- Zimbabwe
- Cape Verde
- Eritrea
- Guinea-Bissau
- Mauritius
- Namibia
- Réunion
- São Tomé and Príncipe
- Somalia

Notes:

1. Egypt (EGY):The 2021–22 Egyptian Premier League was not finished by the CAF deadline. As a result, the Egyptian Football Association announced that Zamalek and Al Ahly, who were at first and second place after 24 rounds respectively, represented Egypt in the 2022–23 CAF Champions League. Meanwhile, Future and Pyramids FC, who were at third and fourth place after 24 rounds respectively, represented Egypt in the 2022–23 CAF Confederation Cup.

== Schedule ==
The official competition schedule was released on 24 June 2022 on their website to prepare the qualified teams for the upcoming season.

Schedule for the 2022–23 CAF Champions League
| Phase | Round | Draw date | First leg | Second leg |
|---|---|---|---|---|
| Qualifying rounds | First round | 9 August 2022 | 9–11 September 2022 | 16–18 September 2022 |
| Qualifying rounds | Second round | 9 August 2022 | 7–9 October 2022 | 14–16 October 2022 |
| Group stage | Matchday 1 | 12 December 2022 | 10–11 February 2023 | |
| Group stage | Matchday 2 | 12 December 2022 | 17–18 February 2023 | |
| Group stage | Matchday 3 | 12 December 2022 | 24–25 February 2023 | |
| Group stage | Matchday 4 | 12 December 2022 | 7–11 March 2023 | |
| Group stage | Matchday 5 | 12 December 2022 | 17–18 March 2023 | |
| Group stage | Matchday 6 | 12 December 2022 | 31 March – 1 April 2023 | |
| Knockout stage | Quarter-finals | 5 April 2023 | 21–22 April 2023 | 28–29 April 2023 |
| Knockout stage | Semi-finals | 5 April 2023 | 12–13 May 2023 | 19–20 May 2023 |
| Knockout stage | Final | 5 April 2023 | 4 June 2023 | 11 June 2023 |

== Qualifying rounds ==
The draw for the qualifying rounds was held on 9 August 2022 at the CAF headquarters in Cairo, Egypt. In the qualifying rounds, each tie was played on a home-and-away two-legged basis. If the aggregate score was tied after the second leg, the away goals rule was applied, and if still tied, extra time was not played, and the penalty shoot-out was used to determine the winner (Regulations III. 13 & 14).

=== First round ===
| Team 1 | Agg. | Team 2 | 1st leg | 2nd leg |
|---|---|---|---|---|
| Rivers United (Nigeria) | 3–1 | (Liberia) Watanga | 3–0 | 0–1 |
| AS Stade Mandji (Gabon) | 2–3 | (Nigeria) Plateau United | 2–2 | 0–1 |
| ASN Nigelec (Niger) | 2–1 | (Guinea) SOA Renaissante | 2–1 | 0–0 |
| APR (Rwanda) | 1–3 | (Tunisia) Union Monastirienne | 1–0 | 0–3 |
| Olympic Real de Bangui (Central African Republic) | 0–4 | (Uganda) Vipers | 0–3 | 0–1 |
| Volcan Club (Comoros) | w/o (Note: La Passe won on a walkover after Volcan Club failed to appear for the second leg.) | (Seychelles) La Passe | 1–0 | — |
| Coton Sport Benin | 1–4 | (Ivory Coast) ASEC Mimosas | 1–2 | 0–2 |
| Hawks (The Gambia) | w/o (Note: Horoya won on a walkover after Hawks withdrew from the competition citing financial reasons.) | (Guinea) Horoya | — | — |
| ASKO Kara (Togo) | 2–1 | (Mauritania) FC Nouadhibou | 1–1 | 1–0 |
| Casa Sports (Senegal) | 1–3 | (Algeria) JS Kabylie | 1–0 | 0–3 |
| Deportivo Mongomo (Equatorial Guinea) | 2–5 | (Mali) Djoliba | 2–0 | 0–5 |
| Bo Rangers (Sierra Leone) | 0–3 | (Algeria) CR Belouizdad | 0–0 | 0–3 |
| Zalan (South Sudan) | 0–9 | (Tanzania) Young Africans | 0–4 | 0–5 |
| Saint George (Ethiopia) | 2–2 (a) | (Sudan) Al Hilal | 2–1 | 0–1 |
| Arta Solar (Djibouti) | 1–2 | (Sudan) Al Merrikh | 1–2 | 0–0 |
| KMKM (Zanzibar) | 0–6 | (Libya) Al Ahli Tripoli | 0–2 | 0–4 |
| Flambeau du Centre (Burundi) | 2–2 (a) | (Libya) Al Ittihad | 1–0 | 1–2 |
| Elect Sport (Chad) | 0–4 | (Egypt) Zamalek | 0–2 | 0–2 |
| Cape Town City (South Africa) | 2–0 | (Republic of the Congo) AS Otohô | 2–0 | 0–0 |
| Black Bulls (Mozambique) | 1–5 | (Angola) Petro de Luanda | 0–3 | 1–2 |
| Red Arrows (Zambia) | 1–2 | (Angola) 1º de Agosto | 0–1 | 1–1 |
| Nyasa Big Bullets (Malawi) | 0–4 | (Tanzania) Simba | 0–2 | 0–2 |
| CFFA (Madagascar) | 3–5 | (Eswatini) Royal Leopards | 2–3 | 1–2 |
| Matlama (Lesotho) | 0–4 | (Cameroon) Coton Sport | 0–3 | 0–1 |
| Rail Club du Kadiogo (Burkina Faso) | 1–1 (3–1 p) | (Ghana) Asante Kotoko | 0–1 | 1–0 |
| Gaborone United (Botswana) | 2–3 | (Democratic Republic of the Congo) AS Vita Club | 1–0 | 1–3 |

=== Second round ===
The 16 winners of the second round advanced to the group stage, while the 16 losers of the second round entered the CAF Confederation Cup playoff round.

| Team 1 | Agg. | Team 2 | 1st leg | 2nd leg |
|---|---|---|---|---|
| Rivers United (Nigeria) | 2–7 | (Morocco) Wydad AC | 2–1 | 0–6 |
| Plateau United (Nigeria) | 2–2 (a) | (Tunisia) Espérance de Tunis | 2–1 | 0–1 |
| ASN Nigelec (Niger) | 0–3 | (Morocco) Raja CA | 0–2 | 0–1 |
| Union Monastirienne (Tunisia) | 0–4 | (Egypt) Al Ahly | 0–1 | 0–3 |
| Vipers (Uganda) | 0–0 (4–2 p) | (Democratic Republic of the Congo) TP Mazembe | 0–0 | 0–0 |
| La Passe (Seychelles) | 1–15 | (South Africa) Mamelodi Sundowns | 0–7 | 1–8 |
| ASEC Mimosas (Ivory Coast) | 1–2 | (Guinea) Horoya | 0–1 | 1–1 |
| ASKO Kara (Togo) | 2–3 | (Algeria) JS Kabylie | 1–2 | 1–1 |
| Djoliba (Mali) | 2–3 | (Algeria) CR Belouizdad | 2–1 | 0–2 |
| Young Africans (Tanzania) | 1–2 | (Sudan) Al Hilal | 1–1 | 0–1 |
| Al Merrikh (Sudan) | 3–3 (a) | (Libya) Al Ahli Tripoli | 2–0 | 1–3 |
| Flambeau du Centre (Burundi) | 1–6 | (Egypt) Zamalek | 0–1 | 1–5 |
| Cape Town City (South Africa) | 0–4 | (Angola) Petro de Luanda | 0–3 | 0–1 |
| 1º de Agosto (Angola) | 1–4 | (Tanzania) Simba | 1–3 | 0–1 |
| Royal Leopards (Eswatini) | 2–3 | (Cameroon) Coton Sport | 1–1 | 1–2 |
| Rail Club du Kadiogo (Burkina Faso) | 0–0 (3–4 p) | (Democratic Republic of the Congo) AS Vita Club | 0–0 | 0–0 |

== Group stage ==
Location of teams of the 2022–23 CAF Champions League group stage.
Brown: Group A; Red: Group B; Orange: Group C; Yellow: Group D.

The draw for the group stage was held on 12 December 2022, 12:00 GMT (14:00 local time, UTC+2), at the CAF headquarters in Cairo, Egypt. The 16 winners of the second round of qualifying were drawn into four groups of four.

The teams were seeded by their performances in the CAF competitions for the previous five seasons (CAF 5-year ranking points shown next to every team). Each group contained one team from each of Pot 1, Pot 2, Pot 3, and Pot 4, and each team was allocated to the positions in their group according to their pot.

Pot 1
| Team | Pts |
|---|---|
| (Egypt) Al Ahly | 78 |
| (Morocco) Wydad AC | 71 |
| (Tunisia) Espérance de Tunis | 58 |
| (Morocco) Raja CA | 54 |

Pot 2
| Team | Pts |
|---|---|
| (South Africa) Mamelodi Sundowns | 46 |
| (Egypt) Zamalek | 43 |
| (Angola) Petro de Luanda | 31 |
| (Guinea) Horoya | 31 |

Pot 3
| Team | Pts |
|---|---|
| (Tanzania) Simba | 28 |
| (Algeria) CR Belouizdad | 27 |
| (Algeria) JS Kabylie | 22 |
| (Sudan) Al Hilal | 19.5 |

Pot 4
| Team | Pts |
|---|---|
| (Democratic Republic of the Congo) AS Vita Club | 17 |
| (Cameroon) Coton Sport | 14.5 |
| (Sudan) Al Merrikh | 9 |
| (Uganda) Vipers | — |

In the group stage, each group was played on a home-and-away round-robin basis. The winners and runners-up of each group advanced to the quarter-finals of the knockout stage.

Tiebreakers
The teams were ranked according to points (3 points for a win, 1 point for a draw, 0 points for a loss). If tied on points, tiebreakers were applied in the following order (Regulations III. 20 & 21):
1. Points in head-to-head matches among tied teams;
2. Goal difference in head-to-head matches among tied teams;
3. Goals scored in head-to-head matches among tied teams;
4. Away goals scored in head-to-head matches among tied teams;
5. If more than two teams were tied, and after applying all head-to-head criteria above, a subset of teams were still tied, all head-to-head criteria above were reapplied exclusively to this subset of teams;
6. Goal difference in all group matches;
7. Goals scored in all group matches;
8. Away goals scored in all group matches;
9. Drawing of lots.

=== Group A ===
| Pos | Team | Pld | W | D | L | GF | GA | GD | Pts | Qualification | WAC | JSK | APL | ASV |
|---|---|---|---|---|---|---|---|---|---|---|---|---|---|---|
| 1 | (Morocco) Wydad AC | 6 | 4 | 1 | 1 | 7 | 1 | +6 | 13 | Advance to knockout stage | — | 3–0 | 1–0 | 1–0 |
| 2 | (Algeria) JS Kabylie | 6 | 3 | 1 | 2 | 4 | 5 | −1 | 10 | Advance to knockout stage | 1–0 | — | 1–0 | 2–1 |
| 3 | (Angola) Petro de Luanda | 6 | 2 | 1 | 3 | 3 | 5 | −2 | 7 | | 0–2 | 0–0 | — | 1–0 |
| 4 | (Democratic Republic of the Congo) AS Vita Club | 6 | 1 | 1 | 4 | 3 | 6 | −3 | 4 | | 0–0 | 1–0 | 1–2 | — |

Source: CAF

=== Group B ===
| Pos | Team | Pld | W | D | L | GF | GA | GD | Pts | Qualification | MDS | ASC | HIL | CSG |
|---|---|---|---|---|---|---|---|---|---|---|---|---|---|---|
| 1 | (South Africa) Mamelodi Sundowns | 6 | 4 | 2 | 0 | 14 | 7 | +7 | 14 | Advance to knockout stage | — | 5–2 | 1–0 | 2–1 |
| 2 | (Egypt) Al Ahly | 6 | 3 | 1 | 2 | 14 | 8 | +6 | 10 (Note: Head-to-head points: Al Ahly 3, Al Hilal 3. Head-to-head goal difference: Al Ahly +2, Al Hilal -2) | Advance to knockout stage | 2–2 | — | 3–0 | 3–0 |
| 3 | (Sudan) Al Hilal | 6 | 3 | 1 | 2 | 6 | 6 | 0 | 10 | | 1–1 | 1–0 | — | 2–0 |
| 4 | (Cameroon) Coton Sport | 6 | 0 | 0 | 6 | 3 | 16 | −13 | 0 | | 1–3 | 0–4 | 1–2 | — |

Source: CAF

=== Group C ===
| Pos | Team | Pld | W | D | L | GF | GA | GD | Pts | Qualification | RCA | SSC | HAC | VSC |
|---|---|---|---|---|---|---|---|---|---|---|---|---|---|---|
| 1 | (Morocco) Raja CA | 6 | 5 | 1 | 0 | 17 | 3 | +14 | 16 | Advance to knockout stage | — | 3–1 | 2–0 | 5–0 |
| 2 | (Tanzania) Simba | 6 | 3 | 0 | 3 | 10 | 7 | +3 | 9 | Advance to knockout stage | 0–3 | — | 7–0 | 1–0 |
| 3 | (Guinea) Horoya | 6 | 2 | 1 | 3 | 4 | 12 | −8 | 7 | | 1–3 | 1–0 | — | 2–0 |
| 4 | (Uganda) Vipers | 6 | 0 | 2 | 4 | 1 | 10 | −9 | 2 | | 1–1 | 0–1 | 0–0 | — |

Source: CAF

=== Group D ===
| Pos | Team | Pld | W | D | L | GF | GA | GD | Pts | Qualification | EST | CRB | ZSC | MSC |
|---|---|---|---|---|---|---|---|---|---|---|---|---|---|---|
| 1 | (Tunisia) Espérance de Tunis | 6 | 3 | 2 | 1 | 6 | 4 | +2 | 11 | Advance to knockout stage | — | 0–0 | 2–0 | 1–0 |
| 2 | (Algeria) CR Belouizdad | 6 | 3 | 1 | 2 | 4 | 2 | +2 | 10 | Advance to knockout stage | 0–1 | — | 2–0 | 1–0 |
| 3 | (Egypt) Zamalek | 6 | 2 | 1 | 3 | 7 | 9 | −2 | 7 | | 3–1 | 0–1 | — | 4–3 |
| 4 | (Sudan) Al Merrikh | 6 | 1 | 2 | 3 | 5 | 7 | −2 | 5 | | 1–1 | 1–0 | 0–0 | — |

Source: CAF

== Knockout stage ==
The mechanism of the draws for each round was as follows:

- In the draw for the quarter-finals, the four group winners were seeded, and the four group runners-up were unseeded. The seeded teams were drawn against the unseeded teams, with the seeded teams hosting the second leg. Teams from the same group cannot be drawn against each other, while teams from the same association can be drawn against each other.
- In the draws for the semi-finals and final, there were no seedings, and teams from the same group or the same association could be drawn against each other. As the draws for the quarter-finals and semi-finals were held together before the quarter-finals were played, the identity of the quarter-final winners was not known at the time of the semi-final draw.

| Group | Winners | Runners-up |
|---|---|---|
| A | (Royal Moroccan Football Federation) Wydad AC | (Algerian Football Federation) JS Kabylie |
| B | (South African Football Association) Mamelodi Sundowns | (Egyptian Football Association) Al Ahly |
| C | (Royal Moroccan Football Federation) Raja CA | (Tanzania Football Federation) Simba |
| D | (Tunisian Football Federation) Espérance de Tunis | (Algerian Football Federation) CR Belouizdad |

=== Bracket ===
The bracket was decided after the draw for the knockout stage, which was held on 5 April 2023.

Quarter-finals
(Algerian Football Federation) JS Kabylie | 0 | 1 | 1
(Tunisian Football Federation) Espérance de Tunis | 1 | 1 | 2
(Egyptian Football Association) Al Ahly | 2 | 0 | 2
(Royal Moroccan Football Federation) Raja CA | 0 | 0 | 0
(Tanzania Football Federation) Simba | 1 | 0 | 1 (3)
(Royal Moroccan Football Federation) Wydad AC (p) | 0 | 1 | 1 (4)
(Algerian Football Federation) CR Belouizdad | 1 | 1 | 2
(South African Football Association) Mamelodi Sundowns | 4 | 2 | 6

Semi-finals
(Tunisian Football Federation) Espérance de Tunis | 0 | 0 | 0
(Egyptian Football Association) Al Ahly | 3 | 1 | 4
(Royal Moroccan Football Federation) Wydad AC (a) | 0 | 2 | 2
(South African Football Association) Mamelodi Sundowns | 0 | 2 | 2

Final
(Egyptian Football Association) Al Ahly | 2 | 1 | 3
(Royal Moroccan Football Federation) Wydad AC | 1 | 1 | 2

=== Quarter-finals ===
| Team 1 | Agg. | Team 2 | 1st leg | 2nd leg |
|---|---|---|---|---|
| Simba (Tanzania) | 1–1 (3–4 p) | (Morocco) Wydad AC | 1–0 | 0–1 |
| Al Ahly (Egypt) | 2–0 | (Morocco) Raja CA | 2–0 | 0–0 |
| CR Belouizdad (Algeria) | 2–6 | (South Africa) Mamelodi Sundowns | 1–4 | 1–2 |
| JS Kabylie (Algeria) | 1–2 | (Tunisia) Espérance de Tunis | 0–1 | 1–1 |

=== Semi-finals ===
| Team 1 | Agg. | Team 2 | 1st leg | 2nd leg |
|---|---|---|---|---|
| Espérance de Tunis (Tunisia) | 0–4 | (Egypt) Al Ahly | 0–3 | 0–1 |
| Wydad AC (Morocco) | 2–2 (a) | (South Africa) Mamelodi Sundowns | 0–0 | 2–2 |

=== Final ===
The first leg was played on 4 June, and the second leg was played on 11 June 2023.

| Team 1 | Agg. | Team 2 | 1st leg | 2nd leg |
|---|---|---|---|---|
| Al Ahly (Egypt) | 3–2 | (Morocco) Wydad AC | 2–1 | 1–1 |

4 June 2023
21:00 UTC+3

| Al Ahly (Egypt) | 2–1 | (Morocco) Wydad AC |
|---|---|---|
| Tau 45+4'; Kahraba 59' | Report | Bouhra 86' |

Cairo International Stadium, Cairo
Attendance: 50,000
Referee: Mutaz Ibrahim (Libya)
11 June 2023
20:00 UTC+1

| Wydad AC (Morocco) | 1–1 | (Egypt) Al Ahly |
|---|---|---|
| Attiyat Allah 27' | Report | Abdelmonem 78' |

Stade Mohammed V, Casablanca
Attendance: 45,000
Referee: Bamlak Tessema Weyesa (Ethiopia)

Al Ahly won 3–2 on aggregate.

== Top goalscorers ==
Team eliminated / inactive for this round.

| Rank | Player | Team | MD1 | MD2 | MD3 | MD4 | MD5 | MD6 | QF1 | QF2 | SF1 | SF2 | F1 | F2 | Total |
|---|---|---|---|---|---|---|---|---|---|---|---|---|---|---|---|
| 1 | (Namibia) Peter Shalulile | (South Africa) Mamelodi Sundowns | | | 1 | 2 | | | 2 | | | 1 | | | 6 |
| 1 | (Egypt) Mahmoud Kahraba | (Egypt) Al Ahly | | | | | 3 | 1 | | | 1 | | 1 | | 6 |
| 3 | (Morocco) Hamza Khabba | (Morocco) Raja CA | 1 | 1 | 1 | | | 2 | | | | | | | 5 |
| 3 | (South Africa) Percy Tau | (Egypt) Al Ahly | | | | 1 | 1 | | | | 2 | | 1 | | 5 |
| 5 | (Democratic Republic of the Congo) Makabi Lilepo | (Sudan) Al Hilal | | 1 | 2 | 1 | | | | | | | | | 4 |
| 5 | (Zambia) Clatous Chama | (Tanzania) Simba | | | | 1 | 3 | | | | | | | | 4 |
| 5 | (Democratic Republic of the Congo) Jean Othos | (Tanzania) Simba | | | | | 2 | 1 | 1 | | | | | | 4 |
| 5 | (South Africa) Cassius Mailula | (South Africa) Mamelodi Sundowns | 1 | 2 | | | | | 1 | | | | | | 4 |
| 5 | (Senegal) Bouly Sambou | (Morocco) Wydad AC | | | | 1 | | 2 | | 1 | | | | | 4 |
| 5 | (Egypt) Hussein El Shahat | (Egypt) Al Ahly | | | 1 | | | 2 | | | | 1 | | | 4 |

== See also ==
- 2022–23 CAF Confederation Cup
- 2023 CAF Super Cup
