= Samuel Ofori (footballer, born 1996) =

Ghanaian footballer (born 1996)

Personal information
- Date of birth: 23 January 1996 (age 30)
- Position: Forward

Senior career*
Years	Team	Apps	(Gls)
2017	Berekum Chelsea	2	(0)
2017–2020	Medeama	2	(0)
2020–2021	Karela United	11	(2)
2021–2022	Nsoatreman	23	(15)
2022–2023	Al-Safa		
2023–2024	Al-Jalil		
2024–2025	Al-Noor		
- * Club domestic league appearances and goals as of 15:41, 21 August 2022 (UTC)

Samuel Ofori (born 23 January 1996) is a Ghanaian professional footballer who plays as a forward.

== Career ==
Ofori previously played for Berekum Chelsea and Medeama SC. In January 2021, he was sent on a season-long loan deal to Western Region-based club Karela United. He played 5 league matches and scored 1 goal in the 2019–20 Ghana Premier League season before the league was put on hold and later cancelled due to the COVID-19 pandemic. He featured for Karela during the first round of the 2020–21 Ghana Premier League. On 15 November 2020, he scored a goal in a 2–2 draw against Ashanti Gold with Diawisie Taylor scoring the other goal.

Ofori joined Lebanese Premier League side Safa in August 2022.

== Honours ==
Safa

- Lebanese Challenge Cup runner-up: 2022
