= Sadiq Alhassan =

Ghanaian footballer

Personal information
- Full name: Sadiq Alhassan
- Date of birth: 15 August 1996 (age 30)
- Position: Midfielder

Team information
- Current team: Dreams
- Number: 5

Senior career*
Years	Team	Apps	(Gls)
2015–2018	Wa All-Stars	50	(3)
2018–	Karela United	48	(1)
2023–	Dreams	10	(0)
- * Club domestic league appearances and goals

Sadiq Alhassan (born 15 August 1996) is a Ghanaian professional footballer who currently plays as a midfielder for Ghana Premier League side Karela United FC, whom he serves as the deputy captain.

== Career ==
Alhassan started his career with then Wa All Stars FC now Legon Cities FC in 2015. He played for the club for 3 seasons till he signed for fellow Ghana Premier League side Karela United FC. He was made a deputy captain of the side along with Diawisie Taylor to club captain Godfred Agyemang Yeboah ahead of the 2020–21 Ghana Premier League season.

== Honours ==
Wa All Stars

- Ghana Premier League: 2015–16
- Ghana Super Cup: 2017

Dreams

- Ghana FA Cup: 2022–23
