= Godfred Agyemang Yeboah =

Ghanaian footballer

Personal information
- Full name: Godfred Agyemang Yeboah
- Date of birth: 24 June 1998 (age 28)
- Place of birth: Ghana
- Height: 1.72 m (5 ft 8 in)
- Position: Centre back

Team information
- Current team: Karela United FC

Youth career
- 2012–2014: Obonu
- 2014–2015: Shaka
- 2015: Golden Boys

Senior career*
Years	Team	Apps	(Gls)
2015–2017	Proud United		
2017–2021	Karela United	60	(0)
- * Club domestic league appearances and goals as of 00:31, 14 September 2020 (UTC)

Godfred Agyemang Yeboah (born 24 June 1998) is a Ghanaian footballer who plays as a centre back for Ghana Premier League side Karela United FC, whom he captains.

== Club career ==
=== Early career ===
Yeboah played at Obonu FC in 2012, Shaka FC in 2014 and Golden Boys FC 2015 during his formative period as a footballer.

=== Proud United ===
Yeboah began his professional football career with Proud United FC in the 2015–2016 season.

=== Karela United ===
In January 2017, Ghana Premier League side Karela United FC signed Yeboah on a three-year contract from Proud United FC.

In October 2019, It was reported that Ghana Premier League giants Hearts of Oak SC were interested in his services but a transfer request was rejected by Karela United FC based on financial agreements. He was promoted from deputy captain to captain ahead of the 2020–21 season with Diawisie Taylor and Sadiq Alhassan serving as his deputies.
