= Kwame Boateng =

Ghanaian professional footballer

Personal information
- Full name: Kwame Boateng
- Date of birth: 28 November 1992 (age 33)
- Place of birth: Accra, Ghana
- Height: 1.78 m (5 ft 10 in)
- Position: Striker

Team information
- Current team: Karela United

Senior career*
Years	Team	Apps	(Gls)
2010–2011	Asante Kotoko		
2011–2012	Metalac Gornji Milanovac	10	(0)
2015	Accra Great Olympics		
2016	New Edubiase United	2	(0)
2018–2019	Medeama	24	(8)
2020–	Karela United	38	(8)

International career
2015	Ghana	2	(0)
- * Club domestic league appearances and goals

Kwame Boateng (born 28 November 1992) is a Ghanaian professional footballer who played as a striker for Karela United.

== Club career ==
Boateng was part of Asante Kotoko coached by a Serbian manager Bogdan Korak. During the summer of 2011, the club went on a tour to Serbia to play a series of friendlies and to try to impress clubs and scouts in Europe. Boateng and Owusu-Ansah Kontor stayed in Serbia and joined Metalac Gornji Milanovac of the Serbian SuperLiga. He made his league debut on September 10, 2011, in a round 4 match against Javor Ivanjica.

== International career ==
On 25 May 2015, Boateng made his debut for the Ghana national football team in a friendly game against Madagascar.
