= Enoch Morrison =

Ghanaian footballer (born 2000)

Enoch Morrison (18 January 2000) is a Ghanaian professional footballer who turns out for Sudan Premier League side Al Merrikh SC as a central midfielder.

Morrison previously turned for Ghana Premier League side Asante Kotoko in the 2023–24 season building his case to join Gor Mahia in July 2024 on a two-year contract.

At the end of the 2025–26 season, Morrison was named both the Player of the Season and Best Midfielder during a gala night held in Nairobi on 4 June 2026 following Gor Mahia's successful league campaign which saw them reclaim the Kenyan league title, a record 22nd in their history. Soon after he moved to join Sudanese giants Al Merrikh SC on a three-year deal.
