= Yaw Ansah Fufuro =

Ghanaian professional footballer

Personal information
- Date of birth: June 28, 1993 (age 33)
- Place of birth: Ghana
- Position: Goalkeeper

Team information
- Current team: Karela United

Senior career*
Years	Team	Apps	(Gls)
- Medeama SC
2013-2020	Karela United		
- * Club domestic league appearances and goals

Yaw Ansah Fufuro (born 28 June 1993) is a Ghanaian professional footballer who plays as a goalkeeper for Ghanaian Premier League side Karela United. He previously played for Medeama SC for 7 years from 2013 to 2020.

== Career ==
=== Medeama SC ===
Ansah previously played for lower-tier side Westland FC before moving to Medeama SC in 2013. In 2013, he signed a 4-year contract with Ghana Premier League side Medeama SC. from 2013 to 2020. He mostly played as the second goalkeeper to Eric Ofori Antwi between 2017 and 2020. At the start of the 2017 Ghana Premier League season, he started as second fiddle to new signee Eric Ofori Antwi, before dislodging him and featuring in 18 league for Medeama, which later became his highest number of league appearances from 2017 to 2020. In June 2017 within the season, he signed a new 3-year contract to expire in 2020. In the 2019–20 Ghana Premier League season he played continued to play second fiddle to Antwi, featuring in just 1 league match before the league was put on hold and later cancelled due to the COVID-19 pandemic.

=== Karela United ===
Ahead of the 2020–21 Ghana Premier League season, In October 2020, Ansah joined Western Region-based club Karela United. He was named on the club's squad list for the season.
