= Roy Mbongui =

Gabonese footballer (born 2005)

Personal information
- Full name: Roy Chrichilin Mouniengue Mbongui
- Date of birth: 1 December 2005 (age 20)
- Place of birth: Libreville, Gabon
- Height: 1.76 m (5 ft 9 in)
- Position: Midfielder

Team information
- Current team: Al Wasl
- Number: 26

Youth career
- Nguen Asuku
- 2024–2025: Al Wasl

Senior career*
Years	Team	Apps	(Gls)
2019–2021	Nguen Asuku	29	(8)
2021–2022	Bouenguidi Sport	23	(0)
2022–2024	Stade Mandji	25	(6)
2025–	Al Wasl	0	(0)

International career^{‡}
2022	Gabon U23	5	(3)
2022	Gabon	1	(0)
- * Club domestic league appearances and goals as of 28 August 2024 ‡ National team caps and goals as of 23 November 2022

Roy Chrichilin Mouniengue Mbongui (born 1 December 2005) commonly known as Roy Mouniengue Mbongui is a Gabonese professional footballer who plays as a Midfielder for Al Wasl Youth and the Gabon national team.

== Club career ==
=== Early career ===
Born in Libreville, Gabon. Mbongui first played football at Nguen Asuku FC.

=== Senior career ===
On 1 July 2021 he signed for Gabon club Bouenguidi Sport.

On 1 July 2022, Mbongui signed with Stade Mandji on a free transfer.

In February 2024, Mbongui joined UAE Pro League side Al Wasl on a two-year permanent deal, being initially assigned to Al Wasl Youth setup for development purposes.

== International career ==
He was part of the Gabon U23s at the 2023 U-23 Africa Cup of Nations.

He debuted with the senior Gabon national team in a 3–1 FIFA International friendly win over Niger national football team on 20 November 2022.
