= Umar Bashiru =

Ghanaian footballer

Umar Basiru
Personal information
- Full name: Umar Basiru
- Date of birth: 10 July 1997 (age 29)
- Position: Midfielder

Senior career*
Years	Team	Apps	(Gls)
2015–2018	WAFA		
2018–2019	Asante Kotoko		
2020–	Karela United		
2022/2023	Ethiopian Medhin		
2023/2024	Ethiopian Nigd Bank	30	

International career
- Black Galaxies
- * Club domestic league appearances and goals

Umar Bashiru (born 10 July 1997) is a Ghanaian professional footballer who currently plays as a midfielder,

== Career ==
Bashiru started his professional career with for West African Football Academy (WAFA) in 2015. He went on to play for them and serve as club captain till he moved to Kumasi-based club Asante Kotoko SC. He played for the club for 2 seasons till he moved to Karela United as a free agent ahead of the 2020–21 season after terminating his contract with Asante Kotoko before the commencement of the 2019–20 season.
