= Mamudu Kamaradin =

Ghanaian footballer

Mamudu Kamaradin is a Ghanaian professional footballer who plays as a defender for Ghana Premier League side Medeama.

== Club career ==
Kamaradin moved to Ashanti Gold S.C. in 2020. He was signed by Karela United on a year long loan deal for the 2020–21 Ghana Premier League season.

== International career ==
In August 2020, Kamaradin received a call up into the Black Satellites the Ghana national under-20 football team for the team's camping ahead of the WAFU U-20 qualifiers.
