= Taahir Goedeman =

South African soccer player

Personal information
- Date of birth: 5 December 1999 (age 26)
- Position: Midfielder

Team information
- Current team: Durban City (on loan from Cape Town City)
- Number: 27

Youth career
- –2020: Cape Town City

Senior career*
Years	Team	Apps	(Gls)
2020–	Cape Town City	74	(3)
2025–	→ Durban City (loan)	5	(0)
- * Club domestic league appearances and goals as of 4 January 2026

Taahir Goedeman (born 5 December 1999) is a South African soccer player who plays as a midfielder for Durban City, on loan from Cape Town City in the South African Premier Division.

Goedeman played Diski Challenge Shield soccer for Cape Town City, until reaching the first team during the 2019-20 South African Premier Division and making his senior debut in 2021. Early on, Goedeman played against Mamelodi Sundowns, coming close to score in a 0–0 draw. The next season, he was noticed for starting against Kaizer Chiefs in August, which ended in a 2–0 victory.

By the 2023-24 season, he was described as a "key player" for Cape Town City, and the club managed to secure a four-year contract extension with Goedeman in 2024.
