= Solomon Safo-Taylor =

Ghanaian footballer (born 1998)

Personal information
- Full name: Solomon Safo-Taylor
- Date of birth: 19 June 1998 (age 28)
- Place of birth: Kumasi, Ghana
- Position: Forward

Senior career*
Years	Team	Apps	(Gls)
2018–2019	Karela United	16	(5)
2019–2020	Vendsyssel FF	5	(0)
2021–2023	Asante Kotoko	31	(4)

International career
2019	Ghana U23		
- * Club domestic league appearances and goals as of 4 September 2026

Solomon Safo-Taylor (born 19 June 1998) is a Ghanaian professional footballer who plays as a forward. He has previously played for Karela United, Danish club Vendsyssel FF and Asante Kotoko.

Safo-Taylor began his senior career with Karela United and was part of the side that reached the final of the 2019 Ghana Football Association Normalization Committee Special Competition. He moved to Denmark to join Vendsyssel in 2019 before returning to Ghana and signing for Asante Kotoko in 2021. He was part of the Kotoko squad that won the 2021–22 Ghana Premier League.

== Club career ==
=== Karela United ===
Safo-Taylor began his senior career with Karela United. In January 2018, he featured for the club in the GHALCA G8 tournament, making three appearances and scoring three goals. All three goals came in a 4–0 victory over Ebusua Dwarfs, with Safo-Taylor completing his hat-trick in the first half.

He subsequently played a prominent role for Karela during the 2019 Ghana Football Association Normalization Committee Special Competition. Safo-Taylor made 16 appearances and scored five goals as Karela finished second in their group and progressed to the Tier I final. His goals included the winner in a 1–0 victory over Hearts of Oak on 7 April 2019.

Karela eventually finished as runners-up in the Tier I competition after losing the final to Asante Kotoko. Safo-Taylor formed part of Karela's attack alongside Diawisie Taylor, who finished as the competition's joint top scorer.

=== Vendsyssel FF ===
On 7 August 2019, Safo-Taylor moved abroad for the first time in his career, joining Danish 1st Division club Vendsyssel FF from Karela United on a four-year contract.

Safo-Taylor made five league appearances for Vendsyssel during the 2019–20 season. He scored his only goal for the club in the Danish Cup, finding the net in a 9–0 victory over Kjellerup IF.

His time in Denmark was short-lived, and he subsequently left Vendsyssel after his contract was terminated by mutual consent.

=== Asante Kotoko ===
On 15 March 2021, Safo-Taylor joined Asante Kotoko on a three-and-a-half-year contract after leaving Vendsyssel FF. He was signed during the mid-season transfer window following the departure of striker Kwame Opoku to Algerian club USM Alger.

Safo-Taylor made his competitive debut for Kotoko on 13 May 2021, coming on as a substitute in a 2–1 league victory over Ebusua Dwarfs. He scored his first goal for the club on 11 July, finding the equaliser in an eventual 2–1 defeat to Bechem United. He finished the 2020–21 Ghana Premier League season with six league appearances and one goal.

During the 2021–22 season, Safo-Taylor made 12 league appearances as Asante Kotoko won the Ghana Premier League title. He made a further 13 league appearances and scored three goals during the 2022–23 season.

== Registration dispute and suspension ==
In April 2024, the Ghana Football Association (GFA) Disciplinary Committee imposed a three-year ban on Safo-Taylor from participating in GFA-organised matches and competitions and revoked his player licence after finding him guilty of falsifying his registration documents. The case concerned allegations that Safo-Taylor had previously been registered with the GFA under the name Charles Oppong and had subsequently been registered as Solomon Safo-Taylor using different personal details.

The decision was subsequently upheld by the GFA Appeals Committee in May 2024. Safo-Taylor challenged the ruling at the Court of Arbitration for Sport (CAS), filing an appeal in November 2024. In December, CAS granted provisional measures suspending the effect of the ban and reinstating his player licence while the appeal was being determined.

On 29 April 2025, CAS issued its final award, partially upholding Safo-Taylor's appeal and setting aside the decision of the GFA Appeals Committee. CAS also ordered the GFA to pay CHF 4,000 towards his legal fees and other expenses.

== International career ==
In August 2019, Safo-Taylor was called up to the Ghana national under-23 football team by head coach Ibrahim Tanko ahead of the final qualifying round for the 2019 Africa U-23 Cup of Nations against Algeria.

== Honours ==
Asante Kotoko

- Ghana Premier League: 2021–22
