= Zalan FC =

South Sudanese team from Rumbek

- Full name: Zalan Football Club
- Founded: 1998; 27 years ago
- Ground: Rumbek Freedom Square
- League: South Sudan Premier League
Home colours

Zalan FC is a South Sudanese team from Rumbek. They compete in the South Sudan Premier League, finishing second in Group B in 2017. Zarlan lost to Young Africans of Tanzania in CAF Champions League(4–0) on 10th Sept 2022

== History ==
In 2017 Zalan FC lost the UNMISS Peace Cup 4–2 to Gonzaga FC. In 2018 Zalan FC won the South Sudan Premier League cup after beating Gold Star team 4–0.

== Current squad ==
Note: Flags indicate national team as defined under FIFA eligibility rules; some limited exceptions apply. Players may hold more than one non-FIFA nationality.

No.	Pos.	Nation	Player
—		(South Sudan) SSD	Justin Marial Mathok

== See more ==
- South Sudan
- South Sudan national football team
