= Diawisie Taylor =

Ghanaian footballer (born 2000)

Personal information
- Full name: Charles Diawisie Taylor
- Date of birth: 1 January 2000 (age 26)
- Place of birth: Dormaa Ahenkro, Bono Region
- Position: Striker

Team information
- Current team: Al-Merrikh (on loan from Future)
- Number: 10

Senior career*
Years	Team	Apps	(Gls)
2015–2016	Bibiani Gold Stars	39	(41)
2018–2021	Karela United	79	(34)
2021–2022	Future	0	(0)
2022	→ Al-Merrikh (loan)	0	(0)
- * Club domestic league appearances and goals

Charles Diawisie Taylor (born 1 January 2000, in Dormaa Ahenkro) is a Ghanaian professional footballer who currently plays as a striker for Sudanese club Al-Merrikh on loan from Egyptian Premier League club Future FC. He previously played for Bibiani Gold Stars.

== Career ==
=== Karela United ===
Taylor joined Karela United in January 2017. In his debut season, the 2016–17 Ghana Division One season, he had a slow start after playing 7 matches for the Nzema-based outfit without scoring. Taylor scored his debut goal in a 2–1 away win against Bekwai Youth Football Academy, before picking a knee injury a week later in the MTN FA Cup round of 64 match against Samraboi-based Samartex. He returned from injury to play the latter part of the season featuring in the last 4 matches of the season as Karela United were crowned champions of the Ghana Division One League Zone II and qualify to the Premier League for the first time in the club's history.

He made his premier league debut for Karela in the Ghana Premier League on 17 March 2018, in a 1–0 home defeat to title favourites Medeama, he started and played the full game. On 1 April 2018, Taylor made history by scoring Karela's first ever Ghana Premier League goal via an assist from Donald Wellington, who also scored the third in a 3–0 win at home against Ebusua Dwarfs to grant Karela the club's first ever win in the Ghana Premier League after losing two and drawing one in their first three matches. Taylor's goal was scored in the 14th second after kick off making it the fastest goal in the Ghana Premier League history. In July 2018, the season was halted due to the suspension of the Ghana Football Association after the release of the Anas Number 12 expose. He ended the season with 7 appearances and a goal. On the opening week of the 2019 GFA Normalization Competition, Taylor scored the second goal in Karela's 2–1 victory over Ebusua Dwarfs. He went on to score a brace in three consecutive matches against Liberty Professionals, West African Football Academy and International Allies. Karela placed second in Group B behind Hearts of Oak and qualified to the Championship playoff. In the semi-final play-off on 19 June 2019, Taylor scored the winning goal connecting a pass from Solomon Sarfo Taylor in the fourth minute of second-half stoppage time to give Karela a 1–0 victory over Ashanti Gold at the Len Clay Stadium. On 23 June, he played in the championship final, where Karela lost 4–1 on penalties against Asante Kotoko after the match ended 1–1.

Taylor scored a brace in the 2020–21 Ghana Premier League match against Berekum Chelsea on 17 January 2021.

=== Future ===
In October 2021, Taylor joined Egyptian club Future FC on a three-year deal for an undisclosed fee.

== Honours ==
Karela United

- Ghana Division One League Zone II: 2017

Individual

- Ghana Division One League Top Scorer: 2016
- GFA Special Competition Top Scorer: 2019
- Ghana Premier League Top Scorer: 2020–21
- Ghana Premier League Player of the Month: January 2021
