= Josip Ravignia =

Seychelles footballer

Personal information
- Full name: Josip Henry Ravignia
- Date of birth: 19 February 2001 (age 25)
- Place of birth: Seychelles
- Position: Forward

Team information
- Current team: St Michel United
- Number: 10

Senior career*
Years	Team	Apps	(Gls)
2017–2022	Real Maldive		
2022–	St Michel United		

International career^{‡}
2019–	Seychelles	15	(0)
- * Club domestic league appearances and goals ‡ National team caps and goals as of 13:50, 6 July 2023 (UTC)

Josip Ravignia (born 19 February 2001) is a Seychellois footballer who plays as a forward for St Michel United and the Seychelles national team.

== Club career ==
Ravignia played for his school team while a student at English River Secondary School. In 2015 he was the top scorer of both the under-15 and under-17 divisions and named the top player of both age groups. He spent his early club career with Real Maldive. In 2017 he helped the club finish near the top of the second division. In 2018 the club competed in the nation's second division again. In August of that year, he scored two goals against Victoria City. The match eventually ended in a 2–3 defeat for Real Maldive, resulting in Victoria City overtaking the club as league leaders.

Real Maldive were crowned champions of the second division in 2020. Ravignia scored the 94th-minute equalizing goal against St. John Bosco FC on the final matchday. With the draw, the club passed St. John Bosco in the standings and won the title. The club competed in the Seychelles Premier League the following season. He continued his scoring form in the top division, including against Northern Dynamo in December 2020 to earn the club's first win in the league.

By 2022 Ravignia had moved to fellow Premier League side St Michel United. The team qualified for the 2022–23 CAF Confederation Cup qualifying rounds and automatically advanced to the second round after Inter de Litoral Academy of Equatorial Guinea failed to appear for the first-round match. In the second round, St. Michel United was drawn against Motema Pembe. The Seychelles club earned a surprise 1–0 victory in the first leg with Ravignia scoring the only goal of the match from a header. Later in 2022, Ravignia then provided an assist in the final of the Seychelles President's Cup as St. Michel defeated La Passe 2–1 to earn a record fourteenth title.

== International career ==
As a youth, Ravignia respresented the Seychelles at the 2019 COSAFA U-20 Cup. He made his senior international debut on 5 September 2019 in a 2022 FIFA World Cup qualification match against Rwanda. The next year he participated in the 2020 Bangabandhu Cup. He nearly scored against Mauritius as Seychelles earned a 2–2 draw to advance to the knockout stage. In 2021 Ravignia was a key contributor as the Seychelles won the Mahinda Rajapaksa Trophy, considered a major accomplishment in Seychelles sporting history. The tournament also featured Sri Lanka, Bangladesh, and the Maldives. In 2022 he was included in the Seychelles squad for the 2022 COSAFA Cup. Later that year, Ravignia was part of the squad that traveled to Europe to play the nation's first match against a European opponent, San Marino. The match ended in a scoreless draw with Ravignia being mentioned as one of the team's bright spots by Brazilian media. He was called up again for the 2023 COSAFA Cup.

=== International career statistics ===
As of match played 25 March 2023

Seychelles national team
Year	Apps	Goals
2019	1	0
2020	0	0
2021	4	0
2022	9	0
2023	1	0
Total	15	0

== Personal ==
Ravignia's father, Georges Ravingia, is considered to be one of the best Seychelles footballers of his generation.
