= Monde Mphambaniso =

South African soccer player

Personal information
- Date of birth: 2 October 1992 (age 34)
- Place of birth: Johannesburg, South Africa
- Height: 1.60 m (5 ft 3 in)
- Position: Midfielder

Team information
- Current team: Marumo Gallants
- Number: 10

Senior career*
Years	Team	Apps	(Gls)
–2016	Yebo Yes United		
2016–2017	Acornbush United		
2017–2018	TTM	27	(4)
2018–2020	Polokwane City	11	(1)
2020–2021	TTM	10	(0)
2021–	Marumo Gallants	77	(5)

International career^{‡}
2022	South Africa	1	(0)
- * Club domestic league appearances and goals as of 6 August 2025 ‡ National team caps and goals as of 6 August 2025

Monde Mphambaniso (born 2 October 1992) is a South African soccer player who plays as a midfielder for Marumo Gallants in the Premier Soccer League.

He was born in Johannesburg. After spending his early senior career with Second Division sides Yebo Yes United and Acornbush United, he moved to First Division side Tshakhuma Tsha Madzivhandila in 2017 and Polokwane City in 2018. He made his first-tier debut in the 2018-19 South African Premier Division.

In 2020 he returned to Tshakhuma Tsha Madzivhandila. After winning the 2020–21 Nedbank Cup, the team changed its name to the Marumo Gallants, where Mphambaniso continued.

Mphambaniso took part in Marumo Gallants' run in the CAF Confederation Cup, scoring against Elgeco Plus in the 2022–23 CAF Confederation Cup qualifying rounds. He was called up for South Africa for the 2022 African Nations Championship qualification, where he made his international debut against Angola.

In the 2024–25 South African Premiership, the league found Marumo Gallants guilty of "improperly registering" Mphambaniso. The registration regarded Marumo Gallants' selling and purchase of league licenses in 2024. Following an investigation, Marumo Gallants were fined 200,000 rand.

Mphambaniso is nicknamed "Popeye".
