= 2022–23 CAF Confederation Cup qualifying rounds =

International football competition in Africa

- Dates: 9 September – 9 November 2022

Tournament statistics
- Matches played: 96
- Goals scored: 185 (1.93 per match)

Qualification for the 2022–23 CAF Confederation Cup began on 9 September and ended on 9 November 2022 with a total of 50 teams that competed for the 16 International football group stage places of the 2022–23 CAF Confederation Cup.

Times were local.

== Draw ==
The draw for the qualifying rounds was held on 9 August 2022 at the CAF headquarters in Cairo, Egypt.

The entry round of the 50 teams entered into the draw was determined by their performances in the CAF competitions for the previous five seasons (CAF 5-year ranking points shown in parentheses).

| Entry round | Second round (14 teams) | First round (36 teams) |
|---|---|---|
| Teams | (Morocco) RS Berkane (54 pts); (Egypt) Pyramids (34 pts); (Tunisia) Club Sfaxien (19 pts); (Algeria) JS Saoura (9 pts); (Libya) Al Nasr (6 pts); (Zambia) ZESCO United (6 pts); (Algeria) USM Alger (5 pts); (Angola) Sagrada Esperança (5 pts); (Tunisia) Club Africain (4 pts); (Democratic Republic of the Congo) Motema Pembe (3 pts); (Republic of the Congo) Diables Noirs; (Ghana) Hearts of Oak; (South Africa) Marumo Gallants; (Tanzania) Azam | (Benin) Buffles du Borgou; (Botswana) Security Systems; (Burkina Faso) Douanes de Ouagadougou; (Burundi) Bumamuru; (Cameroon) PWD Bamenda; (Chad) AS Santé d'Abéché; (Democratic Republic of the Congo) Saint-Éloi Lupopo; (Djibouti) ASAS Télécom; (Egypt) Future; (Equatorial Guinea) Inter de Litoral Academy; (Eswatini) Mbabane Highlanders; (Ethiopia) Fasil Kenema; (Guinea) Ashanti Golden Boys; (Guinea) Milo; (Ivory Coast) Gagnoa; (Liberia) LISCR; (Libya) Al Akhdar; (Madagascar) Elgeco Plus; (Mali) Real Bamako; (Mauritania) Nouakchott Kings; (Morocco) ASFAR; (Mozambique) Ferroviário da Beira; (Niger) Douanes de Niamey; (Nigeria) Kwara United; (Nigeria) Remo Stars; (Rwanda) Kigali; (Seychelles) St Michel United; (Sierra Leone) Kallon; (South Africa) Royal AM; (South Sudan) Al Hilal Wau; (Sudan) Al Ahli Khartoum; (Sudan) Hilal Alsahil; (Tanzania) Geita Gold; (Togo) ASC Kara; (Uganda) Bul; (Zanzibar) Kipanga |

== Format ==
In the qualifying rounds, each tie was played on a home-and-away two-legged basis. If the aggregate score was tied after the second leg, the away goals rule was applied. If the scores were still tied, extra time was not played, and a penalty shoot-out was used to determine the winner (Regulations III. 13 & 14).

== Schedule ==
The schedule of the competition was as follows.

Schedule for the 2022–23 CAF Champions League
| Round | Draw date | First leg | Second leg |
|---|---|---|---|
| First round | 9 August 2022 | 9–11 September 2022 | 16–18 September 2022 |
| Second round | 9 August 2022 | 7–9 October 2022 | 14–16 October 2022 |
| Playoff round | 18 October 2022 | 2 November 2022 | 9 November 2022 |

== Bracket ==
The bracket of the draw was announced by the CAF on 9 August 2022. The 16 winners of the second round advanced to the playoff round, where they were joined by the 16 losers of the Champions League second round.

| First round | | | | | Second round |
| 1 | (Nigeria) Kwara United | 3 | 0 | 3 |
| 4 | (Niger) Douanes de Niamey | 0 | 0 | 0 |
| 4 | (Niger) Douanes de Niamey | 0 | 0 | 0 | (Nigeria) Kwara United | 3 | 0 | 3 |
| | | | | | (Morocco) RS Berkane (a) | 1 | 2 | 3 |

| First round | | | | | Second round |
| 1 | (Liberia) LISCR | 0 | 1 | 1 |
| 4 | (Ivory Coast) Gagnoa | 0 | 3 | 3 |
| 4 | (Ivory Coast) Gagnoa | 0 | 3 | 3 | (Ivory Coast) Gagnoa | 1 | 0 | 1 |
| | | | | | (Algeria) JS Saoura | 0 | 0 | 0 |

| First round | | | | | Second round |
| 1 | (Guinea) Milo | 2 | 0 | 2 |
| 4 | (Togo) ASC Kara | 1 | 3 | 4 |
| 4 | (Togo) ASC Kara | 1 | 3 | 4 | (Togo) ASC Kara | 0 | 1 | 1 |
| | | | | | (Algeria) USM Alger | 2 | 2 | 4 |

| First round | | | | | Second round |
| 1 | (Burkina Faso) Douanes de Ouagadougou | 0 | 0 | 0 (1) |
| 4 | (Mali) Real Bamako (p) | 0 | 0 | 0 (3) |
| 4 | (Mali) Real Bamako (p) | 0 | 0 | 0 (3) | (Mali) Real Bamako | 3 | 0 | 3 |
| | | | | | (Ghana) Hearts of Oak | 0 | 1 | 1 |

| First round | | | | | Second round |
| 1 | (Sudan) Hilal Alsahil (a) | 1 | 1 | 2 |
| 4 | (Tanzania) Geita Gold | 0 | 2 | 2 |
| 4 | (Tanzania) Geita Gold | 0 | 2 | 2 | (Sudan) Hilal Alsahil | 0 | 0 | 0 |
| | | | | | (Egypt) Pyramids | 2 | 7 | 9 |

| First round | | | | | Second round |
| 1 | (Ethiopia) Fasil Kenema | 3 | 0 | 3 |
| 4 | (Burundi) Bumamuru | 0 | 1 | 1 |
| 4 | (Burundi) Bumamuru | 0 | 1 | 1 | (Ethiopia) Fasil Kenema | 0 | 0 | 0 |
| | | | | | (Tunisia) Club Sfaxien | 0 | 1 | 1 |

| First round | | | | | Second round |
| 1 | (Djibouti) ASAS Télécom | 0 | 0 | 0 |
| 4 | (Rwanda) Kigali | 0 | 1 | 1 |
| 4 | (Rwanda) Kigali | 0 | 1 | 1 | (Rwanda) Kigali | 0 | 0 | 0 |
| | | | | | (Libya) Al Nasr | 0 | 1o | 1 |

| First round | | | | | Second round |
| 1 | (South Sudan) Al Hilal Wau | 1 | 1 | 1 (3) |
| 4 | (Zanzibar) Kipanga (p) | 1 | 1 | 1 (4) |
| 4 | (Zanzibar) Kipanga (p) | 1 | 1 | 1 (4) | (Zanzibar) Kipanga | 0 | 0 | 0 |
| | | | | | (Tunisia) Club Africain | 0 | 7 | 7 |

| First round | | | | | Second round |
| 1 | (Libya) Al Akhdar | 3 | 0 | 3 |
| 4 | (Sudan) Al Ahli Khartoum | 0 | 0 | 0 |
| 4 | (Sudan) Al Ahli Khartoum | 0 | 0 | 0 | (Libya) Al Akhdar | 3 | 0 | 3 |
| | | | | | (Tanzania) Azam | 0 | 2 | 2 |

| First round | | | | | Second round |
| 1 | (Eswatini) Mbabane Highlanders | 0 | 0 | 0 |
| 4 | (South Africa) Royal AM | 0 | 2 | 2 |
| 4 | (South Africa) Royal AM | 0 | 2 | 2 | (South Africa) Royal AM (a) | 0 | 1 | 1 |
| | | | | | (Zambia) ZESCO United | 0 | 1 | 1 |

| First round | | | | | Second round |
| 1 | (Botswana) Security Systems | — | — |
| 4 | (Democratic Republic of the Congo) Saint-Éloi Lupopo | — | — | w/o |
| 4 | (Democratic Republic of the Congo) Saint-Éloi Lupopo | — | — | w/o | (Democratic Republic of the Congo) Saint-Éloi Lupopo | 2 | 0 | 2 |
| | | | | | (Angola) Sagrada Esperança | 0 | 0 | 0 |

| First round | | | | | Second round |
| 1 | (Seychelles) St Michel United | — | — | w/o |
| 4 | (Equatorial Guinea) Inter de Litoral Academy | — | — |
| 4 | (Equatorial Guinea) Inter de Litoral Academy | — | — | | (Seychelles) St Michel United | 1 | 0 | 1 |
| | | | | | (Democratic Republic of the Congo) Motema Pembe | 0 | 2 | 2 |

| First round | | | | | Second round |
| 1 | (Chad) AS Santé d'Abéché | 1 | 0 | 1 |
| 4 | (Mozambique) Ferroviário da Beira | 2 | 1 | 3 |
| 4 | (Mozambique) Ferroviário da Beira | 2 | 1 | 3 | (Mozambique) Ferroviário da Beira | 2 | 0 | 2 |
| | | | | | (Republic of the Congo) Diables Noirs | 1 | 3 | 4 |

| First round | | | | | Second round |
| 1 | (Cameroon) PWD Bamenda | 1 | 0 | 1 |
| 4 | (Madagascar) Elgeco Plus | 1 | 1 | 2 |
| 4 | (Madagascar) Elgeco Plus | 1 | 1 | 2 | (Madagascar) Elgeco Plus | 1 | 0 | 1 |
| | | | | | (South Africa) Marumo Gallants | 3 | 1 | 4 |

First round
1 | (Morocco) ASFAR | 1 | 1 | 2
4 | (Nigeria) Remo Stars | 1 | 0 | 1
3 | (Guinea) Ashanti Golden Boys | 2 | 0 | 2
2 | (Mauritania) Nouakchott Kings | 0 | 1 | 1

Second round
(Morocco) ASFAR | 4 | 1 | 5
(Guinea) Ashanti Golden Boys | 0 | 0 | 0

First round
1 | (Benin) Buffles du Borgou | 0 | 0 | 0
4 | (Sierra Leone) Kallon | 1 | 3 | 4
3 | (Uganda) Bul | 0 | 0 | 0
2 | (Egypt) Future | 0 | 1 | 1

Second round
(Sierra Leone) Kallon | 0 | 0 | 0
(Egypt) Future | 2 | 4 | 6

== First round ==
The first round, also called the first preliminary round, included the 36 teams that did not receive byes to the second round.

| Team 1 | Agg. | Team 2 | 1st leg | 2nd leg |
|---|---|---|---|---|
| Kwara United (Nigeria) | 3–0 | (Niger) Douanes de Niamey | 3–0 | 0–0 |
| LISCR (Liberia) | 1–3 | (Ivory Coast) Gagnoa | 0–0 | 1–3 |
| Milo (Guinea) | 2–4 | (Togo) ASC Kara | 2–1 | 0–3 |
| Douanes de Ouagadougou (Burkina Faso) | 0–0 (1–3 p) | (Mali) Real Bamako | 0–0 | 0–0 |
| Hilal Alsahil (Sudan) | 2–2 (a) | (Tanzania) Geita Gold | 1–0 | 1–2 |
| Fasil Kenema (Ethiopia) | 3–1 | (Burundi) Bumamuru | 3–0 | 0–1 |
| ASAS Télécom (Djibouti) | 0–1 | (Rwanda) Kigali | 0–0 | 0–1 |
| Al Hilal Wau (South Sudan) | 2–2 (3–4 p) | (Zanzibar) Kipanga | 1–1 | 1–1 |
| Al Akhdar (Libya) | 3–0 | (Sudan) Al Ahli Khartoum | 3–0 | 0–0 |
| Mbabane Highlanders (Eswatini) | 0–2 | (South Africa) Royal AM | 0–0 | 0–2 |
| Security Systems (Botswana) | w/o (Note: Saint-Éloi Lupopo won on a walkover after Security Systems withdrew from the competition citing financial reasons.) | (Democratic Republic of the Congo) Saint-Éloi Lupopo | — | — |
| St Michel United (Seychelles) | w/o (Note: St Michel United won on a walkover after Inter de Litoral Academy failed to appear for the first leg.) | (Equatorial Guinea) Inter de Litoral Academy | — | — |
| AS Santé d'Abéché (Chad) | 1–3 | (Mozambique) Ferroviário da Beira | 1–2 | 0–1 |
| PWD Bamenda (Cameroon) | 1–2 | (Madagascar) Elgeco Plus | 1–1 | 0–1 |
| ASFAR (Morocco) | 2–1 | (Nigeria) Remo Stars | 1–1 | 1–0 |
| Ashanti Golden Boys (Guinea) | 2–1 | (Mauritania) Nouakchott Kings | 2–0 | 0–1 |
| Buffles du Borgou (Benin) | 0–4 | (Sierra Leone) Kallon | 0–1 | 0–3 |
| Bul (Uganda) | 0–1 | (Egypt) Future | 0–0 | 0–1 |

Notes:

11 September 2022
16:00 UTC+1

| Kwara United (Nigeria) | 3–0 | (Niger) Douanes de Niamey |
|---|---|---|
| Samson 6'; Jimoh 18' (pen.), 40' | Report |

Onikan Stadium, Lagos
Referee: Tuoniféré Soro (Ivory Coast)
18 September 2022
16:15 UTC+1

| Douanes de Niamey (Niger) | 0–0 | (Nigeria) Kwara United |
|---|---|---|
| | Report |

Stade Général Seyni Kountché, Niamey
Referee: Adaari Abdul-Latif (Ghana)

Kwara United won 3–0 on aggregate.

11 September 2022
15:30 UTC+0

| LISCR (Liberia) | 0–0 | (Ivory Coast) Gagnoa |
|---|---|---|
| | Report |

SKD Stadium, Monrovia
Referee: Moussa Diou (Mauritania)
17 September 2022
16:00 UTC+0

| Gagnoa (Ivory Coast) | 3–1 | (Liberia) LISCR |
|---|---|---|
| Koffi 45', 51'; J-F N'Da 59' | Report | Sheriff 15' |

Stade de Yamoussoukro, Yamoussoukro
Referee: Daniel Luc Kassa (Benin)

Gagnoa won 3–1 on aggregate.

9 September 2022
16:00 UTC+0

| Milo (Guinea) | 2–1 | (Togo) ASC Kara |
|---|---|---|
| Ouro-Ayeva 2' (o.g.); Touré 41' | Report | Amekoudji 83' |

General Lansana Conté Stadium, Conakry
Referee: Gaoussou Kané (Mali)
18 September 2022
16:00 UTC+0

| ASC Kara (Togo) | 3–0 | (Guinea) Milo |
|---|---|---|
| Ougadja 35', 84'; Akoro 58' | Report |

Stade de Kégué, Lomé
Referee: Benoit Bado (Burkina Faso)

ASC Kara won 4–2 on aggregate.

13 September 2022
17:00 UTC+1

| Douanes de Ouagadougou (Burkina Faso) | 0–0 | (Mali) Real Bamako |
|---|---|---|
| | Report |

Stade de l'Amitié, Cotonou (Benin) (Note: Teams from Burkina Faso played their home matches outside the country, since none of the stadiums met the quality standards set according to the CAF regulations.)
Referee: Moussa Ahmadou Alou (Niger)
20 September 2022
16:00 UTC+0

| Real Bamako (Mali) | 0–0 | (Burkina Faso) Douanes de Ouagadougou |
|---|---|---|
| | Report |
Penalties
| S. Coulibaly (penalty scored); Bamba (penalty scored); Camara (penalty scored) | 3–1 | (penalty scored) Ibeh; (penalty missed) Kiendrebéogo; (penalty missed) Nikiéma; (penalty missed) Dah |

Stade du 26 Mars, Bamako
Referee: Moses Forkpah (Liberia)

0–0 on aggregate. Real Bamako won 3–1 on penalties.

11 September 2022
19:00 UTC+2

| Hilal Alsahil (Sudan) | 1–0 | (Tanzania) Geita Gold |
|---|---|---|
| Alshemali 16' | Report |

Al-Hilal Stadium, Omdurman
Referee: Saddam Mansour (Djibouti)
17 September 2022
19:00 UTC+3

| Geita Gold (Tanzania) | 2–1 | (Sudan) Hilal Alsahil |
|---|---|---|
| Lyanga 52'; Godfrey 59' | Report | Alageed 5' |

Chamazi Stadium, Dar es Salaam
Referee: Jean Claude Ishimwe (Rwanda)

2–2 on aggregate. Hilal Alsahil won on away goals.

9 September 2022
16:00 UTC+3

| Fasil Kenema (Ethiopia) | 3–0 | (Burundi) Bumamuru |
|---|---|---|
| Yigzaw 34'; Alemu 62'; Solomon 84' | Report |

Bahir Dar Stadium, Bahir Dar
Referee: Abdalaziz Estalgoo (Sudan)
16 September 2022
16:00 UTC+3

| Bumamuru (Burundi) | 1–0 | (Ethiopia) Fasil Kenema |
|---|---|---|
| Nahimana 23' | Report |

Chamazi Stadium, Dar es Salaam (Tanzania)
Referee: Chelanget Sabila (Uganda)

Fasil Kenema won 3–1 on aggregate.

10 September 2022
19:00 UTC+3

| ASAS Télécom (Djibouti) | 0–0 | (Rwanda) Kigali |
|---|---|---|
| | Report |

El Hadj Hassan Gouled Aptidon Stadium, Djibouti City
Referee: Ahmed Arajiga(Tanzania)
18 September 2022
15:00 UTC+2

| Kigali (Rwanda) | 1–0 | (Djibouti) ASAS Télécom |
|---|---|---|
| Kalisa 68' | Report |

Stade Huye, Butare
Referee: Haileyesus Bazezew (Ethiopia)

Kigali won 1–0 on aggregate.

11 September 2022
15:00 UTC+3

| Al Hilal Wau (South Sudan) | 1–1 | (Zanzibar) Kipanga |
|---|---|---|
| Peter 59' | Report | Vuai 5' |

National Stadium, Dar es Salaam (Tanzania) (Note: Teams from South Sudan played their home matches in Tanzania, since none of the stadiums met the quality standards set according to the CAF regulations.)
Referee: Ahmed Hassan Hussein (Somalia)
17 September 2022
16:15 UTC+3

| Kipanga (Zanzibar) | 1–1 | (South Sudan) Al Hilal Wau |
|---|---|---|
| Vuai 74' | Report | Abaker 25' |
Penalties
| Hassan (penalty missed); K. Ali (penalty scored); Kaboma (penalty missed); Ma. Ali (penalty scored); Francis (penalty scored); Vuai (penalty scored) | 4–3 | (penalty scored) Emilio; (penalty missed) Mohammed; (penalty scored) Anei; (penalty scored) Ali; (penalty missed) Peter; (penalty missed) Abdulkarim |

Amaan Stadium, Zanzibar City
Referee: Djaffari Nduwimana (Burundi)

2–2 on aggregate. Kipanga won 4–3 on penalties.

11 September 2022
19:00 UTC+2

| Al Akhdar (Libya) | 3–0 | (Sudan) Al Ahli Khartoum |
|---|---|---|
| Baleid 4'; Bessan 46'; Ali 78' | Report |

Benina Martyrs Stadium, Benghazi
Referee: Abderrazak Arab (Algeria)
16 September 2022
19:00 UTC+2

| Al Ahli Khartoum (Sudan) | 0–0 | (Libya) Al Akhdar |
|---|---|---|
| | Report |

Benina Martyrs Stadium, Benghazi (Libya)
Referee: Tsegay Mogos Teklu (Eritrea)

Al Akhdar won 3–0 on aggregate.

11 September 2022
15:00 UTC+2

| Mbabane Highlanders (Eswatini) | 0–0 | (South Africa) Royal AM |
|---|---|---|
| | Report |

Somhlolo National Stadium, Lobamba
Referee: Osiase Koto (Lesotho)
16 September 2022
16:00 UTC+2

| Royal AM (South Africa) | 2–0 | (Eswatini) Mbabane Highlanders |
|---|---|---|
| Domingues 45'; Gamildien 89' | Report |

Moses Mabhida Stadium, Durban
Referee: Eldrick Adelaide (Seychelles)

Royal AM won 2–0 on aggregate.

10 September 2022
16:00 UTC+1

| AS Santé d'Abéché (Chad) | 1–2 | (Mozambique) Ferroviário da Beira |
|---|---|---|
| Jatefe 6' (o.g.) | Report | Abdraman 28' (o.g.); Pepo 90' (pen.) |

Ahmadou Ahidjo Stadium, Yaoundé (Cameroon)
Referee: Jacinto Nchama (Equatorial Guinea)
18 September 2022
15:00 UTC+2

| Ferroviário da Beira (Mozambique) | 1–0 | (Chad) AS Santé d’Abéché |
|---|---|---|
| Nyanzira 63' | Report |

Estádio do Zimpeto, Maputo
Referee: Antonio Dungula (Angola)

Ferroviário da Beira won 3–1 on aggregate.

10 September 2022
16:00 UTC+1

| PWD Bamenda (Cameroon) | 1–1 | (Madagascar) Elgeco Plus |
|---|---|---|
| Ngondi 18' | Report | Ranaivoson 85' |

Kouekong Stadium, Bafoussam
Referee: Paterne Ouaboe (Central African Republic)
18 September 2022
16:00 UTC+3

| Elgeco Plus (Madagascar) | 1–0 | (Cameroon) PWD Bamenda |
|---|---|---|
| Razafimaro 32' | Report |

Mahamasina Municipal Stadium, Antananarivo
Referee: Tirelo Mositwane (Botswana)

Elgeco Plus won 2–1 on aggregate.

11 September 2022
20:00 UTC+1

| ASFAR (Morocco) | 1–1 | (Nigeria) Remo Stars |
|---|---|---|
| Diney 27' | Report | Olamilekan 49' |

Prince Moulay Abdellah Stadium, Rabat
Referee: Mohamed Adel (Egypt)
18 September 2022
16:00 UTC+1

| Remo Stars (Nigeria) | 0–1 | (Morocco) ASFAR |
|---|---|---|
| | Report | Gnadou 56' |

Remo Stars Stadium, Ikenne
Referee: Kouassi Attiogbe (Togo)

ASFAR won 2–1 on aggregate.

10 September 2022
16:00 UTC+0

| Ashanti Golden Boys (Guinea) | 2–0 | (Mauritania) Nouakchott Kings |
|---|---|---|
| Ramdhane 45' (o.g.); A. Camara 57' | Report |

General Lansana Conté Stadium, Conakry
Referee: Lenine dos Santos (Cape Verde)
16 September 2022
19:00 UTC+0

| Nouakchott Kings (Mauritania) | 1–0 | (Guinea) Ashanti Golden Boys |
|---|---|---|
| Samoura 37' (o.g.) | Report |

Stade Cheikha Ould Boïdiya, Nouakchott
Referee: Omar Sallah (Gambia)

Ashanti Golden Boys won 2–1 on aggregate.

9 September 2022
17:00 UTC+1

| Buffles du Borgou (Benin) | 0–1 | (Sierra Leone) Kallon |
|---|---|---|
| | Report | Conteh 63' |

Stade de l'Amitié, Cotonou
Referee: Nuruddeen Abubakar (Nigeria)
17 September 2022
16:00 UTC+0

| Kallon (Sierra Leone) | 3–0 | (Benin) Buffles du Borgou |
|---|---|---|
| M. Fofanah 42'; Conteh 63', 65' | Report |

SKD Stadium, Monrovia (Liberia) (Note: Teams from Sierra Leone played their home matches in Liberia, since their only stadium which satisfies the criteria of hosting international matches - the Siaka Steven Stadium in Freetown is undergoing long term renovations.)
Referee: Younoussa Camara (Guinea)

Kallon won 4–0 on aggregate.

10 September 2022
16:00 UTC+3

| Bul (Uganda) | 0–0 | (Egypt) Future |
|---|---|---|
| | Report |

St. Mary's Stadium-Kitende, Entebbe
Referee: Elsiddig Eltreefe (Sudan)
17 September 2022
21:00 UTC+2

| Future (Egypt) | 1–0 | (Uganda) Bul |
|---|---|---|
| Ngwem 77' | Report |

Cairo International Stadium, Cairo
Referee: Mehrez Malki (Tunisia)

Future won 1–0 on aggregate.

== Second round ==
The second round, also called the second preliminary round, included 32 teams: the 14 teams that received byes to this round, and the 18 winners of the first round.

| Team 1 | Agg. | Team 2 | 1st leg | 2nd leg |
|---|---|---|---|---|
| Kwara United (Nigeria) | 3–3 (a) | (Morocco) RS Berkane | 3–1 | 0–2 |
| Gagnoa (Ivory Coast) | 1–0 | (Algeria) JS Saoura | 1–0 | 0–0 |
| ASC Kara (Togo) | 1–4 | (Algeria) USM Alger | 0–2 | 1–2 |
| Real Bamako (Mali) | 3–1 | (Ghana) Hearts of Oak | 3–0 | 0–1 |
| Hilal Alsahil (Sudan) | 0–9 | (Egypt) Pyramids | 0–2 | 0–7 |
| Fasil Kenema (Ethiopia) | 0–1 | (Tunisia) Club Sfaxien | 0–0 | 0–1 |
| Kigali (Rwanda) | 0–1 | (Libya) Al Nasr | 0–0 | 0–1 |
| Kipanga (Zanzibar) | 0–7 | (Tunisia) Club Africain | 0–0 | 0–7 |
| Al Akhdar (Libya) | 3–2 | (Tanzania) Azam | 3–0 | 0–2 |
| Royal AM (South Africa) | 1–1 (a) | (Zambia) ZESCO United | 0–0 | 1–1 |
| Saint-Éloi Lupopo (Democratic Republic of the Congo) | 2–0 | (Angola) Sagrada Esperança | 2–0 | 0–0 |
| St Michel United (Seychelles) | 1–2 | (Democratic Republic of the Congo) Motema Pembe | 1–0 | 0–2 |
| Ferroviário da Beira (Mozambique) | 2–4 | (Republic of the Congo) Diables Noirs | 2–1 | 0–3 |
| Elgeco Plus (Madagascar) | 1–4 | (South Africa) Marumo Gallants | 1–3 | 0–1 |
| ASFAR (Morocco) | 5–0 | (Guinea) Ashanti Golden Boys | 4–0 | 1–0 |
| Kallon (Sierra Leone) | 0–6 | (Egypt) Future | 0–2 | 0–4 |

9 October 2022
16:00 UTC+1

| Kwara United (Nigeria) | 3–1 | (Morocco) RS Berkane |
|---|---|---|
| Abdultaofik 74'; Jimoh 81'; Barnabas 89' | Report | Ouattara 8' |

Onikan Stadium, Lagos
Referee: Djindo Houngnandande (Benin)
15 October 2022
20:00 UTC+1

| RS Berkane (Morocco) | 2–0 | (Nigeria) Kwara United |
|---|---|---|
| Ouattara 16'; El Bahri 54' | Report |

Stade Municipal de Berkane, Berkane
Referee: Haythem Guirat (Tunisia)

3–3 on aggregate. RS Berkane won on away goals.

8 October 2022
15:00 UTC+0

| Gagnoa (Ivory Coast) | 1–0 | (Algeria) JS Saoura |
|---|---|---|
| Goua 13' (pen.) | Report |

Stade de Yamoussoukro, Yamoussoukro
Referee: Charles Bulu (Ghana)
15 October 2022
15:00 UTC+1

| JS Saoura (Algeria) | 0–0 | (Ivory Coast) Gagnoa |
|---|---|---|
| | Report |

8 May 1945 Stadium, Sétif
Referee: Mutaz Ibrahim (Libya)

Gagnoa won 1–0 on aggregate.

9 October 2022
16:00 UTC+0

| ASC Kara (Togo) | 0–2 | (Algeria) USM Alger |
|---|---|---|
| | Report | Issaka 20' (o.g.); Mahious 47' (pen.) |

Stade de Kégué, Lomé
Referee: Jean Ouattara (Burkina Faso)
16 October 2022
19:00 UTC+1

| USM Alger (Algeria) | 2–1 | (Togo) ASC Kara |
|---|---|---|
| Meziane 37', 53' | Report | Ouro-Ayeva 58' |

8 May 1945 Stadium, Sétif
Referee: El Mabrouk Muhammad (Libya)

USM Alger won 4–1 on aggregate.

8 October 2022
16:00 UTC+0

| Real Bamako (Mali) | 3–0 | (Ghana) Hearts of Oak |
|---|---|---|
| C. Sidibé 11'; Bamba 30'; Diakité 75' | Report |

Stade du 26 Mars, Bamako
Referee: Bakary Gassama (Gambia)
16 October 2022
15:00 UTC+0

| Hearts of Oak (Ghana) | 1–0 | (Mali) Real Bamako |
|---|---|---|
| Amankwah 89' | Report |

Accra Sports Stadium, Accra
Referee: Yelebodom Bodjona (Togo)

Real Bamako won 3–1 on aggregate.

8 October 2022
18:00 UTC+2

| Hilal Alsahil (Sudan) | 0–2 | (Egypt) Pyramids |
|---|---|---|
| | Report | Ben Youssef 7'; Fathi 77' |

30 June Stadium, Cairo (Egypt)
Referee: Jean Claude Ishimwe (Rwanda)
15 October 2022
18:00 UTC+2

| Pyramids (Egypt) | 7–0 | (Sudan) Hilal Alsahil |
|---|---|---|
| Samy 4'; Ben Youssef 15', 18', 25'; Issa 23'; Sobhi 27'; Chibi 65' | Report |

30 June Stadium, Cairo
Referee: Noureddine El Jaafari (Morocco)

Pyramids won 9–0 on aggregate.

9 October 2022
16:00 UTC+3

| Fasil Kenema (Ethiopia) | 0–0 | (Tunisia) Club Sfaxien |
|---|---|---|
| | Report |

Bahir Dar Stadium, Bahir Dar
Referee: Andofetra Rakotojaona (Madagascar)
15 October 2022
16:00 UTC+1

| Club Sfaxien (Tunisia) | 1–0 | (Ethiopia) Fasil Kenema |
|---|---|---|
| Diakhité 38' | Report |

Stade Taïeb Mhiri, Sfax
Referee: Patrick Tanguy Vlei (Ivory Coast)

Club Sfaxien won 1–0 on aggregate.

8 October 2022
15:00 UTC+2

| Kigali (Rwanda) | 0–0 | (Libya) Al Nasr |
|---|---|---|
| | Report |

Stade Huye, Butare
Referee: Chelangat Sabilla (Uganda)
16 October 2022
19:00 UTC+2

| Al Nasr (Libya) | 1–0 | (Rwanda) Kigali |
|---|---|---|
| Elfaitory 70' | Report |

Benina Martyrs Stadium, Benghazi
Referee: Mahmood Ismail (Sudan)

Al Nasr won 1–0 on aggregate.

8 October 2022
16:15 UTC+3

| Kipanga (Zanzibar) | 0–0 | (Tunisia) Club Africain |
|---|---|---|
| | Report |

Amaan Stadium, Zanzibar City
Referee: Belay Tadesse (Ethiopia)
16 October 2022
16:00 UTC+1

| Club Africain (Tunisia) | 7–0 | (Zanzibar) Kipanga |
|---|---|---|
| Dhaouadi 2'; Amri 15'; H. Labidi 53'; C. Labidi 68'; Khalil 74', 85'; Ghandri 81' (pen.) | Report |

Stade Hammadi Agrebi, Tunis
Referee: Abdulwahid Huraywidah (Libya)

Club Africain won 7–0 on aggregate.

8 October 2022
19:00 UTC+2

| Al Akhdar (Libya) | 3–0 | (Tanzania) Azam |
|---|---|---|
| Sulaiman 11' (pen.); Manyama 36' (o.g.); Muftah 43' | Report |

Benina Martyrs Stadium, Benghazi
Referee: Mohamed Ali Moussa (Niger)
16 October 2022
19:00 UTC+3

| Azam (Tanzania) | 2–0 | (Libya) Al Akhdar |
|---|---|---|
| Mbombo 28'; Essien 59' (o.g.) | Report |

Chamazi Stadium, Dar es Salaam
Referee: Georges Gatogato (Burundi)

Al Akhdar won 3–2 on aggregate.

9 October 2022
16:00 UTC+2

| Royal AM (South Africa) | 0–0 | (Zambia) ZESCO United |
|---|---|---|
| | Report |

Moses Mabhida Stadium, Durban
Referee: Ahmad Heeralall (Mauritius)
15 October 2022
15:00 UTC+2

| ZESCO United (Zambia) | 1–1 | (South Africa) Royal AM |
|---|---|---|
| Sikombe 31' | Report | Gamildien 56' |

Levy Mwanawasa Stadium, Ndola
Referee: Omar Artan (Somalia)

1–1 on aggregate. Royal AM won on away goals.

8 October 2022
16:00 UTC+1

| Saint-Éloi Lupopo (Democratic Republic of the Congo) | 2–0 | (Angola) Sagrada Esperança |
|---|---|---|
| Makanda 30'; Baso 90+1' | Report |

Stade des Martyrs, Kinshasa
Referee: Messie Nkounkou (Congo)
15 October 2022
16:30 UTC+1

| Sagrada Esperança (Angola) | 0–0 | (Democratic Republic of the Congo) Saint-Éloi Lupopo |
|---|---|---|
| | Report |

Estádio 11 de Novembro, Luanda
Referee: Celso Alvação (Mozambique)

Saint-Éloi Lupopo won 2–0 on aggregate.

8 October 2022
16:00 UTC+4

| St Michel United (Seychelles) | 1–0 | (Democratic Republic of the Congo) Motema Pembe |
|---|---|---|
| Ravignia 54' | Report |

National Sports Complex Pitch 1, Saint Pierre (Mauritius) (Note: Teams from Seychelles played their home matches outside the country, since none of the stadiums met the quality standards set according to CAF regulations.)
Referee: Elly Sasii (Tanzania)
16 October 2022
15:30 UTC+1

| Motema Pembe (Democratic Republic of the Congo) | 2–0 | (Seychelles) St Michel United |
|---|---|---|
| Ikangalombo 12'; Mpiana 78' | Report |

Stade des Martyrs, Kinshasa
Referee: André Kolissala (Central African Republic)

Motema Pembe won 2–1 on aggregate.

8 October 2022
15:00 UTC+2

| Ferroviário da Beira (Mozambique) | 2–1 | (Republic of the Congo) Diables Noirs |
|---|---|---|
| Pepo 28'; Nyanzira 51' | Report | Massoumou 11' |

Estádio do Zimpeto, Maputo
Referee: Victor Gomes (South Africa)
16 October 2022
15:30 UTC+1

| Diables Noirs (Republic of the Congo) | 3–0 | (Mozambique) Ferroviário da Beira |
|---|---|---|
| Massoumou 3'; Bassinga 55'; Kibama 83' | Report |

Stade Alphonse Massemba-Débat, Brazzaville
Referee: Al Hadi Mahamat (Chad)

Diables Noirs won 4–2 on aggregate.

9 October 2022
16:00 UTC+3

| Elgeco Plus (Madagascar) | 1–3 | (South Africa) Marumo Gallants |
|---|---|---|
| Hasinirina 76' | Report | Mpambaniso 11'; Ngema 21' (pen.); Nku 89' |

Mahamasina Municipal Stadium, Antananarivo
Referee: Retselisitsoe Molise (Lesotho)
15 October 2022
15:00 UTC+2

| Marumo Gallants (South Africa) | 1–0 | (Madagascar) Elgeco Plus |
|---|---|---|
| Nonyane 39' | Report |

Peter Mokaba Stadium, Polokwane
Referee: Blaise Yuven Ngwa (Cameroon)

Marumo Gallants won 4–1 on aggregate.

9 October 2022
20:00 UTC+1

| ASFAR (Morocco) | 4–0 | (Guinea) Ashanti Golden Boys |
|---|---|---|
| Diakite 36'; Moufid 49'; Slim 57'; Ennafati 90' | Report |

Prince Moulay Abdellah Stadium, Rabat
Referee: Yousri Bouali (Tunisia)
14 October 2022
16:00 UTC+0

| Ashanti Golden Boys (Guinea) | 0–1 | (Morocco) ASFAR |
|---|---|---|
| | Report | El Bouchqali 90+1' |

General Lansana Conté Stadium, Conakry
Referee: Maguette N'Diaye (Senegal)

ASFAR won 5–0 on aggregate.

9 October 2022
16:00 UTC+0

| Kallon (Sierra Leone) | 0–2 | (Egypt) Future |
|---|---|---|
| | Report | Mohsen 48'; El Badry 90+4' |

SKD Stadium, Monrovia (Liberia)
Referee: Boubou Traoré (Mali)
16 October 2022
19:00 UTC+2

| Future (Egypt) | 4–0 | (Sierra Leone) Kallon |
|---|---|---|
| Sfaxi 12', 60'; Samir 68'; Maher 79' | Report |

Cairo International Stadium, Cairo
Referee: Mustapha Ghorbal (Algeria)

Future won 6–0 on aggregate.

== Playoff round ==
The playoff round, also called the additional second preliminary round, includes 32 teams: the 16 winners of the Confederation Cup second round, and the 16 losers of the Champions League second round.

The draw for the playoff round was held on 18 October 2022, 11:00 GMT (13:00 local time, UTC+2), at the CAF headquarters in Cairo, Egypt.

The teams were seeded by their performances in the CAF competitions for the previous five seasons (CAF 5-year ranking points shown in parentheses):

- Pot A contained the 7 seeded losers of the Champions League first round.
- Pot B contained the 9 unseeded winners of the Confederation Cup first round.
- Pot C contained the 9 unseeded losers of the Champions League first round.
- Pot D contained the 7 seeded winners of the Confederation Cup first round.

| Pot | Pot A | Pot B | Pot C | Pot D |
| Qualified from | Champions League | Confederation Cup | Champions League | Confederation Cup |
|---|---|---|---|---|
| Teams | (Democratic Republic of the Congo) TP Mazembe (43 pts); (Libya) Al Ahli Tripoli (15 pts); (Angola) 1º de Agosto (10 pts); (Ivory Coast) ASEC Mimosas (8 pts); (Mali) Djoliba (3.5 pts); (Eswatini) Royal Leopards (2.5 pts); (Burkina Faso) Rail Club du Kadiogo (Note: The identity of the winners of the tie between AS Vita Club and Rail Club du Kadiogo was not known at the time of the draw, as their CAF Champions League second round second leg fixture was scheduled to be played after the draw.) | (Republic of the Congo) Diables Noirs; (Democratic Republic of the Congo) Saint-Éloi Lupopo; (Egypt) Future; (Ivory Coast) Gagnoa; (Libya) Al Akhdar; (Mali) Real Bamako; (Morocco) ASFAR; (South Africa) Marumo Gallants; (South Africa) Royal AM | (Tanzania) Young Africans (0.5 pts); (Burundi) Flambeau du Centre; (Niger) ASN Nigelec; (Nigeria) Plateau United; (Nigeria) Rivers United; (Seychelles) La Passe; (South Africa) Cape Town City; (Togo) ASKO Kara; (Tunisia) US Monastir | (Morocco) RS Berkane (54 pts); (Egypt) Pyramids (34 pts); (Tunisia) Club Sfaxien (19 pts); (Libya) Al Nasr (6 pts); (Algeria) USM Alger (5 pts); (Tunisia) Club Africain (4 pts); (Democratic Republic of the Congo) Motema Pembe (3 pts) |

| Team 1 | Agg. | Team 2 | 1st leg | 2nd leg |
|---|---|---|---|---|
| Rail Club du Kadiogo (Burkina Faso) | 0–2 | (Democratic Republic of the Congo) Saint-Éloi Lupopo | 0–1 | 0–1 |
| Royal Leopards (Eswatini) | 2–4 | (Mali) Real Bamako | 1–1 | 1–3 |
| TP Mazembe (Democratic Republic of the Congo) | 3–0 | (South Africa) Royal AM | 2–0 | 1–0 |
| 1º de Agosto (Angola) | 2–2 (2–3 p) | (Egypt) Future | 1–1 | 1–1 |
| ASEC Mimosas (Ivory Coast) | 5–2 | (Ivory Coast) Gagnoa | 2–0 | 3–2 |
| Djoliba (Mali) | 0–4 | (Morocco) ASFAR | 0–0 | 0–4 |
| Al Ahli Tripoli (Libya) | 1–3 | (South Africa) Marumo Gallants | 1–0 | 0–3 |
| ASKO Kara (Togo) | 2–1 | (Tunisia) Club Sfaxien | 2–1 | 0–0 |
| Young Africans (Tanzania) | 1–0 | (Tunisia) Club Africain | 0–0 | 1–0 |
| Flambeau du Centre (Burundi) | 1–4 | (Democratic Republic of the Congo) Motema Pembe | 0–2 | 1–2 |
| Rivers United (Nigeria) | 6–1 | (Libya) Al Nasr | 5–0 | 1–1 |
| US Monastir (Tunisia) | 1–0 | (Morocco) RS Berkane | 1–0 | 0–0 |
| Cape Town City (South Africa) | 0–1 | (Algeria) USM Alger | 0–0 | 0–1 |
| ASN Nigelec (Niger) | 1–3 | (Egypt) Pyramids | 1–0 | 0–3 |
| La Passe (Seychelles) | 2–6 | (Republic of the Congo) Diables Noirs | 0–2 | 2–4 |
| Plateau United (Nigeria) | 4–4 (a) | (Libya) Al Akhdar | 4–1 | 0–3 |

2 November 2022
15:30 UTC+1

| Rail Club du Kadiogo (Burkina Faso) | 0–1 | (Democratic Republic of the Congo) Saint-Éloi Lupopo |
|---|---|---|
| | Report | Baso 15' |

Stade de l'Amitié, Cotonou (Benin)
Referee: Karim Sabry (Morocco)
9 November 2022
15:00 UTC+1

| Saint-Éloi Lupopo (Democratic Republic of the Congo) | 1–0 | (Burkina Faso) Rail Club du Kadiogo |
|---|---|---|
| Makusu 75' | Report |

Stade des Martyrs, Kinshasa
Referee: Mehrez Malki (Tunisia)

Saint-Éloi Lupopo won 2–0 on aggregate.

2 November 2022
15:00 UTC+2

| Royal Leopards (Eswatini) | 1–1 | (Mali) Real Bamako |
|---|---|---|
| Magagula 90' | Report | Koné 45' |

Somhlolo National Stadium, Lobamba
Referee: Djindo Houngnandande (Benin)
9 November 2022
16:00 UTC+0

| Real Bamako (Mali) | 3–1 | (Eswatini) Royal Leopards |
|---|---|---|
| Samabaly 45'; Diakité 54'; Mariko 89' | Report | Mbuli 5' |

Stade du 26 Mars, Bamako
Referee: Ibrahim Mutaz (Libya)

Real Bamako won 4–2 on aggregate.

2 November 2022
15:00 UTC+2

| TP Mazembe (Democratic Republic of the Congo) | 2–0 | (South Africa) Royal AM |
|---|---|---|
| Luzolo 57'; Kalaba 73' | Report |

Stade TP Mazembe, Lubumbashi
Referee: Mohamed Diraneh Guedi (Djibouti)
9 November 2022
19:00 UTC+2

| Royal AM (South Africa) | 0–1 | (Democratic Republic of the Congo) TP Mazembe |
|---|---|---|
| | Report | Bossu 43' |

Moses Mabhida Stadium, Durban
Referee: Chelanget Sabila (Uganda)

TP Mazembe won 3–0 on aggregate.

2 November 2022
16:00 UTC+1

| 1º de Agosto (Angola) | 1–1 | (Egypt) Future |
|---|---|---|
| Mawiya 90+3' | Report | Sfaxi 11' |

Estádio 11 de Novembro, Luanda
Referee: Daouda Guèye (Senegal)
9 November 2022
18:00 UTC+2

| Future (Egypt) | 1–1 | (Angola) 1º de Agosto |
|---|---|---|
| Kamal 90' | Report | Tshibamba 44' |
Penalties
| Marei (penalty missed); Kamal (penalty scored); Mohsen (penalty scored); Mohamed (penalty missed); Samir (penalty scored) | 3–2 | (penalty scored) Tshibamba; (penalty missed) Bonifácio; (penalty missed) Venancio; (penalty scored) Keliano; (penalty missed) Herenilson |

Al Ahly WE Al Salam Stadium, Cairo
Referee: Kalilou Traore (Ivory Coast)

2–2 on aggregate. Future won 3–2 on penalties.

2 November 2022
16:00 UTC+0

| ASEC Mimosas (Ivory Coast) | 2–0 | (Ivory Coast) Gagnoa |
|---|---|---|
| Zouzoua 39'; Pokou 62' | Report |

Stade de Yamoussoukro, Yamoussoukro
Referee: Lamin Jammeh (Gambia)
9 November 2022
16:00 UTC+0

| Gagnoa (Ivory Coast) | 2–3 | (Ivory Coast) ASEC Mimosas |
|---|---|---|
| Vieira 20'; Coulibaly 43' | Report | Oura 4'; Zouzoua 63'; Aka 74' (pen.) |

Stade de Yamoussoukro, Yamoussoukro
Referee: Merveil Mandekouzou (Central African Republic)

ASEC Mimosas won 5–2 on aggregate.

2 November 2022
15:00 UTC+0

| Djoliba (Mali) | 0–0 | (Morocco) ASFAR |
|---|---|---|
| | Report |

Stade du 26 Mars, Bamako
Referee: Joseph Ogabor (Nigeria)
9 November 2022
20:00 UTC+1

| ASFAR (Morocco) | 4–0 | (Mali) Djoliba |
|---|---|---|
| Slim 17' (pen.); Hrimat 61'; Hamza 65'; Diney 73' | Report |

Prince Moulay Abdellah Stadium, Rabat
Referee: Abongile Tom (South Africa)

ASFAR won 4–0 on aggregate.

2 November 2022
19:00 UTC+2

| Al Ahli Tripoli (Libya) | 1–0 | (South Africa) Marumo Gallants |
|---|---|---|
| Saltou 1' | Report |

Benina Martyrs Stadium, Benghazi
Referee: Jean Ouattara (Burkina Faso)
9 November 2022
15:00 UTC+2

| Marumo Gallants (South Africa) | 3–0 | (Libya) Al Ahli Tripoli |
|---|---|---|
| Mpambaniso 16'; Ngema 19'; Chivaviro 48' | Report |

Royal Bafokeng Stadium, Phokeng
Referee: Messie Nkounkou (Congo)

Marumo Gallants won 3–1 on aggregate.

2 November 2022
15:00 UTC+0

| ASKO Kara (Togo) | 2–1 | (Tunisia) Club Sfaxien |
|---|---|---|
| Ouattara 44', 62' | Report | Habbassi 58' (pen.) |

Stade de Kégué, Lomé
Referee: Bernard Camille (Seychelles)
9 November 2022
15:00 UTC+1

| Club Sfaxien (Tunisia) | 0–0 | (Togo) ASKO Kara |
|---|---|---|
| | Report |

Stade Taïeb Mhiri, Sfax
Referee: Abdel Aziz Bouh (Mauritania)

ASKO Kara won 2–1 on aggregate.

2 November 2022
16:00 UTC+3

| Young Africans (Tanzania) | 0–0 | (Tunisia) Club Africain |
|---|---|---|
| | Report |

National Stadium, Dar es Salaam
Referee: Celso Alvação (Mozambique)
9 November 2022
18:00 UTC+1

| Club Africain (Tunisia) | 0–1 | (Tanzania) Young Africans |
|---|---|---|
| | Report | Aziz Ki 79' |

Stade Hammadi Agrebi, Tunis
Referee: Issa Sy (Senegal)

Young Africans won 1–0 on aggregate.

2 November 2022
16:00 UTC+3

| Flambeau du Centre (Burundi) | 0–2 | (Democratic Republic of the Congo) Motema Pembe |
|---|---|---|
| | Report | Bayindula 57'; Mpiana 65' |

Chamazi Stadium, Dar es Salaam (Tanzania)
Referee: Patrice Milazare (Mauritius)
9 November 2022
19:00 UTC+1

| Motema Pembe (Democratic Republic of the Congo) | 2–1 | (Burundi) Flambeau du Centre |
|---|---|---|
| Bofafaka 19'; Mpiana 48' (pen.) | Report | Rukundo 38' (pen.) |

Stade des Martyrs, Kinshasa
Referee: Lotfi Bekouassa (Algeria)

Motema Pembe won 4–1 on aggregate.

2 November 2022
14:00 UTC+1

| Rivers United (Nigeria) | 5–0 | (Libya) Al Nasr |
|---|---|---|
| Duru 13' (pen.), 65' (pen.); Kazie 15'; Acquah 44'; Ohawume 73' | Report |

Adokiye Amiesimaka Stadium, Port Harcourt
Referee: Mohammad Maarouf (Egypt)
9 November 2022
21:00 UTC+2

| Al Nasr (Libya) | 1–1 | (Nigeria) Rivers United |
|---|---|---|
| Elfaitory 39' | Report | Nwagua 57' |

Benina Martyrs Stadium, Benghazi
Referee: Bamlak Tessema Weyesa (Ethiopia)

Rivers United won 6–1 on aggregate.

2 November 2022
18:00 UTC+1

| US Monastir (Tunisia) | 1–0 | (Morocco) RS Berkane |
|---|---|---|
| Boutiche 10' | Report |

Stade Mustapha Ben Jannet, Monastir
Referee: Mahmood Ismail (Sudan)
9 November 2022
20:00 UTC+1

| RS Berkane (Morocco) | 0–0 | (Tunisia) US Monastir |
|---|---|---|
| | Report |

Stade Municipal de Berkane, Berkane
Referee: Pierre Atcho (Gabon)

Union Monastirienne won 1–0 on aggregate.

2 November 2022
18:00 UTC+2

| Cape Town City (South Africa) | 0–0 | (Algeria) USM Alger |
|---|---|---|
| | Report |

Cape Town Stadium, Cape Town
Referee: Samuel Uwikunda (Rwanda)
9 November 2022
18:00 UTC+1

| USM Alger (Algeria) | 1–0 | (South Africa) Cape Town City |
|---|---|---|
| Merili 90' | Report |

8 May 1945 Stadium, Sétif
Referee: Gnama Aklesso (Togo)

USM Alger won 1–0 on aggregate.

2 November 2022
16:30 UTC+1

| ASN Nigelec (Niger) | 1–0 | (Egypt) Pyramids |
|---|---|---|
| Seyni 58' | Report |

Stade Général Seyni Kountché, Niamey
Referee: Omar Artan (Somalia)
9 November 2022
19:00 UTC+2

| Pyramids (Egypt) | 3–0 | (Niger) ASN Nigelec |
|---|---|---|
| El Karti 20'; El Said 48'; Lakay 56' | Report |

Cairo International Stadium, Cairo
Referee: Boubou Traoré (Mali)

Pyramids won 3–1 on aggregate.

4 November 2022
17:00 UTC+4

| La Passe (Seychelles) | 0–2 | (Republic of the Congo) Diables Noirs |
|---|---|---|
| | Report | Sikoula 6', 19' |

National Sports Complex Pitch 1, Saint Pierre (Mauritius)
Referee: Mohamed Athoumani (Comoros)
9 November 2022
15:30 UTC+1

| Diables Noirs (Republic of the Congo) | 4–2 | (Seychelles) La Passe |
|---|---|---|
| Ngana 10'; Bassinga 20'; Sikoula 23'; Bakoua 75' | Report | Ratianaridimby 51', 53' |

Stade Alphonse Massemba-Débat, Brazzaville
Referee: Kouassi Biro (Ivory Coast)

Diables Noirs won 6–2 on aggregate.

2 November 2022
16:00 UTC+1

| Plateau United (Nigeria) | 4–1 | (Libya) Al Akhdar |
|---|---|---|
| Mustapha 26'; Onyebuchi 40'; Hilary 74', 90' | Report | Papel 84' |

Moshood Abiola National Stadium, Abuja
Referee: Al Hadi Mahamat (Chad)
9 November 2022
17:00 UTC+2

| Al Akhdar (Libya) | 3–0 | (Nigeria) Plateau United |
|---|---|---|
| Alraheem 57'; Al-Zabbad 85'; Hamza 90+3' | Report |

Benina Martyrs Stadium, Benghazi
Referee: Blaise Yuven Ngwa (Cameroon)

4–4 on aggregate. Al Akhdar won on away goals.
