= 2022–23 JS Saoura season =

JS Saoura
2022–23 season
- Owner: Entreprise Nationale de Forage
- President: Mohamed Zerouati
- Head coach: Nacif Beyaoui (from 13 July 2022) (until 22 September 2022); Moufdi Cherdoud (from 26 September 2022) (until 22 October 2022); Moustapha Djallit (from 22 October 2022) (until 25 March 2023); Mustapha Sebaâ (from 25 March 2023) (until 27 March 2023); Mounir Zeghdoud (from 17 April 2023)
- Stadium: 20 August 1955 Stadium
- Ligue 1: 6th
- Algerian Cup: Semi-finals
- Confederation Cup: Second round
- Arab Cup: First round
- Top goalscorer: League: Oussama Bellatreche (6 goals); All: Oussama Bellatreche (8 goals)
- Biggest win: JS Saoura 6–0 JS Bendaoud
- Biggest defeat: JS Saoura 1–3 ASO Chlef
Home colours	Away colours	Third colours

The 2022–23 season, was JS Saoura's 11th consecutive season in the top flight of Algerian football. In addition to the domestic league, JS Saoura participated in the Algerian Cup, the Confederation Cup and the Arab Cup.

== Squad list ==
Players and squad numbers last updated on 5 February 2023.
Note: Flags indicate national team as has been defined under FIFA eligibility rules. Players may hold more than one non-FIFA nationality.

No.	Nat.	Position	Name	Date of birth (age)	Signed from
Goalkeepers
1	(Algeria)	GK	Zakaria Saidi	5 August 1996 (aged 26)	(Algeria) Olympique de Médéa
13	(Algeria)	GK	Aymen Mouyet	17 May 1999 (aged 23)	(Algeria) ES Sétif
16	(Algeria)	GK	Omar Hadji	9 November 1991 (aged 31)	(Algeria) Paradou AC
Defenders
2	(Algeria)	CB	Riyane Akacem	13 February 1999 (aged 23)	(Algeria) Youth system
3	(Algeria)	LB	Marwane Khelif	8 February 2000 (aged 22)	(Algeria) Youth system
4	(Algeria)	RB	Fayçal Mebarki	31 August 2000 (aged 22)	(Algeria) Youth system
5	(Algeria)	LB	Oussama Bouziani	8 September 2000 (aged 22)	(Algeria) Youth system
17	(Algeria)	CB	Mohamed Amrane	27 January 1994 (aged 28)	(Algeria) CA Bordj Bou Arreridj
18	(Algeria)	RB	Zakaria Zaitri	18 July 1998 (aged 24)	(Algeria) HB Chelghoum Laïd
24	(Algeria)	RB	Mohamed Lamine Boutouala	27 November 1999 (aged 23)	(Algeria) Youth system
27	(Algeria)	CB	Merzak Abaziz	18 February 1995 (aged 27)	(Algeria) NC Magra
Midfielders
7	(Algeria)	MF	Abdeldjalil Taki Eddine Saâd	12 March 1992 (aged 30)	(Algeria) MC Saida
8	(Algeria)	MF	Benamar Mellal	9 August 1993 (aged 29)	(Algeria) MC Oran
12	(Algeria)	MF	Islam Eddine Kaidi	3 August 2000 (aged 22)	(Algeria) Youth system
14	(Algeria)	MF	Khathir Baaziz	17 January 1995 (aged 27)	(Algeria) ASO Chlef
20	(Algeria)	MF	Houssem Bayoud	21 October 1998 (aged 24)	(Algeria) NA Hussein Dey
23	(Algeria)	MF	Karm Benkouider	31 March 1999 (aged 23)	(Algeria) NC Magra
25	(Algeria)	MF	Adel Bouchiba	10 November 1988 (aged 34)	(Algeria) Olympique de Médéa
26	(Algeria)	MF	Mohamed El Amine Hammia	21 December 1991 (aged 31)	(Algeria) USM Blida
Forwards
10	(Algeria)	FW	Oussama Bellatreche	3 July 1995 (aged 27)	(Algeria) WA Tlemcen
11	(Algeria)	FW	Aimen Lahmeri	28 May 1996 (aged 26)	(Algeria) GC Mascara
15	(Algeria)	FW	Ismaïl Saadi	4 April 1997 (aged 25)	(Algeria) ES Sétif
19	(Algeria)	FW	Dhiyaeddine Benyahia	13 July 2000 (aged 22)	(Algeria) USM Annaba
21	(Algeria)	FW	Mohamed Amine Ouis	6 December 1992 (aged 30)	(Algeria) ASO Chlef
22	(Algeria)	FW	Lyes Doucene	26 July 1994 (aged 28)	(Algeria) MC El Eulma

== Transfers ==
=== In ===
==== Summer ====
Date	Pos	Player	From club	Transfer fee	Source
28 June 2022	MF	(Algeria) Karm Benkouider	NC Magra	Free transfer	
2 July 2022	FW	(Guinea) Alkhaly Bangoura	(Tunisia) CA Bizertin	Free transfer	
11 July 2022	MF	(Algeria) Khathir Baaziz	ASO Chlef	Free transfer	
21 July 2022	FW	(Liberia) Van-Dave Harmon	(Albania) KF Laçi	Free transfer	
7 August 2022	MF	(Algeria) Houssem Bayoud	NA Hussein Dey	Free transfer	
7 August 2022	FW	(Algeria) Diaaeddine Benyahia	USM Annaba	Free transfer	
13 August 2022	RB	(Algeria) Zakaria Zaitri	HB Chelghoum Laïd	Free transfer	
16 August 2022	FW	(Algeria) Lyes Doucene	MC El Eulma	Free transfer	
20 August 2022	CB	(Algeria) Idir Mokeddem	RC Arbaâ	Free transfer	

==== Winter ====
Date	Pos	Player	From club	Transfer fee	Source
5 February 2023	CB	(Algeria) Merzak Abaziz	NC Magra	Free transfer	

=== Out ===
==== Summer ====
Date	Pos	Player	To club	Transfer fee	Source
3 July 2022	MF	(Algeria) Abdelkrim Allaoui	MC El Bayadh	Free transfer	
24 July 2022	MF	(Algeria) Belaid Hamidi	CR Belouizdad	35,000,000 DA	
7 August 2022	CB	(Algeria) Imadeddine Boubekeur	(Morocco) Wydad AC	Free transfer	
17 August 2022	MF	(Algeria) Mohamed Daoud	NC Magra	Free transfer	

==== Winter ====
Date	Pos	Player	To club	Transfer fee	Source
29 December 2022	FW	(Guinea) Alkhaly Bangoura	(Tunisia) CS Chebba	Free transfer	
5 February 2023	CB	(Algeria) Idir Mokeddem	Paradou AC	Free transfer	

== Pre-season and friendlies ==
6 August 2022 Friendly	USM Alger	2–2	JS Saoura	Bologhine
18:30	Belkacemi 12'; Bacha 38'		Mellal 10' (pen.); Mebarki 68'	Stadium: Omar Hamadi Stadium
Note: Lineup for JS Saoura - Saidi, Khelif, Mokeddem, Akacem, Ouis (Boutouala 46'), Bouchiba, Mellal (Baaziz 46'), Benkouider, Hammia, Harmon, Bangoura (Benyahia 46').

8 August 2022 Friendly	Paradou AC	0–1	JS Saoura	Hydra
17:00			Ouis 14'	Stadium: Stade Ahmed Falek
Note: Lineup for JS Saoura - Hadji, Zakaria (Boutouala 60'), Mokeddem, Mebarki, Bouziani (Khelif 60'), Baaziz, Mellal (Bouchiba 60'), Ouis (Benkouider 46'), Benyahia, Bangoura (Harmon 46'), Kaidi (Hammia 60').

13 August 2022 Friendly	ES Hammam-Sousse (Tunisia)	0–2	(Algeria) JS Saoura	Tunis, Tunisia
17:00 UTC+1			Mellal 13'; Benyahia 90+3'	Stadium: Kantaoui Club Stadium
Note: Lineup for JS Saoura - Saidi (Mouyet 46'), Boutouala (Zakaria 57'), Amrane, Akacem, Khelif, Bouchiba, Baaziz (Benkouider 57'), Mellal, Lahmeri, Hammia, Ouis (Bangoura 57').

18 August 2022 Friendly	US Monastir (Tunisia)	2–2	(Algeria) JS Saoura	Monastir, Tunisia
16:45 UTC+1	Boutiche 63' (pen.); Chortani 87'		Mellal 68'; Benyahia 75'	Stadium: Stade Mustapha Ben Jannet
Note: Lineup for JS Saoura - Saidi, Boutouala, Amrane, Akacem, Khelif, Baaziz, Bouchiba, Mellal, Bangoura, Ouis, Hammia.

== Competitions ==
=== Overview ===
Competition	Record								Started round	Final position / round	First match	Last match
Competition	G	W	D	L	GF	GA	GD	Win %	Started round	Final position / round	First match	Last match
Ligue 1	30	11	9	10	32	25	+7	36.67	—N/a	5th	27 August 2022	15 July 2023
Algerian Cup	5	4	0	1	12	3	+9	80.00	Round of 64	Semi-finals	17 December 2022	26 May 2023
Confederation Cup	2	0	1	1	0	1	−1	0.00	Second round	Second round	8 October 2022	15 October 2022
Arab Cup	2	0	1	1	1	2	−1	0.00	First round	First round	15 March 2023	21 March 2023
Total	39	15	11	13	45	31	+14	38.46				

Updated to match played 15 July 2023
Source: Competitions

=== Ligue 1 ===
==== League table ====
Pos	Team	Pld	W	D	L	GF	GA	GD	Pts	Qualification or relegation
3	MC Alger	30	12	11	7	21	20	+1	47	
4	MC El Bayadh	30	13	7	10	34	25	+9	46	
5	JS Saoura	30	11	9	10	32	25	+7	42	
6	ES Sétif	30	11	9	10	38	32	+6	42	
7	ASO Chlef	30	11	9	10	36	31	+5	42	Qualification for CAF Confederation Cup (Note: ASO Chlef qualified for the 2023–24 CAF Confederation Cup by winning the 2022–23 Algerian Cup.)

Updated to match(es) played on 15 July 2023. Source: the-sports.org
Rules for classification: 1) points; 2) head-to-head points; 3) head-to-head goal difference; 4) goal difference; 5) total goals; 6) fairplay ranking; 7) playoff.

==== Results summary ====
Overall								Home						Away					
Pld	W	D	L	GF	GA	GD	Pts	W	D	L	GF	GA	GD	W	D	L	GF	GA	GD
30	11	9	10	32	25	+7	42	9	4	2	24	8	+16	2	5	8	8	17	−9

Last updated: 15 July 2023.
Source: Competitive matches

==== Results by round ====
Round	1	2	3	4	5	6	7	8	9	10	11	12	13	14	15	16	17	18	19	20	21	22	23	24	25	26	27	28	29	30
Ground	H	A	A	H	A	H	A	H	A	H	A	H	A	H	A	A	H	H	A	H	A	H	A	H	A	H	A	H	A	H
Result	W	L	D	W	L	L	L	W	D	W	W	W	L	W	D	D	W	D	L	W	L	D	L	W	D	D	W	L	L	D
Position	4	8	9	5	8	10	12	9	10	8	7	6	6	4	5	6	4	4	5	5	5	6	8	5	6	6	3	5	6	5

Updated to match(es) played on 15 July 2023. Source: Competitive matches
A = Away; H = Home; W = Win; D = Draw; L = Loss

==== Matches ====
The league fixtures were announced on 19 July 2022.

27 August 2022 Round 1	JS Saoura	2–0	MC Alger	Béchar
20:00	Mellal 43', 77' (pen.)	Report		Stadium: 20 August 1955 Stadium; Referee: Mustapha Ghorbal

3 September 2022 Round 2	MC El Bayadh	2–0	JS Saoura	El Bayadh
17:00	Moussaoui 45+3' (pen.); Ghorab 75'	Report		Stadium: Zakaria Medjdoub Stadium; Referee: Abdelali Ibrir

10 September 2022 Round 3	US Biskra	0–0	JS Saoura	Biskra
20:00		Report		Stadium: 18 February Stadium; Referee: Amine Hansal

16 September 2022 Round 4	JS Saoura	1–0	RC Arbaâ	Béchar
20:00	Mellal 90+1' (pen.)	Report		Stadium: 20 August 1955 Stadium; Referee: Abdemoumene Touabti

24 September 2022 Round 5	NC Magra	1–0	JS Saoura	Magra
16:30	Salah 59'	Report		Stadium: Boucheligue Brothers Stadium; Referee: Abdellah Benchehida

2 October 2022 Round 6	JS Saoura	0–1	CR Belouizdad	Béchar
20:00		Report	Wamba 69'	Stadium: 20 August 1955 Stadium; Referee: Nabil Boukhalfa

21 October 2022 Round 9	USM Alger	1–1	JS Saoura	Dar El Beïda
15:00	Mahious 19'	Report	Amrane 67'	Stadium: Omar Benrabah Stadium; Referee: Mustapha Ghorbal

25 October 2022 Round 7	ASO Chlef	2–1	JS Saoura	Relizane
15:00	Fettouhi 22'; Kerroum 39'	Report	Lahmeri 20' (pen.)	Stadium: Tahar Zoughari Stadium; Referee: Anes Azrine

6 November 2022 Round 10	JS Saoura	1–0	USM Khenchela	Béchar
18:00	Bellatreche 62' (pen.)	Report		Stadium: 20 August 1955 Stadium; Referee: Mohamed Saidi

12 November 2022 Round 11	JS Kabylie	1–2	JS Saoura	Tizi Ouzou
18:00	Benyoucef 18'	Report	Bellatreche 44'; Benyahia 66'	Stadium: 1 November 1954 Stadium; Referee: Lyes Bekouassa

29 November 2022 Round 12	JS Saoura	5–0	HB Chelghoum Laïd	Béchar
18:00	Hammia 15' (pen.), 20'; Benyazli 53'; Bellatreche 60'; Saâd 79'	Report		Stadium: 20 August 1955 Stadium; Referee: Oussama Makfoudji

3 December 2022 Round 8	JS Saoura	3–1	CS Constantine	Béchar
17:00	Bellatreche 12', 21'; Saadi 60'	Report	Koukpo 58'	Stadium: 20 August 1955 Stadium; Referee: Bilal Bendjahene

7 December 2022 Round 13	Paradou AC	2–1	JS Saoura	Belouizdad
15:00	Aoued 7' (pen.); Boulbina 81'	Report	Benyahia 88'	Stadium: 20 August 1955 Stadium; Referee: Abdelmoumen Touabti

11 December 2022 Round 14	JS Saoura	1–0	MC Oran	Béchar
17:00	Saâd 20'	Report		Stadium: 20 August 1955 Stadium; Referee: Mohamed Tahar Milia

24 December 2022 Round 15	ES Sétif	0–0	JS Saoura	Sétif
18:00		Report		Stadium: 8 May 1945 Stadium; Referee: Akram Mecharia

10 February 2023 Round 16	MC Alger	1–1	JS Saoura	Algiers
16:00	Oukil 56'	Report	Akacem 15'	Stadium: Stade du 5 Juillet; Referee: Lahlou Benbraham

19 February 2023 Round 17	JS Saoura	2–0	MC El Bayadh	Béchar
17:00	Bellatreche 17' (pen.); Lahmeri 49'	Report		Stadium: 20 August 1955 Stadium; Referee: Ali Nader

25 February 2023 Round 18	JS Saoura	1–1	US Biskra	Béchar
18:00	Doucene 21'	Report	Siam 46'	Stadium: 20 August 1955 Stadium; Referee: Redouane Allou

10 March 2023 Round 19	RC Arbaâ	2–0	JS Saoura	Larbaâ
15:00	Kessili 7', 73'	Report		Stadium: Ismaïl Makhlouf Stadium; Referee: Akram Mecharia

5 April 2023 Round 21	CR Belouizdad	2–0	JS Saoura	Algiers
22:00	Iwuala 38'; Bouguerra 85'	Report		Stadium: Stade du 5 Juillet; Referee: Mustapha Ghorbal

9 April 2023 Round 22	JS Saoura	1–1	ASO Chlef	Béchar
22:00	Doucene 33'	Report	Souibaâh 23' (pen.)	Stadium: 20 August 1955 Stadium; Referee: Bilal Bendjahene

18 April 2023 Round 20	JS Saoura	2–0	NC Magra	Béchar
22:00	Lahmeri 21'; Doucene 66'	Report		Stadium: 20 August 1955 Stadium; Referee: Anes Azrine

17 May 2023 Round 23	CS Constantine	2–0	JS Saoura	Constantine
16:00	Madani 23'; Dib 61' (pen.)	Report		Stadium: Ramadane Ben Abdelmalek Stadium; Referee: Lyes Bekouassa

6 June 2023 Round 25	USM Khenchela	0–0	JS Saoura	Khenchela
16:30		Report		Stadium: Amar Hamam Stadium; Referee: Ali Nader

27 June 2023 Round 24	JS Saoura	2–0	USM Alger	Béchar
19:00	Mellel 22'; Hammia 90' (pen.)	Report		Stadium: 20 August 1955 Stadium; Referee: Abdelmoumen Touabti

1 July 2023 Round 26	JS Saoura	2–2	JS Kabylie	Béchar
17:00	Hammia 12' (pen.), 90+1'	Report	Redjem 63'; Gatal 90+4'	Stadium: 20 August 1955 Stadium; Referee: Nabil Boukhalfa

4 July 2023 Round 27	HB Chelghoum Laïd	0–2	JS Saoura	Chelghoum Laïd
17:00		Report	Saâd 4'; Doucene 63'	Stadium: 11 December 1961 Stadium; Referee: El Hadj Aissa Semmache

7 July 2023 Round 28	JS Saoura	0–1	Paradou AC	Béchar
17:15		Report	Kohili 89'	Stadium: 20 August 1955 Stadium; Referee: Abdellah Benchehida

10 July 2023 Round 29	MC Oran	1–0	JS Saoura	Oran
17:15	Benamara 72'	Report		Stadium: Ahmed Zabana Stadium; Referee: Elhadj Chihaoui

15 July 2023 Round 30	JS Saoura	1–1	ES Sétif	Béchar
20:00	Salem 11' (o.g.)	Report	Boucif 61'	Stadium: 20 August 1955 Stadium; Referee: Mohamed Belkebir

=== Algerian Cup ===
17 December 2022 Round of 64	JS Saoura	6–0	JS Bendaoud	Béchar
17:00	Saadi 15'; Saâd 31'; Benyazli 49'; Benyahia 67'; Doucene 69'; Mellal 76'	Report		Stadium: 20 August 1955 Stadium; Referee: Oussama Boumesjed
Note: Lineups for JS Saoura - Hadji, Mebarki, Amrane (Akacem, 46'), Khelif, Baaziz, Mellal, Boutouala (Benkouider, 46'), Bayoud, Saâdi, Kaidi, Saâd (Benyazli, 46').(Benyahia, '), (Doucene, ')

14 February 2023 Round of 32	ES Sétif	0–1 (a.e.t.)	JS Saoura	Sétif
16:30		Report	Lahmeri 106'	Stadium: 8 May 1945 Stadium; Referee: Lyes Bekouassa
Note: Lineups for JS Saoura - Saidi, Akacem, Amrane, Khelif, Zaitri, Baaziz, Bouchiba, Mellal, Saâdi (Lahmeri, 60'), Bellatreche (Benyahia, 114'), Saâd (Ouis, 83').

29 April 2023 Round of 16	JS Saoura	2–0	JS Djijel	Béchar
20:00	Bellatreche 29'; Saadi 47'	Report		Stadium: 20 August 1955 Stadium; Referee: Hamza Bouslimani
Note: Lineups for JS Saoura - Saidi, Akacem, Amrane, Kaidi (Bouchiba, 66'), Zaitri, Baaziz, Saâdi (Bayoud, 60'), Bellatreche, Doucene, Lahmeri, Benyahia (Hammia, 66').

12 May 2023 Quarter-finals	JS Saoura	2–0	Paradou AC	Béchar
20:00	Zaitri 13'; Bellatreche 77'			Stadium: 20 August 1955 Stadium; Referee: Ali Nader
Note: Lineups for JS Saoura - Saidi, Akacem, Amrane, Zaitri, Baaziz (Kaidi, '), Bouchiba, Saâdi (Bayoud, '), Bellatreche, Doucene (Saâd, '), Lahmeri, Benyahia (Hammia, ').

26 May 2023 Semi-finals	JS Saoura	1–3	ASO Chlef	Oran
18:00	Hammia 75' (pen.)	Report	Souibaâh 13'; Aliane 46'; Fettouhi 51'	Stadium: Miloud Hadefi Stadium; Referee: Mustapha Ghorbal
Note: Lineups for JS Saoura - Saidi, Mebarki, Amrane, Zaitri, Kaidi, Baaziz (Mellal, 55'), Bouchiba, Saâdi, Bellatreche (Saâd, 55'), Doucene (Hammia, 70'), Benyahia.

=== Confederation Cup ===
==== Qualifying rounds ====
In the qualifying rounds, each tie will be played on a home-and-away two-legged basis. If the aggregate score will be tied after the second leg, the away goals rule was applied, and if still tied, extra time will not be played, and the penalty shoot-out will be used to determine the winner (Regulations III. 13 & 14).

===== Second round =====
8 October 2022 First leg	Gagnoa (Ivory Coast)	1–0	(Algeria) JS Saoura	Yamoussoukro
16:00	Goua 13' (pen.)	Report		Stadium: Stade de Yamoussoukro; Referee: Charles Bulu (Ghana)

15 October 2022 Second leg	JS Saoura (Algeria)	0–0 (0–1 agg.)	(Ivory Coast) Gagnoa	Sétif
15:00		Report		Stadium: 8 May 1945 Stadium; Referee: Ibrahim Mutaz (Libya)

=== Arab Club Champions Cup ===
==== First round ====
15 March 2023 First leg	Kuwait SC	1–0	(Algeria) JS Saoura	Kuwait City
18:30 UTC+3	Marhoon 60'	Report		Stadium: Al-Kuwait Sports Club Stadium; Referee: Faisal Al-Blwi (Saudi Arabia)

21 March 2023 Second leg	JS Saoura (Algeria)	1–1 (1–2 agg.)	Kuwait SC	Oran
18:00 UTC+1	Doucene 76'	Report	Khenissi 64'	Stadium: Miloud Hadefi Stadium; Referee: Dahane Beida (Mauritania)

== Squad information ==
=== Playing statistics ===
No.	Pos	Nat	Player	Total		Ligue 1		Algerian Cup		Confederation Cup		Arab Cup	
No.	Pos	Nat	Player	Apps	Goals	Apps	Goals	Apps	Goals	Apps	Goals	Apps	Goals
Goalkeepers
1	GK	(Algeria) ALG	Zakaria Saidi	31	0	23	0	4	0	2	0	2	0
13	GK	(Algeria) ALG	Aymen Mouyet	6	0	6	0	0	0	0	0	0	0
16	GK	(Algeria) ALG	Omar Hadji	2	0	1	0	1	0	0	0	0	0
40	GK	(Algeria) ALG	Mohamed Achraf Kaddouri	2	0	1	0	1	0	0	0	0	0
Defenders
2	DF	(Algeria) ALG	Riyane Akacem	32	1	24	1	4	0	2	0	2	0
3	DF	(Algeria) ALG	Marwane Khelif	21	0	19	0	2	0	0	0	0	0
4	DF	(Algeria) ALG	Fayçal Mebarki	16	0	14	0	2	0	0	0	0	0
5	DF	(Algeria) ALG	Oussama Bouziani	3	0	3	0	0	0	0	0	0	0
17	DF	(Algeria) ALG	Mohamed Amrane	37	1	28	1	5	0	2	0	2	0
18	DF	(Algeria) ALG	Zakaria Zaitri	26	1	18	0	4	1	2	0	2	0
24	DF	(Algeria) ALG	Mohamed Lamine Boutouala	9	0	8	0	1	0	0	0	0	0
27	DF	(Algeria) ALG	Merzak Abaziz	1	0	1	0	0	0	0	0	0	0
Midfielders
7	MF	(Algeria) ALG	Abdeldjalil Taki Eddine Saâd	28	4	20	3	4	1	2	0	2	0
8	MF	(Algeria) ALG	Benamar Mellal	30	5	24	4	3	1	1	0	2	0
12	MF	(Algeria) ALG	Islam Eddine Kaidi	22	0	15	0	4	0	2	0	1	0
14	MF	(Algeria) ALG	Khathir Baaziz	27	0	20	0	5	0	1	0	1	0
20	MF	(Algeria) ALG	Houssem Bayoud	8	0	5	0	3	0	0	0	0	0
23	MF	(Algeria) ALG	Karm Benkouider	18	0	16	0	1	0	1	0	0	0
25	MF	(Algeria) ALG	Adel Bouchiba	35	0	27	0	4	0	2	0	2	0
Forwards
10	FW	(Algeria) ALG	Oussama Bellatreche	29	8	21	6	4	2	2	0	2	0
11	FW	(Algeria) ALG	Aimen Lahmeri	22	4	16	3	3	1	2	0	1	0
15	FW	(Algeria) ALG	Ismaïl Saâdi	35	3	26	1	5	2	2	0	2	0
19	FW	(Algeria) ALG	Diaaeddine Benyahia	30	4	22	3	5	1	1	0	2	0
21	FW	(Algeria) ALG	Mohamed Amine Ouis	22	0	19	0	1	0	1	0	1	0
22	FW	(Algeria) ALG	Lyes Doucene	29	5	22	3	4	1	1	0	2	1
26	FW	(Algeria) ALG	Mohamed El Amine Hammia	30	6	25	5	3	1	1	0	1	0
28	FW	(Algeria) ALG	Islam Benyazli	2	1	1	1	1	0	0	0	0	0
Players transferred out during the season
6	DF	(Algeria) ALG	Idir Mokeddem	5	0	5	0	0	0	0	0	0	0
9	FW	(Guinea) GUI	Alkhaly Bangoura	7	0	6	0	0	0	1	0	0	0

Last updated: 15 July 2023
Source: soccerway.com

=== Goalscorers ===
As of 15 July 2023

Includes all competitive matches. The list is sorted alphabetically by surname when total goals are equal.

No.	Nat.	Player	Pos.	L 1	AC	CC 3	ACC	TOTAL
10	(Algeria)	Oussama Bellatreche	FW	6	2	0	0	8
26	(Algeria)	Mohamed El Amine Hammia	MF	5	1	0	0	6
22	(Algeria)	Lyes Doucene	FW	4	1	0	1	6
8	(Algeria)	Benamar Mellal	MF	4	1	0	0	5
11	(Algeria)	Aimen Lahmeri	FW	3	1	0	0	4
7	(Algeria)	Abdeldjalil Taki Eddine Saâd	MF	3	1	0	0	4
19	(Algeria)	Dhiyaeddine Benyahia	FW	2	1	0	0	3
15	(Algeria)	Ismaïl Saadi	FW	1	2	0	0	3
28	(Algeria)	Islam Benyazli	FW	1	1	0	0	2
17	(Algeria)	Mohamed Amrane	DF	1	0	0	0	1
2	(Algeria)	Riyane Akacem	DF	1	0	0	0	1
18	(Algeria)	Zakaria Zaitri	DF	0	1	0	0	1
Own Goals				1	0	0	0	1
Totals				32	12	0	1	45
