= Thierry Camille =

Seychelles footballer

Thiery Camille
Personal information
- Full name: Thiery Jean-Marc Brad Camille
- Date of birth: 11 December 2001 (age 24)
- Place of birth: Victoria, Seychelles
- Height: 1.84 m (6 ft 0 in)
- Position: Winger

Team information
- Current team: Ptl Bazar Brothers FC
- Number: 11

Senior career*
Years	Team	Apps	(Gls)
2018–	Saint John Bosco		(10)
2017–2023	→ Au Cap (loan)		(5)
	Bazar Brothers		(4)

International career^{‡}
2021–	Seychelles	5	(0)
- * Club domestic league appearances and goals ‡ National team caps and goals as of 17:34, 29 January 2022 (UTC)

Thiery Camille (born 11 December 2001) is a Seychellois association footballer who plays for Bazar Brothers of the Seychelles Premier League, and the Seychelles national team.

== Club career ==
Camille has played for Saint John Bosco of the Seychelles First Division since at least 2018. For the 2019–2020 season, he went on loan to Au Cap FCIn 2023 he moved to ptl bazar brothers.

== International career ==
In 2019 Camille was part of the Seychelle's squad that competed in the 2019 COSAFA U-20 Cup. He was called up to the senior squad in November 2021 for the 2021 Four Nations Football Tournament. He went on to make his senior international debut on 19 November 2021 against Sri Lanka in the final. At 18-years-old, Camille was the youngest member of the squad which went on to win the competition.

=== International career statistics ===
As of match played 19 November 2021

Seychelles national team
Year	Apps	Goals	assists
2021	1	0	1
2022	0	0	0
2023	4	0	0
Total	5	0	1
