= Victoria City AC =

- Full name: Victoria City Athletic Club
- Founded: 2014
- Dissolved: 2020
- Ground: Stade Linité, Victoria, Seychelles
- Capacity: 10,000
- League: Seychelles League
- 2019: 6th

Victoria City Athletic Club is a football club based in Victoria, Seychelles. It currently plays in Seychelles League.

== History ==
The club was originally called Real Boyz FC. For the 2014 season, the name was changed to Victoria City as the club joined the third division. Eventually the club was shifted to the second division for the 2014 season based uponthe performance of Real Boyz the previous season. At the halfway point of their first season, the club sat in the middle of the table with a chance at promotion to the top division. The club was still in the second division entering the 2016 season. That season, Victoria City defeated Au Cap FC 4–2 to win the PillayR Group Cup.

The club finished first in the second division in 2017 and earned promotion to the Seychelles Premier League for the first time. In December 2019, the Seychelles Football Federation announced that Victoria City AC were no longer registered with the association. The club's membership was revoked after it forfeited a Premier League match against Côte d'Or FC and informed the federation they would not attend their next cup fixture. According to the federations bylaws, a club is excluded for the season after forfeiting two matches. In May 2020 it was announced that Victoria City had ceased operations, in part because of the COVID-19 pandemic in the Seychelles.

== Stadium ==
The team played at the 10,000-capacity Stade Linité.
