= Mahmoud Marei (footballer) =

Egyptian footballer (born 1998)

Mahmoud Marei مَحْمُود مَرْعِيّ
Personal information
- Full name: Mahhmoud Marei Abdelfadil Sharafeldin
- Date of birth: 24 April 1998 (age 28)
- Place of birth: Egypt
- Position: Center-back

Team information
- Current team: Pyramids FC
- Number: 3

Senior career*
| Years | Team | Apps | (Gls) |
| 2017–2021 | Wadi Degla SC | 101 | (4) |
| 2021–2023 | Future FC | 53 | (2) |
| 2024– | Pyramids FC | 68 | (1) |

International career
| 2017 | Egypt U20 | 3 | (0) |
| 2023 | Egypt | 1 | (0) |
- * Club domestic league appearances and goals

Mahmoud Marei Abdelfadil Sharafeldin (Arabic: مَحْمُود مَرْعِيّ عَبْد الْفَضِيل شَرَف الدِّين; born 24 April 1998) is an Egyptian footballer who plays as a center-back for Egyptian Premier League side Pyramids FC and the Egypt national team.

== Biography ==
Mahmoud Marei was born on April 24, 1998, in Egypt. He started his football career at the youth club of Wadi Degla SC. He was promoted to the first team in the 2017/2018 season where he played for years, with over one hundred appearances before moving to Future FC. He also played for the Egypt national under-20 football team during the 2017 Africa U-20 Cup of Nations where he played three matches against Mali, Guinea and Zambia.

== Career statistics ==
=== Club ===
As of match played 5 June 2025

Appearances and goals by club, season and competition
| Club | Season | League | | | National cup (Note: Includes Egypt Cup) | | League cup (Note: Includes Egyptian League Cup) | | Continental | | Other | | Total | |
| Club | Season | Division | Apps | Goals | Apps | Goals | Apps | Goals | Apps | Goals | Apps | Goals | Apps | Goals |
|---|---|---|---|---|---|---|---|---|---|---|---|---|---|---|
| Wadi Degla | 2016-17 | Egyptian Premier League | 5 | 0 | 1 | 0 | – | | – | | – | | 6 | 0 |
| Wadi Degla | 2017-18 | Egyptian Premier League | 16 | 2 | 2 | 0 | – | | – | | – | | 18 | 2 |
| Wadi Degla | 2018-19 | Egyptian Premier League | 23 | 3 | 1 | 0 | – | | – | | – | | 24 | 3 |
| Wadi Degla | 2019-20 | Egyptian Premier League | 25 | 0 | 2 | 0 | – | | – | | – | | 27 | 0 |
| Wadi Degla | 2020-21 | Egyptian Premier League | 24 | 0 | 2 | 0 | – | | – | | – | | 26 | 0 |
| Wadi Degla | Total | | 93 | 5 | 8 | 0 | – | | – | | – | | 101 | 5 |
| Modern Sport | 2021-22 | Egyptian Premier League | 29 | 1 | 1 | 0 | 3 | 0 | – | | – | | 33 | 1 |
| Modern Sport | 2022-23 | Egyptian Premier League | 23 | 0 | 2 | 0 | – | | 12 (Note: Appearance(s) in CAF Confederation Cup) | 0 | – | | 37 | 0 |
| Modern Sport | Total | | 52 | 1 | 3 | 0 | 3 | 0 | 12 | 0 | – | | 68 | 1 |
| Pryamids | 2023-24 | Egyptian Premier League | 21 | 1 | 2 | 0 | – | | 1 (Note: Appearance(s) in CAF Champions League) | 0 | 1 (Note: Appearance(s) in Egyptian Super Cup) | 0 | 25 | 1 |
| Pryamids | 2024-25 | Egyptian Premier League | 15 | 0 | 4 | 0 | 2 | 0 | 13 | 0 | 1 | 0 | 35 | 0 |
| Pryamids | Total | | 36 | 1 | 6 | 0 | 2 | 0 | 14 | 0 | 2 | 0 | 60 | 1 |
| Career Total | | | 181 | 7 | 16 | 0 | 5 | 0 | 26 | 0 | 2 | 0 | 229 | 7 |

=== International ===
As of match played 18 June 2023

Appearances and goals by national team and year
| National team | Year | Apps | Goals |
|---|---|---|---|
| Egypt | 2023 | 1 | 0 |

== Trophies ==
Modern Sport

- Egyptian League Cup: 2022

Pyramids

- Egypt Cup: 2023–24
- CAF Champions League: 2024–25
- CAF Super Cup: 2025
- FIFA African–Asian–Pacific Cup: 2025

Egypt U23

- U-23 Africa Cup of Nations: 2019
