= David Peter =

- דוד פטר

Faction represented in the Knesset
- 2026–: Likud

Personal details
- Born: 1987 (age 38–39) Hungary
- Party: Likud
- Spouse: Tzipi Peter
- Children: 3
- Education: Bar-Ilan University (LL.B., master's degree)
- Occupation: Lawyer, legal commentator

David Peter (Hebrew: דוד פטר; born 1987) is an Israeli lawyer, Knesset member, legal commentator, and political figure specializing in administrative law and constitutional law. He has represented the Israeli government and government ministers in proceedings before the Supreme Court of Israel, sitting as the High Court of Justice, and previously worked as a researcher at the conservative Kohelet Policy Forum.

In September 2026, Prime Minister Benjamin Netanyahu selected Peter for the 16th position on the Likud electoral list ahead of the 2026 Israeli legislative election. Peter was elected to the Knesset as the party won 27 seats.

== Early life and education ==
Peter was born in Hungary in 1987, during the final years of the country's communist period, to Reuven and Shoshana Peter. His family is descended from Holocaust survivors. His parents grew up in Budapest under communist rule, an experience that Peter has described as influential in shaping their political and social outlook.

According to Peter, his family's original surname was Pulitzer, derived from their ancestral connection to the town of Politz. He has a half-sister from his mother's previous marriage.

Peter immigrated to Israel with his family when he was approximately 18 months old. The family initially lived in an immigrant absorption center in Mevaseret Zion before moving to Haifa, where he grew up and received his education.

Peter earned a bachelor's degree in law and a master's degree in finance from Bar-Ilan University. He subsequently began doctoral studies at the university.

He completed his legal internship under attorney Zeev Sharaf, specializing in private commercial litigation.

== Legal career ==
Peter began his legal career in commercial litigation in the private sector and legal advisory work in the public sector.

In 2019, he joined the Kohelet Policy Forum as a legal researcher. During his time at the organization, he published research papers and policy analyses addressing the relationship between Israel's branches of government, the role of the judiciary, and the constitutional powers of state institutions.

His research focused particularly on judicial activism, government immigration policy, and the powers and conduct of the Attorney General of Israel. His publications criticized what he regarded as excessive judicial intervention and the expanding authority of government legal advisers.

Peter subsequently established an independent law practice specializing in administrative and constitutional litigation.

=== Representation of government ministers ===
Peter has represented the Israeli government and individual ministers in several proceedings before the High Court of Justice, including cases in which the Attorney General declined to defend the government's position and separate legal representation was authorized.

==== Appointment of Ofir Akunis as justice minister ====
In April 2021, Peter, then a researcher at the Kohelet Policy Forum, represented Prime Minister Benjamin Netanyahu and Ofir Akunis in proceedings concerning the attempted appointment of Akunis as justice minister.

The appointment was challenged after Attorney General Avichai Mandelblit declared the government vote invalid.

During the proceedings, Peter argued that the government was legally entitled to make decisions contrary to the Attorney General's position. The court rejected this interpretation, reiterating that the Attorney General's legal opinions are binding on the government unless a court rules otherwise.

==== Representation of Itamar Ben-Gvir ====
Peter represented National Security Minister Itamar Ben-Gvir in proceedings concerning his ministerial powers and petitions seeking his removal from office.

His legal arguments included the position that the appointment and dismissal of government ministers are primarily political matters in which judicial intervention should be limited.

==== Representation of Yariv Levin ====
Peter also participated in legal proceedings involving Justice Minister Yariv Levin and the scope of his statutory powers.

Among these were proceedings concerning the appointment of a person to oversee the investigation involving the former Military Advocate General. The court rejected Levin's request to appoint retired judge Asher Kula to the role.

==== Appointment of the Civil Service Commissioner ====
Peter represented the Israeli government's position in petitions challenging its proposed procedure for appointing the Civil Service Commissioner without a public search committee.

The dispute concerned the government's discretion over senior civil service appointments and the legal requirements governing the selection process.

==== Closure of Galei Tzahal ====
Peter represented the Israeli government and the defense minister in proceedings challenging the government's decision to close the military radio station Galei Tzahal.

On 20 August 2026, the High Court of Justice unanimously accepted the petitions and invalidated the government's decision to close the station. The court held that the decision had been influenced by an improper consideration: government officials' dissatisfaction with broadcasts that they perceived as contrary to their positions.

=== Government legal representation and legal fees ===
In March 2026, an investigation by Shomrim, an Israeli investigative journalism organization, examined the government's increasing use of privately retained lawyers to defend decisions that the Attorney General had declined to support.

The investigation identified Peter as one of the lawyers who had received government contracts for such representation. According to the report, his involvement in five petitions was associated with approved legal fees totaling approximately NIS 649,000, paid from public funds.

The investigation raised questions about the government's use of exemptions from competitive tender procedures, the selection of lawyers perceived as politically aligned with government ministers, and the level of legal fees paid for their services.

== Media commentary ==
Peter has written opinion articles and legal commentary, particularly for the newspaper Makor Rishon. His writing generally reflects a conservative approach to constitutional interpretation and frequently criticizes the expansion of judicial authority relative to the elected branches of government.

He has also published commentary or appeared as a legal analyst in Israeli media outlets including N12, Ynet, Globes, 103fm, and Now 14.

In appearances on Now 14 in August and September 2026, Peter claimed that all hostages abducted during the 7 October attacks had survived and returned alive. The claim was inaccurate: 41 hostages who had been abducted alive were subsequently killed or died in captivity. His remarks received renewed media attention following his selection for the Likud electoral list.

== Political career ==
In September 2026, Benjamin Netanyahu, leader of Likud, selected Peter for the 16th position on the party's electoral list for the 2026 Israeli legislative election. The position was one of the places reserved for candidates personally selected by Netanyahu.

Peter was elected to the Knesset as Likud won 27 seats.

== Personal life ==
Peter is married to Tzipi Peter. The couple have three children and live in Yakir, an Israeli settlement in the West Bank.

== Selected publications ==
- Peter, David (8 January 2023). "A new constitutional remedy in the Supreme Court: Judicial editing of legislation". Reshut HaRabim (in Hebrew).
- Peter, David (3 August 2022). "Legal advice: Binding but secret law – Following the Zomer ruling". Reshut HaRabim (in Hebrew).

== See also ==
- Kohelet Policy Forum
- Attorney General of Israel
- 2026 Israeli legislative election
