= Ruzaigh Gamildien =

South African soccer player

Personal information
- Date of birth: 4 April 1989 (age 37)
- Place of birth: Cape Town, South Africa
- Height: 1.70 m (5 ft 7 in)
- Positions: Attacking midfielder; winger

Team information
- Current team: Chippa United
- Number: 2

Youth career
- Matroosfontein United
- –2010: Santos

Senior career*
Years	Team	Apps	(Gls)
2010–2011	Milano United		
2011–2014	Bloemfontein Celtic	46	(8)
2014	AmaZulu	12	(1)
2015	Milano United	4	(0)
2015–2016	Ajax Cape Town	7	(1)
2017	Santos Cape Town	6	(0)
2017–2018	Cape Town All Stars	25	(7)
2017–2019	Chippa United	21	(1)
2019–2020	Steenberg United	17	(11)
2020	Chippa United	10	(1)
2020–2022	Swallows	47	(16)
2022–2024	Royal AM	31	(6)
2024–2025	Durban City		
2025–	Chippa United	4	(0)

International career
2013	South Africa	3	(0)
- * Club domestic league appearances and goals as of 4 January 2026

Ruzaigh Gamildien (born 4 April 1989) is a South African professional soccer player who plays as a midfielder for Chippa United.
