= Real Maldive FC =

Seychellois football club

- Full name: Real Maldive Football Club
- Ground: Stade Linité
- Capacity: 10,000
- Chairman: Bradley Dugasse
- Manager: Don Anacoura
- League: Seychelles Premier League
- 2025–26: 6th
- Website: https://www.facebook.com/groups/372288832907238/

Real Maldive FC is a Seychellois association football club based in Anse Etoile that currently competes in the Seychelles Premier League. The club also fields a beach soccer side.
