= Au Cap FC =

Seychellois football club

- Full name: Au Cap Football Club
- Founded: 2012
- Ground: Stade Linité
- Capacity: 10,000
- Manager: Nichol Dogley
- League: Seychelles Division Two
- Website: https://www.facebook.com/Au-Cap-FC-169625407007377/

Au Cap FC is a Seychellois association football club based in Au Cap that currently competes in the Seychelles Division Two.

== History ==
Au Cap FC was promoted to the Seychelles First Division for the first time for the 2018 season. The club was relegated back to Division Two following the 2019–2020 season.
