= 2021–22 Wydad AC season =

Wydad AC
2021–22 season
- President: Said Naciri
- Manager: Walid Regragui
- Stadium: Stade Mohammed V
- Botola: 1st
- Throne Cup: Runners-up
- Champions League: Winners
- Top goalscorer: League: Guy Mbenza (16); All: Guy Mbenza (20)
- Biggest win: 6–1 vs Hearts of Oak (H)
- Biggest defeat: 0–2 vs Hassania Agadir (H); 0–2 vs Raja CA (A)
Home colours	Away colours	Third colours

The 2021–22 season was Wydad Athletic Club's 82nd season in existence and the club's 66th consecutive season in the top flight of Moroccan football. Wydad participated in this season's edition of the Botola, the Champions League and the Throne Cup. The season covered the period from 12 September 2021 to 28 July 2022.

== Players ==
=== First-team squad ===
Note: Flags indicate national team as defined under FIFA eligibility rules; some limited exceptions apply. Players may hold more than one non-FIFA nationality.

No.	Pos.	Nation	Player
1	GK	MAR	Yanis Henin
2	MF	MAR	Ayoub Skouma
3	DF	MAR	Achraf Dari
4	DF	MAR	Amine Aboulfath
5	MF	MAR	Yahya Jabrane (captain)
6	MF	MAR	Anas Serrhat
7	MF	MAR	Zouhair El Moutaraji
10	MF	MAR	Ayman El Hassouni
13	MF	MAR	Abdellah Haimoud
14	DF	MAR	Yahia Attiyat Allah
15	MF	MAR	Jalal Daoudi
16	DF	MAR	Hamza Asrir
17	FW	MAR	Badie Aouk
18	MF	MAR	Walid El Karti
19	MF	MAR	Reda Jaadi

No.	Pos.	Nation	Player
20	FW	MAR	Mohamed El Ouardi
22	DF	MAR	Ayoub El Amloud
24	DF	MAR	Mohamed Rahim
25	DF	MAR	Amine Farhane
26	GK	MAR	Ahmed Reda Tagnaouti
27	GK	MAR	Aissa Sioudi
28	FW	LBA	Muaid Ellafi
29	DF	CIV	Cheick Comara
30	FW	MAR	Chouaib Faidi
31	MF	MAR	Hamza Ait Allal
32	DF	MAR	Ayoub Benchaoui
34	FW	MAR	Salaheddine Benyachou
37	FW	MAR	Mounsef Chrachem
40	FW	CGO	Juvhel Tsoumou

== Transfers ==
=== In ===
Date	Position	Player	From	Transfer fee	Ref.
15 August 2021	FW	(Morocco) Reda Jaadi	Fath Union Sport	Undisclosed	
17 August 2021	FW	(Morocco) Chouaib Faidi	Étoile de Casablanca	Undisclosed	
27 August 2021	FW	(Morocco) Salaheddine Benyachou	Olympic Club de Safi	€300k	
30 August 2021	MF	(Morocco) Jalal Daoudi	–	Free transfer	
30 August 2021	FW	(Republic of the Congo) Juvhel Tsoumou	–	Free transfer	
14 September 2021	FW	(Republic of the Congo) Guy Mbenza	(Belgium) Royal Antwerp	Loan	

=== Out ===
Date	Position	Player	To	Transfer fee	Ref.
6 August 2021	FW	(Morocco) Mohamed Ounajem	(Egypt) Zamalek SC	Loan return	
11 August 2021	MF	(Morocco) Haitam El Bahja	Chabab Riadi Salmi	Free transfer	
12 August 2021	MF	(Morocco) Sofian El Moudane	RS Berkane	Undisclosed	
13 August 2021	MF	(Morocco) Salaheddine Saidi	–	End of contract	
20 August 2021	FW	(Morocco) Ayoub El Kaabi	(Turkey) Hatayspor	Free transfer	
21 August 2021	MF	(Morocco) Bilal Ziani Guennon	–	End of contract	
30 August 2021	DF	(Morocco) Ayoub Mouddane	Mouloudia Oujda	Loan	
3 September 2021	DF	(Morocco) Ibrahim Najm Eddine	Youssoufia Berrechid	Loan	
7 October 2021	MF	(Morocco) Walid El Karti	(Egypt) Pyramids FC	Undisclosed	
1 January 2022	FW	(Tanzania) Saimon Msuva	–	Free agent	
1 January 2022	DF	(Morocco) Zakaria Kiani	–	Free agent	
1 January 2022	DF	(Morocco) Badr Gaddarine	–	Free agent	
26 January 2022	DF	(Morocco) (Belgium) Soufiane Karkache	–	Free agent	
30 June 2022	FW	(Republic of the Congo) Guy Mbenza	(Belgium) Royal Antwerp	Loan return	

== Pre-season and friendlies ==
Win Draw Loss

22 August 2021	Wydad AC	1–0	Youssoufia Berrechid	Berkane
21:30 (UTC+1)	Karkache 52'	Report		Stadium: Stade Municipal de Berkane; Attendance: 0

25 August 2021	Racing de Casablanca	1–2	Wydad AC	Berkane
18:00 (UTC+1)	Bahja 41'	Report	El Karti 53'; El Ouardi 87'	Stadium: Stade Municipal de Berkane; Attendance: 0

28 August 2021	Wydad AC	1–1	RS Berkane	Berkane
21:30 (UTC+1)	Dayo 90' (o.g.)	Report	Zghoudi 57'	Stadium: Stade Municipal de Berkane; Attendance: 0

2 September 2021	Wydad AC (Morocco)	0–0	(Democratic Republic of the Congo) TP Mazembe	Berrechid
17:30 (UTC+1)		Report		Stadium: Stade Municipal de Berrechid; Attendance: 0

== Competitions ==
=== Overview ===
Competition	First match	Last match	Starting round	Final position	Record							
Competition	First match	Last match	Starting round	Final position	Pld	W	D	L	GF	GA	GD	Win %
Botola	12 September 2021	4 July 2022	Matchday 1	Winners	30	19	6	5	46	24	+22	63.33
Throne Cup	5 April 2022	28 July 2022	Round of 32	Runners-up	5	3	2	0	9	3	+6	60.00
Champions League	17 October 2021	30 May 2022	Second round	Winners	13	9	2	2	28	9	+19	69.23
Total					48	31	10	7	83	36	+47	64.58

Source: Competitions

=== Botola ===
==== League table ====
Pos	Team	Pld	W	D	L	GF	GA	GD	Pts	Qualification or relegation
1	Wydad AC (C)	30	19	6	5	46	24	+22	63	Qualification for Champions League (Note: Wydad AC and Raja CA are participated in the Arab Club Champions Cup group stage.)
2	Raja CA	30	17	9	4	41	21	+20	60	Qualification for Champions League
3	AS FAR	30	13	9	8	38	29	+9	48	Qualification for Confederation Cup (Note: AS FAR is participated in the Arab Club Champions Cup Qualifying round.)
4	Maghreb de Fès	30	9	18	3	28	17	+11	45	
5	Fath Union Sport	30	11	10	9	34	30	+4	43	

Source: FRMF.ma
Rules for classification: 1) Points; 2a) Head-to-head goal difference if they are two teams with equal points; 2b) Goal difference if they are more than two teams with equal points; 3) Number of wins; 4) Goals scored; 5) Play-off between involved teams.
(C) Champions

==== Results summary ====
Overall								Home						Away					
Pld	W	D	L	GF	GA	GD	Pts	W	D	L	GF	GA	GD	W	D	L	GF	GA	GD
30	19	6	5	46	24	+22	63	12	1	2	27	11	+16	7	5	3	19	13	+6

Source: Competitive matches

==== Results by round ====
Round	1	2	3	4	5	6	7	8	9	10	11	12	13	14	15	16	17	18	19	20	21	22	23	24	25	26	27	28	29	30
Ground	H	A	A	H	A	H	A	H	A	H	A	H	A	H	A	A	H	H	A	H	A	H	A	H	A	H	A	H	A	H
Result	W	W	W	W	D	W	W	W	W	D	W	W	L	W	L	D	W	L	D	W	W	W	D	W	L	W	W	W	D	L
Position	3	2	2	1	1	1	1	1	1	1	1	1	1	1	1	1	1	1	1	1	1	1	1	1	1	1	1	1	1	1

Source: Competitive matches
A = Away; H = Home; W = Win; D = Draw; L = Loss

==== Matches ====
12 September 2021 1	Wydad AC	2–0	Ittihad Tanger	Casablanca
17:00 (UTC+1)	Msuva 7'; Comara (yellow card) 21'; El Moutaraji 47'; Jabrane (yellow card) 60'; Daoudi (yellow card) 79'	Report	Laachir (yellow card) 33'	Stadium: Stade Mohammed V Attendance: 0 (Note: The match was played behind closed doors due to the COVID-19 pandemic in Morocco.); Referee: Nabil Benrkiya

19 September 2021 2	Rapide Oued Zem	0–2	Wydad AC	Khouribga
21:30 (UTC+1)	Lirki (yellow card) 64'	Report	El Moutaraji 51'; Mbenza 67'; Attiyat Allah (yellow card) 74'; Comara (yellow card) 90+2'	Stadium: Complexe OCP; Attendance: 0 Referee: Daki Reddad

26 September 2021 3	Hassania Agadir	0–1	Wydad AC	Agadir
19:15 (UTC+1)	Afsal (yellow card) 34'; Cheikhi (yellow card) 45+3'; Malo (yellow card) 51'	Report	Jaadi 21'; El Hassouni (yellow card) 64'; El Moutaraji (yellow card) 74'; Attiyat Allah (yellow card) 83'	Stadium: Stade Adrar; Attendance: 0 Referee: Nabil Benrkiya

29 September 2021 4	Wydad AC	3–2	Youssoufia Berrechid	Casablanca
16:00 (UTC+1)	Ait Allal (yellow card) 9'; Jabrane 11' (pen.); El Karti 41'; Mbenza 71'	Report	Fekkak 24'; Hachimi 64'; Buihamghet (yellow card) 69'	Stadium: Stade Larbi Zaouli; Attendance: 0 Referee: Hamza El Fariq

3 October 2021 5	SCC Mohammédia	0–0	Wydad AC	Mohammédia
21:30 (UTC+1)	Icharane (yellow card) 90'	Report	El Moutaraji (yellow card) 30'	Stadium: Stade El Bachir; Attendance: 0 (Note: The match was played behind closed doors due to the COVID-19 pandemic in Morocco.); Referee: Adil Zourak

21 October 2021 6	Wydad AC	1–0	Olympic Club de Safi	Casablanca
20:30 (UTC+1)	Rahim (yellow card) 44'; Daoudi (yellow card) 80'; Mbenza 87'; Ellafi (yellow card) 90+6'; El Hassouni (yellow card) 90+8'	Report		Stadium: Stade Mohammed V Attendance: 0 Referee: Yassine Bouslim

28 October 2021 7	AS FAR	0–1	Wydad AC	Rabat
18:15 (UTC+1)	Chibi (yellow card) 86'	Report	Haimoud (yellow card) 26'; Ellafi 61'; El Hassouni (yellow card) 82'; Dari (yellow card) 90+2'; Tsoumou (yellow card) 90+5'	Stadium: Prince Moulay Abdellah Stadium; Attendance: 0 Referee: Daki Reddad

31 October 2021 8	Wydad AC	1–0	Maghreb de Fès	Casablanca
18:15 (UTC+1)	Jabrane (yellow card) 38' (yellow-red card) 84'; Mbenza 87'; El Hassouni (yellow card) 89'	Report	Yechou (yellow card) 44'; Bouhra (yellow card) 89'	Stadium: Stade Mohammed V Attendance: 0 Referee: Nabil Benrqia

3 November 2021 9	Olympique Club de Khouribga	0–3	Wydad AC	Khouribga
20:30 (UTC+1)	Seakanyeng (yellow card) 9'; Marsile (yellow card) 52'; Hajjar (yellow card) 87'	Report	Msuva 17', 74'; Serrhat (yellow card) 21'; Aboulfath (yellow card) 60'; Mbenza 68'	Stadium: Complexe OCP; Attendance: 0 Referee: Adil Zourak

6 November 2021 10	Wydad AC	1–1	Raja CA	Casablanca
17:00 (UTC+1)	Jabrane (yellow card) 30'; El Hassouni (yellow card) 36'; Ellafi (yellow card) 41'; Daoudi (yellow card) 64'; Benyachou 77'	Report	Nahiri (yellow card) 30'; Hadhoudi 79'	Stadium: Stade Mohammed V Attendance: 0 Referee: Karim Sabry

19 November 2021 11	Jeunesse Sportive Soualem	3–4	Wydad AC	Zemamra
16:00 (UTC+1)	El Allouch (yellow card) 21'; Benlamachi 31'; Njima (yellow card) 43'; Fryi (yellow card) 45+2'; El Bahja 76' (pen.), 86' (pen.)	Report	Dari 15'; Daoudi 22'; Mbenza 51', 73'; Attiyat Allah (yellow card) 64'; Aouk (yellow card) 90+3'	Stadium: Stade Ahmed Choukri; Attendance: 0 Referee: Redouane Jiyed

23 November 2021 12	Wydad AC	2–0	RS Berkane	Casablanca
16:00 (UTC+1)	Ellafi 6'; Benyachou (yellow card) 26'; Daoudi (yellow card) 79'; Mbenza 90+3'	Report	El Helali (yellow card) 84'	Stadium: Stade Mohammed V Attendance: 0 Referee: Nabil Benrqia

18 December 2021 13	Difaâ Hassani El Jadidi	2–1	Wydad AC	El Jadida
16:00 (UTC+1)	Hadraf 15'; Al Gaadaoui 39'; Sawadogo (yellow card) 52'; Barrouhou (yellow card) 90+2'	Report	Benyachou (yellow card) 36'; Aboulfath (yellow card) 38'; Ait Allal (yellow card) 45+1'; Attiyat Allah 80'	Stadium: Stade El Abdi; Attendance: 0 Referee: Mohamed Nhiyeh

24 December 2021 14	Wydad AC	3–2	MC Oujda	Casablanca
16:00 (UTC+1)	Jabrane (yellow card) 20'; Benyachou 22'; Mbenza 29'; Dari 55'; Aboulfath (yellow card) 70'; Daoudi (yellow card) 90'	Report	Anouar 27'; Lemzaouri (yellow card) 45+3'; Bettache 78'	Stadium: Stade Mohammed V Attendance: 0 Referee: Jamal Belbasri

28 December 2021 15	Fath Union Sport	3–2	Wydad AC	Rabat
20:30 (UTC+1)	Karnass 54'; Hajhouj 58'; Ramzi (yellow card) 64'; Lahtimi 90+3', (yellow card) 90+4'	Report	Jabrane (yellow card) 45+1'; Attiyat Allah (yellow card) 67'; Mbenza 79', 86'; Farhane (yellow card) 82'	Stadium: Stade Belvédère; Attendance: 0 Referee: Adil Zourak

5 February 2022 16	Ittihad Tanger	0–0	Wydad AC	Tangier
16:00 UTC+1	Abd El Mouttalib (yellow card) 22'; El Ouahabi (yellow card) 61'; Hamoudan (yellow card) 68'	Report	Farhane (yellow card) 27'; El Hassouni (yellow card) 49'; Comara (yellow card) 80'; Tsoumou (yellow card) 90+5'	Stadium: Stade Ibn Batouta; Attendance: 0 Referee: Yassine Bouslim

15 February 2022 17	Wydad AC	2–0	Rapide Oued Zem	Casablanca
18:15 UTC+1	El Hassouni 67'; Comara (yellow card) 84'; Ellafi 90+3'	Report	Nekkab (yellow card) 71'; Chitou (yellow card) 77'	Stadium: Stade Mohammed V Attendance: 0 Referee: Nabil Benrqia

23 February 2022 18	Wydad AC	0–2	Hassania Agadir	Casablanca
20:00 UTC+1	El Hassouni (yellow card) 32'	Report	Mehri 10'; Cisse 43'	Stadium: Stade Mohammed V Attendance: 0 Referee: Mohamed Nhiyeh

1 March 2022 19	Youssoufia Berrechid	0–0	Wydad AC	Berrechid
18:15 UTC+1	Chihab (yellow card) 81'; Ait Ahmed (yellow card) 90+2' (yellow-red card) 90+7'	Report	Jabrane (yellow card) 82'; Dari (yellow card) 90+3'; Tagnaouti (yellow card) 90+7'	Stadium: Stade Municipal de Berrechid; Referee: Mohamed Bellote

5 March 2022 20	Wydad AC	2–1	SCC Mohammédia	Casablanca
18:15 UTC+1	El Amloud (yellow card) 8'; Jaadi 62'; Ellafi 72'	Report	El Wasti (yellow card) 27'; Baouch (yellow card) 42'; Akono 85'	Stadium: Stade Mohammed V Referee: Rédouane Jiyed

26 April 2022 21	Olympic Club de Safi	0–1	Wydad AC	Safi
22:00 UTC+0	Claudio (yellow card) 41'; Belaidi (yellow card) 75'	Report	El Hassouni 84' (pen.); Tsoumou (yellow card) 88'	Stadium: Stade El Massira; Referee: Hamza El Fariq

29 April 2022 22	Wydad AC	3–0	ASFAR	Casablanca
22:00 UTC+0	Mbenza 25'; Jabrane 90+3' (pen.); Haimoud 90+5'	Report	Tarkhatt (red card) 8'; Chibi (yellow card) 16'; Ennaffati (yellow card) 89'	Stadium: Stade Mohammed V Referee: Hicham Tamsamani

18 May 2022 23	Maghreb de Fès	1–1	Wydad AC	Fez
18:15 UTC+1	El Janati 18'; Rami (yellow card) 81'; Majid (yellow card) 90+1'	Report	Haimoud 4'	Stadium: Fez Stadium; Referee: Yassine Bouslim

22 May 2022 24	Wydad AC	1–0	Olympique Club de Khouribga	Casablanca
18:15 UTC+1	Tsoumou 55'; Jabrane (yellow card) 82'	Report	Hafari (yellow card) 37'; Orebonye (yellow card) 45+3'	Stadium: Stade Mohammed V Referee: Samir Guezzaz

16 June 2022 25	Raja CA	2–0	Wydad AC	Casablanca
17:00 UTC+1	Arjoune (yellow card) 16'; Moutaouali 45+3' (pen.), 86' (pen.), (red card) 87'; Hadhoudi (yellow card) 54'; Zrida (yellow card) 56'; Ahadad (yellow card) 74'; Nahiri (yellow card) 80'	Report	El Hassouni (yellow card) 13'; Jaadi (yellow card) 56'; Tagnaouti (yellow card) 89'; Tsoumou (red card) 89'	Stadium: Stade Mohammed V Attendance: 0 Referee: Rédouane Jiyed

19 June 2022 26	Wydad AC	3–0	Jeunesse Sportive Soualem	Casablanca
19:15 UTC+1	Mbenza 9'; Rahim (yellow card) 60'; Jabrane 61' (pen.); Aouk 76'; Chrachem (yellow card) 90+5'	Report	Sillah (yellow card) 60'	Stadium: Stade Mohammed V Referee: Daki Reddad

22 June 2022 27	RS Berkane	0–1	Wydad AC	Berkane
19:15 UTC+1	El Helali (yellow card) 90'; El Ouaad (yellow card) 90+6'	Report	Farhane (yellow card) 3'; Haimoud (yellow card) 35'; Daoudi (yellow card) 90'; Mbenza 90+14'	Stadium: Stade Municipal de Berkane; Referee: Samir Guezzaz
Note: The match was stopped due to power outage in the stadium area.

25 June 2022 28	Wydad AC	2–1	Difaâ Hassani El Jadidi	Casablanca
20:30 UTC+1	Mbenza 45+4'; El Amloud (yellow card) 57'; El Hassouni (yellow card) 64'; Farhane 79'	Report	Juma 6', (yellow card) 37'; Amale (yellow card) 64'; Al Gaadaoui (yellow card) 83'; El Maftoul (yellow card) 83'	Stadium: Stade Mohammed V Referee: Hicham Tamsamani

29 June 2022 29	MC Oujda	2–2	Wydad AC	Oujda
18:00 UTC+1	Diakite 6', 33'; Amri (yellow card) 77'; Lemzaouri (yellow card) 90'	Report	Jaadi (yellow card) 24'; Mbenza 51'; Tsoumou 90+1'	Stadium: Honneur Stadium; Referee: Hamza El Fariq

4 July 2022 30	Wydad AC	1–2	Fath Union Sport	Casablanca
18:00 UTC+1	Comara 29'	Report	Lahtimi 71' (pen.), 72'	Stadium: Stade Mohammed V Referee: Nabil Benrqia

=== Moroccan Throne Cup ===
5 April 2022 Round of 32	Club Ittifaq Sportif Marrakech	1–4	Wydad AC	Marrakesh
22:00 UTC+0	Ben-Dellal 14'	Report	Jabrane 3' (pen.); Mbenza 18'; El Amloud 40'; Tsoumou 90+4'	Stadium: Stade de Marrakech; Referee: Yassine Bouslim

9 April 2022 Round of 16	Wydad AC	3–2	SCC Mohammédia	Casablanca
22:00 UTC+0	El Hassouni 30', 67'; Daoudi 82'	Report	Lamlioui 61' (pen.); Moutaraji 74'	Stadium: Stade Mohammed V Referee: Rédouane Jiyed

7 July 2022 Quarter-finals	Wydad AC	2–0	Raja CA	Casablanca
18:00 UTC+1	Attiyat Allah 9'; El Moutaraji 62'	Report		Stadium: Stade Larbi Zaouli; Attendance: 0 Referee: Jalal Jayid

20 July 2022 Semi-finals	Wydad AC	0–0 (a.e.t.) (5–4 p)	Fath Union Sport	Fez
20:00 UTC+1		Report		Stadium: Fez Stadium; Referee: Mohamed Nhiyeh
	Penalties
	Jabrane (penalty scored); Attiyat Allah (penalty scored); Tsoumou (penalty scored); Daoudi (penalty scored); El Hassouni (penalty scored)		(penalty missed) Raoui; (penalty scored) El Moubarik; (penalty scored) Kameni; (penalty scored) Limouri; (penalty scored) Benarif

28 July 2022 Final	Wydad AC	0–0 (a.e.t.) (2–3 p)	RS Berkane	Rabat
20:00 UTC+1		Report		Stadium: Prince Moulay Abdellah Stadium; Referee: Redouane Jiyed
	Penalties
	El Moutaraji (penalty missed); Attiyat Allah (penalty missed); Tsoumou (penalty scored); El Amloud (penalty scored); El Hassouni (penalty missed)		(penalty scored) El Moussaoui; (penalty scored) Naji; (penalty missed) El Fahli; (penalty scored) El Moudane

=== CAF Champions League ===
==== Qualifying rounds ====
===== Second round =====
17 October 2021 First leg	Hearts of Oak (Ghana)	1–0	(Morocco) Wydad AC	Accra, Ghana
15:00 UTC+0	Mensah 41'; Ansah (yellow card) 66'; Nettey (yellow card) 85'	Report	El Hassouni (yellow card) 45'	Stadium: Accra Sports Stadium; Attendance: 2,000; Referee: Helder Martins de Carvalho (Angola)

24 October 2021 Second leg	Wydad AC (Morocco)	6–1 (6–2 agg.)	(Ghana) Hearts of Oak	Casablanca, Morocco
20:00 UTC+1	Msuva 4', 61'; El Hassouni 8'; Dari 20'; Jabrane 38' (pen.); El Amloud 49'	Report	Boateng (yellow card) 52'; Nettey (yellow card) 76'; Afriyie (yellow card) 80'; Razak 84'; Kordzi (yellow card) 66'	Stadium: Stade Mohammed V Attendance: 0 Referee: Eric Otogo-Castane (Gabon)

==== Group stage ====
===== Group D =====
Pos	Team	Pld	W	D	L	GF	GA	GD	Pts	Qualification	WAC	PET	ZAM	SAG
1	(Morocco) Wydad AC	6	5	0	1	15	5	+10	15	Advance to knockout stage	—	5–1	3–1	3–0
2	(Angola) Petro de Luanda	6	3	2	1	9	8	+1	11	Advance to knockout stage	2–1	—	0–0	3–0
3	(Egypt) Zamalek	6	0	4	2	3	6	−3	4		0–1	2–2	—	0–0
4	(Angola) Sagrada Esperança	6	0	2	4	1	9	−8	2		1–2	0–1	0–0	—

Source: CAF
Rules for classification: Group stage tiebreakers

11 February 2022 Matchday 1	Wydad AC (Morocco)	3–0	(Angola) Sagrada Esperança	Casablanca, Morocco
20:00 UTC+1	Dari 45+2'; Jabrane 52' (pen.), (yellow card) 90+1'; Mbenza 72'; Tsoumou (yellow card) 87'	Report	Paciência (yellow card) 41'; Lucoquessa (yellow card) 49'; Carlinhos (yellow card) 50'	Stadium: Stade Mohammed V Attendance: 0 Referee: Daniel Nii Laryea (Ghana)

19 February 2022 Matchday 2	Petro de Luanda (Angola)	2–1	(Morocco) Wydad AC	Luanda, Angola
14:00 UTC+1	Azulão 41'; Yano 68'; Carneiro (yellow card) 84'; Cruz (yellow card) 90+1'	Report	Jabrane (yellow card) 16'; Jaadi (yellow card) 40'; Daoudi (yellow card) 48', (goal) 59'; Farhane (yellow card) 90'	Stadium: Estádio 11 de Novembro; Referee: Peter Waweru (Kenya)

26 February 2022 Matchday 3	Wydad AC (Morocco)	3–1	(Egypt) Zamalek	Casablanca, Morocco
20:00 UTC+1	El Moutaraji 27'; Farhane 37'; El Hassouni (yellow card) 86'; Jabrane 88'; Tsoumou (yellow card) 90'	Report	Zizo 3', (yellow card) 80'; Obama (yellow card) 10'; Mathlouthi (yellow card) 24'; Emam (yellow card) 86'	Stadium: Stade Mohammed V Attendance: 40,000; Referee: Sadok Selmi (Tunisia)

11 March 2022 Matchday 4	Zamalek (Egypt)	0–1	(Morocco) Wydad AC	Cairo, Egypt
18:00 UTC+2	Hamdy (yellow card) 27'; Zizo (yellow card) 45+6'; Alaa (yellow card) 51'	Report	Daoudi (yellow card) 36'; Jabrane (yellow card) 44', (goal) 48' (pen.); El Hassouni (yellow card) 44'; Tagnaouti (yellow card) 90+4'	Stadium: Cairo International Stadium; Attendance: 5,000; Referee: Pacifique Ndabihawenimana (Burundi)

19 March 2022 Matchday 5	Sagrada Esperança (Angola)	1–2	(Morocco) Wydad AC	Luanda (Note: Sagrada Esperança play their group stage home matches at Estádio 11 de Novembro, Luanda, instead of their regular home stadium Estádio Sagrada Esperança, Dundo, which did not meet CAF requirements.), Angola
20:00 UTC+1	Paciência 30', (yellow card) 31'; Gerson (yellow card) 79'	Report	El Moutaraji 82'; Tsoumou 90+5'	Stadium: Estádio 11 de Novembro; Referee: Mahmood Ismail (Sudan)

2 April 2022 Matchday 6	Wydad AC (Morocco)	5–1	(Angola) Petro de Luanda	Casablanca, Morocco
21:00 UTC+0	Tsoumou 11'; Dari 29'; El Moutaraji 32', (yellow card) 43'; El Hassouni 56', (yellow card) 56'; Ellafi 71', (yellow card) 72'; Rahim (yellow card) 83'	Report	Francisco (yellow card) 43'; Balanga (yellow card) 53'; Pinto 63'	Stadium: Stade Mohammed V Attendance: 40,000; Referee: Lahlou Benbraham (Algeria)

==== Knockout stage ====
===== Quarter-finals =====
16 April 2022 First leg	CR Belouizdad (Algeria)	0–1	(Morocco) Wydad AC	Algiers (Note: CR Belouizdad play their group stage home matches at Stade du 5 Juillet, Algiers, instead of their regular home stadium Stade du 20 Août, Algiers, which did not meet CAF requirements.), Algeria
22:00 UTC+1	Aribi (yellow card) 85'	Report	Daoudi (red card) 7'; Mbenza 46'; Tagnaouti (yellow card) 90+1'	Stadium: Stade du 5 Juillet; Attendance: 30,000; Referee: Pacifique Ndabihawenimana (Burundi)

23 April 2022 Second leg	Wydad AC (Morocco)	0–0 (1–0 agg.)	(Algeria) CR Belouizdad	Casablanca, Morocco
22:00 UTC+0	Farhane (yellow card) 62'; Ellafi (yellow card) 86'	Report	Nessakh (yellow card) 46'; Aribi (yellow card) 56'; Draoui (yellow card) 65'; Moussaoui (red card) 89'	Stadium: Stade Mohammed V Attendance: 40,000; Referee: Amin Omar (Egypt)

===== Semi-finals =====
7 May 2022 First leg	Petro de Luanda (Angola)	1–3	(Morocco) Wydad AC	Luanda, Angola
14:00 UTC+1	Moreira (yellow card) 45+2'; Soares (yellow card) 67' (yellow-red card) 90+1'; Job 81'	Report	Azulão 16' (o.g.); Jabrane 45', (yellow card) 67'; Aouk (yellow card) 54'; Mbenza 68'; Haimoud (yellow card) 77'; Rahim (yellow card) 90+1'	Stadium: Estádio 11 de Novembro; Attendance: 35,000; Referee: Mustapha Ghorbal (Algeria)

13 May 2022 Second leg	Wydad AC (Morocco)	1–1 (4–2 agg.)	(Angola) Petro de Luanda	Casablanca, Morocco
20:00 UTC+1	Farhane 28'; Jabrane (yellow card) 60'; Attiyat Allah (yellow card) 69'; Dari (yellow card) 72'; Jaadi (yellow card) 86'	Report	Gleison 21'; Canji (yellow card) 72'; Miguel (yellow card) 75'; Castro (yellow card) 89'; Job (yellow card) 90+5'; Yano (red card) 90+5'	Stadium: Stade Mohammed V Attendance: 30,000; Referee: Victor Gomes (South Africa)

===== Final =====
30 May 2022 Final	Al Ahly (Egypt)	0–2	(Morocco) Wydad AC	Casablanca, Morocco
20:00 UTC+1	Dieng (yellow card) 56'; Rabia (red card) 90+2'	Report	El Moutaraji 15', 48'; Farhane (yellow card) 44'	Stadium: Stade Mohammed V Attendance: 45,000; Referee: Victor Gomes (South Africa)

== Squad statistics ==
=== Appearances and goals ===
No.	Pos	Nat	Player	Total		Botola		Throne Cup		Champions League	
No.	Pos	Nat	Player	Apps	Goals	Apps	Goals	Apps	Goals	Apps	Goals
Goalkeepers
1	GK	(Morocco) MAR	Yanis Henin	0	0	0	0	0	0	0	0
12	GK	(Morocco) MAR	Taha Mourid	1	0	1	0	0	0	0	0
26	GK	(Morocco) MAR	Ahmed Reda Tagnaouti	45	0	27	0	5	0	13	0
27	GK	(Morocco) MAR	Aissa Sioudi	2	0	2	0	0	0	0	0
Defenders
3	DF	(Morocco) MAR	Achraf Dari	42	5	26	2	3	0	13	3
4	DF	(Morocco) MAR	Amine Aboulfath	2	0	2	0	0	0	0	0
14	DF	(Morocco) MAR	Yahia Attiyat Allah	40	2	21+3	1	3	1	13	0
16	DF	(Morocco) MAR	Hamza Asrir	4	0	1+2	0	1	0	0	0
22	DF	(Morocco) MAR	Ayoub El Amloud	37	2	19+2	0	5	1	11	1
24	DF	(Morocco) MAR	Mohamed Rahim	16	0	6+2	0	2	0	2+4	0
25	DF	(Morocco) MAR	Amine Farhane	26	3	11+3	1	4	0	7+1	2
29	DF	(Ivory Coast) CIV	Cheick Comara	18	0	16	0	2	0	0	0
31	DF	(Morocco) MAR	Hamza Ait Allal	10	0	7+1	0	0	0	0+2	0
Midfielders
5	MF	(Morocco) MAR	Yahya Jabrane	41	9	23+2	3	4	1	12	5
6	MF	(Morocco) MAR	Anas Serrhat	32	0	5+13	0	1	0	4+9	0
10	MF	(Morocco) MAR	Ayman El Hassouni	43	6	24+3	2	4	2	11+1	2
13	MF	(Morocco) MAR	Abdellah Haimoud	31	2	15+6	2	3	0	3+4	0
15	MF	(Morocco) MAR	Jalal Daoudi	36	3	18+7	1	3	1	8	1
19	MF	(Morocco) MAR	Reda Jaadi	29	2	13+5	2	3	0	8	0
Forwards
7	FW	(Morocco) MAR	Zouhair El Moutaraji	30	8	13+3	2	5	1	9	5
17	FW	(Morocco) MAR	Badie Aouk	28	1	7+13	1	2	0	2+4	0
20	FW	(Morocco) MAR	Mohamed El Ouardi	6	0	1+3	0	0	0	0+2	0
28	FW	(Libya) LBA	Muaid Ellafi	28	5	9+8	4	1	0	8+2	1
30	FW	(Morocco) MAR	Chouaib Faidi	1	0	0+1	0	0	0	0	0
34	FW	(Morocco) MAR	Salaheddine Benyachou	31	2	9+14	2	1	0	2+5	0
37	FW	(Morocco) MAR	Mounsef Chrachem	22	0	5+11	0	1	0	1+4	0
40	FW	(Republic of the Congo) CGO	Juvhel Tsoumou	36	5	4+19	2	1+1	1	1+10	2
Players transferred/loaned out during the season
8	DF	(Morocco) MAR	Badr Gaddarine	5	0	3+1	0	0	0	0+1	0
9	FW	(Republic of the Congo) CGO	Guy Mbenza	41	20	20+8	16	2	1	9+2	3
11	FW	(Tanzania) TAN	Saimon Msuva	11	5	9	3	0	0	2	2
18	MF	(Morocco) MAR	Walid El Karti	4	1	1+3	1	0	0	0	0

Source: Soccerway

=== Goalscorers ===
Rank	Pos.	Nat.	Name	Botola	Throne Cup	Champions League	Total
1	FW	(Republic of the Congo)	Guy Mbenza	16	1	3	20
2	MF	(Morocco)	Yahya Jabrane	3	1	5	9
3	FW	(Morocco)	Zouhair El Moutaraji	2	1	5	8
4	MF	(Morocco)	Ayman El Hassouni	2	2	2	6
5	DF	(Morocco)	Achraf Dari	2	0	3	5
5	MF	(Libya)	Muaid Ellafi	4	0	1	5
5	FW	(Tanzania)	Saimon Msuva	3	0	2	5
8	FW	(Republic of the Congo)	Juvhel Tsoumou	2	1	2	5
9	MF	(Morocco)	Jalal Daoudi	1	1	1	3
9	MF	(Morocco)	Amine Farhane	1	0	2	3
11	FW	(Morocco)	Salaheddine Benyachou	2	0	0	2
11	MF	(Morocco)	Reda Jaadi	2	0	0	2
11	DF	(Morocco)	Ayoub El Amloud	0	1	1	2
11	MF	(Morocco)	Abdellah Haimoud	2	0	0	2
11	DF	(Morocco)	Yahia Attiyat Allah	1	1	0	2
16	MF	(Morocco)	Walid El Karti	1	0	0	1
16	FW	(Morocco)	Badie Aouk	1	0	0	1
18	DF	(Ivory Coast)	Cheick Comara	1	0	0	1
Own goals				0	0	1	1
Totals				46	9	28	83

*Italic: Left the team.

=== Clean sheets ===
Rank	No.	Pos.	Nat.	Player	Botola	Throne Cup	CAF Champions League	Total
1	26	GK	(Morocco)	Ahmed Reda Tagnaouti	16	3	5	24
2	27	GK	(Morocco)	Aissa Sioudi	0	0	0	0
2	12	GK	(Morocco)	Taha Mourid	0	0	0	0
Totals					16	3	5	24

=== Disciplinary record ===
No.	Pos.	Nat.	Player	Botola		Throne Cup		CAF Champions League		Total	
No.	Pos.	Nat.	Player	Yellow card	Red card	Yellow card	Red card	Yellow card	Red card	Yellow card	Red card
3	DF	(Morocco)	Achraf Dari	0	0	0	0	1	0	1	0
4	DF	(Morocco)	Amine Aboulfath	3	0	0	0	0	0	3	0
5	MF	(Morocco)	Yahya Jabrane	8	1	0	0	5	0	13	1
6	MF	(Morocco)	Anas Serrhat	1	0	0	0	0	0	1	0
7	FW	(Morocco)	Zouhair El Moutaraji	2	0	0	0	1	0	3	0
10	MF	(Morocco)	Ayman El Hassouni	8	0	0	0	4	0	12	0
13	MF	(Morocco)	Abdellah Haimoud	2	0	0	0	1	0	3	0
14	DF	(Morocco)	Yahia Attiyat Allah	4	0	0	0	1	0	5	0
15	MF	(Morocco)	Jalal Daoudi	7	0	0	0	2	1	9	1
17	FW	(Morocco)	Badie Aouk	1	0	0	0	1	0	2	0
19	MF	(Morocco)	Reda Jaadi	2	0	0	0	2	0	4	0
22	DF	(Morocco)	Ayoub El Amloud	2	0	0	0	0	0	2	0
24	DF	(Morocco)	Mohamed Rahim	2	0	0	0	2	0	4	0
25	DF	(Morocco)	Amine Farhane	4	0	0	0	3	0	7	0
26	GK	(Morocco)	Ahmed Reda Tagnaouti	2	0	0	0	3	0	5	0
28	FW	(Libya)	Muaid Ellafi	2	0	0	0	2	0	4	0
29	DF	(Ivory Coast)	Cheick Comara	4	0	0	0	0	0	4	0
31	DF	(Morocco)	Hamza Ait Allal	2	0	0	0	0	0	2	0
34	FW	(Morocco)	Salaheddine Benyachou	2	0	0	0	0	0	2	0
37	FW	(Morocco)	Mounsef Chrachem	1	0	0	0	0	0	1	0
49	FW	(Republic of the Congo)	Juvhel Tsoumou	3	1	0	0	2	0	5	1
Players transferred/loaned out during the season
Totals				0	0	0	0	0	0	4	3
