= 2020–21 Wydad AC season =

Wydad AC
2020–21 season
- President: Said Naciri
- Manager: Faouzi Benzarti
- Stadium: Stade Mohammed V
- Botola: 1st
- Throne Cup: Semi-finals
- Champions League: Semi-finals
- Top goalscorer: League: Ayoub El Kaabi (18); All: Ayoub El Kaabi (26)
- Highest home attendance: 0 (Note: no one can attend games due to the COVID-19 pandemic)
- Lowest home attendance: 0 (Note: no one can attend games due to the COVID-19 pandemic)
- Average home league attendance: 0 (Note: no one can attend games due to the COVID-19 pandemic)
- Biggest win: 4–0 vs Kaizer Chiefs; 4–0 vs RS Berkane; 4–0 vs SCC Mohammédia
- Biggest defeat: 2–4 vs Ittihad Tanger
Home colours	Away colours	Third colours

The 2020–21 season is Wydad AC's 81st season in their existence and the club's 65th consecutive season in the top flight of Moroccan football. Wydad participated in this season's edition of the Botola, the Champions League and the Throne Cup.

== Players ==
=== First-team squad ===
Note: Flags indicate national team as defined under FIFA eligibility rules; some limited exceptions apply. Players may hold more than one non-FIFA nationality.

No.	Pos.	Nation	Player
1	GK	MAR	Yanis Henin
2	MF	MAR	Ayoub Skouma
3	DF	MAR	Achraf Dari
4	MF	MAR	Salaheddine Saidi
5	MF	MAR	Yahya Jabrane
6	MF	MAR	Anas Serrhat
7	FW	MAR	Mohamed Ounajem
8	DF	MAR	Badr Gaddarine
9	FW	MAR	Ayoub El Kaabi
11	FW	TAN	Simon Msuva
14	DF	MAR	Yahia Attiyat Allah
15	DF	MAR	Ayoub Benchaoui
16	DF	MAR	Hamza Asrir
17	FW	MAR	Badie Aouk
18	MF	MAR	Walid El Karti
19	MF	FRA	Sofian El Moudane

No.	Pos.	Nation	Player
20	FW	MAR	Ayman El Hassouni
21	DF	MAR	Soufiane Karkache
22	DF	MAR	Ayoub El Amloud
23	DF	MAR	Zakaria Kiani
24	DF	MAR	Mohamed Rahim
26	GK	MAR	Ahmed Reda Tagnaouti
27	GK	MAR	Aissa Sioudi
28	FW	LBA	Muaid Ellafi
29	DF	CIV	Cheick Comara
30	DF	MAR	Amine Aboulfath
31	MF	MAR	Hamza Ait Allal
32	FW	MAR	Mounsef Chrachem
37	FW	MAR	Zouhair El Moutaraji
38	MF	MAR	Abdellah Haimoud
40	FW	MAR	Mohamed El Ouardi

== Transfers ==
=== In ===
Date	Pos	Player	From club	Transfer fee	Source
24 September 2020	FW	(Morocco) Ayoub El Kaabi	Hebei China Fortune	Free transfer	
24 September 2020	AM / LW	(Libya) Muaid Ellafi	(Algeria) USM Alger	Free transfer	
28 October 2020	MF	(Morocco) Ayoub Skouma	FUS Rabat	Undisclosed	
6 November 2020	MF	(Morocco) Sofian El Moudane	Ittihad Tanger	Swap	
10 October 2020	MF	(Morocco) Anas Serrhat	Renaissance Zemamra	Undisclosed	
10 October 2020	DF	(Morocco) Zakaria Kiani	Renaissance Zemamra	Undisclosed	
3 November 2020	DF	(Morocco) Amine Aboulfath	Youssoufia Berrechid	Undisclosed	
7 November 2020	DF	(Morocco) Amine Farhane	Widad Témara	Undisclosed	
11 November 2020	FW	(Tanzania) Simon Msuva	Difaâ El Jadida	Undisclosed	
13 November 2020	DF	(Morocco) Ayoub Benchaoui	Difaâ El Jadida	Undisclosed	
17 November 2020	MF	(Morocco) Hamza Ait Allal	Rapide Oued Zem	Undisclosed	
30 November 2020	DF	(Morocco) Mohamed Rahim	SCC Mohammédia	€230k	
16 January 2021	RW	(Morocco) Mounsef Chrachem	Chabab Atlas Khénifra	€200k	
31 January 2021	RW	(Morocco) Mohamed Ounajem	(Egypt) Zamalek SC	Loan	
1 February 2021	MF	(Morocco) Bilal Ziani Guennon	(Spain) Atlético Albacete	Undisclosed	

=== Out ===
Date	Pos	Player	To club	Transfer fee	Source
30 June 2020	DF	(Morocco) Mohamed Nahiri	–	End of contract	
13 September 2020	RW	(Morocco) Amin Tighazoui	–	End of contract	
15 September 2020	DF	(Morocco) Adil Rhaili	(Greece) Apollon Smyrnis	Free transfer	
28 October 2020	DF	(Morocco) Brahim Nekkach	Renaissance Zemamra	End of contract	
1 November 2020	MF	(Morocco) Ismail Moutaraji	SCC Mohammédia	Undisclosed	
3 November 2020	DF	(Ivory Coast) Mohamed Ouattara	(Sudan) Al-Hilal Club	Undisclosed	
6 November 2020	DF	(Morocco) Anas El Asbahi	Ittihad Tanger	Swap	
15 November 2020	MF	(Morocco) Mohamed Kamal	Moghreb Tétouan	Undisclosed	
15 November 2020	ST	(Morocco) Ismail El Haddad	(Qatar) Al-Khor SC	€1.67m	
24 November 2020	DF	(Morocco) Youssef Chaina	Youssoufia Berrechid	Free transfer	
26 November 2020	FW	(Democratic Republic of the Congo) Kazadi Kasengu	(Egypt) Al Masry SC	$260k	
29 November 2020	MF	(Morocco) Haytham El Bahja	Chabab Riadi Salmi	Loan	
30 November 2020	DF	(Morocco) Ayoub Mouddane	Olympique Safi	Loan	
4 February 2021	ST	(Ivory Coast) Gbagbo Junior Magbi	(Saudi Arabia) Al-Tai FC	Loan	
5 February 2021	DF	(Morocco) Abdelatif Noussir	Moghreb Tétouan	Free transfer	
9 February 2021	DF	(Morocco) Ibrahim Najm Eddine	Difaâ El Jadida	Loan	
1 July 2021	ST	(Nigeria) Michael Babatunde	–	End of contract	

== Competitions ==
=== Overview ===
Competition	Record								Started round	Final position / round	First match	Last match
Competition	G	W	D	L	GF	GA	GD	Win %	Started round	Final position / round	First match	Last match
Botola	30	20	7	3	58	26	+32	66.67	Matchday 1	Winners	6 December 2020	28 July 2021
Throne Cup	4	3	1	0	11	3	+8	75.00	Round of 32	Semi-finals	30 December 2020	1 August 2021
Champions League	12	6	3	3	14	4	+10	50.00	First round	Semi-finals	23 December 2020	26 June 2021
Total	46	29	11	6	83	33	+50	63.04				

Source: Competitions

== League table ==
Pos	Team	Pld	W	D	L	GF	GA	GD	Pts	Qualification or relegation
1	Wydad AC (C)	30	20	7	3	58	26	+32	67	Qualification for Champions League
2	Raja CA	30	17	8	5	48	26	+22	59	Qualification for Champions League
3	AS FAR	30	14	9	7	39	29	+10	51	Qualification for Confederation Cup
4	RS Berkane	30	13	6	11	37	36	+1	45	Qualification for Confederation Cup
5	Mouloudia Oujda	30	12	6	12	38	35	+3	42	

Source: FRMF.ma
Rules for classification: 1) Points; 2a) Head-to-head goal difference if they are two teams with equal points; 2b) Goal difference if they are more than two teams with equal points; 3) Number of wins; 4) Goals scored; 5) Play-off between involved teams.
(C) Champions

=== Results summary ===
Overall								Home						Away					
Pld	W	D	L	GF	GA	GD	Pts	W	D	L	GF	GA	GD	W	D	L	GF	GA	GD
30	20	7	3	58	26	+32	67	11	3	1	35	13	+22	9	4	2	23	13	+10

Source: Competitive matches

=== Results by round ===
Round	1	2	3	4	5	6	7	8	9	10	11	12	13	14	15	16	17	18	19	20	21	22	23	24	25	26	27	28	29	30
Ground	H	A	A	H	A	H	A	H	A	H	A	H	A	H	A	A	H	H	A	H	A	H	A	H	A	H	A	H	A	H
Result	W	W	L	W	W	W	W	W	D	W	W	D	L	D	D	W	W	W	W	W	D	D	W	W	W	W	W	L	D	W
Position	3	2	5	3	2	1	1	1	2	1	1	1	1	1	1	1	1	1	1	1	1	1	1	1	1	1	1	1	1	1

Source: Competitive matches
A = Away; H = Home; W = Win; D = Draw; L = Loss

=== Matches ===
Unless otherwise noted, all times in WAT
Win Draw Loss

6 December 2020 Round 1	Wydad AC	2–0	Youssoufia Berrechid	Casablanca
17:30	Oggadi 23' (o.g.); Attiyat Allah (yellow card) 55', (goal) 77'; Gaddarine (yellow card) 86'	Report	Oggadi (yellow card) 37' (yellow-red card) 53'	Stadium: Stade Mohammed V Attendance: 0 (Note: The match was played behind closed doors due to the COVID-19 pandemic in Morocco.); Referee: Daki Reddad

9 December 2020 Round 2	Difaâ El Jadidi	0–1	Wydad AC	El Jadida
15:30	Dahbi (yellow card) 57'	Report	Saidi (yellow card) 16'; El Kaabi 31'; Ellafi (yellow card) 74'; Tagnaouti (yellow card) 90+3'	Stadium: Stade El Abdi; Attendance: 0 Referee: Mohamed Nhiyeh

12 December 2020 Round 3	OC Safi	2–1	Wydad AC	Safi
17:30	Khabba (yellow card) 4'; El Aroui (yellow card) 15'; Kassi 25', (penalty missed) 28'; Attouchi (yellow card) 54' (red card) 87'; Zaya 76'	Report	Saidi (yellow card) 9'; Dari (red card) 52'; Ellafi 55'; Aboulfath (yellow card) 59'; El Kaabi (penalty missed) 90'	Stadium: Stade El Massira; Attendance: 0 Referee: Redouane Jayed

19 December 2020 Round 4	Wydad AC	3–0	Hassania Agadir	Casablanca
17:30	Aboulfath (yellow card) 29'; Ellafi 43' (pen.); Msuva 53'; El Amloud 90+5'	Report	Ech-Chammakh (yellow card) 40' (yellow-red card) 77'; Rami (yellow card) 60'	Stadium: Stade Mohammed V Attendance: 0 Referee: Abdelaziz Lamsallek

26 December 2020 Round 5	Maghreb de Fès	0–1	Wydad AC	Fez
19:30	El Oualadi (yellow card) 16'	Report	Msuva 30'; Ait Allal (yellow card) 68'	Stadium: Stade Hassan II; Attendance: 0 Referee: Daki Reddad

16 February 2021 Round 6	Wydad AC	3–2	FUS Rabat	Casablanca
19:30	El Kaabi 23' (pen.); Jabrane (yellow card) 26'; Ellafi 35'; Dari 74'	Report	El Bassil (yellow card) 21'; Limouri 51'; Belammari 90+4'	Stadium: Stade Mohammed V Attendance: 0 Referee: Hicham Tamssmani

19 February 2021 Round 7	Renaissance Zemamra	1–2	Wydad AC	Mohammedia
15:00	Atchabao 74'; Radouani (yellow card) 79'	Report	El Kaabi 4', 48'; Aboulfath (yellow card) 44'	Stadium: Stade El Bachir; Attendance: 0 Referee: Abdelaziz Lamssalek

11 March 2021 Round 9	Moghreb Tétouan	2–2	Wydad AC	Fez
19:30	Noussir (yellow card) 26'; Khaloua 34'; Kamal 36'; Lamrabat (yellow card) 90'	Report	Jabrane (yellow card) 12'; Msuva 13'; El Kaabi 17'	Stadium: Stade Hassan II; Attendance: 0 Referee: Adil Zourak

21 March 2021 Round 10	Wydad AC	2–0	Raja CA	Casablanca
17:00	El Amloud 4', (yellow card) 70'; Dari 15'; Jabrane (yellow card) 45+2'; Ellafi (yellow card) 66'	Report	El Wardi (yellow card) 24'; Hadhoudi (yellow card) 82'	Stadium: Stade Mohammed V Attendance: 0 Referee: Jalal Jayed

7 April 2021 Round 11	Rapide Oued Zem	0–1	Wydad AC	Khouribga
19:30	Blé (yellow card) 25'; Chitou (yellow card) 45'	Report	Saidi 37'; Aboulfath (yellow card) 48'	Stadium: Stade du Phosphate; Attendance: 0 Referee: Abderrahim Yacoubi

15 April 2021 Round 12	Wydad AC	1–1	Mouloudia Oujda	Casablanca
22:00 UTC+0	Comara (yellow card) 12'; Attiyat Allah (yellow card) 34'; Dari (yellow card) 52'; El Kaabi 80'	Report	Khafi 14' (pen.); El Ghanjaoui (yellow card) 27'; Qasmi (yellow card) 78'	Stadium: Stade Mohammed V Attendance: 0 Referee: Redouane Jiyed

25 April 2021 Round 13	Ittihad Tanger	3–2	Wydad AC	Tangier
22:00 UTC+0	Batezadio (yellow card) 67'; Anouar 72' (pen.); Méyé 77' (pen.); Khallati (yellow card) 79'; Chibi 90+4', (yellow card) 90+5'	Report	El Amloud 7'; Msuva 38'; El Moudane (yellow card) 90+6'	Stadium: Stade Ibn Batouta; Attendance: 0 Referee: Abdelaziz Lamssalek

29 April 2021 Round 14	Wydad AC	1–1	SCC Mohammédia	Casablanca
22:00 UTC+0	Aboulfath (yellow card) 24'; El Kaabi 71'	Report	Lamlioui 7'; Tine (yellow card) 33'; Nassik (yellow card) 45'	Stadium: Stade Mohammed V Attendance: 0 Referee: Mostafa Kechaf

2 May 2021 Round 8	Wydad AC	4–0	RS Berkane	Casablanca
22:00 UTC+0	Jabrane 24' (pen.); Aboulfath (yellow card) 33'; Dari (yellow card) 63'; Ounajem 71' (pen.); El Karti 75'; Attiyat Allah (yellow card) 85'; Msuva 89'	Report	Laachir (yellow card) 5'; Dayo (red card) 22'; El Bahraoui (yellow card) 35'; Namsaoui (yellow card) 68'; Laaroubi (yellow card) 69'; Bentarcha (yellow card) 70'; Krouch (red card) 90+3'	Stadium: Stade Mohammed V Attendance: 0 Referee: Yassine Bouslim

9 May 2021 Round 15	ASFAR	0–0	Wydad AC	Rabat
22:00 UTC+0		Report		Stadium: Prince Moulay Abdellah Stadium; Attendance: 0 Referee: Daki Reddad

18 May 2021 Round 18	Wydad AC	3–1	OC Safi	Casablanca
21:30	Ellafi 11', 25'; El Amloud 86'	Report	Mouddne (yellow card) 22'; Amri 28', (yellow card) 89'; Sabbar (yellow card) 49'	Stadium: Stade Mohammed V Attendance: 0 Referee: Abderrahim Yacoubi

26 May 2021 Round 20	Wydad AC	2–0	Maghreb de Fès	Casablanca
17:00	Ellafi 50'; Ounajem 82'	Report	Alami (yellow card) 37'; El Oualadi (yellow card) 43'	Stadium: Stade Mohammed V Attendance: 0 Referee: Daki Reddad

30 May 2021 Round 21	FUS Rabat	0–0	Wydad AC	Rabat
19:15	Maouhoub (yellow card) 28'	Report	Aboulfath (yellow card) 21'; El Amloud (yellow card) 55'	Stadium: Stade Moulay Hassan; Attendance: 0 Referee: Adil Zourak

3 June 2021 Round 16	Youssoufia Berrechid	0–1	Wydad AC	Berrechid
21:30	Ennakhli (yellow card) 24'; Chihab (yellow card) 90'	Report	El Hassouni (yellow card) 45+3'; El Kaabi 50'; Ounajem (yellow card) 65'; Attiyat Allah (yellow card) 65'; Tagnaouti (yellow card) 77'	Stadium: Stade Municipal; Attendance: 0 Referee: Mohamed Nhiyeh

9 June 2021 Round 17	Wydad AC	4–2	Difaâ El Jadidi	Casablanca
17:00	Msuva 3'; El Kaabi 32', 40', 74'; Aboulfath (yellow card) 90+1'	Report	Najmeddine 5'; Dahbi (yellow card) 37'; Boukhriss (penalty missed) 90+5', 90+5'	Stadium: Stade Mohammed V Attendance: 0 Referee: Redouane Jiyed

13 June 2021 Round 19	Hassania Agadir	3–5	Wydad AC	Agadir
19:15	Dari 4' (o.g.); Malo (yellow card) 28' (yellow-red card) 80'; Alfahli 57' (pen.); Mallouki 61'; Rami (yellow card) 80'	Report	Dari (yellow card) 17', (goal) 74'; El Hassouni (yellow card) 28'; El Karti 38'; Ellafi 58'; Msuva 87'; El Kaabi 90+5' (pen.)	Stadium: Stade Adrar; Attendance: 0 Referee: Hamza El Fareq

16 June 2021 Round 22	Wydad AC	0–0	Renaissance Zemamra	Casablanca
19:15	Rahim (yellow card) 44'	Report	Radouani (yellow card) 90'; Labhiri (yellow card) 90+2'	Stadium: Stade Mohammed V Attendance: 0 Referee: Abderrahim Yacoubi

22 June 2021 Round 23	RS Berkane	0–2	Wydad AC	Berkane
21:30	Iajour (red card) 65'; Laachir (yellow card) 87'; Namsaoui (yellow card) 89'; Naji (yellow card) 90+4'; Regragui (red card) 90+7'	Report	Rahim (yellow card) 30'; Sioudi (yellow card) 45+1'; Ait Allal (yellow card) 48'; Chrachem 49'; Aouk (yellow card) 53'; El Moutaraji 76'; Farhane (red card) 90+7'	Stadium: Stade Municipal; Attendance: 0 Referee: Nabil Benrkiya

30 June 2021 Round 24	Wydad AC	4–2	Moghreb Tétouan	Casablanca
19:15	El Hassouni 7'; El Karti 13'; El Kaabi 43' (pen.), 51'	Report	Aznabet (yellow card) 24'; Noussir (yellow card) 40'; Kamal (yellow card) 45'; Khaloua 58'; El Moussaoui 70' (pen.); Jabroun (yellow card) 70'	Stadium: Stade Mohammed V Attendance: 0 Referee: Daki Reddad

3 July 2021 Round 25	Raja CA	1–2	Wydad AC	Casablanca
21:30	Zniti (yellow card) 55'; Rahimi 56' (pen.), (yellow card) 57'	Report	El Amloud 15'; Jabrane (yellow card) 28'; El Kaabi (penalty missed) 42'; El Moutaraji 70', (yellow card) 71'	Stadium: Stade Mohammed V Attendance: 0 Referee: Redouane Jayed

7 July 2021 Round 26	Wydad AC	2–0	Rapide Oued Zem	Casablanca
21:30	El Moutaraji 30'; El Kaabi 41'; Msuva (red card) 74'	Report		Stadium: Stade Mohammed V Attendance: 0 Referee: Hicham Tamssmani

14 July 2021 Round 27	Mouloudia Oujda	0–2	Wydad AC	Oujda
21:30	Qasmi (yellow card) 89'	Report	Jabrane (yellow card) 13'; El Kaabi 64'; El Hassouni (yellow card) 77'; Ounajem (yellow card) 86'; Attiyat Allah 90'; Tagnaouti (yellow card) 90+7'	Stadium: Honneur Stadium; Attendance: 0 Referee: Hamza El Fareq

18 July 2021 Round 28	Wydad AC	2–4	Ittihad Tanger	Casablanca
17:00	Aouk (red card) 45'; El Kaabi 64'; Chrachem (yellow card) 78'; El Ouardi 90+2'; Ait Allal (yellow card) 90+6'	Report	Méyé 15' (pen.), 16', (penalty missed) 49; El Asbahi (yellow card) 35' (yellow-red card) 59'; Khallati (yellow card) 40'; Chentouf (yellow card) 45'; Jayid (yellow card) 80'; Anouar 85'; Al Aiz (yellow card) 87'; Aouattah (yellow card) 90+5'; Chibi (yellow card) 90+6'; Mukoko 90+6', (yellow card) 90+7'	Stadium: Stade Mohammed V Attendance: 0 Referee: Daki Reddad

24 July 2021 Round 29	SCC Mohammédia	1–1	Wydad AC	Mohammedia
19:15	El Wasti (red card) 19'; Lamlioui 51'; Boulacsoute (yellow card) 71'; Boucheta (yellow card) 88'	Report	Attiyat Allah (yellow card) 65'; El Kaabi (penalty missed) 89', 90+3'	Stadium: Stade El Bachir; Attendance: 0 Referee: Hicham Tamssmani

28 July 2021 Round 30	Wydad AC	2–0	ASFAR	Casablanca
19:00	El Moutaraji 22', 50'	Report		Stadium: Stade Mohammed V Attendance: 0 Referee: Hamza El Fareq

== Moroccan Throne Cup ==
30 December 2020 Round of 32	Olympique Khouribga	0–1	Wydad AC	Khouribga
17:00		Report	Saidi 82'	Stadium: Stade du Phosphate; Attendance: 0 (closed doors); Referee: Hicham Tamssmani

20 April 2021 Round of 16	Rapide Oued Zem	1–4	Wydad AC	Khouribga
22:00 UTC+0	Blé 67' (pen.)	Report	Jabrane 16' (pen.); El Hassouni 30' (pen.), 50'; El Kaabi 52'	Stadium: Stade du Phosphate; Attendance: 0 (closed doors); Referee: Adil Zourak

5 May 2021 Quarter-finals	Wydad AC	4–0	SCC Mohammédia	Casablanca
22:00 UTC+0	El Kaabi 26', 45+1'; El Karti 56', 63'	Report		Stadium: Stade Mohammed V Attendance: 0 (closed doors); Referee: Karim Sabry

1 August 2021 Semi-finals	Wydad AC	2–2 (a.e.t.) (3–5 p)	Moghreb Tétouan	Marrakesh
21:30	El Kaabi 42'; Msuva 74'	Report	Khaloua 46'; Jabroun 71'	Stadium: Marrakesh Stadium; Attendance: 0 (closed doors); Referee: Nabil Benrkiya
	Penalties
	Jabrane (penalty scored); Attiyat Allah (penalty scored); El Hassouni (penalty scored); Ellafi (penalty missed)		(penalty scored) Safsafi; (penalty scored) El Moussaoui; (penalty scored) Gueye; (penalty scored) Bouadli; (penalty scored) El Yousfi

== Champions League ==
=== First round ===
23 December 2020 First leg	Stade Malien (Mali)	1–0	(Morocco) Wydad AC	Bamako, Mali
16:00 UTC+0	Doumbia (yellow card) 8'; Coulibaly 58'	Report		Stadium: Stade du 26 Mars; Attendance: 0 (closed doors); Referee: Sekou Ahmed Touré (Guinea)

6 January 2021 Second leg	Wydad AC (Morocco)	3–0 (3–1 agg.)	(Mali) Stade Malien	Casablanca, Morocco
17:00 UTC+1	El Kaabi 43'; Ellafi 46', 64'; Jabrane (yellow card) 57'; El Karti (yellow card) 80'	Report	Doumbia (yellow card) 34'; Coulibaly (yellow card) 44'	Stadium: Stade Mohammed V Attendance: 0 (closed doors); Referee: Amin Omar (Egypt)

=== Group stage ===
==== Group C ====
Pos	Team	Pld	W	D	L	GF	GA	GD	Pts	Qualification	WAC	KZC	HOR	PET
1	(Morocco) Wydad AC	6	4	1	1	9	1	+8	13	Advance to knockout stage	—	4–0	2–0	2–0
2	(South Africa) Kaizer Chiefs	6	2	3	1	5	6	−1	9 (Note: Tied on head-to-head points (2), on head-to-head goal difference (0) and on head-to-head goals scored (2). Head-to-head away goals scored: Kaizer Chiefs 2, Horoya 0.)	Advance to knockout stage	1–0	—	0–0	2–0
3	(Guinea) Horoya	6	2	3	1	5	4	+1	9		0–0	2–2	—	2–0
4	(Angola) Petro de Luanda	6	0	1	5	0	8	−8	1		0–1	0–0	0–1	—

Source: Soccerway
Notes:

23 February 2021 Matchday 2	Petro de Luanda (Angola)	0–1	(Morocco) Wydad AC	Luanda, Angola
14:00 UTC+1	Pedro (yellow card) 51'; Job (penalty missed) 74'; Oliveira (yellow card) 90'	Report	El Kaabi (penalty missed) 37', 71'	Stadium: Estádio 11 de Novembro; Attendance: 0 (closed doors); Referee: Jean-Jacques Ndala Ngambo (DR Congo)

28 February 2021 (Note: The Wydad AC v Kaizer Chiefs match, originally scheduled to be played at Stade Mohammed V, Casablanca on 13 February 2021, was postponed due to restrictions related to the COVID-19 pandemic imposed by Morocco on travelers from South Africa out of concern of the variant 501.V2. On 22 February 2021, CAF announced that the match has been scheduled for 28 February 2021 in Burkina Faso at Stade du 4 Août, Ouagadougou.) Matchday 1	Wydad AC (Morocco)	4–0	(South Africa) Kaizer Chiefs	Ouagadougou, Burkina Faso
16:00 UTC+0	Ounajem 7'; Attiyat Allah (yellow card) 24'; El Kaabi 44'; Msuva 86'; Jabrane 90+2' (pen.)	Report	Mphahlele (yellow card) 13' (yellow-red card) 90+1'; Frosler (yellow card) 63'; Khune (yellow card) 77'	Stadium: Stade du 4 Août; Attendance: 0 (closed doors); Referee: Sadok Selmi (Tunisia)

6 March 2021 Matchday 3	Wydad AC (Morocco)	2–0	(Guinea) Horoya	Casablanca, Morocco
20:00 UTC+1	El Kaabi 19'; Aboulfath (yellow card) 80'; Msuva 89'	Report	Mangué (yellow card) 32'; Abass (yellow card) 72'; Sylla (yellow card) 90+2'	Stadium: Stade Mohammed V Attendance: 0 (closed doors); Referee: Mehdi Abid Charef (Algeria)

16 March 2021 Matchday 4	Horoya (Guinea)	0–0	(Morocco) Wydad AC	Conakry, Mali
16:00 UTC+0		Report	Jabrane (yellow card) 76'; Tagnaouti (yellow card) 90'	Stadium: General Lansana Conté Stadium; Attendance: 0 (closed doors); Referee: Daniel Laryea (Ghana)

3 April 2021 Matchday 5	Kaizer Chiefs (South Africa)	1–0	(Morocco) Wydad AC	Johannesburg, South Africa
18:00 UTC+2	Nurković (yellow card) 13' (yellow-red card) 89'; Akpeyi (red card) 40'; Parker 48'	Report	Farhane (yellow card) 13'	Stadium: FNB Stadium; Attendance: 0 (closed doors); Referee: Ibrahim Nour El Din (Egypt)

10 April 2021 Matchday 6	Wydad AC (Morocco)	2–0	(Angola) Petro de Luanda	Casablanca, Morocco
20:00 UTC+1	El Karti 15'; Ounajem 22'; El Moutaraji (yellow card) 60'; El Moudane (yellow card) 80'	Report	Oliveira (yellow card) 35'; Yano (yellow card) 65'	Stadium: Stade Mohammed V Attendance: 0 (closed doors); Referee: Mutaz Ibrahim (Libya)

=== Knockout stage ===
==== Quarter-finals ====
14 May 2021 First leg	MC Alger (Algeria)	1–1	(Morocco) Wydad AC	Algiers, Algeria
20:00 UTC+1	Diomande (yellow card) 41'; Abdellaoui (yellow card) 79'; Rebiaï 83'	Report	Dari (yellow card) 13'; Jabrane 66' (pen.); Tagnaouti (yellow card) 90+4'	Stadium: Stade du 5 Juillet; Attendance: 0 (closed doors); Referee: Bamlak Tessema Weyesa (Ethiopia)

22 May 2021 Second leg	Wydad AC (Morocco)	1–0 (2–1 agg.)	(Algeria) MC Alger	Casablanca
17:00 UTC+1	Ellafi (yellow card) 72'; El Karti 90+2'	Report	Lamara (yellow card) 29'; Harrag (yellow card) 59'; Addadi (yellow card) 83'; Boutagga (yellow card) 89' (red card) 90+4'; Belkheir (red card) 90+4'	Stadium: Stade Mohammed V Attendance: 0 (closed doors); Referee: Joshua Bondo (Botswana)

==== Semi-finals ====
19 June 2021 First leg	Wydad AC (Morocco)	0–1	(South Africa) Kaizer Chiefs	Casablanca
20:00 UTC+1		Report	Nurković 34'; Sasman (yellow card) 52'; Frosler (yellow card) 70'	Stadium: Stade Mohammed V Attendance: 0 (closed doors); Referee: Maguette N'Diaye (Senegal)

26 June 2021 Second leg	Kaizer Chiefs (South Africa)	0–0 (1–0 agg.)	(Morocco) Wydad AC	Johannesburg, South Africa
18:00 UTC+2	Frosler (yellow card) 51'; Akpeyi (yellow card) 80'	Report	Jabrane (yellow card) 45+1'; El Hassouni (yellow card) 45+4'; Farhane (yellow card) 49'	Stadium: FNB Stadium; Attendance: 0 (closed doors); Referee: Jean-Jacques Ndala Ngambo (DR Congo)

== Statistics ==
As of 12 October 2020

No.	Pos	Nat	Player	Total		Botola		Throne Cup		Champions League	
No.	Pos	Nat	Player	Apps	Goals	Apps	Goals	Apps	Goals	Apps	Goals
Goalkeepers
26	GK	(Morocco) MAR	Ahmed Reda Tagnaouti	0	0	0	0	0	0	0	0
27	GK	(Morocco) MAR	Aissa Sioudi	0	0	0	0	0	0	0	0
1	GK	(Morocco) MAR	Yanis Henin	0	0	0	0	0	0	0	0
	GK	(Morocco) MAR	Taha Mourid	0	0	0	0	0	0	0	0
Defenders
	DF	(Morocco) MAR	Ibrahim El Baz	0	0	0	0	0	0	0	0
13	DF	(Morocco) MAR	Ibrahim Najm Eddine	0	0	0	0	0	0	0	0
29	DF	(Ivory Coast) CIV	Cheick Comara	0	0	0	0	0	0	0	0
	DF	(Morocco) MAR	Achraf Dari	0	0	0	0	0	0	0	0
	DF	(Morocco) MAR	Amine Abou Elfath	0	0	0	0	0	0	0	0
24	DF	(Morocco) MAR	Mohamed Rahim	0	0	0	0	0	0	0	0
	DF	(Morocco) MAR	Amine Farhan	0	0	0	0	0	0	0	0
28	DF	(Morocco) MAR	Abdellatif Noussair	0	0	0	0	0	0	0	0
22	DF	(Morocco) MAR	Ayoub El Amloud	0	0	0	0	0	0	0	0
23	DF	(Morocco) MAR	Zakaria Kiani	0	0	0	0	0	0	0	0
8	DF	(Morocco) MAR	Badr Gaddarine	0	0	0	0	0	0	0	0
	DF	(Morocco) MAR	Ayoub Benchaoui	0	0	0	0	0	0	0	0
Midfielders
4	MF	(Morocco) MAR	Salaheddine Saidi	0	0	0	0	0	0	0	0
19	MF	(Morocco) MAR	Sofian El Moudane	0	0	0	0	0	0	0	0
5	MF	(Morocco) MAR	Yahya Jabrane	0	0	0	0	0	0	0	0
21	MF	(Morocco) MAR	Soufiane Karkache	0	0	0	0	0	0	0	0
6	MF	(Morocco) MAR	Anas Serrhat	0	0	0	0	0	0	0	0
	MF	(Morocco) MAR	Mohamed Saidani	0	0	0	0	0	0	0	0
2	MF	(Morocco) MAR	Ayoub Skouma	0	0	0	0	0	0	0	0
3	MF	(Morocco) MAR	Yahia Attiyat Allah	0	0	0	0	0	0	0	0
16	MF	(Morocco) MAR	Hamza Asrir	0	0	0	0	0	0	0	0
18	MF	(Morocco) MAR	Walid El Karti	0	0	0	0	0	0	0	0
20	MF	(Morocco) MAR	Ayman El Hassouni	0	0	0	0	0	0	0	0
Forwards
9	FW	(Morocco) MAR	Ayoub El Kaabi	0	0	0	0	0	0	0	0
15	FW	(Ivory Coast) CIV	Gbagbo Junior Magbi	0	0	0	0	0	0	0	0
11	FW	(Tanzania) TAN	Simon Msuva	0	0	0	0	0	0	0	0
7	FW	(Morocco) MAR	Zouheir El Moutaraji	0	0	0	0	0	0	0	0
10	FW	(Nigeria) NGR	Michael Babatunde	0	0	0	0	0	0	0	0
19	FW	(Libya) LBA	Muaid Ellafi	0	0	0	0	0	0	0	0
17	FW	(Morocco) MAR	Badie Aouk	0	0	0	0	0	0	0	0
Players transferred out during the season

Last updated: 8 June 2019
Source: fr.soccerway.com

=== Goalscorers ===
Includes all competitive matches. The list is sorted alphabetically by surname when total goals are equal.
