= Dieumerci =

Dieumerci is a Congolese given name. Notable people with the name include:

- Dieumerci Amale (born 1998), Congolese footballer
- Dieumerci Mbokani (born 1985), Congolese footballer
- Dieumerci Ndongala (born 1991), Congolese footballer
