= Mohamed Rahim =

Mohamed Rahim may refer to:

- Mohammed Naim Rahim, Afghan detainee at Guantanamo Bay
- Muhammad Rahim al Afghani, Afghan detainee at Guantanamo Bay
- Mohamed Rahim (footballer), Moroccan footballer
