= Jalal Daoudi =

Moroccan footballer

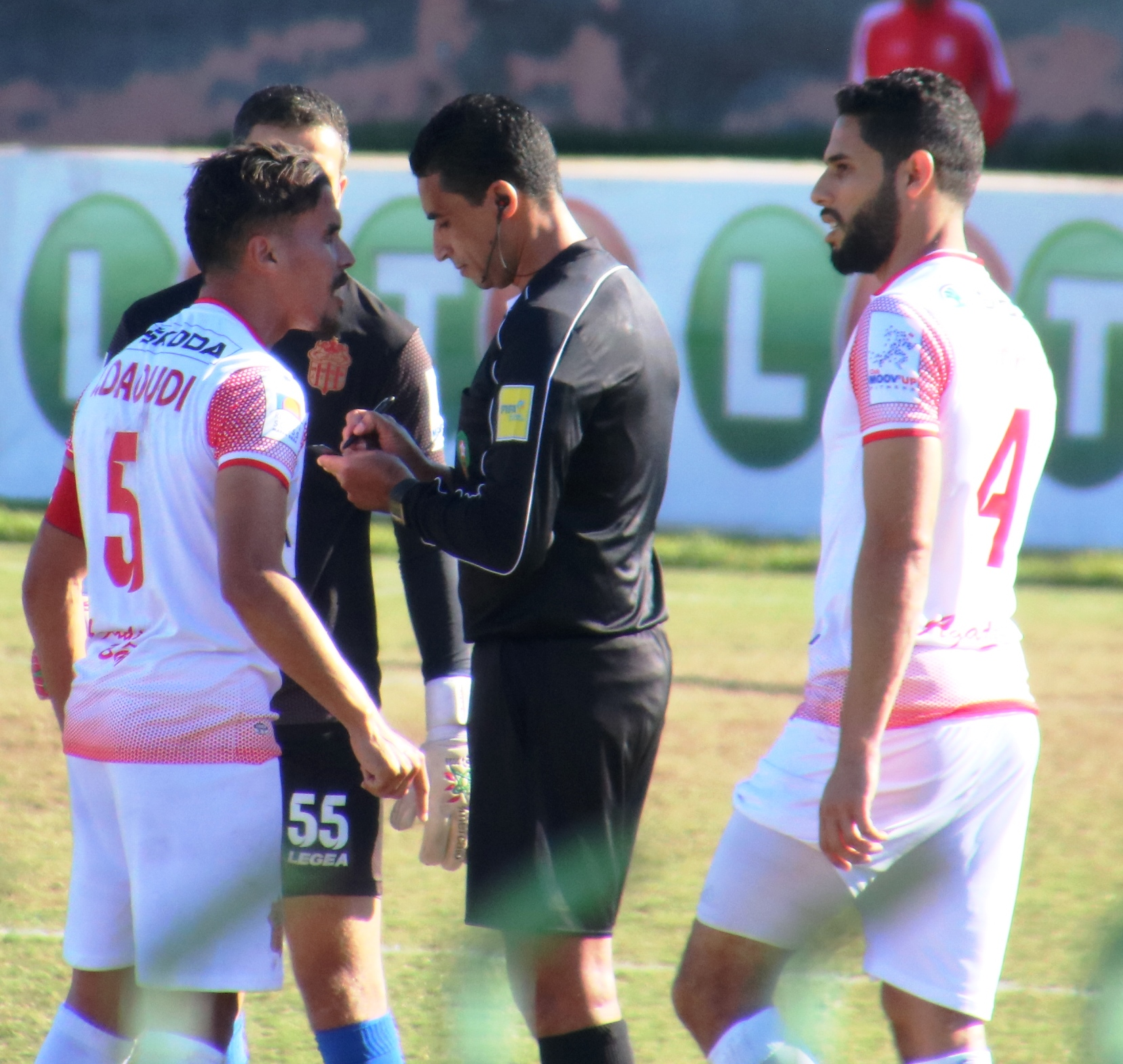

Personal information
- Full name: Jalal Daoudi
- Date of birth: 17 August 1988 (age 38)
- Place of birth: Agadir, Morocco
- Height: 1.77 m (5 ft 10 in)
- Position: Midfielder

Senior career*
Years	Team	Apps	(Gls)
2008–2011	Olympic Safi	27	(0)
2011–2013	DHJ	40	(2)
2013–2015	FUS	34	(1)
2015–2019	Hassania Agadir	106	(34)
2019–2021	Al-Raed	36	(9)
2021	→ FAR Rabat (loan)	17	(4)
2021–2023	Wydad AC	40	(3)
2023–2024	IR Tanger	3	(0)
- * Club domestic league appearances and goals

Jalal Daoudi (born 17 August 1988) is a Moroccan footballer who last played as a midfielder for Ittihad Tanger.

Daoudi previously captained Hassania Agadir. He also played in Saudi Arabia with Al-Raed.

Daoudi was a key figure in Wydad's midfield as the club won the 2021–22 CAF Champions League.

== Honours ==
=== Wydad AC ===
- Botola: 2021–22
- CAF Champions League: 2021–22
