= Muaid Ellafi =

Libyan footballer (born 1996)

Personal information
- Date of birth: 7 March 1996 (age 30)
- Place of birth: Zliten, Libya
- Height: 1.69 m (5 ft 7 in)
- Positions: Attacking midfielder; winger

Team information
- Current team: Al Ahli Tripoli
- Number: 7

Senior career*
Years	Team	Apps	(Gls)
2015–2016	Santa Clara	7	(0)
2016–2018	Al Ahli Tripoli	12	(6)
2018	Al-Shabab	5	(0)
2018–2020	USM Alger	32	(6)
2020–2023	Wydad AC	82	(15)
2023–	Al Ahli Tripoli	19	(8)

International career^{‡}
2017–	Libya	39	(9)
- * Club domestic league appearances and goals as of 14 March 2022 ‡ National team caps and goals as of 20 March 2025

Muaid Ellafi (Arabic: مُؤَيَّد اللَّافِي; born 7 March 1996) is a Libyan professional footballer who plays as a winger for Al Ahli Tripoli.

== Club career ==
=== USM Alger ===
On 15 December 2018, Muaid Ellafi joined USM Alger for two and a half years, after his contract was previously terminated with the Saudi Club Al-Shabab., he told the media that he had received several offers from Egyptian, Moroccan, Tunisian and even Algerian clubs, but he chose USM Alger because It's a big club and has great fans and he aspires to win titles with him, He was assigned the number 10 shirt. Ellafi made his debut for USM Alger in the Ligue 1 against DRB Tadjenanet as a substitute for his injured Oualid Ardji in 1–0 Loss. On 15 January 2019, Ellafi Once again he entered as a substitute in the 67th minute for Mohamed Benyahia in the Derby against NA Hussein Dey, and only needed three minutes to score his first goal and the last in the game from a Direct free kick in 4–1 victory. Ellafi said after the end of the game that he was happy with this win and also his first goal and said my start was successful especially as I return to competition after four months and he will work to be better in the future. On 26 January 2019, and after four games as a substitute he made his debut as a starter in the Ligue 1 against JS Saoura in 2–0 victory. He left the field in the 67th minute because he was not ready to play for 90 minutes. On 26 May 2019, In the last game against CS Constantine, Ellafi he made two assist for Abderrahmane Meziane and Prince Ibara respectively to help them win 3–1 and also achieving his first title with USM Alger.

Before the start of the new season Ellafi return to training until late July in the USM Alger's trainees in Tunisia to end the controversy over his survival because of the club's financial crisis, later he told the Algerian media that he could leave the club easily as a foreign player because he had not received his salary for five months, but he said his love for this club made him decide to stay. On 25 August 2019, Ellafi scored his first goals in the CAF Champions League against AS Sonidep in 3–1 home victory.

== International career ==
Ellafi made his international debut for Libya in 2014 In a friendly match against Morocco. On 6 June 2015, in a friendly match against Mali, he scored his first international goals in 2–2 draw. In August during a 2018 African Nations Championship qualifiers against Algeria he scored twice to lead his country to qualify for the tournament.

== Career statistics ==
=== Club ===
As of 14 January 2022

Appearances and goals by club, season and competition
Club	Season	League			Cup		Continental		Other		Total	
Club	Season	Division	Apps	Goals	Apps	Goals	Apps	Goals	Apps	Goals	Apps	Goals
Al-Shabab	2017–18	Saudi Professional League	5	0	2	0	—		—		7	0
USM Alger	2018–19	Ligue 1	14	5	1	0	—		—		15	5
USM Alger	2019–20	Ligue 1	18	1	1	0	6 (Note: Appearance(s) in CAF Champions League)	1	—		25	2
USM Alger	Total		32	6	2	0	6	1	—		40	7
Wydad AC	2020–21	Botola Pro	24	7	3	0	11	2	—		38	9
Wydad AC	2021–22	Botola Pro	12	3	0	0	2	2	—		14	3
Wydad AC	Total		36	10	3	0	13	2	—		52	12
Career total			37	6	4	6	1	—		47	7	

=== International ===
Scores and results list Libya's goal tally first, score column indicates score after each Ellafi goal.

List of international goals scored by Muaid Ellafi
No.	Date	Venue	Opponent	Score	Result	Competition
1	6 June 2015	Centre Sportif de Maâmora, Salé, Morocco	Mali	2–2	2–2	Friendly
2	9 June 2017	Petro Sport Stadium, Cairo, Egypt	Seychelles	5–0	5–1	2019 Africa Cup of Nations qualification
3	12 August 2017	Mohamed Hamlaoui Stadium, Constantine, Algeria	Algeria	2–1	2–1	2018 African Nations Championship qualification
4	18 August 2017	Stade Taïeb Mhiri, Sfax, Tunisia	Algeria	1–1	1–1	2018 African Nations Championship qualification
5	7 September 2019	Stade Municipal de Berrechid, Berrechid, Morocco	Niger	1–0	2–0	Friendly
6	25 March 2021	Martyrs of February Stadium, Benghazi, Libya	Tunisia	1–0	2–5	2021 Africa Cup of Nations qualification
7	25 March 2021	Martyrs of February Stadium, Benghazi, Libya	Tunisia	2–3	2–5	2021 Africa Cup of Nations qualification
8	26 March 2022	Cheikha Ould Boïdiya Stadium, Nouakchott, Mauritania	Niger	2–0	2–1	Friendly
9	20 March 2025	Benina Martyrs Stadium, Benghazi, Libya	Angola	1–0	1–1	2026 FIFA World Cup qualification

== Honours ==
Al Ahli Tripoli

- Libyan Premier League: 2016

USM Alger

- Algerian Ligue Professionnelle 1: 2018–19

Wydad AC

- Botola Pro: 2020–21, 2021–22
- CAF Champions League: 2021–22; runner-up: 2022–23
