= Abdellah Haimoud =

Moroccan footballer (born 2001)

Personal information
- Full name: Abdellah Haimoud
- Date of birth: 21 May 2001 (age 25)
- Place of birth: Casablanca, Morocco
- Height: 1.72 m (5 ft 8 in)
- Position: Midfielder

Team information
- Current team: Al Ta'awon

Youth career
- Mohammed VI Football Academy

Senior career*
Years	Team	Apps	(Gls)
2021–2024	Wydad AC	67	(3)
2025	Rouen	10	(0)
2025–	Al Ta'awon		

International career^{‡}
2022–2023	Morocco U23	4	(1)
- * Club domestic league appearances and goals as of 26 May 2025 ‡ National team caps and goals as of 7 September 2023

Abdellah Haimoud (Arabic: عبد الله حيمود; born 21 May 2001) is a Moroccan professional footballer who plays as a midfielder for Libyan club Al Ta'awon.

== Club career ==
After starting his youth career at Mohammed VI Football Academy. In 2021, he obtained a transfer to Wydad AC.

On 30 May 2022, he entered the game in the 84th minute in place of Guy Mbenza against Al-Ahly SC in the final of the CAF Champions League and won the competition thanks to a 2–0 victory at the Stade Mohammed V. On 28 July 2022, he was established and reached the final of the Moroccan Cup after a penalty session defeat against RS Berkane (draw, 0–0).

On 15 January 2025, Haimoud signed with Rouen in French third-tier Championnat National.

== International career ==
On 28 July 2022, he was summoned by coach Hicham Dmii for a training camp with the Morocco A' team, appearing on a list of 23 players who will take part in the Islamic Solidarity Games in August 2022.

On 15 September 2022, he was called up by Hicham Dmii with Olympic Morocco for a double confrontation against Olympic Senegal as part of a preparation camp for qualifying for the 2024 Summer Olympics.

== Honours ==
Wydad AC

- Botola: 2020–21, 2021-22
- CAF Champions League: 2021–22
