= Mohamed Ouattara (footballer, born 1999) =

Ivorian professional footballer (born 1999)

Personal information
- Date of birth: 28 June 1999 (age 27)
- Place of birth: Ivory Coast
- Position: Defender

Senior career*
Years	Team	Apps	(Gls)
2018–2020	Wydad Casablanca		
2019–2020	→ Renaissance Zemamra	8	(0)
2020–2022	Al-Hilal Club		
2022–2023	Simba S.C.		
2023–2024	Al-Ain		
- * Club domestic league appearances and goals

Mohamed Ouattara (born 28 June 1999) is an Ivorian professional footballer who plays as a defender.
