= Gbagbo Junior Magbi =

Ivorian professional footballer (born 1993)

Gbagbo Junior
Personal information
- Full name: Gbagbo Laurent Junior Magbi
- Date of birth: 14 December 1993 (age 32)
- Place of birth: Ivory Coast
- Height: 1.77 m (5 ft 10 in)
- Position: Forward

Team information
- Current team: Golden Arrows
- Number: 43

Senior career*
Years	Team	Apps	(Gls)
2014–2015	AS Tanda		
2015–2017	ASEC Mimosas		
2017–2019	Al-Ahly Shendi		
2019	Damac	9	(1)
2019–2020	AFAD Djékanou		
2020–2021	Wydad Casablanca	8	(3)
2021	→ Al-Tai (loan)	15	(5)
2022	Jeddah	15	(2)
2023–	Golden Arrows	2	(0)
- * Club domestic league appearances and goals as of 1 August 2024

Gbagbo Laurent Junior Magbi (born 14 December 1993) is an Ivorian professional footballer who plays as a forward for Golden Arrows.

== Club career ==
On 23 October 2020, Magbi appeared for Wydad Casablanca in their 3–1 CAF Champions League semifinal loss to Egyptian side Al-Ahly.

Magbi signed a three-year deal with Wydad Casablanca, but the Moroccan club attempted to terminate his deal early. Magbi later joined Saudi Arabian club Al-Tai on a six-month loan. On 25 January 2022, Magbi joined Saudi Arabian club Jeddah. He moved to South African Golden Arrows in August 2023.
