= Guy Mbenza =

Congolese footballer

Personal information
- Full name: Guy Carel Mbenza Mbenza Kamboleke
- Date of birth: 1 April 2000 (age 26)
- Place of birth: Brazzaville, Congo
- Height: 1.84 m (6 ft 1/2 in)
- Position: Forward

Team information
- Current team: Liaoning Tieren
- Number: 9

Senior career*
Years	Team	Apps	(Gls)
2016	JS Poto-Poto		
2017	AC Léopards		
2017–2018	La Mancha		
2018	AS Otôho		
2019–2020	Stade Tunisien	25	(11)
2020	Cercle Brugge	2	(2)
2020–2023	Royal Antwerp	1	(0)
2021	→ Stade Lausanne Ouchy (loan)	15	(7)
2021–2022	→ Wydad AC (loan)	28	(16)
2022–2023	Al-Tai	29	(10)
2023–2025	Muaither	11	(5)
2024	→ Al-Kuwait (loan)	18	(7)
2025-	Liaoning Tieren	52	(39)

International career^{‡}
2016	Congo U20		
2017–	Congo	21	(5)
Medal record
AC Léopards
Winner	Congo Premier League	2017
- * Club domestic league appearances and goals as of 8 November 2026 ‡ National team caps and goals as of 11:00, 21 September 2023 (UTC)

Guy Carel Mbenza Mbenza Kamboleke (born 1 April 2000) is a Congolese professional footballer who plays as a forward for Chinese club Liaoning Tieren, and the Congo national football team.

== Club career ==
On 17 February 2021, Mbenza joined Swiss Challenge League side Stade Lausanne Ouchy until the end of the season.

On 16 July 2022, Mbenza joined Saudi Arabian club Al-Tai on a permanent deal.

On 31 July 2023, Mbenza joined Qatar Stars League club Muaither.

== International career ==
Mbenza made his international debut in a 2–0 home loss to Senegal, replacing Césaire Gandzé after 87 minutes.

== Career statistics ==
=== Club ===
As of match played 8 November 2026

Appearances and goals by club, season and competition
Club	Season	League			Cup		Continental		Other		Total	
Club	Season	Division	Apps	Goals	Apps	Goals	Apps	Goals	Apps	Goals	Apps	Goals
Stade Tunisien	2018–19	Tunisian Ligue Professionnelle 1	13	5	1	0	2	0	—		16	5
Stade Tunisien	2019–20	Tunisian Ligue Professionnelle 1	12	6	0	0	—		—		12	6
Stade Tunisien	Total		25	11	1	0	2	0	—		28	11
Cercle Brugge	2020–21	Belgian First Division A	2	2	0	0	—		—		2	2
Antwerp	2020–21	Belgian First Division A	1	0	1	1	—		—		2	1
Lausanne	2020–21	Swiss Challenge League	15	7	0	0	—		—		15	7
Wydad AC	2021–22	Botola	28	16	2	1	11	3	—		41	20
Al-Tai	2022–23	Saudi Professional League	29	10	1	0	—		—		30	10
Muaither	2023–24	Qatar Stars League	11	5	0	0	—		2	1	13	6
Muaither	2024–25	Qatari Second Division	7	2	0	0	—		—		7	2
Muaither	Total		18	7	0	0	—		2	1	20	8
Al-Kuwait (loan)	2023–24	Kuwait Premier League	18	7	0	0	—		—		18	7
Liaoning Tieren	2025	China League One	27	28	1	0	—		—		28	28
Liaoning Tieren	2026	Chinese Super League	25	11	0	0	—		—		15	11
Liaoning Tieren	Total		52	39	1	0	—		—		53	39
Career total			188	99	6	2	13	3	2	1	209	105

2Notes

=== International ===
As of match played 21 September 2023.

National team	Year	Apps	Goals
Congo	2017	1	0
Congo	2018	0	0
Congo	2019	1	0
Congo	2020	1	0
Congo	2021	9	3
Congo	2022	6	2
Congo	2023	3	0
Total		21	5

== Honours ==
Wydad AC

- Botola Pro: 2021–22
- CAF Champions League: 2021–22

Liaoning Tieren

- China League One: 2025

Individual

- Botola Pro Top scorer: 2021–22
- Botola Pro Team of the Season: 2021–22
