= Yanis Henin =

Moroccan footballer (born 1999)

Personal information
- Date of birth: 24 June 1999 (age 27)
- Place of birth: Paris, France
- Height: 1.86 m (6 ft 1 in)
- Position: Goalkeeper

Team information
- Current team: CR Bernoussi
- Number: 1

Youth career
- 2005–2012: FC Montrouge
- 2012–2015: Clairefontaine
- 2015–2017: Monaco

Senior career*
Years	Team	Apps	(Gls)
2017–2019	Monaco II	10	(0)
2020–2024	Wydad	2	(0)

International career^{‡}
2018	Morocco U18	5	(0)
2019–2020	Morocco U23	2	(0)
- * Club domestic league appearances and goals as of 07:04, 12 March 2023 (UTC) ‡ National team caps and goals as of 07:04, 12 March 2023 (UTC)

Yanis Henin (Arabic: يانيس هينين; born 24 June 1999) is a French and Moroccan professional footballer who plays as a goalkeeper for CR Bernoussi. He is a youth international for Morocco.

== Club career ==
Henin is a youth product of FC Montrouge, Clairefontaine and Monaco. He began his senior career with the reserves of Monaco in 2017, playing 2 seasons with them. Released in the summer of 2019, he transferred to the Moroccan club Wydad on 15 January 2020. He made his senior and professional debut with Wydad in a 1–0 CAF Champions League win over Petro de Luanda on 23 February 2021.

== International career ==
Henin is a youth international for Morocco, having played up to the Morocco U23s.

== Personal life ==
Henin was born in Paris, France. He holds French and Moroccan nationalities. Outside of football, Henin pursued a master's degree in Business and Engineering from the Moroccan university ISGA.

== Honours ==
Wydad

- Botola: 2020–21, 2021–22
