= Salaheddine Benyachou =

French professional footballer

Personal information
- Date of birth: 30 November 1999 (age 26)
- Place of birth: Safi, Morocco
- Position: Winger

Team information
- Current team: Wydad AC
- Number: 34

Youth career
- –2019: OC Safi

Senior career*
| Years | Team | Apps | (Gls) |
| 2020–2021 | OC Safi | 29 | (9) |
| 2021– | Wydad AC | 24 | (2) |
- * Club domestic league appearances and goals

Salaheddine Benyachou (Arabic: صلاح الدين بنيشو; born 30 November 1999); is a Moroccan professional footballer who plays as a forward for Botola club Wydad AC.

== Club career ==
=== OC Safi ===
After starting his youth career at OC Safi. On 5 December 2020, he played his first full game for the OC Safi where he scored a super hat-trick in a 4–3 win over Difaâ Hassani El Jadidi.

=== Wydad AC ===
In August 2021, Benyachou signed up with Wydad AC for an amount of 3 million dirhams.
