= 2021–22 Botola Pro =

Moroccan football league season

Botola Inwi
- Season: 2021–22
- Dates: 10 September 2021 – 5 July 2022
- Champions: Wydad AC; 22nd title
- Relegated: Rapide Oued Zem; Youssoufia Berrechid
- Champions League: Wydad AC; Raja CA
- Confederation Cup: AS FAR; RS Berkane (Won the Throne cup)
- Matches: 240
- Goals: 519 (2.16 per match)
- Top goalscorer: Guy Mbenza (16 goals)
- Biggest home win: JS Soualem 3-0 Maghreb AS (18 September 2021); Raja CA 3-0 JS Soualem (24 September 2021); Maghreb AS 3-0 CAY Berrechid (2 October 2021); Maghreb AS 3-0 DH Jadidi (23 October 2021); RS Berkane 4-1 IR Tanger (31 October 2021); RS Berkane 4-1 CAY Berrechid (29 December 2021); SCC Mohammédia 3-0 IR Tanger (12 February 2022); SCC Mohammédia 4-1 RC Oued Zem (25 February 2022); AS FAR 4-1 IR Tanger (15 April 2022); Wydad AC 3-0 AS FAR (29 April 2022); Wydad AC 3-0 JS Soualem (19 June 2022)
- Biggest away win: CAY Berrechid 0-4 RS Berkane (4 July 2022)
- Highest scoring: JS Soualem 3-4 Wydad AC (19 November 2021); RS Berkane 4-3 JS Soualem (30 April 2022)
- Longest winning run: Raja CA (6 matches)
- Longest unbeaten run: Maghreb AS (22 matches)
- Longest winless run: CAY Berrechid (16 matches)
- Longest losing run: HUS Agadir (twice); RC Oued Zem; CAY Berrechid; SCC Mohammédia (4 matches)
- All statistics correct as of 5 July 2022.

The 2021–22 Botola Pro, also known as Botola Pro Inwi for sponsorship reasons, is the 65th season of the Premier League and the 11th under its new format of Moroccan Pro League, the top Moroccan professional league for association football clubs, since its establishment in 1956.

Wydad Casablanca came into the season as defending champions of the 2020–21 season. Olympique Khouribga and Jeunesse Soualem entered as the two promoted teams from the 2020–21 Botola 2.

The season began on September 10th, 2021, and ended on July 5th, 2022.

Wydad AC are crowned champion of this edition with a record of 22 Botola. Wydad AC and Raja CA drew the highest average home attendances in the 2021–22 Botola, with 45,000 and 40,087, respectively.

== Teams ==
=== Stadium and locations ===
Locations of the 2021–22 Botola teams

Team name	Acronym	Location	Stadium	Capacity
AS FAR	FAR	Rabat	Stade Moulay Abdellah	65,000
Chabab Mohammédia	SCCM	Mohammédia	Stade El Bachir	11,000
Difaâ El Jadidi	DHJ	El Jadida	Stade El Abdi	15,000
Fath Union Sport	FUS	Rabat	Stade Moulay Hassan	12,000
Hassania Agadir	HUSA	Agadir	Stade Adrar	45,480
Ittihad Tanger	IRT	Tanger	Stade Ibn Batouta	45,000
Jeunesse Sportive Soualem	JSS	Soualem	Stade Errazi in Berrechid	2,000
Maghreb de Fès	MAS	Fes	Fez Stadium	45,000
Mouloudia Oujda	MCO	Oujda	Honneur Stadium	35,000
Nahdat Berkane	RSB	Berkane	Stade Municipal	15,000
Olympique Club de Khouribga	OCK	Khouribga	Complexe OCP	10,000
Olympic Safi	OCS	Safi	Stade El Massira	15,000
Raja Casablanca	RCA	Casablanca	Stade Mohamed V	67,000
Rapide Oued Zem	RCOZ	Oued Zem	Stade Municipal	8,000
Wydad Casablanca	WAC	Casablanca	Stade Mohamed V	67,000
Youssoufia Berrechid	CAYB	Berrechid	Stade Municipal	8,000

=== Personnel and kits ===
Teams	Managers	Captain	Kit manufacturer	Shirt sponsor
AS FAR	(Belgium) Sven Vandenbroeck	(Morocco) Mohamed Rabie Hrimat	(Italy) Erreà	
CAY Berrechid	(Egypt) Mohamed Fathi	(Morocco) Mourad Kaaouach	(Morocco) AB Sport	Dalaa, Ould Bouazza, Alitkane, Or Blanc, Tiger^{1}, Alghalla^{1}, Samir^{2}, Campak^{2}
DH Jadida	(Algeria) Abdelhak Benchikha	(Morocco) El Mehdi Karnass	(Germany) Jako	Ozone, Radio Mars, Mazagan, TGCC^{1}
Fath US	(Morocco) Jamal Sellami	(Morocco) El Mehdi El Bassil	(Germany) Uhlsport	Novec, LafargeHolcim Maroc^{1}
HUS Agadir	(Morocco) Abdelhadi Sektioui	(Morocco) Yassine Rami	(Italy) Legea	Afriquia, Souss-Massa, Agadir, Skoda^{1}, jaouda^{1}, AtlantaSanad^{2}^{3}, Joly^{3}, Moov'up^{3}
IR Tanger	(Spain) Juan Pedro Benali	(Morocco) Ahmad Hamoudan	(Morocco) Gloria	Tanger-Med, Biougnach^{1}
JS Soualem	(Morocco) Zakaria Aboub	(Morocco) Yassine Njima	(Morocco) BHero Sports	Crunchips^{1}
Maghreb AS	(Tunisia) Abdelhay Ben Soltane	(Morocco) Anass Azim	(Morocco) Mexxess	TGCC, Radio Mars, Asta^{1}, Aïn Ifrane^{2}
MC Oujda	(Morocco) Hilal Ettair	(Morocco) Abdellah Khafifi	(Morocco) Bang Sports	Dari^{1}
OC Khouribga	(Morocco) Abdessamad Ouarad	(Morocco) Youssef Oggadi	(Morocco) AB Sport	AB Sport^{1}
OC Safi	(Egypt) Tarek Mostafa	(Morocco) Ahmed Bessak	(Morocco) Bang Sports	Fitco, ocstore.ma^{1}
Raja CA	(Morocco) Bouchaib El Moubarki (interim)	(Morocco) Mouhcine Moutouali	(Italy) Kappa	OLA Energy, Nor'Dar, Sofac^{3}, MarsaMaroc^{1}, Atlanta Sanad^{2}^{3}
RC Oued Zem	(Switzerland) Guglielmo Arena	(Morocco) Mourad Hibour	(Morocco) Bang Sports	
RS Berkane	(Democratic Republic of the Congo) Florent Ibengé	(Morocco) Mohamed Aziz	(Morocco) Bang Sports	Thé Dahmiss, GoldVision^{1}, Afriquia^{1}
SCC Mohammédia	(Morocco) Mohamed Fakhir	(Morocco) Ayoub Adila	(Morocco) Chabab	Vittel^{2}
Wydad AC	(Morocco) Walid Regragui	(Morocco) Yahya Jabrane	(Italy) Macron	Ingelec, Or Blanc^{1}, Alitkane^{2}

1. On the back of shirt.
2. On the sleeves.
3. On the shorts.
Additionally, referee kits are made by Puma.

=== Managerial changes ===
Teams	Outgoing manager	Manner of departure	Date of vacancy	Incoming manager	Date of appointment
Maghreb de Fès	(Tunisia) Fathi Al-Jabal	End of contract	2 August 2021	(Tunisia) Abdelhay Ben Soltane	2 August 2021
Wydad Casablanca	(Tunisia) Faouzi Benzarti	End of contract	3 August 2021	(Morocco) Walid Regragui	10 August 2021
Ittihad Tanger	(Morocco) Driss El Mrabet	Mutual consent	6 August 2021	(France) Bernard Casoni	8 August 2021
Mouloudia Oujda	(France) Bernard Casoni	End of contract	6 August 2021	(Algeria) Nabil Neghiz	12 August 2021
FUS Rabat	(Senegal) Demba Mbaye	End of contract	10 August 2021	(Morocco) Mohamed Amine Benhachem	20 August 2021
Rapide Oued Zem	(Morocco) Fouad Sahabi	Contract termination	21 September 2021	(Tunisia) Mounir Chebil	29 September 2021
Youssoufia Berrechid	(Morocco) Abderrahim Nejjar	Contract termination	2 October 2021	(Egypt) Mohamed Fathi	8 October 2021
Ittihad Tanger	(France) Bernard Casoni	Sacked	2 November 2021	(Morocco) Jaafar R'kyek (interim)	8 August 2021
FUS Rabat	(Morocco) Mohamed Amine Benhachem	Resigned	3 November 2021	(Morocco) Jamal Sellami	13 November 2021
OC Safi	(Morocco) Faouzi Jamal	Sacked	3 November 2021	(Morocco) Abderrahim Talib	11 November 2021
Raja CA	(Tunisia) Lassaad Chabbi	Sacked	9 November 2021	(Belgium) Marc Wilmots	11 November 2021
Rapide Oued Zem	(Tunisia) Mounir Chebil	Sacked	9 November 2021	(Morocco) Abdelkrim Jinani	22 November 2021
OC Khouribga	(Morocco) Abdelaziz Kerkache	Sacked	22 November 2021	(Morocco) Abdessamad Ouarad	23 November 2021
MC Oujda	(Algeria) Nabil Neghiz	Sacked	27 November 2021	(Morocco) Hilal Ettair	9 December 2021
Ittihad Tanger	(Morocco) Jaafar R'kyek (interim)	End of tenure as caretake	30 November 2021	(Argentina) Miguel Ángel Gamondi	30 November 2021
Hassania Agadir	(Morocco) Reda Hakam	Sacked	9 December 2021	(Morocco) Abdelhadi Sektioui	10 December 2021
Raja CA	(Belgium) Marc Wilmots	Mutual consent	20 February 2022	(Morocco) Mohamed El Bekkari (interim)	20 February 2022
Raja CA	(Morocco) Mohamed El Bekkari (interim)	End of tenure as caretake	28 February 2022	(Morocco) Rachid Taoussi	28 February 2022
OC Safi	(Morocco) Abderrahim Talib	Contract termination	21 March 2022	(Egypt) Tarek Mostafa	24 March 2022
Rapide Oued Zem	(Morocco) Abdelkrim Jinani	Mutual consent	2 April 2022	(Switzerland) Guglielmo Arena	12 April 2022
Jeunesse Sportive Soualem	(Morocco) Redouane El Haimer	Resigned	11 April 2022	(Morocco) Zakaria Aboub	19 April 2022
Ittihad Tanger	(Argentina) Miguel Ángel Gamondi	Contract termination	17 April 2022	(Spain) Juan Pedro Benali	18 April 2022
MC Oujda	(Morocco) Hilal Ettair	Mutual consent	10 May 2022	(Morocco) Mounir Jaouani	11 May 2022
Raja CA	(Morocco) Rachid Taoussi	Mutual consent	23 June 2022	(Morocco) Bouchaib El Moubarki (interim)	23 June 2022

=== Foreign players ===
All teams are allowed to register up to five foreign players, but can only use up to three players on the field at the same time.

Players name in bold indicates the player is registered during the mid-season transfer window.

Club	Player 1	Player 2	Player 3	Player 4	Player 5	Former Players
AS FAR	(Cameroon) Lambert Gueme Araina	(Cape Verde) Diney	(South Africa) **Darren Smith**	(Rwanda) Emmanuel Imanishimwe	(Rwanda) **Thierry Manzi**	(Gabon) Abdou Atchabao
Chabab Mohammédia	(Ivory Coast) Hervé Guy	(Cameroon) **Alain Akono**	(Democratic Republic of the Congo) **Arsène Zola**	(Mali) Issouf Traoré	(Togo) **Abdoul Moubarak Aïgba**	(The Gambia) Pa Omar Babou (Nigeria) Adeleke Oluwatobi Babatunde (Yemen) Ahmed Al-Sarori
Difaâ El Jadidi	(Algeria) Karim Chaban	(Burkina Faso) Ismaël Sawadogo	(Democratic Republic of the Congo) Dieumerci Amale	(Kenya) Masoud Juma		(Cameroon) Salomon Bindjeme II
FUS Rabat	(Burkina Faso) Soumaïla Ouattara	(Cameroon) Herman Junior Kameni	(The Gambia) Pa Modou Sohna			(Libya) Mohamed Anis Saltou
Hassania Agadir	(Algeria) **Aziz Benabdi**	(Burkina Faso) Patrick Malo	(Senegal) Birahim Gaye	(Senegal) Djibril Diop	(Senegal) Malick Cisse	(Senegal) Bakary Mané
Ittihad Tanger	(Algeria) Abdellah El Moudene	(Gabon) Axel Meye	(Senegal) Youssoupha Konaté			(France) Pape Paye
Jeunesse Sportive Soualem	(The Gambia) Gibril Sillah	(Mali) Abdoulaye Traoré				
Maghreb de Fès	(Ivory Coast) Banfa Sylla	(Ivory Coast) Oumar Farouk Comara	(Gabon) Abdou Atchabao	(Gabon) Louis Ameka Autchanga	(Mali) Abdoulaye Diarra	(Guinea) Demba Camara (Ivory Coast) Guiza Djédjé
Mouloudia Oujda	(Algeria) **Ali Haroun**	(Botswana) **Mothusi Cooper**	(Ivory Coast) Lamine Diakite	(Cameroon) Ricky Ngatchou	(Guinea) **Demba Camara**	(Ivory Coast) Yaya Meledje (Algeria) Badreddine Souyad (Libya) Shamikh Hamid
Nahdat Berkane	(Burundi) **Fiston Abdul Razak**	(Burkina Faso) Issoufou Dayo	(Democratic Republic of the Congo) Chadrack Lukombe	(Democratic Republic of the Congo) Tuisila Kisinda	(Senegal) Mamadou Lamine Camara	(Zambia) Clatous Chama (Mauritania) Adama Ba
Olympique de Khouribga	(Algeria) Mohamed Walid Bencherifa	(Botswana) Kabelo Seakanyeng	(Botswana) Tumisang Orebonye	(Senegal) Adama Diom		(Burundi) Fiston Abdul Razak (Algeria) Nasreddine Zaalani
Olympic Safi	(Brazil) Cláudio	(Burkina Faso) Djibril Ouattara	(Burkina Faso) **Abdul Draman**	(Ivory Coast) **Yannick Zakri**	(Cameroon) **Aurélien Etamé Ngomé**	(Ivory Coast) Thierry Kassi
Raja Casablanca	(Algeria) Gaya Merbah	(Democratic Republic of the Congo) **Beni Badibanga**	(Democratic Republic of the Congo) Fabrice Ngoma	(Democratic Republic of the Congo) **Kadima Kabangu**	(Guinea) Moustapha Kouyaté	(Burkina Faso) Sami Hien (The Gambia) Gibril Sillah
Rapide Oued Zem	(Burkina Faso) Aliou Chitou Adjibadé	(Ivory Coast) Jean-Baptiste Nangui	(Ivory Coast) Yann Zébré			(Republic of the Congo) Bersyl Obassi
Wydad Casablanca	(Republic of the Congo) Guy Mbenza	(Republic of the Congo) Juvhel Tsoumou	(Ivory Coast) Cheick Comara	(Libya) Muaid Ellafi	(Tanzania) Simon Msuva	
Youssoufia Berrechid	(Ivory Coast) Assane Diabagate	(Mali) **Ousmane Doumbia**				(Ivory Coast) Thomas Gonazo

== League table ==
Pos	Team	Pld	W	D	L	GF	GA	GD	Pts	Qualification or relegation
1	Wydad AC (C)	30	19	6	5	46	24	+22	63	Qualification for Champions League (Note: Wydad AC and Raja CA are participated in the Arab Club Champions Cup group stage.)
2	Raja CA	30	17	9	4	41	21	+20	60	Qualification for Champions League
3	AS FAR	30	13	9	8	38	29	+9	48	Qualification for Confederation Cup (Note: AS FAR is participated in the Arab Club Champions Cup Qualifying round.)
4	Maghreb de Fès	30	9	18	3	28	17	+11	45	
5	Fath Union Sport	30	11	10	9	34	30	+4	43	
6	RS Berkane	30	10	11	9	39	33	+6	41	Qualification for Confederation Cup (Note: RS Berkane qualified for the CAF Confederation Cup as the title holders.)
7	Olympic Safi	30	9	12	9	29	27	+2	39	
8	Difaâ El Jadidi	30	9	11	10	32	40	−8	38	
9	Jeunesse Sportive Soualem	30	9	9	12	37	38	−1	36 (Note: Head-to-head: Chabab Soualem: 4 points, Olympique Khouribga: 1 point.)	
10	Olympique Khouribga	30	8	12	10	32	37	−5	36	
11	SCC Mohammédia	30	8	10	12	27	32	−5	34 (Note: Head-to-head: Chabab Mohammédia: 6 points, Hassania Agadir: 0 point.)	
12	Hassania Agadir	30	9	7	14	26	30	−4	34	
13	Ittihad Tanger	30	8	9	13	31	41	−10	33 (Note: Head-to-head: Ittihad Tanger: 4 points, Mouloudia Oujda: 1 point.)	
14	MC Oujda	30	7	12	11	35	38	−3	33	
15	Rapide Oued Zem (R)	30	7	8	15	19	39	−20	29	Relegation to Botola 2
16	Youssoufia Berrechid (R)	30	5	11	14	25	43	−18	26	Relegation to Botola 2

Source: FRMF.ma
Rules for classification: 1) Points; 2a) Head-to-head goal difference if they are two teams with equal points; 2b) Goal difference if they are more than two teams with equal points; 3) Number of wins; 4) Goals scored; 5) Play-off between involved teams.
(C) Champions; (R) Relegated

== Results ==
Home \ Away	CAYB	DHJ	FAR	FUS	HUSA	IRT	JSS	MAS	MCO	OCK	OCS	RCA	RCOZ	RSB	SCCM	WAC
CAY Berrechid	—	3–2	0–1	1–2	0–1	0–3	1–1	0–0	1–0	0–0	0–0	0–1	2–1	0–4	2–0	0–0
DH Jadidi	1–0	—	0–0	0–2	2–1	2–2	3–2	0–0	1–1	0–0	1–0	0–2	2–0	1–1	0–0	2–1
AS FAR	2–1	3–1	—	1–1	2–1	4–1	0–3	0–0	0–3	1–0	1–1	1–1	3–1	1–1	1–0	0–1
Fath US	1–1	2–2	2–1	—	0–0	2–1	1–0	1–1	0–0	1–2	0–1	0–1	0–2	2–0	2–0	3–2
HUS Agadir	1–0	0–0	1–2	2–1	—	0–0	0–0	1–2	1–2	1–2	2–2	2–3	1–0	2–0	0–1	0–1
IR Tanger	1–1	4–2	0–2	1–1	1–0	—	2–1	1–1	1–1	0–2	1–0	0–1	3–1	0–0	1–1	0–0
JS Soualem	1–2	2–0	1–1	1–0	2–3	0–2	—	3–0	0–0	2–1	2–1	0–1	1–1	0–0	2–1	3–4
Maghreb AS	3–0	3–0	0–0	1–1	1–0	2–1	0–0	—	1–0	2–0	1–1	0–0	1–1	0–0	1–1	1–1
MC Oujda	1–1	1–1	0–2	1–2	0–0	2–3	2–4	2–1	—	3–2	3–1	1–3	1–1	2–1	1–1	2–2
OC Khouribga	3–3	2–2	2–1	1–1	2–0	1–0	0–0	0–0	0–0	—	1–4	2–2	1–1	1–0	0–0	0–3
OC Safi	3–2	0–1	0–0	2–1	1–2	3–1	0–0	0–0	1–1	2–1	—	1–0	0–0	0–0	0–0	0–1
Raja CA	1–1	2–0	2–1	1–1	1–0	1–0	3–0	1–1	2–0	2–1	2–3	—	0–0	1–2	2–1	2–0
RC Oued Zem	0–0	0–1	0–3	0–2	0–2	1–0	0–2	0–2	1–0	1–2	1–0	1–0	—	3–2	0–0	0–2
RS Berkane	4–1	3–2	2–1	1–0	0–0	4–1	4–3	0–0	1–0	3–3	1–1	1–2	0–1	—	3–1	0–1
SCC Mohammédia	2–0	1–2	0–3	2–0	2–0	3–0	2–1	1–3	0–3	1–0	0–1	0–0	4–1	1–1	—	0–0
Wydad AC	3–2	2–1	3–0	1–2	0–2	2–0	3–0	1–0	3–2	1–0	1–0	1–1	2–0	2–0	2–1	—

Updated to match(es) played on 5 July 2022. Source: Goalzz
Legend: Blue = home team win; Yellow = draw; Red = away team win.
For upcoming matches, an "a" indicates there is an article about the rivalry between the two participants.

=== Positions by round ===
The table lists the positions of teams after each week of matches.

Team ╲ Round	1	2	3	4	5	6	7	8	9	10	11	12	13	14	15	16	17	18	19	20	21	22	23	24	25	26	27	28	29	30
Wydad AC	3	2	2	1	1	1	1	1	1	1	1	1	1	1	1	1	1	1	1	1	1	1	1	1	1	1	1	1	1	1
Raja Casablanca	5	4	1	2	2	2	2	2	2	2	2	2	2	2	2	2	2	2	2	2	2	2	2	2	2	2	2	2	2	2
ASFAR	16	7	8	8	9	5	7	6	5	4	5	3	3	3	3	4	6	8	4	7	3	4	3	3	3	3	3	3	3	3
Maghreb de Fès	9	15	14	14	11	6	4	7	7	8	6	6	7	4	7	7	7	6	5	4	4	5	5	4	4	4	4	4	4	4
Fath Union Sport	15	13	12	13	15	14	14	14	15	14	15	15	13	12	11	9	8	7	9	5	9	11	11	6	7	5	5	5	5	5
RS Berkane	10	8	10	12	6	7	6	5	4	5	3	5	6	7	6	6	4	4	3	6	8	3	6	7	5	6	7	7	6	6
Olympic Club de Safi	11	10	11	6	8	12	12	11	12	12	13	11	12	11	13	13	13	15	15	15	15	13	13	13	13	13	11	8	7	7
Difaâ Hassani El Jadidi	4	3	3	3	3	3	3	3	6	6	7	8	4	6	5	3	3	3	6	3	5	7	9	9	10	9	10	11	10	8
Jeunesse Soualem	1	1	4	4	4	4	5	4	3	3	4	4	5	5	4	5	5	5	7	8	9	8	8	10	9	10	8	9	9	9
Olympique Khouribga	7	9	7	10	10	10	10	9	10	11	10	10	10	13	12	12	11	10	10	10	10	6	7	8	8	8	6	6	8	10
SCC Mohammédia	2	5	5	5	7	11	11	8	8	7	8	7	8	9	9	11	9	9	8	9	6	10	4	5	6	7	9	10	11	11
Hassania Agadir	6	6	9	11	13	13	9	13	9	10	12	13	14	14	14	14	15	14	11	12	11	9	10	11	11	11	13	13	12	12
Ittihad Tanger	14	12	15	16	12	15	15	15	14	15	11	9	9	10	8	8	10	11	12	11	12	12	12	12	12	12	12	12	13	13
Mouloudia Oujda	8	14	13	7	5	8	8	10	11	13	14	14	15	15	15	15	14	12	14	14	14	15	14	14	14	14	14	14	14	14
Rapide Oued Zem	13	16	16	15	16	16	16	16	16	16	16	16	16	16	16	16	16	16	16	16	16	16	16	16	16	16	16	16	15	15
Youssoufia Berrechid	12	11	6	9	14	9	13	12	13	9	9	12	11	8	10	10	12	13	13	13	13	14	15	15	15	15	15	15	16	16

Leader and CAF Champions League
CAF Champions League
CAF Confederation Cup
CAF Confederation Cup
Relegation to Botola 2

Source: Botola

== Season statistics ==
=== Top goalscorers ===
As of 5 July 2022

Rank	Player	Club	Goals
1	(Republic of the Congo) Guy Mbenza	Wydad AC	16
2	(Gabon) Axel Meye	IR Tanger	12
3	(Ivory Coast) Lamine Diakite	MC Oujda	11
4	(Democratic Republic of the Congo) Chadrack Lukombe	RS Berkane	10
5	(Morocco) Ismail Khafi	AS FAR	9
5	(Morocco) Youssef Mehri	HUS Agadir	9
5	(Morocco) Mohsine Moutouali	Raja CA	9
8	(Morocco) Reda Hajhouj	Fath US	8
8	(Morocco) Oussama Lamlioui	SCC Mohammédia	8
8	(Morocco) Hamza Khabba	OC Safi	8
8	(Botswana) Kabelo Seakanyeng	OC Khouribga	8
8	(Morocco) Soufiane Benjdida	Raja CA	8

=== Hat-tricks ===
Player	For	Against	Result	Date	Round
(Gabon) Axel Meye	IR Tanger	OC Khouribga	3–1	21 December 2021	11

(H) – Home; (A) – Away
^{4} – Player scored four goals.

=== Clean Sheets ===
As of 5 July 2022

Rank	Player	Club	Clean sheets
1	(Morocco) Ahmed Reda Tagnaouti	Wydad AC	17
2	(Morocco) Aymane Majid	Maghreb AS	15
3	(Morocco) Youssef El Motie	SCC Mohammédia	11
4	(Morocco) Anas Zniti	Raja CA	10
4	(Morocco) Ayoub Lakred	AS FAR	10
4	(Morocco) Mokhtar Majid	OC Safi	10
7	(Morocco) Mehdi El Jourbaoui	HUS Agadir	7
7	(Morocco) Mohamed Ferni	OC Khouribga	7
7	(Morocco) El Mehdi Benabid	Fath US	7
7	(Morocco) Hicham El Allouch	JS Soualem	7

=== Goals-to-Games Ratio ===
As of 5 July 2022

Rank	Name	Club	Goals Against	Matches	Average
1	(Morocco) Aymane Majid	Maghreb AS	14	28	0.5
2	(Morocco) Ahmed Reda Tagnaouti	Wydad AC	19	27	0.70
3	(Morocco) Anas Zniti	Raja CA	15	21	0.71
4	(Morocco) Mokhtar Majid	OC Safi	25	29	0.86
5	(Morocco) El Mehdi Benabid	Fath US	20	23	0.87

=== Scoring ===
First goal of the season:

- (Morocco) Houssine Rahimi for Raja CA against Youssoufia Berrechid (10 September 2021)

Last goal of the season:

- (Morocco) Brahim El Bahraoui for Nahdat Berkane against Youssoufia Berrechid (4 July 2022)

=== Discipline ===
As of 5 July 2022

==== Player ====
- Most yellow cards: 9
  - (Morocco) Marouane Louadni (RC Oued Zem)
  - (Morocco) Mehdi Attouchi (OC Safi)
  - (Morocco) Ayman El Hassouni (Wydad AC)
- Most red cards: 3
  - (Morocco) Mohamed El Jaaouani (DH Jadidi)

==== Club ====
- Most yellow cards: 77
  - JS Soualem
- Most red cards: 7
  - DH Jadidi
- Fewest yellow cards: 38
  - SCC Mohammédia
- Fewest red cards: 0
  - SCC Mohammédia
  - Maghreb AS

== Annual awards ==
The UMFP (Union Marocaine des Footballeurs Professionnels), in partnership with the Royal Moroccan Football Federation, organized the Night of Stars Award in its 8th edition, which celebrated the brilliants of the Botola Pro for the 2021/22 season.

Award	Winner	Club
Manager of the Season	(Morocco) Walid Regragui	Wydad AC
Player of the Season	(Morocco) Yahya Jabrane	Wydad AC
Foreign Player of the Season	(Burkina Faso) Issoufou Dayo	RS Berkane
Promising Player of the Season	(Morocco) Mehdi Moubarik	Fath US
Goalkeeper of the Season	(Morocco) Anas Zniti	Raja CA
Referee of the Season	(Morocco) Redouane Jiyed	
Club of the Season	Wydad AC	

Team of the Season
Goalkeeper	(Morocco) Majid Aymane (FUS Rabat)			
Defence	(Morocco) Mohamed Chibi (AS FAR)	(Morocco) Achraf Dari (Wydad AC)	(Morocco) Jamal Harkass (Raja CA)	(Morocco) Yahia Attiyat Allah (Wydad AC)
Midfield	(Morocco) Yassine Labhiri (MC Oudja)	(Morocco) Yahya Jabrane (Wydad AC)		(Morocco) Mohamed Al Makahasi (Raja CA)
Attack	(Morocco) Reda Hajhouj (Al Faisaly)	(Republic of the Congo) Guy Mbenza (Wydad AC)		(Botswana) Kabelo Seakanyeng (OC Khourigba)

== See also ==
- 2021–22 Botola 2
- 2021–22 CAF Champions League
- 2021–22 CAF Confederation Cup
- 2021–22 Moroccan Amateur National Championship
- 2020–21 Moroccan Throne Cup
