= Oula Abass Traoré =

Burkinabé footballer

Personal information
- Date of birth: 29 September 1995 (age 31)
- Place of birth: Bobo-Dioulasso, Burkina Faso
- Height: 1.80 m (5 ft 11 in)
- Position: Left-back

Team information
- Current team: AS Douanes (BFA)

Youth career
- Rahimo FC

Senior career*
Years	Team	Apps	(Gls)
2014–2017	RC Bobo Dioulasso		
2017–2020	Salitas		
2020–2022	Horoya AC		
2023	Lviv	3	(0)
2024–	AS Douanes (BFA)		

International career^{‡}
2019–	Burkina Faso	8	(0)
- * Club domestic league appearances and goals as of 21 March 2024 ‡ National team caps and goals as of 29 November 2024

Oula Abass Traoré (born 29 September 1995) is a Burkinabé professional footballer who plays as a left-back for AS Douanes (BFA) and the Burkina Faso national team.

== International career ==
Traoré made his debut for the Burkina Faso national team in a 0–0 friendly tie with the DR Congo on 9 June 2019.
