= Amine Farhane =

Moroccan footballer (born 1998)

Personal information
- Full name: Amine Farhane
- Date of birth: 23 March 1998 (age 28)
- Place of birth: Morocco
- Height: 1.89 m (6 ft 2 in)
- Position: Defender

Team information
- Current team: Wydad AC
- Number: 25

Senior career*
Years	Team	Apps	(Gls)
- Wydad Temara
2020–	Wydad AC	36	(3)
- * Club domestic league appearances and goals as of 1 July 2023

Amine Farhane (Arabic: أمين فرحان; born 23 March 1998) is a Moroccan professional footballer who plays as a defender for Botola club Wydad AC. He joined from lower-division side Wydad Temara.

== Honours ==
Wydad AC

- Botola: 2020–21, 2021-22
- CAF Champions League: 2021–22'
