= Karim Chaban =

Moroccan footballer (born 2000)

Personal information
- Full name: Karim Mohmet Chaban
- Date of birth: 6 January 2000 (age 26)
- Place of birth: Marseille, France
- Height: 1.82 m (6 ft 0 in)
- Position: Winger

Team information
- Current team: CS Constantine
- Number: 18

Youth career
- 2010–2017: SC Air Bel
- 2017–2018: Marseille
- 2018: Anderlecht
- 2018–2019: Gazélec Ajaccio

Senior career*
| Years | Team | Apps | (Gls) |
| 2019–2020 | Câmara Lobos | 10 | (1) |
| 2020–2021 | Águilas | 12 | (1) |
| 2021 | UCAM Murcia B | 14 | (3) |
| 2021–2022 | Difaâ Hassani El Jadidi | 3 | (0) |
| 2022–2023 | Albacete B | 21 | (16) |
| 2022–2023 | Albacete | 2 | (0) |
| 2024–2025 | Gazélec Ajaccio | 0 | (0) |
| 2025 | Istres | 11 | (0) |
| 2025–2026 | Aubagne Air Bel | 20 | (4) |
| 2026– | CS Constantine | 0 | (0) |

International career
| 2018 | Algeria U18 | 2 | (0) |
- * Club domestic league appearances and goals as of 29 July 2026

Karim Mohmet Chaban (born 6 January 2000) is a professional footballer who plays as a winger for CS Constantine. Born in France, he represented Algeria internationally on junior level.

== Club career ==
Born in Marseille to Algerian parents from Oran, Chaban joined Olympique de Marseille's youth categories in 2017, from SC Air Bel. In March 2018, he agreed to a contract with RSC Anderlecht, but returned to his home country in August after signing for Gazélec Ajaccio.

In 2019, Chaban joined Portuguese side CSD Câmara de Lobos, and made his senior debut with the club in the Campeonato de Portugal. In February of the following year, he signed for Tercera División side Águilas FC.

On 4 August 2020, Chaban renewed with Águilas, but moved to UCAM Murcia CF the following 19 January, being initially assigned to the reserves in Tercera División RFEF. On 14 April 2021, he renewed his contract with the latter club until 2023, but left the club in August after not being involved with the main squad, and subsequently joined Moroccan side Difaâ El Jadida.

In 2022, after featuring rarely, Chaban returned to Spain and signed for Albacete Balompié's B-team in the regional leagues. He made his first team debut on 23 October of that year, coming on as a late substitute for Jonathan Dubasin in a 1–1 Segunda División away draw against SD Eibar.

On 29 July 2026, after representing French sides Gazélec Ajaccio, Istres and Aubagne Air Bel, Chaban joined Algerian club CS Constantine.
