= Ayman El Hassouni =

Moroccan footballer

Personal information
- Full name: Ayman El Hassouni
- Date of birth: 22 February 1995 (age 31)
- Place of birth: Casablanca, Morocco
- Height: 1.87 m (6 ft 2 in)
- Position: Winger

Team information
- Current team: Asswehly
- Number: 7

Senior career*
Years	Team	Apps	(Gls)
2014–2023	Wydad AC	237	(28)
2017	→ OCK (loan)	9	(4)
2023–2024	Muaither	21	(6)
2024–2025	Ajman	4	(0)
2025–	Asswehly	0	(0)

International career^{‡}
2012	Morocco U20	13	(2)
2014–2015	Morocco U23	4	(0)
2021–	Morocco A'	3	(0)
- * Club domestic league appearances and goals ‡ National team caps and goals as of 11 December 2021

Ayman El Hassouni (Arabic: أيمن الحسوني; born 22 February 1995) is a Moroccan footballer who plays for Asswehly as a winger.

== International career ==
He made his debut for the Morocco national football team on 1 December 2021 in a 2021 FIFA Arab Cup game against Palestine.

== Honours ==
=== Club ===
Wydad AC

- Botola: 2014–15, 2016–17, 2018–19, 2020–21, 2021–22
- CAF Champions League: 2021–22
- CAF Super Cup: 2018
