= Aissa Sioudi =

French professional footballer

Personal information
- Date of birth: 20 September 1997 (age 29)
- Place of birth: Morocco
- Position: Goalkeeper

Team information
- Current team: Wydad AC

Senior career*
Years	Team	Apps	(Gls)
2017–2018	MAT Tetouan		(0)
2018–2019	Chabab Rif Al Hoceima	1	(0)
2019	Raja Beni Mellal		(0)
2019–2020	SCC Mohammédia		(0)
2020–	Wydad AC	5	(0)
2022	→ IR Tanger (loan)	7	(0)

International career
2019	Morocco U23	2	
- * Club domestic league appearances and goals as of 27 January 2023

Aissa Sioudi is a Moroccan professional footballer who plays as a goalkeeper for Wydad AC.
