= Ayoub Skouma =

Moroccan footballer

Personal information
- Full name: Ayoub Skouma
- Date of birth: March 22, 1987 (age 39)
- Place of birth: Casablanca, Morocco
- Height: 1.73 m (5 ft 8 in)
- Position: Midfielder

Youth career
- 2004–2006: Wydad AC

Senior career*
Years	Team	Apps	(Gls)
2007–2013	Wydad AC	52	(7)
2013	Khaitan		
2013–2014	Ittihad Khemisset		
2014–2015	Difaâ El Jadida		
2015–2020	FUS Rabat	120	(12)
2020–2022	Wydad AC	8	(0)

International career^{‡}
2011	Morocco	0	(0)
- * Club domestic league appearances and goals as of April 16, 2009 ‡ National team caps and goals as of October 17, 2011

Ayoub Skouma (born 22 March 1987 in Casablanca) is a Moroccan footballer.

== Career ==
On 4 July 2009 had a trial with Standard Liège the transfer fee of the Wydad AC player is €800,000.
