= Hamza Asrir =

Moroccan professional footballer

Personal information
- Date of birth: 12 May 1993 (age 33)
- Place of birth: Morocco
- Position: Defender

Team information
- Current team: Al Ta'awon

Youth career
- –2019: Wydad AC

Senior career*
Years	Team	Apps	(Gls)
2012–2014	IZK		
2014–2015	MC Oujda	25	(1)
2019–2023	Wydad AC	28	(1)
2023–2024	Olympique Khouribga	4	(0)
2024–2025	Al-Batnan	0	(0)
2025–2026	Al-Baqa'a	5	(0)
2026–	Al Ta'awon	0	(0)
- * Club domestic league appearances and goals as of 15 March 2026

Hamza Asrir is a Moroccan professional footballer who plays as a defender for Libyan Premier League club Al Ta'awon.
