= Soufiane Karkache =

Belgian-born Moroccan footballer

Personal information
- Date of birth: 2 July 1999 (age 27)
- Place of birth: Brussels, Belgium
- Height: 1.78 m (5 ft 10 in)
- Position: Centre back

Team information
- Current team: Olympique Khouribga
- Number: 99

Youth career
- Efj Molenbeek
- Union Saint-Gilloise
- Anderlecht
- 2015–2018: Club Brugge

Senior career*
Years	Team	Apps	(Gls)
2018–2019	MC Oujda	21	(3)
2019	RS Berkane	5	(0)
2020–	Wydad AC	2	(0)

International career
2014–2015	Belgium U16	7	(9)
2015	Belgium U17	4	(0)
2016–2017	Belgium U18	4	(0)
2017	Belgium U19	1	(0)
- * Club domestic league appearances and goals

Soufiane Karkache (born 2 July 1999) is a Belgian-Moroccan footballer who plays for Olympique Khouribga.

== Early years ==
Born in Brussels, Soufiane grew up in Molenbeek-Saint-Jean with his mom and dad, from France and Morocco, respectively. His father, Abdelaziz Karkache, is a former football player and later manager, who played in Belgium. Soufiane joined the RWDM Brussels, formerly known as Efj Molenbeek, at a very young age before joining the Union Saint-Gilloise, and then Anderlecht.

== Club career ==
=== Club Brugge ===
Karkache joined Club Brugge in 2015. During his time at Brugge, Karkache attracted interest from a lot of clubs, including LOSC Lille and West Bromwich Albion.

=== Morocco ===
For personal reasons, Karkache left Belgium and moved father's hometown, Oujda, where he grew up. He signed with MC Oujda, where his father, Abdelaziz, at the time was the head coach of. Despite interest from two clubs at the end of the 2018–19 season, both from Ligue 1 and the Belgian First Division A, Karkache decided to stay in Morocco and joined RS Berkane.

At the end of December 2019, he signed with Wydad AC.
