= Lamine Diakite =

Ivorian footballer

Personal information
- Full name: Lamine Diakité
- Date of birth: 15 June 1991 (age 35)
- Place of birth: Ouragahio, Ivory Coast
- Height: 1.79 m (5 ft 10 1/2 in)
- Position: Midfielder

Team information
- Current team: AS FAR
- Number: 33

Senior career*
Years	Team	Apps	(Gls)
2014–2017	DHJ	62	(4)
2017–2019	FUS Rabat	39	(7)
2019–	MC Oujda	75	(20)
2015–	AS FAR		
- * Club domestic league appearances and goals

Lamine Diakite (born 15 June 1991) is an Ivorian professional footballer who has played for the Ivory Coast national football team. He plays as a midfielder. In 2017, he joined FUS Rabat in Morocco on a three-year contract. As of 2022, he was playing for Rabat football club AS FAR in the Botola Pro league.
