= Yahya Jabrane =

Moroccan footballer

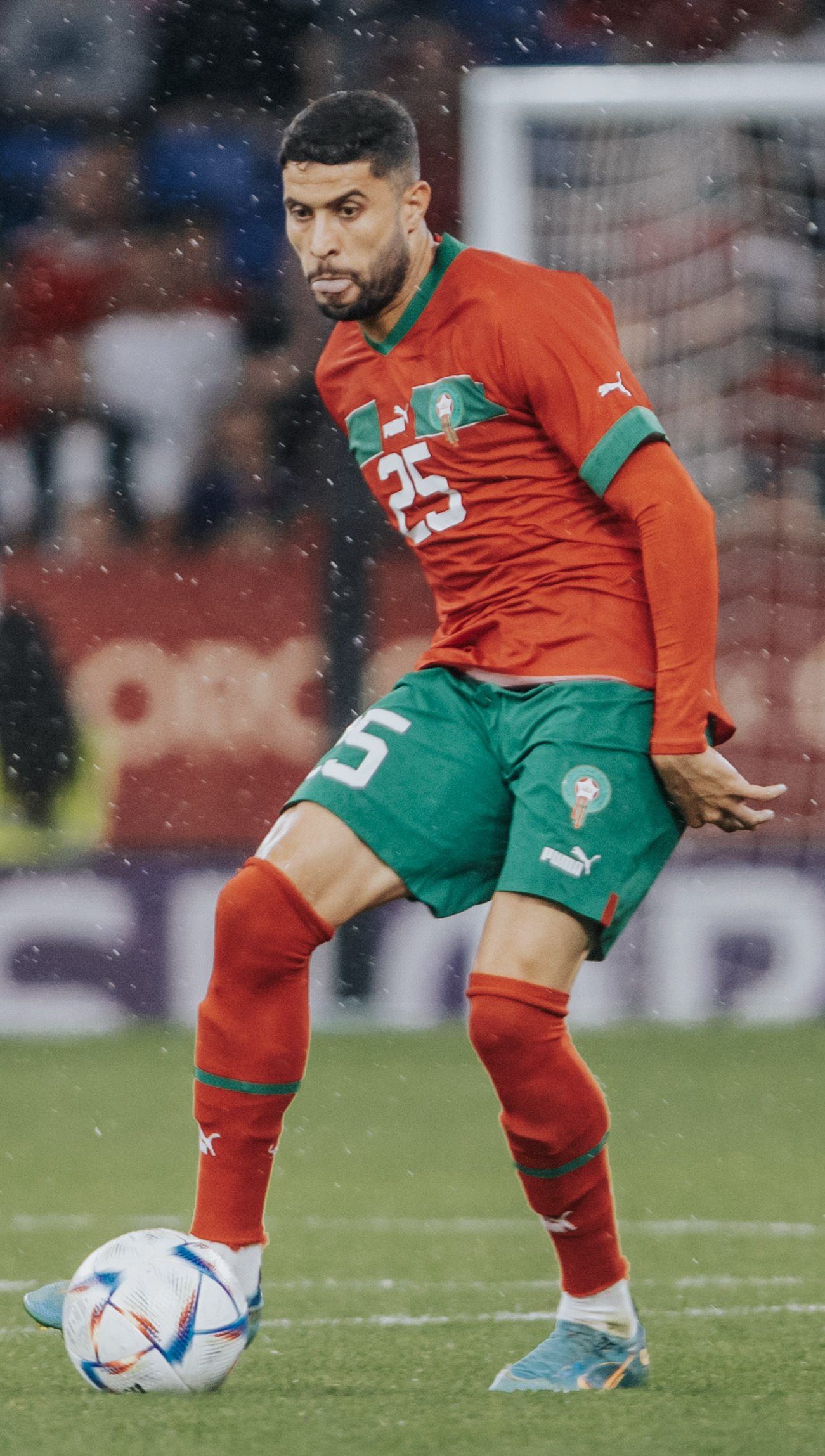
- Jabrane with Morocco in 2022

Personal information
- Full name: Yahya Jabrane
- Date of birth: 18 June 1991 (age 35)
- Place of birth: Settat, Morocco
- Height: 1.83 m (6 ft 0 in)
- Position: Defensive midfielder

Team information
- Current team: Ajman
- Number: 56

Senior career*
Years	Team	Apps	(Gls)
2013–2015	Raja Beni Mellal	10	(0)
2015–2016	MC Oujda	27	(1)
2016–2018	Hassania Agadir	53	(1)
2018–2019	Dibba Al-Fujairah	10	(1)
2019–2024	Wydad AC	137	(20)
2024–2025	Kuwait SC	20	(10)
2025	Al-Ahly Benghazi	5	(1)
2026–	Ajman	1	(0)

International career
2012	Morocco Futsal	3	(1)
2017–2023	Morocco A'	7	(2)
2021–2023	Morocco	8	(0)
Medal record
Men's football
Representing Morocco
African Nations Championship
Winner	2018 Morocco
Winner	2020 Cameroon
- * Club domestic league appearances and goals

Yahya Jabrane (Arabic: يحيى جبران; born 18 June 1991) is a Moroccan professional footballer who plays as a defensive midfielder for UAE Pro League club Ajman.

== Club career ==
On 30 June 2022, Jabrane was nominated for the 2022 CAF inter club player of the year awards.

In the inaugural season of the African Football League, Jabrane scored the first goal for wydad in a 1–0 away victory against Enyimba, the team later defeated them 3–0 at home, thus qualifying them to the semi-final .

On 1 November 2023, Jabrane was nominated for the 2023 African Footballer of the Year and 2023 Interclub Player of the Year by CAF.

== International career ==
On 10 November 2022, Jabrane was named in Morocco's 26-man squad for the 2022 FIFA World Cup in Qatar.

== Career statistics ==
=== Football ===
Scores and results list Morocco's goal tally first.

No.	Date	Venue	Opponent	Score	Result	Competition
1.	18 January 2021	Stade de la Réunification, Douala, Cameroon	Togo	1–0	1–0	2020 African Nations Championship
2.	4 December 2021	Ahmed bin Ali Stadium, Al Rayyan, Qatar	Jordan	1–0	4–0	2021 FIFA Arab Cup

=== Futsal ===
No.	Date	Venue	Opponent	Score	Result	Competition
1.	2 November 2012	Indoor Stadium Huamark, Bangkok, Thailand	Panama	0–1	8–3	2012 FIFA Futsal World Cup

== Honours ==
Wydad AC

- Botola Pro: 2018–19, 2020–21, 2021–22
- CAF Champions League: 2021-22; runner-up: 2018-19, 2022-23
- African Football League runner-up: 2023

Kuwait SC

- Kuwaiti Premier League: 2024–25
- Kuwait Crown Prince Cup: 2024–25
- Kuwait Super Cup: 2024–25

Morocco

- African Nations Championship: 2018, 2020

Individual

- African Nations Championship Team of the Tournament: 2020
- Botola Pro Player of the Season: 2022
- Botola Pro Team of the Season: 2020–21, 2021–22

Orders

- Order of the Throne: 2022
