= Achraf Dari =

Moroccan footballer (born 1999)

Achraf Dari أشرف داري
Personal information
- Full name: Ashraf Zouhair Dari
- Date of birth: 6 May 1999 (age 27)
- Place of birth: Casablanca, Morocco
- Height: 1.88 m (6 ft 2 in)
- Position: Centre-back

Team information
- Current team: Al Ahly
- Number: 3

Youth career
- 2007–2018: Wydad AC

Senior career*
Years	Team	Apps	(Gls)
2017–2022	Wydad AC	90	(8)
2022–2024	Brest	22	(1)
2024	→ Charleroi (loan)	9	(3)
2024–	Al Ahly	13	(0)
2026	→ Kalmar (loan)	9	(1)

International career
2017	Morocco U20	5	(1)
2018	Morocco U23	5	(1)
2021–2022	Morocco A'	2	(1)
2021–2024	Morocco	7	(1)
Medal record
Representing Morocco
Jeux de la Francophonie
Winner	2017 Ivory Coast
- * Club domestic league appearances and goals as of 11 October 2026 (UTC)

Achraf Zouhair Dari (Arabic: أشرف داري; born 6 May 1999) is a Moroccan professional footballer who plays as a centre-back for Egyptian Premier League club Al Ahly.

Dari started his youth footballing career playing for Wydad AC in 2007, later becoming a graduate and making his debut for the club in 2017, before moving to French Ligue 1 side Brest in 2022.

Dari represented Morocco at various youth levels, before making his international debut in 2021. He was chosen in Morocco's squads for the FIFA Arab Cup in 2021.

== Club career ==
=== Wydad ===
Dari began his professional football career with Wydad AC. On 31 May 2022, Dari won his first international trophy with Wydad after defeating Al Ahly 2–0 in 2022 CAF Champions League Final. On 30 June 2022, Dari was nominated for the CAF inter club player of the year awards.

=== Brest ===
On 30 July 2022, Dari signed for Ligue 1 club Brest on a four-year contract. The transfer fee paid to Wydad AC was reported to be in the region of €2.7 million. On 7 August 2022, Dari made his debut against RC Lens. On 21 August, Dari scored his first professional goal for the club in a 3–1 victory against Angers SCO.

On 1 February 2024, Dari joined Charleroi in Belgium on loan.

=== Al Ahly ===
On 28 August 2024, Dari joined Egyptian Premier League club Al Ahly.

== International career ==
Dari made his debut for the Morocco A' national team in a 1–0 win over Saudi Arabia at the 2021 FIFA Arab Cup. On 12 June 2022, Vahid Halilhodžić summoned Dari to the Morocco senior football team. He made his debut in a 2–0 victory against Liberia in the 2023 Africa Cup of Nations qualification that took place in the Stade Mohammed V.

In September 2022, Dari was called up to join the Morocco national team to take part in friendly matches against Chile and Paraguay.

On 10 November 2022, he was named in Morocco's 23-man squad for the 2022 FIFA World Cup in Qatar. On 17 December, he scored his first international goal in the World Cup third-place playoff against Croatia, which ended in a 2–1 defeat.

== Career statistics ==
=== Club ===
As of match played 4 May 2024

Appearances and goals by club, season and competition
Club	Season	League			Cup		Continental		Other		Total	
Club	Season	Division	Apps	Goals	Apps	Goals	Apps	Goals	Apps	Goals	Apps	Goals
Wydad AC	2017–18	Botola	3	0	3	0	0	0	0	0	6	0
Wydad AC	2018–19	Botola	26	3	1	0	13 (Note: Appearances in the CAF Champions League)	0	0	0	40	3
Wydad AC	2019–20	Botola	9	0	0	0	4	0	0	0	13	0
Wydad AC	2020–21	Botola	26	3	4	0	10	0	0	0	40	3
Wydad AC	2021–22	Botola	26	2	2	0	13	3	0	0	41	5
Wydad AC	Total		90	8	10	0	40	3	0	0	140	11
Brest	2022–23	Ligue 1	18	1	2	0	—		—		20	1
Brest	2023–24	Ligue 1	4	0	0	0	—		—		4	0
Brest	Total		22	1	2	0	—		—		24	1
Charleroi (loan)	2023–24	Belgian Pro League	9	3	0	0	—		—		9	3
Career total			121	12	12	0	40	3	0	0	173	15

=== International ===
As of match played 17 December 2022

Appearances and goals by national team and year
National team	Year	Apps	Goals
Morocco	2021	1	0
Morocco	2022	6	1
Total		7	1

Scores and results list goal tally first, score column indicates score after each Dari goal.

List of international goals scored by Achraf Dari
No.	Date	Venue	Opponent	Score	Result	Competition
1	17 December 2022	Khalifa International Stadium, Al Rayyan, Qatar	Croatia	1–1	1–2	2022 FIFA World Cup

== Honours ==
Wydad AC

- Botola Pro: 2018–19, 2020–21, 2021–22
- CAF Champions League : 2021–22; runner-up: 2018–19

Al Ahly

- Egyptian Premier League: 2024–25
- Egyptian Super Cup: 2024

Morocco U20

- Jeux de la Francophonie: 2017

Individual

- Botola Pro Defender of the Season: 2020–21
- Botola Pro Team of the Season: 2020–21, 2021–22
- CAF Champions League Best Defender: 2021–22

Orders

- Order of the Throne: 2022
