= Mohamed Rahim (footballer) =

French professional footballer

Personal information
- Date of birth: 1 February 1995 (age 31)
- Place of birth: Morocco
- Position: Defender

Team information
- Current team: Wydad AC
- Number: 24

Youth career
- –2019: Wydad AC

Senior career*
Years	Team	Apps	(Gls)
2019	TAS de Casablanca		
2019-2020	Chabab Mohamedia		
2020	→ Wydad AC (loan)	5	(0)
2020	Wydad AC	22	(0)
- * Club domestic league appearances and goals as of 18 April 2020

Mohamed Rahim is a Moroccan professional footballer who plays as a defender. The player had played 2020 Semi Final Champions League where he was loaned to Wydad AC for 3 months . In the beginning of 2021 season Rahim came back to his home team for 4 years contract
