= Dieumerci Amale =

Congolese footballer (born 1998)

Personal information
- Full name: Dieumerci Mukoko Amale
- Date of birth: 17 July 1998 (age 28)
- Place of birth: Kinshasa, DR Congo
- Height: 1.76 m (5 ft 9 in)
- Position: Right-back

Team information
- Current team: Saint-Éloi Lupopo

Youth career
- –2018: Vita Club

Senior career*
Years	Team	Apps	(Gls)
2015–2020	DCMP	46	(2)
2020–2023	DHJ	74	(0)
2023–2024	Aigles du Congo		
2024–2025	Youssoufia Berrechid		
2025–	Saint-Éloi Lupopo		

International career^{‡}
2019–	DR Congo	23	(0)
- * Club domestic league appearances and goals as of 12 March 2021 ‡ National team caps and goals as of 18 February 2026

Dieumerci Mukoko Amale (born 17 July 1998) is a Congolese professional footballer who plays as a right-back for Saint-Éloi Lupopo. He plays for the DR Congo national team.

== Playing career ==
Amale spent his early career playing for DCMP in his native DR Congo. He moved to the Moroccan club DHJ on 5 November 2020.

== International career ==
Amale debuted with the DR Congo in a 3–2 friendly loss to Rwanda on 18 September 2019.
