= Ahmed Reda Tagnaouti =

Moroccan footballer (born 1996)

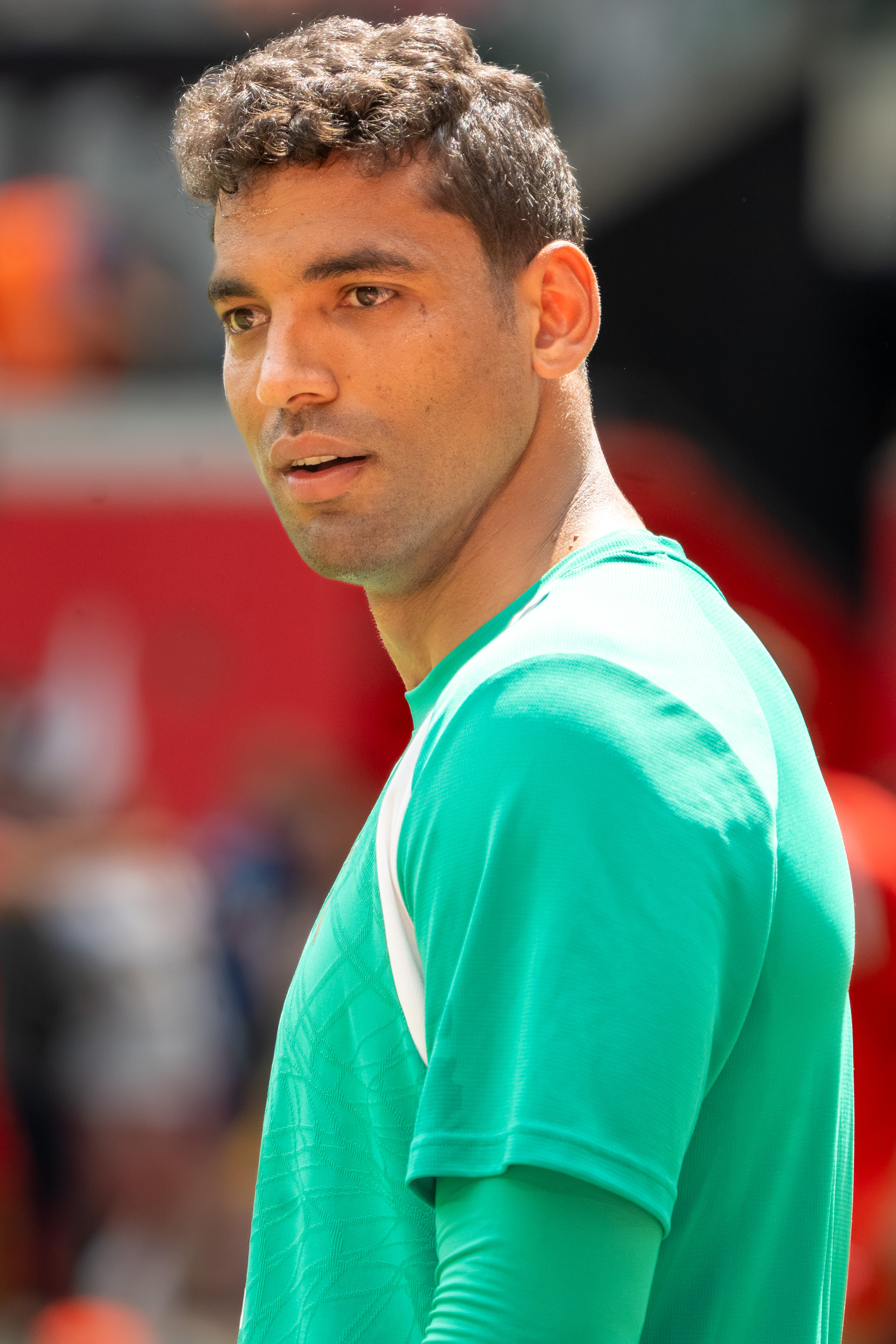
- Tagnaouti with Morocco in 2026

Personal information
- Full name: Ahmed Reda Tagnaouti
- Date of birth: 5 April 1996 (age 30)
- Place of birth: Fes, Morocco
- Height: 1.92 m (6 ft 4 in)
- Position: Goalkeeper

Team information
- Current team: AS FAR
- Number: 16

Youth career
- 2014–2015: Mohammed VI Academy

Senior career*
Years	Team	Apps	(Gls)
2015–2017	RS Berkane	10	(0)
2017–2023	Wydad AC	128	(0)
2017–2018	→ IR Tanger (loan)	25	(0)
2023–2024	Maghreb de Fès	2	(0)
2024–2025	MA Tétouan	0	(0)
2025–	AS FAR	2	(0)

International career
2017–2021	Morocco U-23	2	(0)
2017–	Morocco	3	(0)
Medal record
Men's football
Representing Morocco
African Nations Championship
Winner	2018
- * Club domestic league appearances and goals as of 27 December 2025

Ahmed Reda Tagnaouti (Arabic: أحمد رضا التكناوتي; born 5 April 1996) is a Moroccan professional footballer who plays as goalkeeper for Botola Pro club AS FAR and the Morocco national team.

== Club career ==
On 30 March 2023, while still with Wydad AC, Tagnaouti underwent a successful knee operation, having sustained an injury that saw him out of action for a prolonged period.

== International career ==
Tagnaouti was part of Morocco's 2018 African Nations Championship winning squad.

In May 2018, Tagnaouti was named in Morocco's 23-man squad for the 2018 FIFA World Cup in Russia. The following year Tagnaouti was selected for the 2019 Africa Cup of Nations. He also made the 2021 squad.

On 10 November 2022, he was named in Morocco's 26-man squad for the 2022 FIFA World Cup in Qatar. He and his teammates made history and became the first African nation in history to reach the semi-finals of the competition.

On 26 May 2026, Tagnaouti was selected in the 26-man squad for the 2026 FIFA World Cup.

== Career statistics ==
As of match played 12 June 2019

Appearances and goals by national team and year
National team	Year	Apps	Goals
Morocco	2017	1	0
Morocco	2018	1	0
Morocco	2019	1	0
Total		3	0

== Honours ==
IR Tanger

- Botola Pro: 2017–18

Wydad AC

- Botola Pro: 2016–17, 2018–19, 2020–21, 2021–22
- Moroccan Throne Cup runner-up: 2020–21
- CAF Champions League: 2021-22; runner-up: 2018-19, 2022-23

AS FAR

- CAF Champions League runner-up: 2025–26

Morocco A'

- African Nations Championship: 2018

Individual

- Botola Pro Best Goalkeeper: 2018–19
- CAF Champions League Best Goalkeeper: 2021–22

Orders

- Order of the Throne: 2022
