= 2022–23 Wydad AC season =

Wydad AC
2022–23 season
- President: Said Naciri
- Manager: Hussein Ammouta (from 18 August to 30 November); Mehdi Nafti (from 2 January to 26 February); Juan Carlos Garrido (from 26 February to 5 May); Sven Vandenbroeck (from 5 May)
- Stadium: Stade Mohammed V
- Botola: 2nd
- Throne Cup: Semi-finals
- Champions League: Runners-up
- CAF Super Cup: Runners-up
- FIFA Club World Cup: Second round
- Top goalscorer: League: Bouly Sambou (13); All: Bouly Sambou (20)
- Biggest win: 6–0 vs Rivers United (H)
- Biggest defeat: 0–3 vs AS FAR (A)
Home colours	Away colours	Third colours

The 2022–23 season was Wydad Athletic Club's 83rd season in existence and the club's 67th consecutive season in the top flight of Moroccan football. Wydad participated in the season's edition of the Botola, the Throne Cup and the Champions League. As the reigning African champions, they contested the CAF Super Cup against RS Berkane, and qualified for the annual FIFA Club World Cup.

The season covered the period from 2 September 2022 to 9 July 2023.

== Season events ==
On 26 February, Juan Carlos Garrido returned to Wydad AC as their new head coach. On 5 May, Garrido left his role as head coach, with Sven Vandenbroeck announced as his replacement.

== Players ==
As of 4 March 2023

Note: Flags indicate national team as defined under FIFA eligibility rules; some limited exceptions apply. Players may hold more than one non-FIFA nationality.

No.	Pos.	Nation	Player
1	GK	MAR	Yanis Henin
2	MF	MAR	Ismail Moutaraji
3	DF	ALG	Houcine Benayada
4	DF	MAR	Amine Aboulfath
5	MF	MAR	Yahya Jabrane (captain)
6	MF	MAR	Jalal Daoudi
7	MF	MAR	Zouhair El Moutaraji
8	MF	MAR	Reda Jaadi
9	FW	CMR	Didier Lamkel Zé (on loan from KV Kortrijk)
10	MF	MAR	Ayman El Hassouni (Vice-captain)
11	FW	MAR	Mohamed Ounajem
12	GK	MAR	Taha Mourid
13	MF	MAR	Abdellah Haimoud
14	DF	MAR	Yahia Attiyat Allah
15	DF	MAR	Yahya Nadrani

No.	Pos.	Nation	Player
17	MF	MAR	Badie Aouk
19	FW	MAR	Imad Khannouss
20	FW	SEN	Bouly Sambou
21	MF	MAR	Houmam Baaouch
22	DF	MAR	Ayoub El Amloud
23	DF	MAR	Hicham Boussefiane
24	DF	MAR	Sami El Anabi
25	DF	MAR	Amine Farhane
26	GK	MAR	Ahmed Tagnaouti
28	FW	LBA	Muaid Ellafi
30	FW	MAR	Saifeddine Bouhra
31	DF	MAR	Hamza Ait Allal
32	GK	MAR	Youssef El Motie
33	FW	MAR	Hamid Ahadad
35	DF	COD	Arsène Zola

=== Out on loan ===
Note: Flags indicate national team as defined under FIFA eligibility rules; some limited exceptions apply. Players may hold more than one non-FIFA nationality.

No.	Pos.	Nation	Player
3	MF	MAR	Anas Serrhat (at MC Oujda)
34	FW	MAR	Salaheddine Benyachou (at Olympic Safi)

== Transfers ==
=== In ===
Date	Position	Nationality	Name	From	Fee	Ref.
15 July 2022	MF	(Morocco)	Ismail Moutaraji	SCC Mohammédia	Undisclosed	
22 July 2022	DF	(Morocco)	Mehdi Ashabi	Fath Casablanca	Undisclosed	
22 July 2022	GK	(Morocco)	Yassine Finti	Fath Casablanca	Undisclosed	
1 August 2022	MF	(Morocco)	Ilyass Ezzahir	Fath Casablanca	Undisclosed	
7 August 2022	DF	(Morocco)	Souhail Amri	Widad Témara	Undisclosed	
9 August 2022	FW	(Morocco)	Mohamed Ounajem	–	Free transfer	
10 August 2022	FW	(Morocco)	Hamid Ahadad	–	Free transfer	
11 August 2022	FW	(Morocco)	Imad Khannouss	–	Free transfer	
21 August 2022	DF	(Democratic Republic of the Congo)	Arsène Zola	SCC Mohammédia	Undisclosed	
22 August 2022	MF	(Morocco)	Houmam Baouch	SCC Mohammédia	Undisclosed	
22 August 2022	GK	(Morocco)	Youssef El Motie	SCC Mohammédia	Undisclosed	
3 September 2022	FW	(Algeria)	Houcine Benayada	–	Free transfer	

=== Loans in ===
Date from	Position	Nationality	Name	From	Date to	Ref.
10 January 2023	FW	(Cameroon)	Didier Lamkel Zé	KV Kortrijk	30 June 2023	

=== Out ===
Date	Position	Nationality	Name	To	Fee	Ref.
8 September 2022	DF	(Ivory Coast)	Cheick Comara	Al-Arabi	Undisclosed	

=== Loans out ===
Date from	Position	Nationality	Name	To	Date to	Ref.
5 August 2022	GK	(Morocco)	Aissa Sioudi	Ittihad Tanger		
31 January 2023	FW	(Morocco)	Salaheddine Benyachou	Olympic Safi		

=== Released ===
Date	Position	Nationality	Name	Joined	Date	Ref
7 September 2022	FW	(Republic of the Congo)	Juvhel Tsoumou	Hanoi Police	9 January 2023	
16 January 2023	FW	(Senegal)	Karité Dembélé			

== Competitions ==
=== Overview ===
Competition	First match	Last match	Starting round	Final position	Record							
Competition	First match	Last match	Starting round	Final position	Pld	W	D	L	GF	GA	GD	Win %
Botola	2 September 2022	23 June 2023	Matchday 1	2nd	30	19	9	2	47	21	+26	63.33
Throne Cup	10 February 2023	9 July 2023	Round of 32	Semi-finals	4	1	2	1	3	3	+0	25.00
CAF Champions League	17 February 2023	11 June 2023	Second round	Runners-up	14	6	4	4	19	9	+10	42.86
CAF Super Cup	10 September 2022		Final	Runners-up	1	0	0	1	0	2	−2	0.00
FIFA Club World Cup	4 February 2023		Second round	Second round	1	0	1	0	1	1	+0	0.00
Total					50	26	16	8	70	36	+34	52.00

Source: Competitions

=== Botola ===
==== League table ====
Pos	Team	Pld	W	D	L	GF	GA	GD	Pts	Qualification or relegation
1	AS FAR (C)	30	20	7	3	50	19	+31	67	Qualification for Champions League
2	Wydad AC	30	19	9	2	47	21	+26	66	Qualification for Champions League
3	Fath Union Sport	30	15	10	5	36	16	+20	55	Qualification for Confederation Cup
4	Olympic Club de Safi	30	12	11	7	34	28	+6	47	
5	Raja CA	30	11	11	8	31	26	+5	44 (Note: Head-to-head: Raja CA: 6 points, RS Berkane: 0 point.)	

Updated to match(es) played on 23 June 2023. Source: FRMF.ma
Rules for classification: 1) Points; 2a) Head-to-head goal difference if they are two teams with equal points; 2b) Goal difference if they are more than two teams with equal points; 3) Number of wins; 4) Goals scored; 5) Play-off between involved teams.
(C) Champions

==== Results summary ====
Overall								Home						Away					
Pld	W	D	L	GF	GA	GD	Pts	W	D	L	GF	GA	GD	W	D	L	GF	GA	GD
30	19	9	2	47	21	+26	66	11	3	1	26	9	+17	8	6	1	21	12	+9

Source: Competitive matches

==== Results by round ====
Round	1	2	3	4	5	6	7	8	9	10	11	12	13	14	15	16	17	18	19	20	21	22	23	24	25	26	27	28	29	30
Ground	A	H	A	H	A	H	A	H	A	H	A	H	A	A	H	H	A	H	A	H	A	H	A	H	A	H	A	H	H	A
Result	D	W	W	W	D	W	W	D	L	L	W	W	D	W	W	D	W	W	D	W	D	W	W	D	W	W	D	W	W	W
Position	8	2	1	1	1	1	1	2	2	3	3	3	3	2	2	2	2	2	2	2	2	2	2	2	2	2	2	2	2	2

Source: Competitive matches
A = Away; H = Home; W = Win; D = Draw; L = Loss

==== Matches ====
2 September 2022 1	Fath Union Sport	1–1	Wydad AC	Rabat
17:00 UTC+1	Louadni (yellow card) 40', (goal) 45', (red card) 85'	Report	Ahadad (yellow card) 9'; Comara (yellow card) 36'; El Hassouni 51'; Jabrane (yellow card) 68'	Stadium: Stade Moulay Hassan; Referee: Hamza El Fariq

5 September 2022 2	Wydad AC	3–1	Difaâ Hassani El Jadidi	Casablanca
18:00 UTC+1	Attiyat Allah 9'; Sambou 13'; Daoudi (yellow card) 34'; El Hassouni 48'; Tagnaouti (yellow card) 52'	Report	Amale (yellow card) 24'; Juma 56'	Stadium: Stade Mohammed V Referee: Jamal Belbasri

18 September 2022 3	Olympique de Khouribga	1–2	Wydad AC	Khouribga
19:15 UTC+1	Hajjar (yellow card) 38'; Amimi 90+4'	Report	Jaadi 47'; Jabrane (yellow card) 58', (goal) 90+1'	Stadium: Complexe OCP; Referee: Redouane Jiyed

2 October 2022 4	Wydad AC	2–0	RS Berkane	Casablanca
20:30 UTC+1	Daoudi (yellow card) 10', (goal) 56'; Sambou 12'; Aouk (yellow card) 87'	Report	Fekkak (yellow card) 89'; Camara (yellow card) 90+3'	Stadium: Stade Mohammed V Referee: Samir Guezzaz

19 October 2022 5	Ittihad Tanger	0–0	Wydad AC	Tangier
18:15 UTC+1	El Kayssoumi (yellow card) 68'	Report	Aouk (red card) 51'; Jabrane (yellow card) 59'	Stadium: Stade Ibn Batouta; Referee: Hamza El Fariq

23 October 2022 6	Wydad AC	2–1	Raja CA	Casablanca
16:00 UTC+1	Jabrane (penalty missed) 10'; Benayada (yellow card) 20'; El Hassouni 56', (yellow card) 73'; Ounajem (yellow card) 64'; Attiyat Allah (yellow card) 76'; Zola 80'; Jaadi (yellow card) 90+6'; Ahadad (yellow card) 90+9'	Report	Bentayg (yellow card) 64'; Hadhoudi (yellow card) 78'; Nahiri 90'; Zrida (yellow card) 90+9'	Stadium: Stade Mohammed V Referee: Samir Guezzaz

29 October 2022 7	MC Oujda	0–1	Wydad AC	Oujda
18:15 UTC+1	Mehdi Attouchi (yellow card) 38'; Serbout (yellow card) 52'; Souane (yellow card) 81'	Report	Sambou 25'; Jaadi (yellow card) 42'; Zola (yellow card) 59'; Ahadad (yellow card) 83'	Stadium: Honneur Stadium; Referee: Nabil Benrkiya

6 November 2022 8	Wydad AC	0–0	Union de Touarga	Casablanca
18:00 UTC+1	Farhane (yellow card) 44'; Attiyat Allah (yellow card) 89'; Sambou (penalty missed) 90+7'	Report	Berqi (yellow card) 36'; Nemssaoui (yellow card) 43'; Nakach (yellow card) 66'; Diedhiou (yellow card) 82'; Dahdouh (yellow card) 89'	Stadium: Stade Mohammed V Referee: Redouane Jiyed

29 December 2022 9	AS FAR	3–0	Wydad AC	Rabat
16:00 UTC+1	Slim 3'; Diney (yellow card) 5'; Hammoudan 32'; Derrag (yellow card) 77'; Gnadou 78'; Hrimat (yellow card) 90+2'	Report	Jabrane (yellow card) 7'; Zola (yellow card) 43'; Haimoud (yellow card) 69'; Attiyat Allah (yellow card) 83'; Tagnaouti (red card) 90+5'	Stadium: Prince Moulay Abdellah Stadium; Referee: Redouane Jiyed

5 January 2023 10	Wydad AC	1–2	SCC Mohammédia	Casablanca
20:30 UTC+1	Daoudi (red card) 38'; Farhane (yellow card) 45+6'; Moutaraji (yellow card) 87'; El Hassouni 90+10' (pen.)	Report	Zila 46', (yellow card) 47'; Elowasti 83'; Drouich (yellow card) 90'	Stadium: Stade Mohammed V Referee: Samir Guezzaz

8 January 2023 11	Moghreb Tétouan	0–3	Wydad AC	Tétouan
16:00 UTC+1	Lamrabat (yellow card) 48'	Report	Jaadi (yellow card) 39'; Abdelouahab 47' (o.g.); El Hassouni (yellow card) 55'; El Moutaraji 74', (yellow card) 75'; Zola 85'; Baaouch (yellow card) 90+4'	Stadium: Stade Saniat Rmel; Referee: Mohamed Nhayeh

13 January 2023 12	Wydad AC	1–0	Hassania Agadir	Casablanca
18:15 UTC+1	Khannouss 7'; Farhane (yellow card) 22'	Report		Stadium: Stade Mohammed V Referee: Hamza El Fareq

19 January 2023 13	OC Safi	0–0	Wydad AC	Safi
16:00 UTC+1	Rhailouf (yellow card) 23'; Lamirat (yellow card) 86'	Report	Daoudi (yellow card) 22'; Attiyat Allah (yellow card) 60'; Jaadi (yellow card) 90+2'; Ounajem (yellow card) 90+14'	Stadium: Stade El Massira; Referee: Yassine Bouslim

22 January 2023 14	JS Soualem	0–1	Wydad AC	Mohammedia
20:30 UTC+1	Erbibi (yellow card) 66' (yellow-red card) 90'; Maghloub (yellow card) 90+3'	Report	El Hassouni (yellow card) 34', (goal) 52'; Daoudi (yellow card) 79'; Haimoud (yellow card) 81'	Stadium: Stade El Bachir; Referee: Hicham Tamsamani

25 January 2023 15	Wydad AC	1–0	Maghreb de Fès	Casablanca
20:30 UTC+1	Boussefiane (yellow card) 1'; Moutaraji (yellow card) 45+5'; El Hassouni 53'; Tagnaouti (yellow card) 90+8'	Report	El Badoui (yellow card) 6'; Mhamdi (yellow card) 90'	Stadium: Stade Mohammed V Referee: Redouane Jiyed

29 January 2023 16	Wydad AC	0–0	Fath Union Sport	Casablanca
18:15 UTC+1	Ahadad (yellow card) 12'; Aboulfath (yellow card) 58'; Attiyat Allah (yellow card) 72'; Jabrane (yellow card) 90+3'	Report	Guy (yellow card) 52'	Stadium: Stade Mohammed V Referee: Yassine Bouslim

21 February 2023 17	Difaâ Hassani El Jadidi	0–1	Wydad AC	El Jadida
18:15 UTC+1	Chichane (yellow card) 90+5'	Report	Sambou 28'; Boussefiane (yellow card) 58'; Aboulfath (yellow card) 86'; Lamkel Zé (yellow card) 90+6'	Stadium: Stade El Abdi; Referee: Hicham Tamsamani

28 February 2023 18	Wydad AC	3–2	OC Khouribga	Casablanca
20:30 UTC+1	Sambou 15', 37'; Bouhra 65'; El Amloud (yellow card) 90+6'	Report	Amimi 8'; Bencherifa (yellow card) 9'; El Hachemi 76'; Essafi (yellow card) 81'; Rahim (yellow card) 90+6'; Chaina (red card) 90+7'	Stadium: Stade Mohammed V Referee: Redouane Jiyed

7 March 2023 19	RS Berkane	3–3	Wydad AC	Berkane
18:15 UTC+1	El Fahli (yellow card) 30'; Dayo (yellow card) 33', (goal) 90+2', 90+11' (pen.); El Bahraoui 34'; El Moussaoui (yellow card) 90+5'	Report	Sambou 10'; Bouhra (yellow card) 68'; El Hassouni 70'; Ellafi (yellow card) 86'; Boussefiane (yellow card) 90+10'; Farhane 90+13'	Stadium: Stade Municipal de Berkane; Referee: Nabil Benrkiya

14 March 2023 20	Wydad AC	3–0	Ittihad Tanger	Casablanca
18:15 UTC+1	Sambou 5', 26'; Ounajem 33'; El Amloud (yellow card) 38'	Report	Moutouali (penalty missed) 21'; Belmaachi (yellow card) 77'	Stadium: Stade Mohammed V Referee: Yassine Bouslim

5 April 2023 21	Raja CA	2–2	Wydad AC	Casablanca
22:00 UTC+0	Khabba (yellow card) 22'; Aholou (yellow card) 24'; Bouzok 39' (pen.); Habti (yellow card) 45+3'; Boulacsoute 67', (yellow card) 68' (red card) 90+15'; Al Makahasi (yellow card) 90+6'; Mokadem (yellow card) 90+7'; Hadhoudi (yellow card) 90+9'	Report	Jabrane (yellow card) 23'; Farhane (yellow card) 37'; Zola 45+4'; Jaadi (yellow card) 71'; Attiyat Allah (yellow card) 73'; Ellafi (yellow card) 90+5'; El Hassouni 90+13' (pen.), (yellow card) 90+14'	Stadium: Stade Mohammed V Referee: Redouane Jiyed

8 April 2023 22	Wydad AC	1–0	MC Oujda	Casablanca
22:00 UTC+0	Haimoud 33'; Boussefiane (yellow card) 56'	Report	Sarghat (yellow card) 27'	Stadium: Stade Mohammed V Referee: Hamza El Fareq

15 April 2023 23	Union de Touarga	1–2	Wydad AC	Rabat
22:00 UTC+0	Aziz (yellow card) 8'; Khaloua (yellow card) 27'; Bentayeb 38'; Dairani (yellow card) 62'; Zouhzouh (yellow card) 90+8'	Report	Daoudi (yellow card) 55'; Sambou 67', 75'; Attiyat Allah (yellow card) 90'; El Motie (yellow card) 90+2'; Haimoud (yellow card) 90+7'; Bouhra (yellow card) 90+8'	Stadium: Stade Moulay Hassan; Referee: Mohamed Bellote

3 May 2023 24	Wydad AC	1–1	AS FAR	Casablanca
19:15 UTC+1}	Daoudi (yellow card) 35'; Diney 45+6' (o.g.); El Hassouni (yellow card) 76'; Zola (yellow card) 82'	Report	Slim (yellow card) 45+8'; Aboulfath 90+7' (o.g.); Naji (yellow card) 90+8'; Ennafati (yellow card) 90+12'	Stadium: Stade Mohammed V Referee: Yassine Bouslim

6 May 2023 25	SCC Mohammédia	1–3	Wydad AC	Mohammedia
21:30 UTC+1	Jaadi 60' (o.g.); Ennakouss (yellow card) 71'	Report	Sambou 19'; Bouhra 43'; Ennakouss 90+8' (o.g.)	Stadium: Stade El Bachir; Referee: Samir Guezzaz

29 May 2023 26	Wydad AC	2–0	Moghreb Tétouan	Casablanca
20:00 UTC+1	Farhane 57'; Bouhra (yellow card) 60'; Attiyat Allah 76'; Daoudi (yellow card) 81' (red card) 87'	Report	Arbidi (yellow card) 44'; Radouani (yellow card) 75'	Stadium: Stade Mohammed V Referee: Mohammed Lahouidri

14 June 2023 27	Hassania Agadir	0–0	Wydad AC	Agadir
20:00 UTC+1	Cheikhi (yellow card) 34'; Ben Choug (yellow card) 63'; Mbele (yellow card) 79'	Report	Sambou (yellow card) 38'; Aboulfath (yellow card) 73'	Stadium: Stade Adrar; Referee: Hamza El Fareq

17 June 2023 28	Wydad AC	3–1	Olympic Club de Safi	Casablanca
20:00 UTC+1	Amri 13' (o.g.); Daoudi 18', (yellow card) 21'; Baaouch (yellow card) 78'; Jabrane 90' (pen.); Jaadi (yellow card) 90+2'	Report	El Mourabit 4'; Najjari (yellow card) 70'; Diarra (yellow card) 89'; Amri (penalty missed) 90+6'	Stadium: Stade Mohammed V Referee: Hicham Tamsamani

20 June 2023 29	Wydad AC	3–1	Jeunesse Sportive Soualem	Casablanca
20:00 UTC+1	El Amloud 38'; Jabrane 63'; Nadrani (yellow card) 69'; Jaadi (yellow card) 71'; Sambou 87'	Report	Dahdouh (yellow card) 29'; Tamayazou 83'; Maghloub (yellow card) 90+2'	Stadium: Stade Mohammed V Referee: Yassine Bouslim

23 June 2022 30	Maghreb de Fès	0–2	Wydad AC	Fez
20:00 UTC+1	Bouamar (yellow card) 32'; Oukaili (yellow card) 45+1'; Riahi (yellow card) 80'	Report	Boussefiane 13'; Jabrane 53' (pen.), (yellow card) 61'	Stadium: Fez Stadium; Referee: Redouane Jiyed

=== CAF Super Cup ===
10 September 2022	Wydad AC (Morocco)	0–2	(Morocco) RS Berkane	Rabat, Morocco
20:00 UTC+1	Aboulfath (yellow card) 69'	Report	Lukombe (yellow card) 27'; El Bahri 32'; El Moussaoui (yellow card) 34'; El Moudane 71' (pen.); Regragui (yellow card) 85'	Stadium: Prince Moulay Abdellah Stadium; Referee: Mustapha Ghorbal (Algeria)

=== FIFA Club World Cup ===
4 February 2023 Second round	Wydad AC (Morocco)	1–1 (a.e.t.) (3–5 p)	(Saudi Arabia) Al-Hilal	Rabat, Morocco
15:30 UTC+1	Jaadi (yellow card) 10'; El Amloud 52'; Lamkel Zé (yellow card) 56'; Daoudi (yellow card) 57'; Jabrane (yellow card) 89' (yellow-red card) 90'; Ounajem (yellow card) 90'	Report	Al-Bulaihi (yellow card) 10'; Kanno (yellow card) 56' (yellow-red card) 93', (goal) 90+4' (pen.); Al-Dawsari (yellow card) 57'; Al-Shehri (yellow card) 116'; Al-Hamdan (yellow card) 126'	Stadium: Prince Moulay Abdellah Stadium; Attendance: 43,891; Referee: Iván Barton (El Salvador)
	Penalties
	Attiyat Allah (penalty missed); El Amloud (penalty scored); Ounajem (penalty scored); Daoudi (penalty scored)		(penalty scored) Marega; (penalty scored) Vietto; (penalty scored) Al-Shehri; (penalty scored) Al-Hamdan; (penalty scored) Al-Juwayr

=== Throne Cup ===
10 February 2023 Round of 32	Moghreb Tétouan	0–0 (a.e.t.) (5–6 p)	Wydad AC	Tétouan
17:00 UTC+1		Report		Stadium: Stade Saniat Rmel
	Penalties
	Penalty scored Penalty missed		Penalty scored Penalty missed

12 April 2023 Round of 16	Ittihad Tanger	1–1 (a.e.t.) (1–3 p)	Wydad AC	Tangier
22:00 UTC+0	El Moudane 5'	Report	El Hassouni 90+13' (pen.)	Stadium: Ibn Batouta Stadium; Referee: Daki Reddad
	Penalties
	Rabja (penalty scored); Chentouf (penalty missed); Souboul (penalty missed); El Ouassli (penalty missed)		(penalty scored) Jabrane; (penalty scored) El Amloud; (penalty scored) Aboulfath

24 May 2023 Quarter-finals	Difaâ Hassani El Jadidi	1–2	Wydad AC	El Jadida
20:00 UTC+1	Darai 59'; Amale (red card) 90+5'	Report	Farhane 37'; El Hassouni 74' (pen.)	Stadium: Stade El Abdi; Referee: Hicham Tamsamani

9 July 2023 Semi-finals	Wydad AC	0–1	Raja CA	Casablanca
17:00 UTC+1		Report	Zola 18' (o.g.)	Stadium: Stade Mohammed V

=== CAF Champions League ===
==== Qualifying rounds ====
===== Second round =====
9 October 2022 First leg	Rivers United (Nigeria)	2–1	(Morocco) Wydad AC	Port Harcourt, Nigeria
16:00 UTC+1	Ohawume 33'; Acquah 54'; Nwagua (yellow card) 64'	Report	Sambou 31'; El Hassouni (yellow card) 83'	Stadium: Adokiye Amiesimaka Stadium; Referee: Kalilou Traore (Ivory Coast)

16 October 2022 Second leg	Wydad AC (Morocco)	6–0 (7–2 agg.)	(Nigeria) Rivers United	Casablanca, Morocco
20:00 UTC+1	El Amloud 32'; Jabrane 44' (pen.), 69' (pen.); Sambou 49', 56'; Jaadi (yellow card) 87'; Ahadad 90'	Report	Seidu (yellow card) 28' (yellow-red card) 38'	Stadium: Stade Mohammed V Referee: Sadok Selmi (Tunisia)

==== Group stage ====
===== Group A =====
Pos	Team	Pld	W	D	L	GF	GA	GD	Pts	Qualification
1	(Morocco) Wydad AC	6	4	1	1	7	1	+6	13	Advance to knockout stage
2	(Algeria) JS Kabylie	6	3	1	2	4	5	−1	10	Advance to knockout stage
3	(Angola) Petro de Luanda	6	2	1	3	3	5	−2	7	
4	(Democratic Republic of the Congo) AS Vita Club	6	1	1	4	3	6	−3	4	

Source: CAF

17 February 2023 2	JS Kabylie (Algeria)	1–0	(Morocco) Wydad AC	Algiers, Algeria
20:00 UTC+1	Souyad 87' (yellow card) 88'	Report	Attiyat Allah (yellow card) 29'	Stadium: Stade du 5 Juillet; Referee: Sadok Selmi (Tunisia)
Note: JS Kabylie play their group stage home matches at Stade du 5 Juillet, Algiers, instead of their regular home stadium 1 November 1954 Stadium, Tizi Ouzou, which did not meet CAF requirements.

24 February 2023 3	Wydad AC (Morocco)	1–0	(Angola) Petro de Luanda	Casablanca, Morocco
20:00 UTC+1	Jabrane 34' (pen.); El Hassouni (yellow card) 57'; Haimoud (yellow card) 83'; Aboulfath (yellow card) 89'	Report	Pinto (yellow card) 45+3'	Stadium: Stade Mohammed V Referee: Ibrahim Kalilou Traore (Ivory Coast)

3 March 2023 1	Wydad AC (Morocco)	1–0	(Democratic Republic of the Congo) AS Vita Club	Casablanca, Morocco
20:00 UTC+1	Magema 55' (o.g.)	Report	Ntumba (yellow card) 17'; Motu (yellow card) 33'; Tchakei (yellow card) 65'	Stadium: Stade Mohammed V Referee: Mahmood Ismail (Sudan)
Note: Match was originally scheduled to be played on 10 or 11 February 2023, but was rescheduled to be played on 3 March 2023 due to Wydad AC's participation in the 2022 FIFA Club World Cup in Morocco between 1 and 11 February 2023.

11 March 2023 4	Petro de Luanda (Angola)	0–2	(Morocco) Wydad AC	Luanda, Angola
17:00 UTC+1	Soares (yellow card) 12'	Report	Daoudi (yellow card) 20'; Boussefiane (yellow card) 45+1'; Zola 59'; Farhane (yellow card) 67'; Tagnaouti (yellow card) 84'; Sambou 90' (yellow card) 90+1'	Stadium: Estádio 11 de Novembro; Referee: Pierre Atcho (Gabon)

18 March 2023 5	AS Vita Club (Democratic Republic of the Congo)	0–0	(Morocco) Wydad AC	Brazzaville Congo
14:00 UTC+1	Thémopolé (yellow card) 41'	Report	Sambou (yellow card) 45+2'	Stadium: Stade Alphonse Massemba-Débat; Referee: Boubou Traoré (Mali)

1 April 2023 6	Wydad AC (Morocco)	3–0	(Algeria) JS Kabylie	Casablanca, Morocco
22:00 UTC+0	Jabrane (yellow card) 21'; Sambou 38', 51' (yellow card) 66'; Attiyat Allah (yellow card) 82'; El Moutaraji 87'	Report	Zerdoum (yellow card) 45+2'; Gatal (yellow card) 53'; Matallah (yellow card) 86'	Stadium: Stade Mohammed V Referee: Abongile Tom (South Africa)

==== Knockout stage ====
===== Quarter-finals =====
22 April 2023 First leg	Simba (Tanzania)	1–0	(Morocco) Wydad AC	Dar es Salaam, Tanzania
16:00 UTC+3	Onyango (yellow card) 21'; Othos 30'	Report	Aboulfath (yellow card) 28'; Daoudi (yellow card) 52'; Ahadad (yellow card) 84'; Zola (yellow card) 85'	Stadium: National Stadium; Attendance: 45,000; Referee: Issa Sy (Senegal)

28 April 2023 Second leg	Wydad AC (Morocco)	1–0 (1–1 agg.) (4–3 p)	(Tanzania) Simba	Casablanca, Morocco
20:00 UTC+1	Sambou 24'; El Moutaraji (yellow card) 90+2'	Report	Chama (yellow card) 8'	Stadium: Mohammed V Stadium; Attendance: 39,000; Referee: Alhadi Allaou Mahamat (Chad)
	Penalties
	Jabrane (penalty scored); El Amloud (penalty scored); Aboulfath (penalty scored); Haimoud (penalty scored)		(penalty scored) Nyoni; (penalty scored) Ntibazonkiza; (penalty missed) Kapombe; (penalty scored) Phiri; (penalty missed) Chama

===== Semi-finals =====
13 May 2023 First leg	Wydad AC (Morocco)	0–0	(South Africa) Mamelodi Sundowns	Casablanca, Morocco
20:00 UTC+1	Jabrane (yellow card) 32'; Attiyat Allah (yellow card) 45+2'; Ahadad (yellow card) 85'	Report	Modiba (yellow card) 28'; Maema (red card) 43'; Boutouil (yellow card) 59'; Allende (red card) 90+5'	Stadium: Mohammed V Stadium; Attendance: 39,000; Referee: Daniel Nii Laryea (Ghana)

20 May 2023 Second leg	Mamelodi Sundowns (South Africa)	2–2 (2–2 (a) agg.)	(Morocco) Wydad AC	Pretoria, South Africa
15:00 UTC+2	Zwane 50'; Boutouil (yellow card) 58'; Shalulile 79'; Mbule (yellow card) 90+7'	Report	Sambou (yellow card) 16'; Aboulfath (yellow card) 40'; Jabrane (yellow card) 56'; El Amloud 72' (yellow card) 90+4'; Mvala 83' (o.g.); Ahadad (yellow card) 90+8'	Stadium: Loftus Versfeld Stadium; Attendance: 50,000; Referee: Mahmood Ismail (Sudan)

===== Final =====
4 June 2023 First leg	Al Ahly (Egypt)	2–1	(Morocco) Wydad AC	Cairo, Egypt
21:00 UTC+3	Tau 45+4'; Kahraba 59'	Report	Bouhra 86'	Stadium: Cairo International Stadium; Attendance: 50,000; Referee: Ibrahim Mutaz (Libya)

11 June 2023 Second leg	Wydad AC (Morocco)	1–1 (2–3 agg.)	(Egypt) Al Ahly	Casablanca, Morocco
20:00 UTC+1	Attiyat Allah 27'	Report	Abdelmonem 78'	Stadium: Stade Mohammed V Attendance: 45,000; Referee: Bamlak Tessema Weyesa (Ethiopia)

== Squad statistics ==
=== Appearances and goals ===
No.	Pos	Nat	Player	Total		Botola		Throne Cup		CAF Champions League		CAF Super Cup		FIFA Club World Cup	
No.	Pos	Nat	Player	Apps	Goals	Apps	Goals	Apps	Goals	Apps	Goals	Apps	Goals	Apps	Goals
Goalkeepers
1	GK	(Morocco) MAR	Yanis Henin	0	0	0	0	0	0	0	0	0	0	0	0
26	GK	(Morocco) MAR	Ahmed Reda Tagnaouti	28	0	18	0	1	0	7	0	1	0	1	0
32	GK	(Morocco) MAR	Youssef El Motie	22	0	12	0	3	0	7	0	0	0	0	0
Defenders
3	DF	(Algeria) ALG	Houcine Benayada	19	0	9+3	0	1	0	4+1	0	0+1	0	0	0
4	DF	(Morocco) MAR	Amine Aboulfath	28	0	15	0	3+1	0	6+2	0	1	0	0	0
14	DF	(Morocco) MAR	Yahia Attiyat Allah	46	3	26+1	2	3	0	14	1	1	0	1	0
22	DF	(Morocco) MAR	Ayoub El Amloud	48	4	28+1	1	4	0	12+1	2	1	0	1	1
24	DF	(Morocco) MAR	Sami El Anabi	1	0	0+1	0	0	0	0	0	0	0	0	0
25	DF	(Morocco) MAR	Amine Farhane	30	3	16+1	2	3	1	7+2	0	0	0	1	0
31	DF	(Morocco) MAR	Hamza Ait Allal	8	0	1+5	0	0	0	0+2	0	0	0	0	0
35	DF	(Democratic Republic of the Congo) COD	Arsène Zola	41	4	21+2	3	2	0	13+1	1	1	0	1	0
Midfielders
2	MF	(Morocco) MAR	Ismail Moutaraji	15	0	6+4	0	1	0	0+3	0	0+1	0	0	0
5	MF	(Morocco) MAR	Yahya Jabrane	45	7	25+1	4	3	0	14	3	1	0	1	0
6	MF	(Morocco) MAR	Jalal Daoudi	36	2	12+5	2	4	0	11+2	0	1	0	1	0
8	MF	(Morocco) MAR	Reda Jaadi	35	1	20+5	1	1	0	5+3	0	0	0	1	0
10	MF	(Morocco) MAR	Ayman El Hassouni	43	10	21+3	8	3+1	2	11+2	0	1	0	1	0
13	MF	(Morocco) MAR	Abdellah Haimoud	27	1	8+9	1	0	0	3+7	0	0	0	0	0
21	MF	(Morocco) MAR	Houmam Baaouch	8	0	0+7	0	0	0	0+1	0	0	0	0	0
Forwards
7	FW	(Morocco) MAR	Zouhair El Moutaraji	21	2	8+5	1	0	0	2+5	1	0+1	0	0	0
11	FW	(Morocco) MAR	Mohamed Ounajem	40	1	21+4	1	1	0	6+6	0	0+1	0	0+1	0
17	FW	(Morocco) MAR	Badie Aouk	19	0	3+12	0	0+1	0	2	0	1	0	0	0
19	FW	(Morocco) MAR	Imad Khannouss	5	1	2+2	1	0	0	0+1	0	0	0	0	0
20	FW	(Senegal) SEN	Bouly Sambou	42	20	22+3	13	1+1	0	12+1	7	1	0	0+1	0
23	FW	(Morocco) MAR	Hicham Boussefiane	30	1	8+10	1	2	0	6+3	0	0	0	0+1	0
28	FW	(Libya) LBA	Muaid Ellafi	17	0	3+6	0	2	0	0+6	0	0	0	0	0
30	FW	(Morocco) MAR	Saifeddine Bouhra	45	3	17+11	2	3+1	0	10+2	1	0	0	1	0
33	FW	(Morocco) MAR	Hamid Ahadad	24	1	3+12	0	2	0	1+5	1	1	0	0	0
Players transferred/loaned out during the season
9	FW	(Cameroon) CMR	Didier Lamkel Zé	7	0	0+3	0	1	0	1+1	0	0	0	1	0
19	FW	(Republic of the Congo) CGO	Juvhel Tsoumou	1	0	0+1	0	0	0	0	0	0	0	0	0
29	DF	(Ivory Coast) CIV	Cheick Comara	1	0	1	0	0	0	0	0	0	0	0	0
29	FW	(Senegal) SEN	Karité Dembélé	1	0	0+1	0	0	0	0	0	0	0	0	0
34	FW	(Morocco) MAR	Salaheddine Benyachou	4	0	2+2	0	0	0	0	0	0	0	0	0

Source: Competitions

=== Goalscorers ===
Rank	No.	Pos.	Nat.	Name	Botola	Throne Cup	CAF Champions League	CAF Super Cup	FIFA Club World Cup	Total
1	20	FW	(Senegal)	Bouly Sambou	13	0	7	0	0	20
2	10	MF	(Morocco)	Ayman El Hassouni	8	2	0	0	0	10
3	5	MF	(Morocco)	Yahya Jabrane	4	0	2	0	0	6
4	35	DF	(Democratic Republic of the Congo)	Arsène Zola	3	0	1	0	0	4
4	22	DF	(Morocco)	Ayoub El Amloud	1	0	2	0	1	4
6	25	DF	(Morocco)	Amine Farhane	2	1	0	0	0	3
6	30	FW	(Morocco)	Saifeddine Bouhra	2	0	1	0	0	3
6	14	DF	(Morocco)	Yahia Attiyat Allah	2	0	1	0	0	3
9	7	MF	(Morocco)	Zouhair El Moutaraji	1	0	1	0	0	2
9	6	MF	(Morocco)	Jalal Daoudi	2	0	0	0	0	2
11	8	MF	(Morocco)	Reda Jaadi	1	0	0	0	0	1
11	19	FW	(Morocco)	Imad Khannouss	1	0	0	0	0	1
11	11	FW	(Morocco)	Mohamed Ounajem	1	0	0	0	0	1
11	13	MF	(Morocco)	Abdellah Haimoud	1	0	0	0	0	1
11	33	FW	(Morocco)	Hamid Ahadad	0	0	1	0	0	1
11	23	FW	(Morocco)	Hicham Boussefiane	1	0	0	0	0	1
Own goals					4	0	2	0	0	6
Totals					47	3	19	0	1	70

=== Clean sheets ===
Rank	No.	Pos.	Nat.	Player	Botola	Throne Cup	CAF Champions League	CAF Super Cup	FIFA Club World Cup	Total
1	26	GK	(Morocco)	Ahmed Tagnaouti	11	1	5	0	0	17
2	32	GK	(Morocco)	Youssef El Motie	5	0	3	0	0	8
Totals					16	1	8	0	0	25

=== Disciplinary record ===
As of match played on 23 June 2023

No.	Pos.	Nat.	Player	Botola		Throne Cup		CAF Champions League		CAF Super Cup		FIFA Club World Cup		Total	
No.	Pos.	Nat.	Player	Yellow card	Red card	Yellow card	Red card	Yellow card	Red card	Yellow card	Red card	Yellow card	Red card	Yellow card	Red card
2	MF	(Morocco)	Ismail Moutaraji	2	0	0	0	0	0	0	0	0	0	2	0
3	DF	(Algeria)	Houcine Benayada	1	0	0	0	0	0	0	0	0	0	1	0
4	DF	(Morocco)	Amine Aboulfath	3	0	0	0	3	0	1	0	0	0	7	0
5	MF	(Morocco)	Yahya Jabrane	8	0	0	0	3	0	0	0	2	1	13	1
6	MF	(Morocco)	Jalal Daoudi	7	2	0	0	2	0	0	0	1	0	10	2
7	MF	(Morocco)	Zouhair El Moutaraji	1	0	0	0	1	0	0	0	0	0	2	0
8	MF	(Morocco)	Reda Jaadi	7	0	0	0	1	0	0	0	1	0	8	0
9	FW	(Cameroon)	Didier Lamkel Zé	1	0	0	0	0	0	0	0	1	0	2	0
10	MF	(Morocco)	Ayman El Hassouni	5	0	0	0	2	0	0	0	0	0	7	0
11	FW	(Morocco)	Mohamed Ounajem	2	0	0	0	0	0	0	0	1	0	3	0
13	MF	(Morocco)	Abdellah Haimoud	3	0	0	0	1	0	0	0	0	0	4	0
14	DF	(Morocco)	Yahia Attiyat Allah	7	0	0	0	4	0	0	0	0	0	11	0
17	FW	(Morocco)	Badie Aouk	1	1	0	0	0	0	0	0	0	0	1	1
20	FW	(Senegal)	Bouly Sambou	1	0	0	0	4	0	0	0	0	0	5	0
21	MF	(Morocco)	Houmam Baaouch	2	0	0	0	0	0	0	0	0	0	2	0
22	DF	(Morocco)	Ayoub El Amloud	2	0	0	0	2	0	0	0	0	0	4	0
23	DF	(Morocco)	Hicham Boussefiane	4	0	0	0	1	0	0	0	0	0	5	0
25	DF	(Morocco)	Amine Farhane	4	0	0	0	1	0	0	0	0	0	5	0
26	GK	(Morocco)	Ahmed Tagnaouti	2	1	0	0	1	0	0	0	0	0	3	1
28	FW	(Libya)	Muaid Ellafi	2	0	0	0	0	0	0	0	0	0	2	0
30	FW	(Morocco)	Saifeddine Bouhra	3	0	0	0	1	0	0	0	0	0	4	0
32	GK	(Morocco)	Youssef El Motie	1	0	0	0	0	0	0	0	0	0	1	0
33	FW	(Morocco)	Hamid Ahadad	4	0	0	0	3	0	0	0	0	0	7	0
35	DF	(Democratic Republic of the Congo)	Arsène Zola	3	0	0	0	1	0	0	0	0	0	4	0
Players transferred out during the season
29	DF	(Ivory Coast)	Cheick Comara	1	0	0	0	0	0	0	0	0	0	1	0
Totals				77	4	0	0	31	0	1	0	6	1	115	5
