= 2023 CAF Champions League final =

African football tournament final

- Match programme cover
- Event: 2022–23 CAF Champions League
Al Ahly	Wydad AC
(Egypt)	(Morocco)
3	2

First leg
Al Ahly	Wydad AC
2	1
- Date: 4 June 2023
- Venue: Cairo International Stadium, Cairo
- Referee: Mutaz Ibrahim (Libya)
- Attendance: 50,000
- Weather: Clear weather with a few clouds 27 °C (81 °F); 41% humidity

Second leg
Wydad AC	Al Ahly
1	1
- Date: 11 June 2023
- Venue: Stade Mohammed V, Casablanca
- Referee: Bamlak Tessema Weyesa (Ethiopia)
- Attendance: 80,000
- Weather: Clear weather with a few clouds 22 °C (72 °F); 73% humidity

The 2023 CAF Champions League final were the final matches of the 2022–23 CAF Champions League, the 59th edition of Africa's premier club football tournament organized by the Confederation of African Football (CAF), and the 27th edition under the current CAF Champions League title.

The final was contested between Egyptian club Al Ahly and Moroccan club Wydad AC, which is a repeat of the 2022 CAF Champions League final, the second time in CAF Champions League history that two same clubs compete in the final of Champions League consecutively.

== Teams ==
In the following table, finals until 1996 were in the African Cup of Champions Club era, since 1997 were in the CAF Champions League era.

Team	Zone	Previous finals appearances (bold indicates winners)
(Egypt) Al Ahly	UNAF (North Africa)	15 (**1982**, 1983, **1987**, **2001**, **2005**, **2006**, 2007, **2008**, **2012**, **2013**, 2017, 2018, **2020**, **2021**, 2022)
(Morocco) Wydad AC	UNAF (North Africa)	5 (**1992**, 2011, **2017**, 2019, **2022**)

== Venues ==
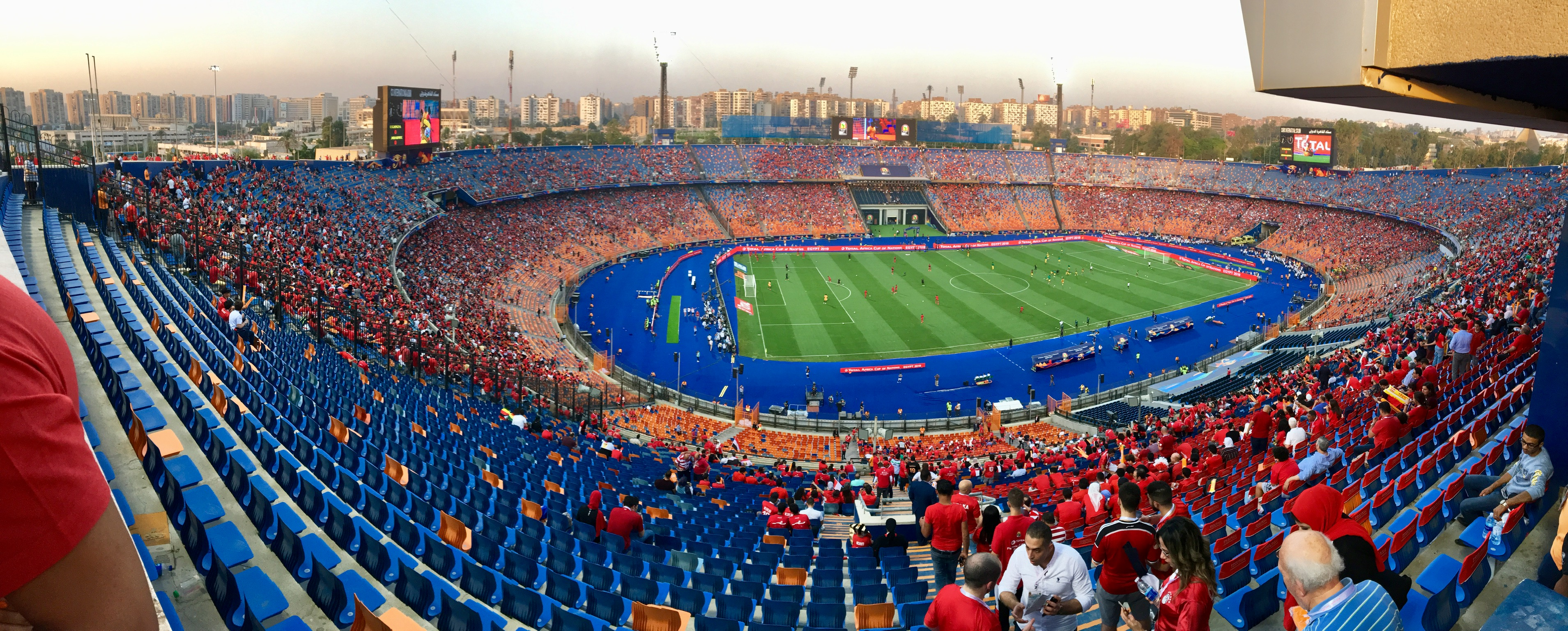
Cairo International Stadium in Cairo, Egypt, hosted the first leg.

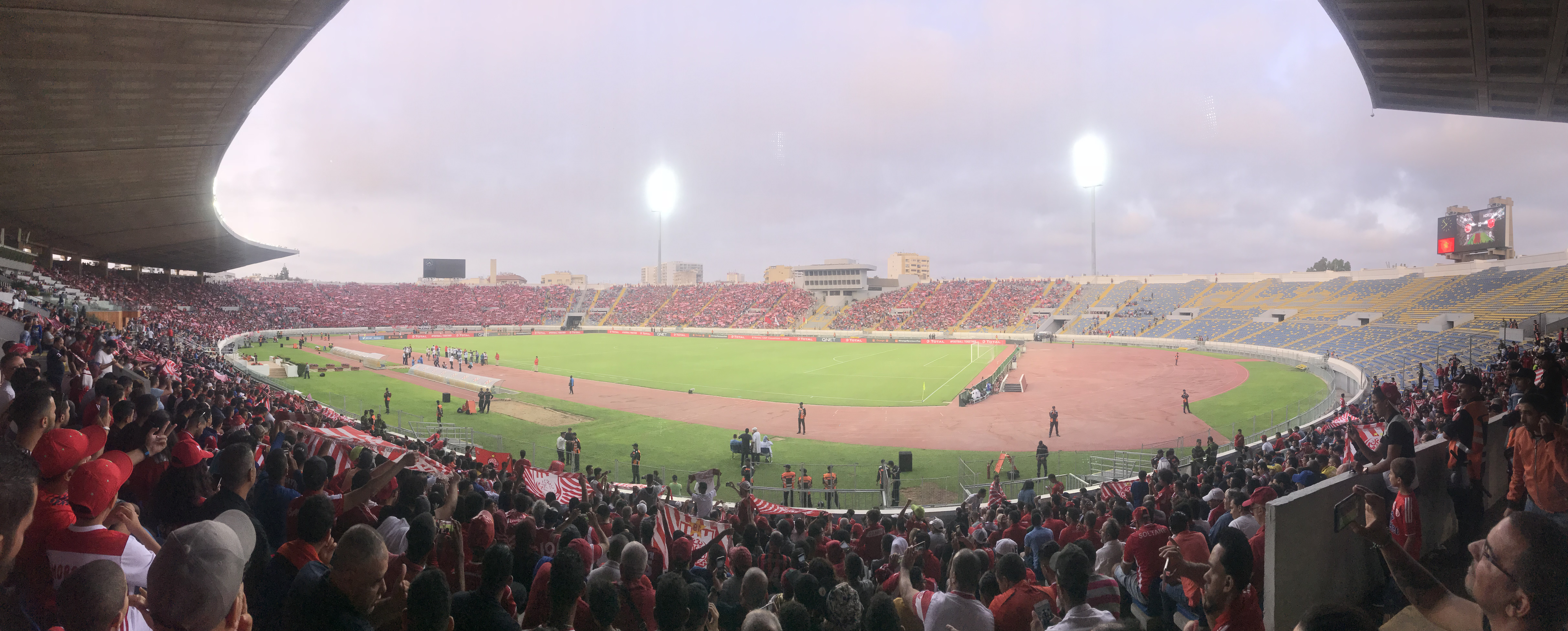
Stade Mohammed V in Casablanca, Morocco, hosted the second leg.

== Road to the final ==
Note: In all results below, the score of the finalist is given first (H: home; A: away).

(Egypt) Al Ahly				Round	(Morocco) Wydad AC			
Opponent	Agg.	1st leg	2nd leg	Qualifying rounds	Opponent	Agg.	1st leg	2nd leg
Bye				First round	Bye			
(Tunisia) Union Monastirienne	4–0	1–0 (A)	3–0 (H)	Second round	(Nigeria) Rivers United	7–2	1–2 (A)	6–0 (H)
Opponent	Result			Group stage	Opponent	Result		
(Cameroon) Coton Sport	3–0 (H)			Matchday 1	(Democratic Republic of the Congo) AS Vita Club	1–0 (H)		
(Sudan) Al Hilal	0–1 (A)			Matchday 2	(Algeria) JS Kabylie	0–1 (A)		
(South Africa) Mamelodi Sundowns	2–2 (H)			Matchday 3	(Angola) Petro de Luanda	1–0 (H)		
(South Africa) Mamelodi Sundowns	2–5 (A)			Matchday 4	(Angola) Petro de Luanda	2–0 (A)		
(Cameroon) Coton Sport	4–0 (A)			Matchday 5	(Democratic Republic of the Congo) AS Vita Club	0–0 (A)		
(Sudan) Al Hilal	3–0 (H)			Matchday 6	(Algeria) JS Kabylie	3–0 (H)		
**Group B runners-up**: Pos / Team / Pld / Pts; 1 / (South Africa) Mamelodi Sundowns / 6 / **14**; **2** / (Egypt) Al Ahly / **6** / **10**; 3 / (Sudan) Al Hilal / 6 / **10**; 4 / (Cameroon) Coton Sport / 6 / **0**; Source: CAF				Final standings	**Group A winners**: Pos / Team / Pld / Pts; **1** / (Morocco) Wydad AC / **6** / **13**; 2 / (Algeria) JS Kabylie / 6 / **10**; 3 / (Angola) Petro de Luanda / 6 / **7**; 4 / (Democratic Republic of the Congo) AS Vita Club / 6 / **4**; Source: CAF			
Opponent	Agg.	1st leg	2nd leg	Knockout stage	Opponent	Agg.	1st leg	2nd leg
(Morocco) Raja CA	2–0	2–0 (H)	0–0 (A)	Quarter-finals	(Tanzania) Simba	1–1 (4–3 p)	0–1 (A)	1–0 (H)
(Tunisia) Espérance de Tunis	4–0	3–0 (A)	1–0 (H)	Semi-finals	(South Africa) Mamelodi Sundowns	2–2 (a)	0–0 (H)	2–2 (A)

== Format ==
The final was played on a home-and-away two-legged basis.

If the aggregate score was tied after the second leg, the away goals rule was applied, and if still tied, extra time was played, and a penalty shoot-out was used to determine the winner.

== Matches ==
=== First leg ===
==== Details ====
4 June 2023
21:00 UTC+3

Al Ahly (Egypt)	2–1	(Morocco) Wydad AC
Tau 45+4'; Kahraba 59'	Report	Bouhra 86'

Cairo International Stadium, Cairo
Attendance: 80,000
Referee: Mutaz Ibrahim (Libya)

**Al Ahly**	**Wydad AC**

GK	31	(Egypt) Mostafa Shobeir
LB	21	(Tunisia) Ali Maâloul
CB	24	(Egypt) Mohamed Abdelmonem
CB	6	(Egypt) Yasser Ibrahim
RB	30	(Egypt) Mohamed Hany (c)	(yellow card) 90+4'
CM	8	(Egypt) Hamdy Fathy
CM	13	(Egypt) Marwan Attia
CM	15	(Mali) Aliou Dieng
LW	14	(Egypt) Hussein El Shahat		(substituted off) 87'
ST	7	(Egypt) Mahmoud Kahraba		(substituted off) 87'
RW	23	(South Africa) Percy Tau
Substitutes:
GK	16	(Egypt) Ali Lotfi
DF	2	(Egypt) Khaled Abdelfattah
DF	4	(Egypt) Mahmoud Metwalli
MF	9	(Egypt) Ahmed Abdel Kader		(substituted on) 87'
MF	17	(Egypt) Amr El Solia
MF	19	(Egypt) Mohamed Magdy Afsha
MF	26	(Algeria) Ahmed Kendouci
FW	10	(Egypt) Mohamed Sherif		(substituted on) 87'
FW	27	(Egypt) Taher Mohamed
Manager:
(Switzerland) Marcel Koller

GK	32	(Morocco) Youssef El Motie
LB	14	(Morocco) Yahia Attiyat Allah	(yellow card) 79'
CB	35	(Democratic Republic of the Congo) Arsène Zola
CB	25	(Morocco) Amine Farhane
RB	22	(Morocco) Ayoub El Amloud	(yellow card) 42'
CM	6	(Morocco) Jalal Daoudi
CM	5	(Morocco) Yahya Jabrane (c)
CM	8	(Morocco) Reda Jaadi
LW	7	(Morocco) Zouhair El Moutaraji		(substituted off) 82'
ST	20	(Senegal) Bouly Sambou
RW	10	(Morocco) Ayman El Hassouni		(substituted off) 73'
Substitutes:
GK	12	(Morocco) Taha Mourid
DF	4	(Morocco) Amine Aboulfath
DF	15	(Morocco) Yahya Nadrani
DF	31	(Morocco) Hamza Ait Allal
MF	2	(Morocco) Ismail Moutaraji
MF	21	(Morocco) Houmam Baaouch
MF	28	(Libya) Muaid Ellafi
FW	11	(Morocco) Mohamed Ounajem		(substituted on) 73'
FW	30	(Morocco) Saifeddine Bouhra		(substituted on) 82'
Manager:
(Belgium) Sven Vandenbroeck

Assistant referees:
Attia Essa Amsaad (Libya)
Khalil Hassani (Tunisia)
Fourth official:
Alhadi Allaou Mahamat (Chad)
Video assistant referee:
Haythem Guirat (Tunisia)
Assistant video assistant referees:
Mustapha Ghorbal (Algeria)
Carine Atezambong Fomo (Cameroon)

**Match rules**
- 90 minutes.
- Nine named substitutes, of which up to five may be used. (Note: Each team was only given three opportunities to make substitutions, excluding substitutions made at half-time.)

==== Statistics ====
First half
Statistic	Al Ahly	Wydad AC
Goals scored	1	0
Total shots	7	5
Shots on target	2	2
Saves	2	1
Ball possession	75%	25%
Corner kicks	3	1
Fouls committed	6	9
Offsides	0	0
Yellow cards	0	1
Red cards	0	0

Second half
Statistic	Al Ahly	Wydad AC
Goals scored	1	1
Total shots	5	7
Shots on target	4	2
Saves	1	3
Ball possession	56%	44%
Corner kicks	2	1
Fouls committed	9	7
Offsides	0	0
Yellow cards	1	1
Red cards	0	0

Overall
Statistic	Al Ahly	Wydad AC
Goals scored	2	1
Total shots	12	12
Shots on target	6	4
Saves	3	4
Ball possession	65%	35%
Corner kicks	5	2
Fouls committed	15	16
Offsides	0	0
Yellow cards	1	2
Red cards	0	0

=== Second leg ===
==== Details ====
11 June 2023
20:00 UTC+1

Wydad AC (Morocco)	1–1	(Egypt) Al Ahly
Attiyat Allah 27'	Report	Abdelmonem 78'

Stade Mohammed V, Casablanca
Attendance: 45,000
Referee: Bamlak Tessema Weyesa (Ethiopia)

**Wydad AC**	**Al Ahly**

GK	32	(Morocco) Youssef El Motie
LB	14	(Morocco) Yahia Attiyat Allah
CB	35	(Democratic Republic of the Congo) Arsène Zola
CB	25	(Morocco) Amine Farhane
RB	22	(Morocco) Ayoub El Amloud
CM	6	(Morocco) Jalal Daoudi
CM	5	(Morocco) Yahya Jabrane (c)
LW	30	(Morocco) Saifeddine Bouhra	(yellow card) 45+6'	(substituted off) 66'
AM	10	(Morocco) Ayman El Hassouni		(substituted off) 80'
RW	11	(Morocco) Mohamed Ounajem		(substituted off) 89'
CF	20	(Senegal) Bouly Sambou
Substitutes:
GK	12	(Morocco) Taha Mourid
DF	4	(Morocco) Amine Aboulfath
DF	15	(Morocco) Yahya Nadrani
MF	2	(Morocco) Ismail Moutaraji
MF	8	(Morocco) Reda Jaadi		(substituted on) 80'
MF	17	(Morocco) Badie Aouk
MF	28	(Libya) Muaid Ellafi
FW	7	(Morocco) Zouhair El Moutaraji		(substituted on) 66'
FW	33	(Morocco) Hamid Ahadad		(substituted on) 89'
Manager:
(Belgium) Sven Vandenbroeck

GK	1	(Egypt) Mohamed El Shenawy (c)
LB	21	(Tunisia) Ali Maâloul	(yellow card) 87'
CB	24	(Egypt) Mohamed Abdelmonem	(yellow card) 90+10'
CB	6	(Egypt) Yasser Ibrahim
RB	30	(Egypt) Mohamed Hany	(yellow card) 90+7'
CM	8	(Egypt) Hamdy Fathy		(substituted off) 72'
CM	13	(Egypt) Marwan Attia		(substituted off) 59'
CM	15	(Mali) Aliou Dieng	(yellow card) 50'
LW	14	(Egypt) Hussein El Shahat	(yellow card) 41'	(substituted off) 59'
ST	7	(Egypt) Mahmoud Kahraba	(yellow card) 36'	(substituted off) 72'
RW	23	(South Africa) Percy Tau		(substituted off) 86'
Substitutes:
GK	16	(Egypt) Ali Lotfi
DF	2	(Egypt) Khaled Abdelfattah
DF	5	(Egypt) Ramy Rabia		(substituted on) 86'
MF	9	(Egypt) Ahmed Abdel Kader		(substituted on) 59'
MF	17	(Egypt) Amr El Solia		(substituted on) 72'
MF	19	(Egypt) Mohamed Magdy Afsha		(substituted on) 59'
MF	26	(Algeria) Ahmed Kendouci
FW	10	(Egypt) Mohamed Sherif		(substituted on) 72'
FW	27	(Egypt) Taher Mohamed
Manager:
(Switzerland) Marcel Koller

Assistant referees:
Elvis Guy Noupue Nguegoue (Cameroon)
Gilbert Cheruiyot (Kenya)
Fourth official:
Pierre Atcho (Gabon)
Video assistant referee:
Peter Waweru (Kenya)
Assistant video assistant referees:
Dahane Beida (Mauritania)
Diana Chikotesha (Zambia)

**Match rules**
- 90 minutes.
- Penalty shoot-out if tied on aggregate and away goals.
- Nine named substitutes, of which up to five may be used.

==== Statistics ====
First half
Statistic	Wydad AC	Al Ahly
Goals scored	1	0
Total shots	2	3
Shots on target	1	0
Saves	0	0
Ball possession	57%	43%
Corner kicks	1	0
Fouls committed	5	10
Offsides	0	1
Yellow cards	1	2
Red cards	0	0

Second half
Statistic	Wydad AC	Al Ahly
Goals scored	0	1
Total shots	4	4
Shots on target	0	3
Saves	2	0
Ball possession	48%	52%
Corner kicks	3	3
Fouls committed	4	9
Offsides	0	1
Yellow cards	0	4
Red cards	0	0

Overall
Statistic	Wydad AC	Al Ahly
Goals scored	1	1
Total shots	6	7
Shots on target	1	3
Saves	2	0
Ball possession	53%	47%
Corner kicks	4	3
Fouls committed	9	19
Offsides	0	2
Yellow cards	1	6
Red cards	0	0

== See also ==
- 2023 CAF Confederation Cup final
- 2023 CAF Super Cup
