= 2022–23 CR Belouizdad season =

CR Belouizdad
2022–23 season
- Owner: MADAR Holding
- President: Mohamed Belhadj (until 6 February 2023); Mehdi Rabehi (from 6 February 2023)
- Head coach: Nabil Kouki (from 5 July 2022)
- Stadium: 20 August 1955 Stadium
- Ligue 1: 1st
- Algerian Cup: Runners-up
- Champions League: Quarter-finals
- Top goalscorer: League: Mohamed Islam Belkhir (8 goals); All: Mohamed Islam Belkhir (11 goals)
- Biggest win: CR Belouizdad 4–1 HB Chelghoum Laïd
- Biggest defeat: USM Khenchela 4–0 CR Belouizdad
Home colours	Away colours

The 2022–23 season, was CR Belouizdad's 56th season and the club's 33rd consecutive season in the top flight of Algerian football. In addition to the domestic league, CR Belouizdad participated in this season's editions of the Algerian Cup and the Champions League.

== Squad list ==
Players and squad numbers last updated on 5 February 2022.
Note: Flags indicate national team as has been defined under FIFA eligibility rules. Players may hold more than one non-FIFA nationality.

No.	Nat.	Position	Name	Date of birth (age)	Signed from
Goalkeepers
1	(Algeria)	GK	Alexis Guendouz	26 January 1996 (aged 26)	(Algeria) USM Alger
16	(Algeria)	GK	Azzedine Doukha	5 August 1986 (aged 36)	(Algeria) JS Kabylie
26	(Algeria)	GK	Ahmed Abdelkader	19 February 1999 (aged 23)	Unattached
Defenders
2	(Algeria)	CB	Chouaib Keddad	25 July 1994 (aged 28)	(Algeria) ASO Chlef
4	(Algeria)	CB	Mouad Hadded	22 February 1997 (aged 25)	(Algeria) MC Alger
12	(Algeria)	CB	Ahmed Ait Abdessalem	30 August 1997 (aged 25)	(Algeria) JS Kabylie
18	(Algeria)	CB	Sofiane Bouchar	21 May 1994 (aged 28)	(Algeria) MC Oran
20	(Algeria)	LB	Youcef Laouafi	1 January 1996 (aged 27)	(Tunisia) ES Sahel
21	(Algeria)	RB	Aimen Bouguerra	10 January 1997 (aged 25)	(Algeria) Paradou AC
22	(Algeria)	RB	Mokhtar Belkhiter	15 January 1992 (aged 30)	(Tunisia) Club Africain
23	(Algeria)	LB	Abdelmoumen Chikhi	29 February 1996 (aged 26)	(Algeria) JS Kabylie
Midfielders
5	(Algeria)	MF	Houssem Eddine Mrezigue	23 March 2000 (aged 22)	(Algeria) Youth system
6	(Algeria)	MF	Zakaria Draoui	12 February 1994 (aged 28)	(Algeria) ES Sétif
8	(Algeria)	MF	Mohamed Islam Bakir	13 July 1996 (aged 26)	(Tunisia) CS Sfaxien
10	(Algeria)	MF	Abderrahmane Bourdim	14 June 1994 (aged 28)	(Algeria) MC Alger
15	(Algeria)	MF	Housseyn Selmi	11 February 1993 (aged 29)	(Algeria) CA Batna
17	(Algeria)	MF	Belaid Hamidi	7 May 1996 (aged 26)	(Algeria) JS Saoura
25	(Algeria)	MF	Miloud Rebiai	12 December 1993 (aged 29)	(Algeria) MC Alger
Forwards
7	(Algeria)	FW	Ishak Boussouf	August 22, 2001 (aged 21)	(Belgium) Lommel
11	(Republic of Ireland)	FW	Ali Reghba	14 January 2000 (aged 22)	(England) Leicester City
24	(Nigeria)	FW	Anayo Iwuala	March 20, 1999 (aged 23)	(Tunisia) ES Tunis
28	(Algeria)	FW	Mohamed Islam Belkhir	March 16, 2001 (aged 21)	(Algeria) Youth system
42	(Cameroon)	FW	Leonel Wamba	1 September 2002 (aged 20)	(Latvia) FK Spartaks Jūrmala

== Transfers ==
=== In ===
==== Summer ====
Date	Pos	Player	From club	Transfer fee	Source
5 July 2022	FW	(Algeria) Idriss Saadi	(France) SC Bastia	Free transfer	
5 July 2022	GK	(Algeria) Alexis Guendouz	USM Alger	Free transfer	
12 July 2022	GK	(Algeria) Redouane Maachou	USM Bel Abbès	Loan return	
13 July 2022	MF	(Algeria) Islam Bouloudène	NA Hussein Dey	Free transfer	
14 July 2022	RB	(Algeria) Aimen Bouguerra	Paradou AC	Free transfer	
14 July 2022	CB	(Algeria) Mouad Hadded	MC Alger	Free transfer	
18 July 2022	LB	(Algeria) Youcef Laouafi	(Tunisia) ES Sahel	Free transfer	
21 July 2022	FW	(Cameroon) Leonel Wamba	(Latvia) FK Spartaks Jūrmala	Free transfer	
24 July 2022	MF	(Algeria) Belaid Hamidi	JS Saoura	35,000,000 DA	
1 August 2022	FW	(Algeria) Ishak Boussouf	(Belgium) Lommel	Loan	
4 August 2022	MF	(Algeria) Miloud Rebiai	MC Alger	Free transfer	
12 August 2022	LB	(Algeria) Abdelmoumen Chikhi	JS Kabylie	Free transfer	
12 August 2022	FW	(Algeria) Ahmedine Daoudi	(France) Stade Beaucairois	Free transfer	
16 August 2022	FW	(Nigeria) Anayo Iwuala	(Tunisia) ES Tunis	Loan	
22 August 2022	GK	(Algeria) Azzedine Doukha	JS Kabylie	15,0000,000 DA	

=== Out ===
==== Summer ====
Date	Pos	Player	To club	Transfer fee	Source
18 July 2022	FW	(Algeria) Bouzid Dadache	Unattached	Free transfer	
18 July 2022	FW	(Algeria) Mahi Benhamou	Unattached	Free transfer	
20 July 2022	FW	(Algeria) Khaled Bousseliou	USM Alger	Free transfer	
21 July 2022	MF	(Algeria) Larbi Tabti	ES Sétif	Free transfer	
30 July 2022	LB	(Algeria) Chemseddine Nessakh	ASO Chlef	Free transfer	
1 August 2022	FW	(Algeria) Kheireddine Merzougui	MC Alger	Free transfer	
5 August 2022	LB	(Algeria) Sabri Cheraitia	JS Kabylie	Free transfer	
17 August 2022	LB	(Algeria) Chems-Eddine Bekkouche	(Spain) Levante UD	Loan	
24 August 2022	MF	(Algeria) Adel Djerrar	MC Oran	Free transfer	
27 August 2022	GK	(Algeria) Toufik Moussaoui	(Morocco) OC Khouribga	Free transfer	

==== Winter ====
Date	Pos	Player	To club	Transfer fee	Source
2 January 2023	FW	(Algeria) Idriss Saadi	Unattached	Released	
26 January 2023	MF	(Algeria) Islam Bouloudène	(Saudi Arabia) Wej SC	Free transfer	
30 January 2023	FW	(Algeria) Karim Aribi	(Saudi Arabia) Al-Qadsiah	Free transfer	
1 February 2023	FW	(Algeria) Hicham Khalfallah	MC El Bayadh	Loan	

=== New contracts ===
No.	Pos	Player	Contract length	Contract end	Date	Source
15	MF	(Algeria) Housseyn Selmi	2 years	2024	27 June 2022	
8	MF	(Algeria) Mohamed Islam Bakir	2 years	2024	12 July 2022	
14	FW	(Algeria) Hicham Khalfallah	2 years	2024	12 July 2022	

== Competitions ==
=== Overview ===
Competition	Record								Started round	Final position / round	First match	Last match
Competition	G	W	D	L	GF	GA	GD	Win %	Started round	Final position / round	First match	Last match
Ligue 1	30	18	10	2	44	21	+23	60.00	—N/a	Winners	26 August 2022	15 July 2023
Algerian Cup	6	5	0	1	12	5	+7	83.33	Round of 64	Runners-up	14 February 2023	23 June 2023
Champions League	12	5	2	5	12	10	+2	41.67	First round	Quarter-finals	10 September 2022	29 April 2023
Total	48	28	12	8	68	36	+32	58.33				

Updated to match played 15 July 2023
Source: Competitions

=== Ligue 1 ===
==== League table ====
Pos	Team	Pld	W	D	L	GF	GA	GD	Pts	Qualification or relegation
1	CR Belouizdad (C)	30	18	10	2	44	21	+23	64	Qualification for CAF Champions League
2	CS Constantine	30	14	8	8	39	26	+13	50	Qualification for CAF Champions League
3	MC Alger	30	12	11	7	21	20	+1	47	
4	MC El Bayadh	30	13	7	10	34	25	+9	46	
5	JS Saoura	30	11	9	10	32	25	+7	42	

Updated to match(es) played on 15 July 2023. Source: the-sports.org
Rules for classification: 1) points; 2) head-to-head points; 3) head-to-head goal difference; 4) goal difference; 5) total goals; 6) fairplay ranking; 7) playoff.
(C) Champions

==== Results summary ====
Overall								Home						Away					
Pld	W	D	L	GF	GA	GD	Pts	W	D	L	GF	GA	GD	W	D	L	GF	GA	GD
30	18	10	2	44	21	+23	64	11	4	0	26	8	+18	7	6	2	18	13	+5

Last updated: 15 July 2023.
Source: Competitive matches

=== Results by round ===
Round	1	2	3	4	5	6	7	8	9	10	11	12	13	14	15	16	17	18	19	20	21	22	23	24	25	26	27	28	29	30
Ground	H	A	H	A	H	A	H	A	H	H	A	H	A	H	A	A	H	A	H	A	H	A	H	A	A	H	A	H	A	H
Result	W	W	W	D	D	W	D	W	W	W	W	W	D	W	W	W	D	L	W	D	W	D	D	D	W	W	D	W	L	W
Position	1	1	1	3	3	2	2	1	1	1	1	1	1	1	1	1	1	1	1	1	1	1	1	1	1	1	1	1	1	1

Updated to match(es) played on 15 July 2023. Source: Competitive matches
A = Away; H = Home; W = Win; D = Draw; L = Loss

==== Matches ====
The league fixtures were announced on 19 July 2022.

26 August 2022 Round 1	CR Belouizdad	4–1	HB Chelghoum Laïd	Belouizdad
17:00	Aribi 6' (pen.), 42'; Belkhir 71'; Bourdim 90'	Report	Zouad 83'	Stadium: 20 August 1955 Stadium; Attendance: 0 (close doors); Referee: Radouane Alou

2 September 2022 Round 2	Paradou AC	0–1	CR Belouizdad	Dar El Beïda
16:45		Report	Belkhir 45'	Stadium: Omar Benrabah Stadium; Referee: Houssem Benyahia

6 September 2022 Round 3	CR Belouizdad	2–0	MC Oran	Belouizdad
16:30	Aribi 14' (pen.), 44'	Report		Stadium: 20 August 1955 Stadium; Referee: Mohamed Tahar Milia

2 October 2022 Round 6	JS Saoura	0–1	CR Belouizdad	Béchar
20:00		Report	Wamba 69'	Stadium: 20 August 1955 Stadium; Referee: Nabil Boukhalfa

21 October 2022 Round 9	CR Belouizdad	3–1	NC Magra	Belouizdad
15:00	Mrezigue 63'; Iwuala 80'; Bouguerra 90+5' (pen.)	Report	Banouh 88'	Stadium: 20 August 1955 Stadium; Referee: Mehadji Tayeb Bouderbali

25 October 2022 Round 4	ES Sétif	1–1	CR Belouizdad	Sétif
18:00	Kendouci 53'	Report	Bourdim 88'	Stadium: 8 May 1945 Stadium; Referee: Mustapha Ghorbal

5 November 2022 Round 10	CR Belouizdad	1–0	MC El Bayadh	Belouizdad
15:00	Bourdim 90+5' (pen.)	Report		Stadium: 20 August 1955 Stadium; Referee: Rafik Aouina

9 November 2022 Round 11	ASO Chlef	0–1	CR Belouizdad	Relizane
15:00		Report	Iwuala 74'	Stadium: Tahar Zoughari Stadium; Referee: Nabil Boukhalfa

29 November 2022 Round 12	CR Belouizdad	2–1	CS Constantine	Belouizdad
15:00	Bakir 24'; Belkhir 83'	Report	Lakdja 39'	Stadium: 20 August 1955 Stadium; Referee: Abdellah Benchehida

3 December 2022 Round 5	CR Belouizdad	0–0	MC Alger	Belouizdad
15:00		Report		Stadium: 20 August 1955 Stadium; Referee: Abdelali Ibrir

7 December 2022 Round 13	USM Alger	2–2	CR Belouizdad	Dar El Beïda
15:00	Merili 4'; Meziane 14'	Report	Belkhir 39'; Bourdim 43'	Stadium: Omar Benrabah Stadium; Referee: Lahlou Benbraham

11 December 2022 Round 14	CR Belouizdad	2–0	USM Khenchela	Belouizdad
15:00	Belkhadem 56', 63'	Report		Stadium: 20 August 1955 Stadium; Referee: Houssam Benyahia

20 December 2022 Round 7	CR Belouizdad	1–1	US Biskra	Belouizdad
15:00	Belkhir 62'	Report	Boukarroum 86' (pen.)	Stadium: 20 August 1955 Stadium; Referee: Mohamed Bouteraa

24 December 2022 Round 15	JS Kabylie	1–2	CR Belouizdad	Tizi Ouzou
16:00	Boualia 65'	Report	Bouras 58'; Iwuala 87'	Stadium: 1 November 1954 Stadium; Referee: Youcef Gamouh

28 December 2022 Round 8	RC Arbaâ	0–4	CR Belouizdad	Larbaâ
14:30		Report	Wamba 8'; Selmi 17'; Bakir 22'; Bourdim 82'	Stadium: Ismaïl Makhlouf Stadium; Referee: Mehdi Abid Charef

2 March 2023 Round 16	HB Chelghoum Laïd	0–1	CR Belouizdad	Chelghoum Laïd
15:00		Report	Hadded 6'	Stadium: 11 December 1961 Stadium; Referee: Zinelaabidine Dakhane

5 April 2023 Round 21	CR Belouizdad	2–0	JS Saoura	Algiers
22:00	Iwuala 38'; Bouguerra 85'	Report		Stadium: Stade du 5 Juillet; Referee: Mustapha Ghorbal

9 April 2023 Round 22	US Biskra	1–1	CR Belouizdad	Biskra
22:00	Ounnas 45'	Report	Bourdim 84' (pen.)	Stadium: 18 February Stadium; Referee: Akram Mechairia

13 April 2023 Round 17	CR Belouizdad	1–1	Paradou AC	Algiers
22:30	Keddad 11' (o.g.)	Report	Wamba 13'	Stadium: Stade du 5 Juillet; Referee: Abdelali Ibrir

17 April 2023 Round 18	MC Oran	3–1	CR Belouizdad	Oran
22:30	Belaribi 5'; Saihi 39'; Dahar 72' (pen.)	Report	Reghba 33'	Stadium: Ahmed Zabana Stadium; Referee: Nadjib Meziani

5 May 2023 Round 19	CR Belouizdad	1–0	ES Sétif	Belouizdad
16:00	Bouras 22'	Report		Stadium: 20 August 1955 Stadium; Referee: Bilel Soltani

9 May 2023 Round 20	MC Alger	0–0	CR Belouizdad	Algiers
18:00		Report		Stadium: Stade du 5 Juillet; Referee: Houssam Benyahia

17 May 2023 Round 23	CR Belouizdad	0–0	RC Arbaâ	Belouizdad
16:00		Report		Stadium: 20 August 1955 Stadium; Referee: Abdelmoumen Touabti

31 May 2023 Round 24	NC Magra	0–0	CR Belouizdad	Magra
16:00		Report		Stadium: Boucheligue Brothers Stadium; Referee: Mohamed Bouteraa

6 June 2023 Round 25	MC El Bayadh	1–3	CR Belouizdad	El Bayadh
16:30	Khalfallah 14'	Report	Wamba 6', 64' (pen.); Belkhir 75'	Stadium: Zakaria Medjdoub Stadium; Referee: Lahlou Benbraham

1 July 2023 Round 26	CR Belouizdad	1–0	ASO Chlef	Belouizdad
17:00	Wamba 30'	Report		Stadium: 20 August 1955 Stadium; Referee: Bilal Soltani

4 July 2023 Round 27	CS Constantine	0–0	CR Belouizdad	Constantine
17:00		Report		Stadium: Ramadane Ben Abdelmalek Stadium; Referee: Houssam Benyahia

7 July 2023 Round 28	CR Belouizdad	3–1	USM Alger	Belouizdad
17:15	Wamba 45+1' (pen.); Chikhi 53'; Belkhir 69'	Report	Belkacemi 25'	Stadium: 20 August 1955 Stadium; Referee: Mohamed Amine Benzohra

10 July 2023 Round 29	USM Khenchela	4–0	CR Belouizdad	Khenchela
17:15	Bayazid 36', 39', 51'; Semahi 90+4'	Report		Stadium: Amar Hamam Stadium; Referee: Abdennacer Baatouche

15 July 2023 Round 30	CR Belouizdad	3–2	JS Kabylie	Belouizdad
17:15	Belkhir 45+2' (pen.); Bouras 48'; Adjout 82'	Report	Mouaki 19'; Boukerou 79'	Stadium: 20 August 1955 Stadium; Referee: Abdelali Ibrir

=== Algerian Cup ===
14 February 2023 Round of 64	CR Belouizdad	3–2 (a.e.t.)	MC El Eulma	Algiers
14:00	Belkhadem 5'; Belkhir 53'; Rebiai 92'	Report	Sahraoui 57', 65'	Stadium: 20 August 1955 Stadium; Referee: Boubekeur Zouaoui
Note: Lineups for CR Belouizdad - Doukha, Bouguerra, Chikhi, Ait Abdesslem, Bouchar, Rebiai, Selmi (Zaouchi, 115'), Azzi (Bakir, 79'), Bourdim (Iwuala, 90'), Belkhir (Hamadi, 115'), Belkhadem (Wamba, 79').

22 March 2023 Round of 32	US Chaouia	1–2	CR Belouizdad	Oum El Bouaghi
14:00	Elhadj Khelouf 86'	Report	Iwuala 38'; Bouguerra 90'	Stadium: Hassouna Zerdani Stadium; Referee: El Hadj Aissa Semmache
Note: Lineups for CR Belouizdad - Guendouz, Bouguerra, Chikhi, Keddad, Hadded, Draoui (Ait Abdesslem, 90'), Mrezigue, Bourdim (Reghba, 77'), Bakir (Rebiai, 90'), Iwuala (Boussouf, 83'), Wamba (Hamadi, 90').

13 May 2023 Round of 16	JS El Biar	0–2	CR Belouizdad	Algiers
18:00		Report	Boussouf 45'; Draoui 68'	Stadium: Stade du 5 Juillet; Referee: Mohamed Bouteraa
Note: Lineups for CR Belouizdad - Doukha, Bouguerra, Chikhi, Azzi (Hadded, 82'), Bouchar, Rebiai, Draoui (Selmi, 72'), Bakir (Bouras, 82'), Boussouf (Wamba, 72'), Reghba (Iwuala, 85'), Belkhir.

21 May 2023 Quarter-finals	CR Belouizdad	3–0	AS Khroub	Algiers
16:00	Boussouf 35'; Reghba 63'; Rebiai 70'	Report		Stadium: Stade du 5 Juillet; Referee: Mehadji Tayeb Bouderbali
Note: Lineups for CR Belouizdad - Guendouz, Belkhiter, Laouafi (Chikhi, 81'), Bouchar, Keddad, Rebiai, Selmi (Bouguerra, 76'), Bouras (Reghba, 59'), Boussouf, Wamba (Bourdim, 76'), Belkhir (Bakir, 59').

27 May 2023 Semi-finals	NC Magra	0–1	CR Belouizdad	Constantine
18:00		Report	Boussouf 7'	Stadium: Mohamed Hamlaoui Stadium; Referee: Youcef Gamouh
Note: Lineups for CR Belouizdad - Guendouz, Belkhiter, Laouafi, Bouchar, Keddad, Rebiai, Draoui, Bouras (Selmi, 75'), Boussouf (Bourdim, 81'), Wamba (Reghba, 81'), Iwuala (Belkhir, 75').

22 June 2023 Final	ASO Chlef	2–1 (a.e.t.)	CR Belouizdad	Oran
17:00	Addadi 67'; Morsli 94'	Report	Wamba 8' (pen.)	Stadium: Miloud Hadefi Stadium; Referee: Lahlou Benbraham
Note: Lineups for CR Belouizdad - Guendouz, Belkhiter, Laouafi (Bouguerra, 17'), Bouchar, Keddad, Rebiai (Bakir, 106'), Selmi (Bourdim, 77'), Bouras, Boussouf (Belkhir, 77'), Wamba, Iwuala (Reghba, 106').

=== Champions League ===
==== Qualifying rounds ====
The draw of the qualifying rounds was held on 9 August 2022.

===== First round =====
10 September 2022 First leg	Bo Rangers (Sierra Leone)	0–0	(Algeria) CR Belouizdad	Monrovia (Liberia) (Note: Teams from Sierra Leone played their home matches in Liberia, since their only stadium which satisfies the criteria of hosting international matches - the Siaka Steven Stadium in Freetown is undergoing long term renovations.)
17:00		Report		Stadium: SKD Stadium; Referee: Alhasan Bass (Gambia)

17 September 2022 Second leg	CR Belouizdad (Algeria)	3–0 (3–0 agg.)	(Sierra Leone) Bo Rangers	Sétif
19:30 UTC+1	Keddad 33'; Aribi 86', 89'	Report		Stadium: 8 May 1945 Stadium; Referee: Shuhoub Abdulbasit (Libya)

===== Second round =====
9 October 2022 First leg	Djoliba (Mali)	2–1	(Algeria) CR Belouizdad	Bamako
16:00 UTC+0		Report	Belkhir 10'	Stadium: Stade du 26 Mars; Referee: Maguette N'Diaye (Senegal)

14 October 2022 Second leg	CR Belouizdad (Algeria)	2–0 (3–2 agg.)	(Mali) Djoliba	Sétif
19:00 UTC+1	Rebiai 27'; Bourdim 80'	Report		Stadium: 8 May 1945 Stadium; Referee: Mehrez Melki (Tunisia)

==== Group stage ====
The draw for the group stage was held on 12 December 2022, 12:00 GMT (14:00 local time, UTC+2), at the CAF headquarters in Cairo, Egypt. The 16 winners of the second round of qualifying were drawn into four groups of four.

The teams were seeded by their performances in the CAF competitions for the previous five seasons (CAF 5-year ranking points shown next to every team). Each group contained one team from each of Pot 1, Pot 2, Pot 3, and Pot 4, and each team was allocated to the positions in their group according to their pot.

Pos	Team	Pld	W	D	L	GF	GA	GD	Pts	Qualification	EST	CRB	ZSC	MSC
1	(Tunisia) Espérance de Tunis	6	3	2	1	6	4	+2	11	Advance to knockout stage	—	0–0	2–0	1–0
2	(Algeria) CR Belouizdad	6	3	1	2	4	2	+2	10	Advance to knockout stage	0–1	—	2–0	1–0
3	(Egypt) Zamalek	6	2	1	3	7	9	−2	7		3–1	0–1	—	4–3
4	(Sudan) Al Merrikh	6	1	2	3	5	7	−2	5		1–1	1–0	0–0	—

Source: CAF

10 February 2023 Matchday 1	Zamalek (Egypt)	0–1	(Algeria) CR Belouizdad	Cairo
18:00 UTC+2		Report	Wamba 57' (pen.)	Stadium: Cairo International Stadium; Referee: Issa Sy (Senegal)

18 February 2023 Matchday 2	CR Belouizdad (Algeria)	0–1	(Tunisia) Espérance de Tunis	Algiers
20:00 UTC+1		Report	Elhouni 80'	Stadium: Stade du 5 Juillet; Referee: Abongile Tom (South Africa)

24 February 2023 Matchday 3	Al Merrikh (Sudan)	1–0	(Algeria) CR Belouizdad	Benghazi (Note: Al Merrikh play their group stage home matches at Martyrs of February Stadium, Benghazi (Libya), instead of their regular home stadium Al Merrikh Stadium, Omdurman, which did not meet CAF requirements.)
15:00 UTC+2	Paulo Sérgio 32' (pen.)	Report		Stadium: Martyrs of February Stadium; Referee: Boubou Traoré (Mali)

7 March 2023 Matchday 4	CR Belouizdad (Algeria)	1–0	(Sudan) Al Merrikh	Annaba (Note: The CR Belouizdad v Al Merrikh match was played at 19 May 1956 Stadium, Annaba, instead of 5 July Stadium, Algiers, due to the high intensity of matches in the same period at the stadium.)
20:00 UTC+1	Belkhir 35'	Report		Stadium: 19 May 1956 Stadium; Referee: Jean Jacques Ndala Ngambo (DR Congo)

17 March 2023 Matchday 5	CR Belouizdad (Algeria)	2–0	(Egypt) Zamalek	Algiers
20:00 UTC+1	Draoui 75'; Wamba 79'	Report		Stadium: Stade du 5 Juillet; Referee: Ibrahim Mutaz (Libya)

1 April 2023 Matchday 6	Espérance de Tunis (Tunisia)	0–0	(Algeria) CR Belouizdad	Tunis
23:00 UTC+1		Report		Stadium: Hammadi Agrebi Stadium; Referee: Pierre Atcho (Gabon)

==== Knockout stage ====
The bracket was decided after the draw for the knockout stage (quarter-finals, semi-finals and finals), which was held on 5 April 2023, 18:30 GMT (20:30 local time, UTC+2), at the CAF headquarters in Cairo, Egypt.

===== Quarter-finals =====
22 April 2023 First leg	CR Belouizdad (Algeria)	1–4	(South Africa) Mamelodi Sundowns	Algiers
20:00 UTC+1	Rebiaï 45+3'	Report	Shalulile 6', 51'; Maema 20'; Mailula 90+2'	Stadium: Nelson Mandela Stadium; Referee: Peter Waweru (Kenya)

29 April 2023 Second leg	Mamelodi Sundowns (South Africa)	2–1 (6–2 agg.)	(Algeria) CR Belouizdad	Pretoria
15:00 UTC+2	Zwane 45'; Morena 49'	Report	Bouchar 24'	Stadium: Loftus Versfeld Stadium; Referee: Abdel Aziz Mohamed Bouh (Mauritania)

== Squad information ==
=== Playing statistics ===
No.	Pos	Nat	Player	Total		Ligue 1		Algerian Cup		Champions League	
No.	Pos	Nat	Player	Apps	Goals	Apps	Goals	Apps	Goals	Apps	Goals
Goalkeepers
1	GK	(Algeria) ALG	Alexis Guendouz	41	0	25	0	4	0	12	0
16	GK	(Algeria) ALG	Azzedine Doukha	4	0	2	0	2	0	0	0
26	GK	(Algeria) ALG	Ahmed Abdelkader	3	0	3	0	0	0	0	0
Defenders
2	DF	(Algeria) ALG	Chouaib Keddad	30	1	18	0	4	0	8	1
4	DF	(Algeria) ALG	Mouad Hadded	23	1	15	1	2	0	6	0
12	DF	(Algeria) ALG	Ahmed Ait Abdesslem	8	0	4	0	2	0	2	0
18	DF	(Algeria) ALG	Sofiane Bouchar	38	1	23	0	5	0	10	1
20	DF	(Algeria) ALG	Youcef Laouafi	40	0	25	0	3	0	12	0
21	DF	(Algeria) ALG	Aimen Bouguerra	28	3	17	2	5	1	6	0
22	DF	(Algeria) ALG	Mokhtar Belkhiter	36	0	23	0	3	0	10	0
23	DF	(Algeria) ALG	Abdelmoumen Chikhi	21	1	13	1	4	0	4	0
25	DF	(Algeria) ALG	Miloud Rebiai	29	4	14	0	6	2	9	2
37	DF	(Algeria) ALG	Mohamed Azzi	9	0	6	0	2	0	1	0
72	DF	(Algeria) ALG	Zouheyr Benyoub	3	0	3	0	0	0	0	0
Midfielders
5	MF	(Algeria) ALG	Houssem Eddine Mrezigue	25	1	14	1	1	0	10	0
6	MF	(Algeria) ALG	Zakaria Draoui	36	2	22	0	3	1	11	1
8	MF	(Algeria) ALG	Mohamed Islam Bakir	40	2	24	2	5	0	11	0
10	MF	(Algeria) ALG	Abderrahmane Bourdim	31	7	22	6	4	0	5	1
15	MF	(Algeria) ALG	Housseyn Selmi	30	1	20	1	5	0	5	0
17	MF	(Algeria) ALG	Belaid Hamidi	10	0	7	0	0	0	3	0
38	MF	(Algeria) ALG	Akram Bouras	27	3	16	3	4	0	7	0
43	MF	(Algeria) ALG	Mounir Belhaidja	2	0	1	0	1	0	0	0
44	MF	(Algeria) ALG	Youcef Zaouchi	2	0	1	0	1	0	0	0
Forwards
7	FW	(Algeria) ALG	Ishak Boussouf	25	3	18	0	5	3	2	0
11	FW	(Algeria) ALG	Ali Reghba	19	2	13	1	2	1	4	0
24	FW	(Nigeria) NGR	Anayo Iwuala	40	5	23	4	5	1	12	0
28	FW	(Algeria) ALG	Mohamed Islam Belkhir	43	11	26	8	5	1	12	2
34	FW	(Algeria) ALG	Ahmedine Daoudi	1	0	1	0	0	0	0	0
35	FW	(Algeria) ALG	Mohamed Belkhadem	9	3	8	2	1	1	0	0
42	FW	(Cameroon) CMR	Leonel Wamba	42	11	25	7	6	2	11	2
45	FW	(Algeria) ALG	Abdelali Hamadi	6	0	4	0	2	0	0	0
47	FW	(Algeria) ALG	Abdelghani Tebbani	2	0	2	0	0	0	0	0
75	FW	(Algeria) ALG	Lounas Adjout	3	1	2	1	01	0	0	0
Players transferred out during the season
27	MF	(Algeria) ALG	Islam Bouloudène	0	0	0	0	0	0	0	0
9	FW	(Algeria) ALG	Karim Aribi	15	6	11	4	0	0	4	2
14	FW	(Algeria) ALG	Hicham Khalfallah	8	0	8	0	0	0	0	0
19	FW	(Algeria) ALG	Idriss Saadi	8	0	4	0	0	0	4	0

Last updated: 15 July 2023
Source: soccerway.com

=== Goalscorers ===
As of 15 July 2023

Includes all competitive matches. The list is sorted alphabetically by surname when total goals are equal.

No.	Nat.	Player	Pos.	L 1	AC	CL 1	TOTAL
28	(Algeria)	Mohamed Islam Belkhir	FW	8	1	2	11
42	(Cameroon)	Leonel Wamba	FW	7	1	2	10
10	(Algeria)	Abderrahmane Bourdim	MF	6	0	1	7
9	(Algeria)	Karim Aribi	FW	4	0	2	6
24	(Nigeria)	Anayo Iwuala	FW	4	1	0	5
25	(Algeria)	Miloud Rebiai	DF	0	2	2	4
38	(Algeria)	Akram Bouras	FW	3	0	0	3
35	(Algeria)	Mohamed Belkhadem	FW	2	1	0	3
21	(Algeria)	Aimen Bouguerra	DF	2	1	0	3
7	(Algeria)	Ishak Boussouf	FW	0	3	0	3
8	(Algeria)	Mohamed Islam Bakir	MF	2	0	0	2
11	(Algeria)	Ali Reghba	FW	1	1	0	2
6	(Algeria)	Zakaria Draoui	MF	0	1	1	2
2	(Algeria)	Chouaib Keddad	DF	0	0	1	1
5	(Algeria)	Houssem Eddine Mrezigue	MF	1	0	0	1
15	(Algeria)	Housseyn Selmi	MF	1	0	0	1
4	(Algeria)	Mouad Hadded	DF	1	0	0	1
18	(Algeria)	Sofiane Bouchar	DF	0	0	1	1
23	(Algeria)	Abdelmoumen Chikhi	DF	1	0	0	1
75	(Algeria)	Lounas Adjout	FW	1	0	0	1
Own Goals				0	0	0	0
Totals				44	12	12	68
