= 2022–23 CAF Champions League group stage =

International football competition

- Dates: 10 February – 1 April 2023

Tournament statistics
- Matches played: 48
- Goals scored: 108 (2.25 per match)

The 2022–23 CAF Champions League group stage began on 10 February and ended on 1 April 2023. A total of 16 teams competed in the group stage to decide the eight places in the knockout stage of the 2022–23 CAF Champions League.

== Draw ==
The draw for the group stage was held on 12 December 2022, 12:00 GMT (14:00 local time, UTC+2), at the CAF headquarters in Cairo, Egypt. The 16 winners of the second round of qualifying were drawn into four groups of four.

The teams were seeded by their performances in the CAF competitions for the previous five seasons (CAF 5-year ranking points shown next to every team). Each group contained one team from each of Pot 1, Pot 2, Pot 3, and Pot 4, and each team was allocated to the positions in their group according to their pot.

Pot 1
Team	Pts
(Egypt) Al Ahly	78
(Morocco) Wydad AC	71
(Tunisia) Espérance de Tunis	58
(Morocco) Raja CA	54

Pot 2
Team	Pts
(South Africa) Mamelodi Sundowns	46
(Egypt) Zamalek	43
(Angola) Petro de Luanda	31
(Guinea) Horoya	31

Pot 3
Team	Pts
(Tanzania) Simba	28
(Algeria) CR Belouizdad	27
(Algeria) JS Kabylie	22
(Sudan) Al Hilal	19.5

Pot 4
Team	Pts
(Democratic Republic of the Congo) AS Vita Club	17
(Cameroon) Coton Sport	14.5
(Sudan) Al Merrikh	9
(Uganda) Vipers	—

== Format ==
In the group stage, each group was played on a home-and-away round-robin basis. The winners and runners-up of each group advanced to the quarter-finals of the knockout stage.

=== Tiebreakers ===
The teams were ranked according to points (3 points for a win, 1 point for a draw, 0 points for a loss). If tied on points, tiebreakers were applied in the following order (Regulations III. 20 & 21):

1. Points in head-to-head matches among tied teams;
2. Goal difference in head-to-head matches among tied teams;
3. Goals scored in head-to-head matches among tied teams;
4. Away goals scored in head-to-head matches among tied teams;
5. If more than two teams were tied, and after applying all head-to-head criteria above, a subset of teams were still tied, all head-to-head criteria above were reapplied exclusively to this subset of teams;
6. Goal difference in all group matches;
7. Goals scored in all group matches;
8. Away goals scored in all group matches;
9. Drawing of lots.

== Schedule ==
The schedule of each matchday was as follows.

Matchday	Dates	Matches
Matchday 1	10–11 February 2023	Team 1 vs. Team 4, Team 2 vs. Team 3
Matchday 2	17–18 February 2023	Team 3 vs. Team 1, Team 4 vs. Team 2
Matchday 3	24–25 February 2023	Team 4 vs. Team 3, Team 1 vs. Team 2
Matchday 4	7 March 2023	Team 3 vs. Team 4, Team 2 vs. Team 1
Matchday 5	17–18 March 2023	Team 4 vs. Team 1, Team 3 vs. Team 2
Matchday 6	31 March – 1 April 2023	Team 1 vs. Team 3, Team 2 vs. Team 4

== Groups ==
=== Group A ===
Pos	Team	Pld	W	D	L	GF	GA	GD	Pts	Qualification	WAC	JSK	APL	ASV
1	(Morocco) Wydad AC	6	4	1	1	7	1	+6	13	Advance to knockout stage	—	3–0	1–0	1–0
2	(Algeria) JS Kabylie	6	3	1	2	4	5	−1	10	Advance to knockout stage	1–0	—	1–0	2–1
3	(Angola) Petro de Luanda	6	2	1	3	3	5	−2	7		0–2	0–0	—	1–0
4	(Democratic Republic of the Congo) AS Vita Club	6	1	1	4	3	6	−3	4		0–0	1–0	1–2	—

Source: CAF
Rules for classification: Group stage tiebreakers
11 February 2023
14:00 UTC+1

Petro de Luanda (Angola)	0–0	(Algeria) JS Kabylie
	Report

Estádio 11 de Novembro, Luanda
Referee: Bamlak Tessema Weyesa (Ethiopia)
3 March 2023 (Note: The Wydad AC v AS Vita Club match, originally scheduled to be played on 10 or 11 February 2023, was rescheduled to be played on 3 March 2023 due to Wydad AC's participation in the 2022 FIFA Club World Cup in Morocco between 1 and 11 February 2023.)
20:00 UTC+1

Wydad AC (Morocco)	1–0	(Democratic Republic of the Congo) AS Vita Club
Magema 55' (o.g.)	Report

Stade Mohammed V, Casablanca
Referee: Mahmood Ismail (Sudan)

17 February 2023
20:00 UTC+1

JS Kabylie (Algeria)	1–0	(Morocco) Wydad AC
Souyad 87'	Report

Stade du 5 Juillet, Algiers (Note: JS Kabylie played their group stage home matches at Stade du 5 Juillet, Algiers, instead of their regular home stadium 1 November 1954 Stadium, Tizi Ouzou, which did not meet CAF requirements.)
Referee: Sadok Selmi (Tunisia)
18 February 2023
17:00 UTC+1

AS Vita Club (Democratic Republic of the Congo)	1–2	(Angola) Petro de Luanda
Kabwe 82'	Report	Azulão 32'; Cruz 65'

Stade Alphonse Massemba-Débat, Brazzaville (Congo)
Referee: Mohamed Marouf Eid Mansour (Egypt)

24 February 2023
20:00 UTC+1

Wydad AC (Morocco)	1–0	(Angola) Petro de Luanda
Jabrane 34' (pen.)	Report

Stade Mohammed V, Casablanca
Attendance: 41,413
Referee: Ibrahim Kalilou Traore (Ivory Coast)
25 February 2023
14:00 UTC+1

AS Vita Club (Democratic Republic of the Congo)	1–0	(Algeria) JS Kabylie
Mabidi 65'	Report

Stade Alphonse Massemba-Débat, Brazzaville (Congo)
Referee: Djindo Louis Houngnandande (Benin)

11 March 2023
17:00 UTC+1

Petro de Luanda (Angola)	0–2	(Morocco) Wydad AC
	Report	Zola 59'; Sambou 90'

Estádio 11 de Novembro, Luanda
Referee: Pierre Atcho (Gabon)
11 March 2023
20:00 UTC+1

JS Kabylie (Algeria)	2–1	(Democratic Republic of the Congo) AS Vita Club
Benzaid 63'; Nait Salem 86'	Report	Tchakei 55'

Stade du 5 Juillet, Algiers
Referee: Abdel Aziz Mohamed Bouh (Mauritania)

18 March 2023
14:00 UTC+1

AS Vita Club (Democratic Republic of the Congo)	0–0	(Morocco) Wydad AC
	Report

Stade Alphonse Massemba-Débat, Brazzaville (Congo)
Referee: Boubou Traoré (Mali)
18 March 2023
20:00 UTC+1

JS Kabylie (Algeria)	1–0	(Angola) Petro de Luanda
Mouaki 90'	Report

Stade du 5 Juillet, Algiers
Referee: Dahane Beida (Mauritania)

1 April 2023
17:00 UTC+1

Petro de Luanda (Angola)	1–0	(Democratic Republic of the Congo) AS Vita Club
Jaredi 15'	Report

Estádio 11 de Novembro, Luanda
Referee: Messie Nkounkou (Congo)
1 April 2023
22:00 UTC+0

Wydad AC (Morocco)	3–0	(Algeria) JS Kabylie
Sambou 38', 51'; El Moutaraji 87'	Report

Stade Mohammed V, Casablanca
Referee: Abongile Tom (South Africa)

=== Group B ===
Pos	Team	Pld	W	D	L	GF	GA	GD	Pts	Qualification	MDS	ASC	HIL	CSG
1	(South Africa) Mamelodi Sundowns	6	4	2	0	14	7	+7	14	Advance to knockout stage	—	5–2	1–0	2–1
2	(Egypt) Al Ahly	6	3	1	2	14	8	+6	10 (Note: Head-to-head points: Al Ahly 3, Al Hilal 3. Head-to-head goal difference: Al Ahly +2, Al Hilal -2)	Advance to knockout stage	2–2	—	3–0	3–0
3	(Sudan) Al Hilal	6	3	1	2	6	6	0	10		1–1	1–0	—	2–0
4	(Cameroon) Coton Sport	6	0	0	6	3	16	−13	0		1–3	0–4	1–2	—

Source: CAF
Rules for classification: Group stage tiebreakers
Notes:
11 February 2023
15:00 UTC+2

Mamelodi Sundowns (South Africa)	1–0	(Sudan) Al Hilal
Mailula 25'	Report

Loftus Versfeld Stadium, Pretoria
Referee: Jean Jacques Ndala Ngambo (DR Congo)
4 March 2023 (Note: The Al Ahly v Coton Sport match, originally scheduled to be played on 10 or 11 February 2023, was rescheduled to 4 March 2023 due to Al Ahly's participation in the 2022 FIFA Club World Cup in Morocco between 1 and 11 February 2023.)
18:00 UTC+2

Al Ahly (Egypt)	3–0	(Cameroon) Coton Sport
Sherif 1'; Kendouci 40'; Khalil 90+2'	Report

Al Ahly WE Al Salam Stadium, Cairo
Referee: Ahmad Imtehaz Heeralall (Mauritius)

17 February 2023
17:00 UTC+1

Coton Sport (Cameroon)	1–3	(South Africa) Mamelodi Sundowns
Wassou 30'	Report	Mailula 10', 43'; Mudau 11'

Roumdé Adjia Stadium, Garoua
Referee: Samuel Uwikunda (Rwanda)
18 February 2023
15:00 UTC+2

Al Hilal (Sudan)	1–0	(Egypt) Al Ahly
Lilepo 53'	Report

Al Hilal Stadium, Omdurman
Referee: Dahane Beida (Mauritania)

24 February 2023
17:00 UTC+1

Coton Sport (Cameroon)	1–2	(Sudan) Al Hilal
Wassou 43'	Report	Lilepo 52', 57'

Roumdé Adjia Stadium, Garoua
Referee: Mehrez Melki (Tunisia)
25 February 2023
21:00 UTC+2

Al Ahly (Egypt)	2–2	(South Africa) Mamelodi Sundowns
Abdelmonem 59'; El Shahat 74'	Report	Shalulile 34'; Morena 80'

Al Ahly WE Al Salam Stadium, Cairo
Referee: Bamlak Tessema Weyesa (Ethiopia)

7 March 2023
15:00 UTC+2

Al Hilal (Sudan)	2–0	(Cameroon) Coton Sport
Abagna 41'; Lilepo 83' (pen.)	Report

Al Hilal Stadium, Omdurman
Referee: Redouane Jiyed (Morocco)
11 March 2023
15:00 UTC+2

Mamelodi Sundowns (South Africa)	5–2	(Egypt) Al Ahly
Allende 4'; Zwane 24'; Mokoena 40'; Shalulile 72', 88'	Report	Sherif 13'; Tau 61'

Loftus Versfeld Stadium, Pretoria
Referee: Issa Sy (Senegal)

17 March 2023
17:00 UTC+1

Coton Sport (Cameroon)	0–4	(Egypt) Al Ahly
	Report	Kahraba 23', 29', 51'; Tau 54'

Roumdé Adjia Stadium, Garoua
Referee: Peter Waweru (Kenya)
18 March 2023
15:00 UTC+2

Al Hilal (Sudan)	1–1	(South Africa) Mamelodi Sundowns
Abdelrahman 72'	Report	Mudau 67'

Al Hilal Stadium, Omdurman
Referee: Sadok Selmi (Tunisia)

1 April 2023
21:00 UTC+2

Al Ahly (Egypt)	3–0	(Sudan) Al Hilal
Kahraba 25'; El Shahat 64', 81'	Report

Cairo International Stadium, Cairo
Referee: Abdel Aziz Mohamed Bouh (Mauritania)
1 April 2023
21:00 UTC+2

Mamelodi Sundowns (South Africa)	2–1	(Cameroon) Coton Sport
Mekong 43' (o.g.); Nassir 86'	Report	Kasali 90+5'

Loftus Versfeld Stadium, Pretoria
Referee: Celso Armindo Alvação (Mozambique)

=== Group C ===
Pos	Team	Pld	W	D	L	GF	GA	GD	Pts	Qualification	RCA	SSC	HAC	VSC
1	(Morocco) Raja CA	6	5	1	0	17	3	+14	16	Advance to knockout stage	—	3–1	2–0	5–0
2	(Tanzania) Simba	6	3	0	3	10	7	+3	9	Advance to knockout stage	0–3	—	7–0	1–0
3	(Guinea) Horoya	6	2	1	3	4	12	−8	7		1–3	1–0	—	2–0
4	(Uganda) Vipers	6	0	2	4	1	10	−9	2		1–1	0–1	0–0	—

Source: CAF
Rules for classification: Group stage tiebreakers
10 February 2023
20:00 UTC+1

Raja CA (Morocco)	5–0	(Uganda) Vipers
Khabba 5'; Harkass 11'; Zrida 38'; Bouzok 59'; Aholou 71'	Report

Stade Mohammed V, Casablanca
Referee: Boubou Traoré (Mali)
11 February 2023
16:00 UTC+0

Horoya (Guinea)	1–0	(Tanzania) Simba
P. A. N'Diaye 18'	Report

General Lansana Conté Stadium, Conakry
Referee: Amin Omar (Egypt)

18 February 2023
16:00 UTC+3

Vipers (Uganda)	0–0	(Guinea) Horoya
	Report

St. Mary's Stadium-Kitende, Entebbe
Referee: Lahlou Benbraham (Algeria)
18 February 2023
19:00 UTC+3

Simba (Tanzania)	0–3	(Morocco) Raja CA
	Report	Khabba 30'; Benjdida 82'; Mokadem 86' (pen.)

National Stadium, Dar es Salaam
Referee: Blaise Yuven Ngwa (Cameroon)

25 February 2023
19:00 UTC+3

Vipers (Uganda)	0–1	(Tanzania) Simba
	Report	Baka 20'

St. Mary's Stadium-Kitende, Entebbe
Referee: Celso Armindo Alvação (Mozambique)
25 February 2023
20:00 UTC+1

Raja CA (Morocco)	2–0	(Guinea) Horoya
Khabba 43'; Zerhouni 89'	Report

Stade Mohammed V, Casablanca
Referee: Peter Waweru (Kenya)

7 March 2023
19:00 UTC+3

Simba (Tanzania)	1–0	(Uganda) Vipers
Chama 45+1'	Report

National Stadium, Dar es Salaam
Referee: Bamlak Tessema Weyesa (Ethiopia)
7 March 2023
16:00 UTC+0

Horoya (Guinea)	1–3	(Morocco) Raja CA
P. A. N'Diaye 70'	Report	Sabbar 6', 63'; Nahiri 42'

Stade du 26 Mars, Bamako (Mali)
Referee: Ibrahim Kalilou Traore (Ivory Coast)

18 March 2023
19:00 UTC+3

Vipers (Uganda)	1–1	(Morocco) Raja CA
Lawal 45+3'	Report	Benjdida 18'

St. Mary's Stadium-Kitende, Entebbe
Referee: Mohamed Athoumani (Comoros)
18 March 2023
19:00 UTC+3

Simba (Tanzania)	7–0	(Guinea) Horoya
Chama 10', 36' (pen.), 70'; Othos 32', 65'; Kanouté 54', 87'	Report

National Stadium, Dar es Salaam
Referee: Mohamed Adel (Egypt)

31 March 2023
16:00 UTC+0

Horoya (Guinea)	2–0	(Uganda) Vipers
Barry 11'; Traoré 90+3'	Report

Stade du 26 Mars, Bamako (Mali)
Referee: Jean Ouattara (Burkina Faso)
31 March 2023
22:00 UTC+0

Raja CA (Morocco)	3–1	(Tanzania) Simba
Khabba 44', 70' (pen.); Boulacsoute 86'	Report	Othos 48'

Stade Mohammed V, Casablanca
Referee: Ahmad Imtehaz Heeralall (Mauritius)

=== Group D ===
Pos	Team	Pld	W	D	L	GF	GA	GD	Pts	Qualification	EST	CRB	ZSC	MSC
1	(Tunisia) Espérance de Tunis	6	3	2	1	6	4	+2	11	Advance to knockout stage	—	0–0	2–0	1–0
2	(Algeria) CR Belouizdad	6	3	1	2	4	2	+2	10	Advance to knockout stage	0–1	—	2–0	1–0
3	(Egypt) Zamalek	6	2	1	3	7	9	−2	7		3–1	0–1	—	4–3
4	(Sudan) Al Merrikh	6	1	2	3	5	7	−2	5		1–1	1–0	0–0	—

Source: CAF
Rules for classification: Group stage tiebreakers
10 February 2023
18:00 UTC+2

Zamalek (Egypt)	0–1	(Algeria) CR Belouizdad
	Report	Wamba 57' (pen.)

Cairo International Stadium, Cairo
Referee: Issa Sy (Senegal)
11 February 2023
17:00 UTC+1

Espérance de Tunis (Tunisia)	1–0	(Sudan) Al Merrikh
Tougai 90+4'	Report

Stade Hammadi Agrebi, Tunis
Referee: Ibrahim Kalilou Traore (Ivory Coast)

17 February 2023
15:00 UTC+2

Al Merrikh (Sudan)	0–0	(Egypt) Zamalek
	Report

Benina Martyrs Stadium, Benghazi (Libya) (Note: Al Merrikh played their group stage home matches at Benina Martyrs Stadium, Benghazi (Libya), instead of their regular home stadium Al Merrikh Stadium, Omdurman, which did not meet CAF requirements.)
Referee: Daniel Nii Laryea (Ghana)
18 February 2023
20:00 UTC+1

CR Belouizdad (Algeria)	0–1	(Tunisia) Espérance de Tunis
	Report	Elhouni 80'

Stade du 5 Juillet, Algiers
Referee: Abongile Tom (South Africa)

24 February 2023
15:00 UTC+2

Al Merrikh (Sudan)	1–0	(Algeria) CR Belouizdad
Sérgio 32' (pen.)	Report

Benina Martyrs Stadium, Benghazi (Libya)
Referee: Boubou Traoré (Mali)
25 February 2023
17:00 UTC+1

Espérance de Tunis (Tunisia)	2–0	(Egypt) Zamalek
Ben Hammouda 35'; Ben Romdhane 90+2'	Report

Stade Hammadi Agrebi, Tunis
Referee: Redouane Jiyed (Morocco)

7 March 2023
20:00 UTC+1

CR Belouizdad (Algeria)	1–0	(Sudan) Al Merrikh
Belkhir 35'	Report

19 May 1956 Stadium, Annaba (Note: The CR Belouizdad v Al Merrikh match was played at 19 May 1956 Stadium, Annaba, instead of Stade du 5 Juillet, Algiers, due to the high intensity of matches in the same period at the stadium.)
Referee: Jean Jacques Ndala Ngambo (DR Congo)
7 March 2023
21:00 UTC+2

Zamalek (Egypt)	3–1	(Tunisia) Espérance de Tunis
Gaafar 9'; Zizo 29'; Jaziri 90+1'	Report	Benayad 57'

Borg El Arab Stadium, Alexandria
Referee: Blaise Yuven Ngwa (Cameroon)

17 March 2023
15:00 UTC+2

Al Merrikh (Sudan)	1–1	(Tunisia) Espérance de Tunis
Sérgio 90' (pen.)	Report	Ben Hammouda 23'

Benina Martyrs Stadium, Benghazi (Libya)
Referee: Ahmad Imtehaz Heeralall (Mauritius)
17 March 2023
20:00 UTC+1

CR Belouizdad (Algeria)	2–0	(Egypt) Zamalek
Draoui 75'; Wamba 79'	Report

Stade du 5 Juillet, Algiers
Referee: Mutaz Ibrahim (Libya)

31 March 2023
21:00 UTC+2

Zamalek (Egypt)	4–3	(Sudan) Al Merrikh
Shalaby 1'; Mansi 3', 64', 90+4'	Report	Agab 7'; Nouh 48'; Sérgio 56'

Cairo International Stadium, Cairo
Referee: Samuel Uwikunda (Rwanda)
1 April 2023
23:00 UTC+1

Espérance de Tunis (Tunisia)	0–0	(Algeria) CR Belouizdad
	Report

Stade Hammadi Agrebi, Tunis
Referee: Pierre Atcho (Gabon)
