= 2022–23 CAF Champions League knockout stage =

- Dates: 21 April – 11 June 2023

Tournament statistics
- Matches played: 14
- Goals scored: 28 (2 per match)
- Attendance: 506,000 (36,143 per match)

The 2022–23 CAF Champions League knockout stage started on 21 April with the quarter-finals and ended on 11 June 2023 with the final to decide the champions of the 2022–23 CAF Champions League. A total of eight teams competed in the knockout stage.

Times were local.

== Round and draw dates ==
The schedule was as follows.

Round	Draw date	First leg	Second leg
Quarter-finals	5 April 2023	21–22 April 2023	28–29 April 2023
Semi-finals	5 April 2023	12–13 May 2023	19–20 May 2023
Final	5 April 2023	4 June 2023	11 June 2023

== Format ==
Each tie in the knockout phase was played over two legs, with each team playing one leg at home. The team that scored more goals on aggregate over the two legs advanced to the next round. If the aggregate score was level, the away goals rule was applied, i.e. the team that scored more goals away from home over the two legs advanced. If away goals were also equal, then extra time was not played and the winners were decided by a penalty shoot-out (Regulations III. 26 & 27). The mechanism of the draws for each round was as follows:

- In the draw for the quarter-finals, the four group winners were seeded, and the four group runners-up were unseeded. The seeded teams were drawn against the unseeded teams, with the seeded teams hosting the second leg. Teams from the same group cannot be drawn against each other, while teams from the same association can be drawn against each other.
- In the draws for the semi-finals and final, there were no seedings, and teams from the same group or the same association could be drawn against each other. As the draws for the quarter-finals and semi-finals were held together before the quarter-finals were played, the identity of the quarter-final winners was not known at the time of the semi-final draw.

== Qualified teams ==
The knockout stage involved the 8 teams which qualified as winners and runners-up of each of the eight groups in the group stage.

Group	Winners	Runners-up
A	(Royal Moroccan Football Federation) Wydad AC	(Algerian Football Federation) JS Kabylie
B	(South African Football Association) Mamelodi Sundowns	(Egyptian Football Association) Al Ahly
C	(Royal Moroccan Football Federation) Raja CA	(Tanzania Football Federation) Simba
D	(Tunisian Football Federation) Espérance de Tunis	(Algerian Football Federation) CR Belouizdad

== Bracket ==
The bracket of the knockout stage was determined as follows:

Round	Matchups
Quarter-finals	(Group winners hosted second leg, matchups decided by draw, teams from same group cannot play each other): QF1; QF2; QF3; QF4
Semi-finals	(Matchups and order of legs decided by draw, between winners QF1, QF2, QF3, QF4): SF1; SF2
Final	Winners SF1 and SF2 faced each other in two legs to decide the champions

The bracket was decided after the draw for the knockout stage, which was held on 5 April 2023.

Quarter-finals
(Algerian Football Federation) JS Kabylie	0	1	1
(Tunisian Football Federation) Espérance de Tunis	1	1	2
(Egyptian Football Association) Al Ahly	2	0	2
(Royal Moroccan Football Federation) Raja CA	0	0	0
(Tanzania Football Federation) Simba	1	0	1 (3)
(Royal Moroccan Football Federation) Wydad AC (p)	0	1	1 (4)
(Algerian Football Federation) CR Belouizdad	1	1	2
(South African Football Association) Mamelodi Sundowns	4	2	6

Semi-finals
(Tunisian Football Federation) Espérance de Tunis	0	0	0
(Egyptian Football Association) Al Ahly	3	1	4
(Royal Moroccan Football Federation) Wydad AC (a)	0	2	2
(South African Football Association) Mamelodi Sundowns	0	2	2

Final
(Egyptian Football Association) Al Ahly	2	1	3
(Royal Moroccan Football Federation) Wydad AC	1	1	2

== Quarter-finals ==
The draw for the quarter-finals was held on 5 April 2023.

=== Summary ===
The first legs were played on 21 and 22 April, and the second legs were played on 28 and 29 April 2023.

Team 1	Agg.	Team 2	1st leg	2nd leg
Simba (Tanzania)	1–1 (3–4 p)	(Morocco) Wydad AC	1–0	0–1
Al Ahly (Egypt)	2–0	(Morocco) Raja CA	2–0	0–0
CR Belouizdad (Algeria)	2–6	(South Africa) Mamelodi Sundowns	1–4	1–2
JS Kabylie (Algeria)	1–2	(Tunisia) Espérance de Tunis	0–1	1–1

=== Matches ===
22 April 2023
16:00 UTC+3

Simba (Tanzania Football Federation)	1–0	(Royal Moroccan Football Federation) Wydad AC
Othos 30'	Report

National Stadium, Dar es Salaam
Attendance: 70,000
Referee: Issa Sy (Senegal)
28 April 2023
20:00 UTC+1

Wydad AC (Royal Moroccan Football Federation)	1–0	(Tanzania Football Federation) Simba
Sambou 24'	Report
Penalties
Jabrane (penalty scored); El Amloud (penalty scored); Aboulfath (penalty scored); Haimoud (penalty scored)	4–3	(penalty scored) Nyoni; (penalty scored) Ntibazonkiza; (penalty missed) Kapombe; (penalty scored) Phiri; (penalty missed) Chama

Stade Mohammed V, Casablanca
Attendance: 39,000
Referee: Alhadi Allaou Mahamat (Chad)

1–1 on aggregate. Wydad AC won 4–3 on penalties.

22 April 2023
21:00 UTC+2

Al Ahly (Egyptian Football Association)	2–0	(Royal Moroccan Football Federation) Raja CA
Abdelmonem 45+2'; Fathy 84'	Report

Cairo International Stadium, Cairo
Attendance: 52,000
Referee: Mahmood Ismail (Sudan)
29 April 2023
20:00 UTC+1

Raja CA (Royal Moroccan Football Federation)	0–0	(Egyptian Football Association) Al Ahly
	Report

Stade Mohammed V, Casablanca
Attendance: 70,000
Referee: Mutaz Ibrahim (Libya)

Al Ahly won 2–0 on aggregate.

22 April 2023
20:00 UTC+1

CR Belouizdad (Algerian Football Federation)	1–4	(South African Football Association) Mamelodi Sundowns
Rebiaï 45+3'	Report	Shalulile 6', 51'; Maema 20'; Mailula 90+2'

Nelson Mandela Stadium, Algiers
Attendance: 40,000
Referee: Peter Waweru (Kenya)
29 April 2023
15:00 UTC+2

Mamelodi Sundowns (South African Football Association)	2–1	(Algerian Football Federation) CR Belouizdad
Zwane 45'; Morena 49'	Report	Bouchar 24'

Loftus Versfeld Stadium, Pretoria
Attendance: 10,000
Referee: Abdel Aziz Mohamed Bouh (Mauritania)

Mamelodi Sundowns won 6–2 on aggregate.

21 April 2023
22:00 UTC+1

JS Kabylie (Algerian Football Federation)	0–1	(Tunisian Football Federation) Espérance de Tunis
	Report	Ben Hammouda 54'

Stade du 5 Juillet, Algiers (Note: JS Kabylie played their knockout stage home matches at Stade du 5 Juillet, Algiers, instead of their regular home stadium 1 November 1954 Stadium, Tizi Ouzou, which did not meet CAF requirements.)
Attendance: 47,000
Referee: Amin Omar (Egypt)
29 April 2023
20:00 UTC+1

Espérance de Tunis (Tunisian Football Federation)	1–1	(Algerian Football Federation) JS Kabylie
Ben Romdhane 49'	Report	Redjem 85'

Stade Hammadi Agrebi, Tunis
Attendance: 40,000
Referee: Jean Jacques Ndala Ngambo (DR Congo)

Espérance de Tunis won 2–1 on aggregate.

== Semi-finals ==
The draw for the semi-finals was held on 5 April 2023 (after the quarter-finals draw).

=== Summary ===
The first legs were played on 12 and 13 May, and the second legs were played on 19 and 20 May 2023.

Team 1	Agg.	Team 2	1st leg	2nd leg
Espérance de Tunis (Tunisia)	0–4	(Egypt) Al Ahly	0–3	0–1
Wydad AC (Morocco)	2–2 (a)	(South Africa) Mamelodi Sundowns	0–0	2–2

=== Matches ===
12 May 2023
20:00 UTC+1

Espérance de Tunis (Tunisian Football Federation)	0–3	(Egyptian Football Association) Al Ahly
	Report	Tau 8', 55'; Kahraba 75'

Stade Hammadi Agrebi, Tunis
Attendance: 0 (close doors)
Referee: Peter Waweru (Kenya)
19 May 2023
22:00 UTC+3

Al Ahly (Egyptian Football Association)	1–0	(Tunisian Football Federation) Espérance de Tunis
El Shahat 22'	Report

Cairo International Stadium, Cairo
Attendance: 10,000
Referee: Dahane Beida (Mauritania)

Al Ahly won 4–0 on aggregate.

13 May 2023
20:00 UTC+1

Wydad AC (Royal Moroccan Football Federation)	0–0	(South African Football Association) Mamelodi Sundowns
	Report

Stade Mohammed V, Casablanca
Attendance: 39,000
Referee: Daniel Nii Laryea (Ghana)
20 May 2023
15:00 UTC+2

Mamelodi Sundowns (South African Football Association)	2–2	(Royal Moroccan Football Federation) Wydad AC
Zwane 50'; Shalulile 79'	Report	El Amloud 72'; Mvala 83' (o.g.)

Loftus Versfeld Stadium, Pretoria
Attendance: 50,000
Referee: Mahmood Ismail (Sudan)

2–2 on aggregate. Wydad AC won on away goals.

== Final ==
The first leg was played on 4 June, and the second leg was played on 11 June 2023.

Team 1	Agg.	Team 2	1st leg	2nd leg
Al Ahly (Egypt)	3–2	(Morocco) Wydad AC	2–1	1–1

4 June 2023
21:00 UTC+3

Al Ahly (Egypt)	2–1	(Morocco) Wydad AC
Tau 45+4'; Kahraba 59'	Report	Bouhra 86'

Cairo International Stadium, Cairo
Attendance: 50,000
Referee: Mutaz Ibrahim (Libya)
11 June 2023
20:00 UTC+1

Wydad AC (Morocco)	1–1	(Egypt) Al Ahly
Attiyat Allah 27'	Report	Abdelmonem 78'

Stade Mohammed V, Casablanca
Attendance: 45,000
Referee: Bamlak Tessema Weyesa (Ethiopia)

Al Ahly won 3–2 on aggregate.
