= Oscar Kabwit =

Congolese footballer (born 2005)

Personal information
- Full name: Oscar Kabwit Tshikomb
- Date of birth: 5 May 2005 (age 21)
- Place of birth: Lubumbashi, DR Congo
- Height: 1.80 m (5 ft 11 in)
- Positions: Winger; forward

Team information
- Current team: Luzern
- Number: 16

Youth career
- –2022: Katumbi Football Academy

Senior career*
Years	Team	Apps	(Gls)
2022–2023	Don Bosco		
2023–2026	TP Mazembe		
2025–2026	→ Luzern (loan)	27	(11)
2026–	Luzern	7	(2)

International career^{‡}
2024–	DR Congo	7	(0)
- * Club domestic league appearances and goals as of 28 September 2026 ‡ National team caps and goals as of 17 August 2025

Oscar Kabwit (born 5 May 2005) is a Congolese professional footballer who plays as a winger for Swiss Super League club Luzern, and the DR Congo national team.

== Club career ==
Born in Lubumbashi, Kabwit developed at the Katumbi Football Academy and moved to CS Don Bosco before joining TP Mazembe in 2023.

He drew wider attention during the 2023–24 CAF Champions League quarter-final first leg on 6 April 2024 in Luanda, when Mazembe beat Petro de Luanda 2–1; Kabwit’s direct dribbling on the left wing was highlighted by club and local media coverage of the tie.

On 8 September 2025, Kabwit joined Luzern in Switzerland on loan with an option to buy. He was heavily praised for his critical role in a 4–2 victory against defending champions Basel on 22 February 2026, during which he scored two goals and one assist.

== International career ==
Kabwit was called up to DR Congo youth squads in 2024 and was listed for two U20 friendlies against Morocco in May 2024. In November 2024, national-team coach Sébastien Desabre included Kabwit in a senior squad for international fixtures, a move widely viewed as a message of confidence in domestic-league talent. He made his national team debut on 19 November 2024 in the AFCON qualifier against Ethiopia.

== Style of play ==
Primarily a left-sided winger who can operate across the front line, Kabwit is noted for ball-carrying, acceleration and one-v-one dribbling.

== Honours ==
TP Mazembe

- Linafoot: 2023–24 (champions).
