= Amine Souane =

Moroccan footballer

Personal information
- Date of birth: 17 September 2001 (age 25)
- Place of birth: Oujda, Morocco
- Height: 1.82 m (6 ft 0 in)
- Position: Defensive midfielder

Team information
- Current team: MC Oujda
- Number: 14

Youth career
- –2021: MC Oujda

Senior career*
Years	Team	Apps	(Gls)
2021–	MC Oujda	39	(2)

International career^{‡}
2022	Morocco Olympic	1	(0)
2025–	Morocco A'	0	(0)
- * Club domestic league appearances and goals as of 18 July 2023 ‡ National team caps and goals as of 18 July 2023

Amine Souane (Arabic: أمين سوان; born 17 September 2001) is a Moroccan professional footballer who plays the role of a defensive midfielder for MC Oujda and the Morocco A' national team.

== Club career ==
Souane joined the youth academy of MC Oujda at an early age.

He made his senior debut on 3 June 2021 in the Botola Pro during the derby against RS Berkane, coming on as a substitute in the 77th minute for Nabil Jaadi in a 3–1 defeat. On 21 November 2021, he made his first start in a 1–1 draw against Difaâ Hassani El Jadidi.

In the 2022–23 season, Souane scored his first professional goal on 20 January 2023 against Union Touarga Sport from an assist by Yanis Merah in a 2–2 draw.

== International career ==
In October 2021, Souane received his first call-up to the Morocco Olympic for a training camp at the Maâmora Sports Centre in Salé from 4 to 12 October, under coach Hicham Dmii.

He returned to the Olympic squad in July 2022 for the Islamic Solidarity Games held in Konya, Turkey. Morocco were placed in Group B alongside Iran, Saudi Arabia, and Azerbaijan. Morocco's first match was awarded as a 3–0 win by default after Iran withdrew from the competition. They were later eliminated in the group stage after a 2–0 defeat to Saudi Arabia and a 2–2 draw against Azerbaijan.

== Honours ==
Morocco

- African Nations Championship: 2024
