= Nabil Jaadi =

Belgian-born Moroccan footballer

Personal information
- Date of birth: 1 July 1996 (age 30)
- Place of birth: Brussels, Belgium
- Height: 1.78 m (5 ft 10 in)
- Position: Winger

Team information
- Current team: IR Tanger
- Number: 7

Youth career
- –2013: Anderlecht

Senior career*
Years	Team	Apps	(Gls)
2013–2014	Anderlecht	0	(0)
2014–2018	Udinese	0	(0)
2015	→ Latina (loan)	5	(0)
2015–2016	→ Granada B (loan)	27	(1)
2016–2017	→ Ascoli (loan)	9	(0)
2017	→ Olhanense (loan)	8	(0)
2018	→ Asteras Tripolis (loan)	1	(0)
2019	Dinamo București	8	(0)
2019	Raja Beni Mellal	9	(3)
2020–2022	Mouloudia Oujda	44	(3)
2022–2023	Helal Matruh		
2023–	IR Tanger	6	(0)

International career
2010–2011	Belgium U15	6	(1)
2012	Belgium U16	7	(1)
2013	Morocco U17	9	(2)
2014	Morocco U20	2	(1)
2014	Morocco U23	3	(1)
- * Club domestic league appearances and goals as of 18 January 2024

Nabil Jaadi (Arabic: نبيل الجعدي; born 1 July 1996) is a Belgium-born Moroccan footballer who plays as a winger.

== Career ==
On 30 January 2018, Jaadi will continue his career at the Super League One club Asteras Tripolis on loan until the summer of 2018. The 21-year-old Belgian-Moroccan international has also been a member of Anderlecht, Latina, Granada B, Ascoli and Olhanense in the past, while he will replace Ivorian striker Cedric Gondo in the current squad of experienced manager Savvas Pantelidis' team.

On 21 February 2019, he joined Romanian side Dinamo București. He left Dinamo in August 2019.

== Personal life ==
Jaadi was born in Belgium and is of Moroccan descent. Nabil is the brother of the Belgian footballer Reda Jaadi. He has also represented the Belgian and Moroccan national youth teams.
