= Ali Reghba =

Professional footballer (born 2000)

Personal information
- Date of birth: 14 January 2000 (age 26)
- Place of birth: Essen, Germany
- Height: 1.83 m (6 ft 0 in)
- Positions: Winger; forward

Team information
- Current team: Maribor
- Number: 11

Youth career
- Home Farm
- Shelbourne
- 2018: Bohemians
- 2019–2022: Leicester City

Senior career*
Years	Team	Apps	(Gls)
2018–2019	Bohemians	12	(2)
2022–2023	Belouizdad	22	(1)
2024–2025	Rabotnichki	27	(7)
2025–	Maribor	41	(4)

International career
2018–2019	Republic of Ireland U19	11	(1)
- * Club domestic league appearances and goals as of 7 November 2026

Ali Reghba (Arabic: علي رغبة; born 14 January 2000) is a professional footballer who plays as a winger for Slovenian PrvaLiga club Maribor. Born in Germany, he has played youth football for the Republic of Ireland national team.

== Club career ==
Born in Essen, Germany, Reghba moved to Coolock, Dublin with his family when he was six years old. There, he made his senior debut with Bohemians at the age of 18.

In 2019, Reghba signed for the reserves of English Premier League side Leicester City. Before the second half of 2021–22, he signed for CR Belouizdad in Algeria. On 7 March 2022, he debuted for the club during a 2–0 win over PAC.

On 3 February 2025, Reghba joined Slovenian PrvaLiga outfit Maribor on a contract until summer 2027.

== International career ==
Reghba was born in Germany to an Algerian father and Irish mother. He is eligible to represent Germany through birth, and Algeria through his father.

He was part of the Republic of Ireland under-19 team between 2018 and 2019, and made eleven appearances for the team.

== Honours ==
Belouizdad

- Algerian Ligue Professionnelle 1: 2021–22, 2022–23
