= Leonel Wamba =

Cameroonian footballer

Personal information
- Full name: Leonel Wamba
- Date of birth: 1 September 2002 (age 24)
- Place of birth: Foréké Dschang, Cameroon
- Height: 1.85 m (6 ft 1 in)
- Position: Striker

Team information
- Current team: Baniyas (on loan from Al Wahda)
- Number: 42

Senior career*
Years	Team	Apps	(Gls)
2021	Spartaks Jūrmala	25	(14)
2022–2024	CR Belouizdad	54	(17)
2024–	Al Wahda	14	(0)
2025–	→ Baniyas (loan)	2	(0)

International career^{‡}
2019	Cameroon U17	8	(1)
- * Club domestic league appearances and goals as of 22 September 2024 ‡ National team caps and goals as of 4 March 2022

Leonel Wamba (born 1 September 2002) is a Cameroonian footballer who plays as a striker for Baniyas, on loan from Al Wahda.

== Club career ==
On July 22, 2022, Lionel Wamba signed a three-year contract with the Algerian champions CR Belouizdad on the recommendation of Nabil Kouki. Wamba said that he is happy to join CRB and that it is a great club. He said he received offers but preferred CR Belouizdad because they sold him an interesting project. He is here to bring something more to the team. He knows there is a lot of competition, but for him. He will fight as he should, whether in the Ligue 1 or Champions League because it will be the first time for him because Wamba has never played in an African tournament. On October 2, 2022, Lionel Wamba scored his first goal in the colors of CR Belouizdad against JS Saoura in a 1–0 win. On October 2, 2023, Wamba scored the first hat-trick in his football career in the second round of the Champions League against Bo Rangers to qualify his team to the group stage.

== Career statistics ==
=== Club ===
As of 22 September 2024

Club	Season	League			Cup		Continental		Other		Total	
Club	Season	Division	Apps	Goals	Apps	Goals	Apps	Goals	Apps	Goals	Apps	Goals
Spartaks Jūrmala	2021	Optibet Virslīga	25	14	1	0	—		—		26	14
CR Belouizdad	2022–23	Ligue 1	25	7	6	2	11 (Note: All appearance(s) in Champions League)	2	—		42	11
CR Belouizdad	2023–24	Ligue 1	29	10	0	0	7	4	3 (Note: All appearance(s) in Arab Club Champions Cup)	0	39	14
Total			54	17	6	2	18	3	3	0	81	22
Career total			79	31	7	2	18	3	3	0	107	36

== Honours ==
CR Belouizdad

- Algerian Ligue Professionnelle 1: 2022–23

Cameroon U17

- U-17 Africa Cup of Nations: 2019
