= Ecofoot Katumbi =

Football club in the Democratic Republic of the Congo

TP Mazembe Academy Académie TP Mazembe
- Full name: Katumbi Football Academy
- Founded: 2010
- Ground: TP Mazembe Stadium
- Capacity: 18,500
- Manager: Richard Mubemb
- League: Lubumbashi Urban Football League (EUFLU)
- Website: www.tpmazembe.com
Home colours	Away colours	Third colours

The Katumbi Football Academy (French: Académie de football Katumbi) is the reserve team of TP Mazembe, created in 2010. The team plays at the TP Mazembe Stadium, a stadium with a capacity of 18,500 located in Lubumbashi, which is also the home of TP Mazembe.

== Honors ==
- Coupe de RD Congo
  - Finalist: 2015

== Notable personnel ==
=== Former players ===
- Glody Likonza
- Christ Kisangala
- Mechack Tshimanga
- Patient Mwamba
- Arsène Zola

== See also ==
- TP Mazembe
