= Reda Jaadi =

Belgian footballer (born 1995)

Personal information
- Full name: Reda Jaadi
- Date of birth: 14 February 1995 (age 31)
- Place of birth: Brussels, Belgium
- Height: 1.86 m (6 ft 1 in)
- Position: Midfielder

Team information
- Current team: Wydad AC
- Number: 8

Senior career*
| Years | Team | Apps | (Gls) |
| 2012–2015 | Standard Liège | 0 | (0) |
| 2012–2013 | → Dessel Sport (loan) | 17 | (1) |
| 2013–2014 | → Visé (loan) | 8 | (0) |
| 2016–2017 | KV Mechelen | 6 | (1) |
| 2017–2019 | Royal Antwerp | 21 | (2) |
| 2019 | Dinamo București | 14 | (1) |
| 2019–2021 | FUS Rabat | 43 | (4) |
| 2021–2023 | Wydad AC | 43 | (3) |
| 2023–2024 | IR Tanger | 12 | (0) |
| 2024– | Wydad AC | 0 | (0) |

International career^{‡}
| 2011 | Belgium U17 | 2 | (0) |
| 2021– | Morocco A' | 1 | (0) |
Medal record
Men's football
Representing Morocco
African Nations Championship
| Winner | 2020 Cameroon |
- * Club domestic league appearances and goals as of 9 September 2022 ‡ National team caps and goals as of 9 February 2021

Reda Jaadi (born 14 February 1995) is a Belgium-born Moroccan footballer who plays as a midfielder for the Moroccan club IR Tanger.

== International career ==
Reda Jaadi played two games for Belgium U17 at the 2012 European Under-17 Championship qualifiers.

Jaadi eventually switched allegiance and played one game for Morocco, appearing in a 5–2 victory against Uganda at the 2020 African Nations Championship, a tournament which was eventually won by Morocco.

== Personal life ==
Jaadi was born in Brussels, Belgium on 14 February 1995 and is Moroccan by descent. Reda is the brother of the Moroccan youth international, Nabil Jaadi.

== Honours ==
=== Club ===
Wydad AC

- Botola Pro: 2021–22
- CAF Champions League: 2021–22

=== International ===
Morocco

- African Nations Championship: 2020
