= Arsène Zola =

Congolese footballer

Personal information
- Full name: Arsène Zola Kiaku
- Date of birth: 23 February 1996 (age 30)
- Place of birth: Lubumbashi, Zaire
- Height: 1.82 m (6 ft 0 in)
- Position: Left back

Team information
- Current team: Kuwait SC
- Number: 35

Senior career*
Years	Team	Apps	(Gls)
2015–2016	Ecofoot Katumbi		
2016–2021	TP Mazembe		
2021–2022	Chabab Mohammédia	13	(0)
2022–2024	Wydad AC		
2024	→ Kuwait SC (loan)		
2024–	Kuwait SC		

International career^{‡}
- DR Congo U23
2021–	DR Congo	2	(0)
- * Club domestic league appearances and goals ‡ National team caps and goals as of 08:24, 7 April 2023 (UTC)

Arsène Zola Kiaku (born 23 February 1996) is a Congolese professional footballer who plays for Kuwait SC as a left back.

== Club career ==
Born in Lubumbashi, Zola began his career with Ecofoot Katumbi.

After playing for TP Mazembe, in July 2019 it was announced that he would move to Belgian club Anderlecht, alongside teammate Meschak Elia. By August 2019 both players were noticed to be missing from Anderlecht's training camp, and it was later revealed that both players had failed to complete their transfers to Anderlecht and were looking for different clubs.

He later played in Morocco for Chabab Mohammédia and Wydad AC, and in Kuwait for Kuwait SC.

== International career ==
In May 2018, he was called up to the Democratic Congo national team for a friendly with Nigeria, and was named to the matchday line-up as an unused substitute.

Zola represented the DR Congo at under-23 level. The country was disqualified from the U-23 Africa Cup of Nations qualifiers in April 2019 after it was revealed that Zola was ineligible to play as he was too old, with the country changing his birthdate from 1996 to 1997.

He made his debut for DR Congo national football team on 29 March 2021 in an AFCON 2021 qualifier against Gambia.

== Honours ==
- Botola Team of the Season: 2022–23
