= Saifeddine Bouhra =

French professional footballer

Personal information
- Full name: Saifeddine Bouhra
- Date of birth: 5 March 2000 (age 26)
- Place of birth: Saïdia, Morocco
- Height: 1.73 m (5 ft 8 in)
- Position: Midfielder

Team information
- Current team: Wydad AC (on loan from SCC Mohammédia)
- Number: 30

Youth career
- –2018: Mohammed VI Football Academy

Senior career*
Years	Team	Apps	(Gls)
2019–2020	Rapide Oued Zem	28	(3)
2020–	SCC Mohammédia	21	(1)
2021–2022	→ MAS Fès (loan)	29	(2)
2022–2023	→ Wydad AC (loan)	30	(4)
2023	Wydad AC	0	(0)
- * Club domestic league appearances and goals

Saifeddine Bouhra (Arabic: سيف الدين بوهرة; born 5 March 2000) is a Moroccan professional footballer who plays as a midfielder.

== Club career ==
He is from the Moroccan Football Academy where Youssef En-Nesyri was training before transferring to Seville FC.

== International career ==
On July 28, 2022, he was summoned by coach Hicham Dmii for a training camp with the Morocco A' team, appearing on a list of 23 players who will take part in the Islamic Solidarity Games in August 2022.

== Honours ==
Morocco

- African Nations Championship: 2024
