= Peter Waweru =

Kenyan soccer referee

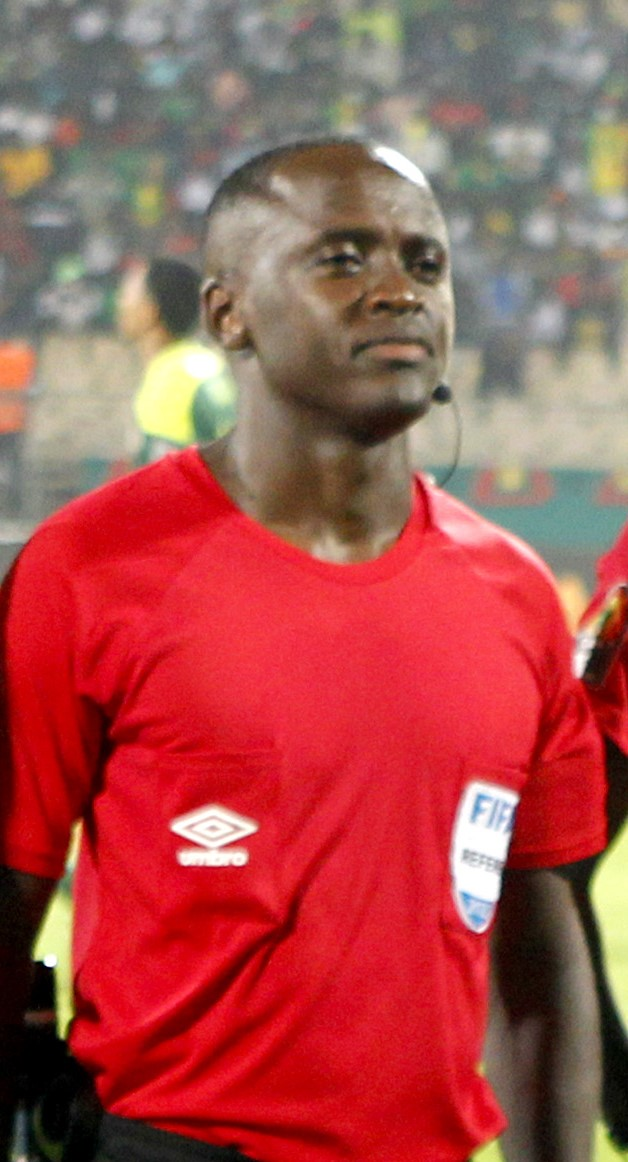
- Full name: Peter Waweru Kamaku
- Born: May 27, 1982 (age 44); Nairobi, Kenya
- Other occupation: Lecturer, Academic administrator, Mathematics researcher

Domestic
| Years | League | Role |
| 2009– | Kenyan Premier League | Referee |

International
| Years | League | Role |
| 2017– | FIFA Listed | Referee |

Peter Waweru Kamaku (born 27 May 1982) is a Kenyan football referee, academic administrator and researcher. He has been a referee in Kenyan Premier League since 2013 and a FIFA listed referee since 2017. He is also a professor of pure mathematics at Jomo Kenyatta University of Agriculture and Technology in Kenya.

== Early life and education ==
Waweru was born in Nairobi, Kenya. He attended Gatheri Primary School and Alliance High School. He graduated with a Bachelor of Science in mathematics & computer science in (2006) and a Master of Science in pure mathematics (2008) both from Jomo Kenyatta University of Agriculture and Technology. He attained a Ph.D. in pure mathematics in 2013 from Jomo Kenyatta University of Agriculture and Technology. In 2015, Waweru earned a postgraduate diploma in education technology from University of Cape Town.

== Career ==
=== Referee works ===
Waweru started to officiate football in the lower leagues of Kenya in 2011. In 2013, he joined Kenyan Premier League and in 2017 he was listed as a FIFA referee. He has officiated in various FIFA tournaments such as AFCON U20 in 2019, AFCON 2019 in Egypt, 2019 U17 World Cup in Brazil, 2021 CHAN where he officiated the 2021 CHAN finals. Since 2017, Waweru has officiated several CAF Champions League games, Confederation Cup matches and FIFA World Cup qualifying matches. Waweru was chosen as one of the referees for the 2021 Africa Cup of Nations held in Cameroon from 9 January to 6 February 2022, and the 2023 Africa Cup of Nations held in Côte d'Ivoire from 13 January to 11 February 2024.

=== Lecturer ===
Waweru has served in different positions such as an Academic teaching assistant (2007-2009), as a Tutorial Follow (2009-2013), as a Lecturer (2013-2019) and since 2019 he serves as a senior lecturer at Jomo Kenyatta University of Agriculture and Technology. Waweru lectures Number theory, Coding theory and Algebra related courses.

== Other considerations ==
He is a member of the 20 pioneer group for CAF/FIFA Professional Referee 2020.

== Research reviews ==
He has published the finding of his research on Abstract Algebra, Coding and Number Theories in Mathematical books and other peer-related publication journals hence cited with an H-Index of 7 with 321 citations in over 120 peer-reviewed journals in Mathematical and Science publications.
