= Bouly Sambou =

Senegalese footballer (born 1998)

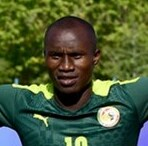

Personal information
- Full name: Bouly Junior Sambou
- Date of birth: 1 December 1998 (age 27)
- Place of birth: Bignona, Senegal
- Height: 1.83 m (6 ft 0 in)
- Position: Forward

Team information
- Current team: Al-Wehdat
- Number: 20

Senior career*
Years	Team	Apps	(Gls)
2018–2019	EJ Fatick	11	(5)
2019–2020	Teungueth	13	(7)
2020–2022	ASC Jaraaf	29	(17)
2022–2024	Wydad AC	38	(17)
2024–2025	Konyaspor	10	(0)
2024–2025	→ Gol Gohar (loan)	7	(0)
2025	→ Şanlıurfaspor (loan)	13	(3)
2025–2026	Duhok	14	(2)
2026	Al-Shorta	19	(3)
2026–	Al-Wehdat	0	(0)

International career^{‡}
2022–	Senegal	6	(1)
- * Club domestic league appearances and goals as of 10 August 2026 ‡ National team caps and goals as of 5 March 2024

Bouly Junior Sambou (born 1 December 1998) is a Senegalese professional footballer who plays as a forward for Jordanian club Al-Wehdat and the Senegal national team.

== Club career ==
On 4 February 2024, Sambou signed a 2.5-year contract with Konyaspor in Turkey.

== Honours ==
Wydad Casablanca

- CAF Champions League runner-up: 2022–23

=== Individual ===
- Botola Team of the Season: 2022–23

== International career ==
=== International goals ===
Scores and results list Senegal's goal tally first.

No.	Date	Venue	Opponent	Score	Result	Competition
1.	24 July 2022	SKD Stadium, Monrovia, Liberia	Liberia	1–0	3–0	2022 African Nations Championship qualification
