= 2023–24 Wydad AC season =

Wydad AC
2023–24 season
- President: Said Naciri (until 28 March 2024); Abdelmajid Bernaki (from 28 March 2024)
- Manager: Adil Ramzi (until 15 December 2023); Faouzi Benzarti (from 15 December 2023 to 13 March 2024); Aziz Ben Askar (from 15 April)
- Stadium: Stade Mohammed V (until 5 November 2023); Marrakesh Stadium (from 25 November 2023 until 2 March 2024) (Note: Only CAF Champions League group stage matches.); El Bachir Stadium (from 6 December 2023) (Note: Only domestic (Botola & Throne Cup) matches.)
- Botola: 6th
- Throne Cup: Round of 32
- Champions League: Group stage
- African Football League: Runners-up
- Arab Club Champions Cup: Group stage
- Top goalscorer: League: Ade Oguns (5 goals); All: Ayoub El Amloud (6 goals)
- Biggest win: 3–0; Hafia FC (H); 3–0; Ittihad Tanger (A); 3–0; Enyimba (H); 5–2; SCC Mohammédia (H)
- Biggest defeat: 0–2; Fath Union Sport (H); 0–2; Mamelodi Sundowns (A); 1–3; AS FAR (A); 0–2; Simba (A); 0–2; Raja CA (H); 1–3; JS Soualem (A); 0–2; IR Tanger (H)
Home colours	Away colours	Third colours

The 2023–24 season was Wydad Athletic Club's 84th season in existence and the club's 68th consecutive season in the top flight of Moroccan football. Wydad participated in this season's edition of the Botola, the Throne Cup, the Champions League, the African Football League and the Arab Club Champions Cup.

== Players ==
Note: Flags indicate national team as defined under FIFA eligibility rules; some limited exceptions apply. Players may hold more than one non-FIFA nationality.

No.	Pos.	Nation	Player
1	GK	MAR	Mehdi Maftah
2	MF	MAR	Oussama Mahrous
3	MF	MAR	Anas Serrhat
4	DF	MAR	Amine Aboulfath
5	MF	MAR	Yahya Jabrane (captain)
7	FW	MAR	Ismail El Haddad
8	DF	MAR	Badr Gaddarine
9	FW	MTN	Sidi Bouna Amar
10	FW	LBA	Hamdou Elhouni
11	FW	MAR	Mohamed Ounajem
12	GK	MAR	Taha Mourid
13	MF	MAR	Abdellah Haimoud
16	DF	MAR	Jamal Harkass
17	MF	ALG	Zakaria Draoui

No.	Pos.	Nation	Player
18	FW	NGR	Ade Oguns
19	FW	MAR	Montasser Lahtimi (on loan from Trabzonspor)
20	DF	ALG	Ilyes Chetti
21	FW	MAR	Charki El Bahri
22	DF	MAR	Ayoub El Amloud
25	DF	MAR	Amine Farhane
26	DF	MAR	Hicham Ait Brayem
27	FW	SEN	Bouly Sambou
29	FW	MAR	Imad Khannouss
30	FW	MAR	Saifeddine Bouhra
32	GK	MAR	Youssef El Motie
34	FW	MAR	Salaheddine Benyachou
35	DF	COD	Arsène Zola
40	GK	FRA	Boubacar Bah

=== Out on loan ===
Note: Flags indicate national team as defined under FIFA eligibility rules; some limited exceptions apply. Players may hold more than one non-FIFA nationality.

No.	Pos.	Nation	Player
8	MF	MAR	Ismail Moutaraji (at Al Dhafra FC until 30 June 2024)

== Transfers ==
=== In ===
Date	Position	Nationality	Name	From	Fee	Ref.
27 June 2023	MF	(Morocco)	Karim Ait Mohamed	–	Free transfer	
21 July 2023	DF	(Algeria)	Ilyes Chetti	–	Free transfer	
21 July 2023	MF	(Morocco)	Oussama Mahrous	–	Free transfer	
21 July 2023	MF	(Algeria)	Zakaria Draoui	–	Free transfer	
21 July 2023	GK	(Morocco)	Mehdi Maftah	–	Free transfer	
24 July 2023	DF	(Morocco)	Hamza Regragui	–	Free transfer	
24 July 2023	FW	(Morocco)	Charki El Bahri	–	Free transfer	
29 July 2023	FW	(Morocco)	Saifeddine Bouhra	SCC Mohammédia	Undisclosed	
31 July 2023	MF	(Morocco)	Anas Serrhat	MC Oujda	End of loan	
11 August 2023	FW	(Libya)	Hamdou Elhouni	–	Free transfer	
25 August 2023	MF	(Netherlands)	Soufyan Ahannach	–	Free transfer	
1 September 2023	DF	(Morocco)	Jamal Harkass	–	Free transfer	
22 January 2024	MF	(Morocco)	Oussama Zemraoui	SCC Mohammédia	Undisclosed	
22 January 2024	MF	(Morocco)	Ayoub Boucheta	SCC Mohammédia	Undisclosed	
29 January 2024	MF	(Mauritania)	Sidi Bouna Amar	(Mauritania) FC Nouadhibou	Undisclosed	
1 February 2024	FW	(Morocco)	Ismail El Haddad	(Qatar) Al-Khor SC	Free transfer	
1 February 2024	DF	(Morocco)	Badr Gaddarine	MC Oujda	Undisclosed	

=== Loans in ===
Date from	Position	Nationality	Name	From	Date to	Ref.
16 July 2023	FW	(Morocco)	Montasser Lahtimi	(Turkey) Trabzonspor	30 June 2024	
1 February 2024	FW	(Nigeria)	Ade Oguns	(Venezuela) Caracas F.C.	30 June 2024	

=== Out ===
Date	Position	Nationality	Name	To	Fee	Ref.
10 July 2023	FW	(Morocco)	Badie Aouk	–	End of contract	
18 July 2023	MF	(Libya)	Muaid Ellafi	–	End of contract	
21 July 2023	FW	(Morocco)	Hamid Ahadad	Fath Union Sport	Free transfer	
26 July 2023	MF	(Morocco)	Reda Jaadi	–	End of contract	
26 July 2023	DF	(Morocco)	Hamza Ait Allal	–	End of contract	
29 July 2023	MF	(Morocco)	Ayman El Hassouni	–	End of contract	
31 July 2023	MF	(Morocco)	Jalal Daoudi	–	End of contract	
22 August 2023	DF	(Algeria)	Houcine Benayada	(Algeria) CR Belouizdad	End of contract	
28 August 2023	GK	(Morocco)	Ahmed Reda Tagnaouti	Maghreb de Fès	Free transfer	
13 January 2024	DF	(Morocco)	Hamza Regragui	(India) NorthEast United FC	Free transfer	
18 January 2024	DF	(Morocco)	Sami El Anabi	(Malta) Marsaxlokk F.C.	Free transfer	
24 January 2024	FW	(Morocco)	Zouhair El Moutaraji	(Bahrain) Al-Khaldiya SC	Undisclosed	
25 January 2024	MF	(Netherlands)	Soufyan Ahannach	Union de Touarga	Undisclosed	
4 February 2024	FW	(Senegal)	Bouly Sambou	(Turkey) Konyaspor	Undisclosed	
8 February 2024	DF	(Morocco)	Yahia Attiyat Allah	(Russia) PFC Sochi	Undisclosed	

=== Loans out ===
Date from	Position	Nationality	Name	To	Date to	Ref.
19 February 2024	MF	(Morocco)	Ismail Moutaraji	(United Arab Emirates) Al Dhafra FC	30 June 2024	

=== Released ===
Date	Position	Nationality	Name	Joined	Date	Ref
	FW	(Morocco)	Hicham Boussefiane	–		

== Competitions ==
=== Overview ===
Competition	First match	Last match	Starting round	Final position	Record							
Competition	First match	Last match	Starting round	Final position	Pld	W	D	L	GF	GA	GD	Win %
Botola	31 August 2023	14 June 2024	Matchday 1	6th	30	12	8	10	31	27	+4	40.00
Throne Cup	31 March 2024		Round of 32	Round of 32	1	0	0	1	0	1	−1	0.00
CAF Champions League	17 September 2023	2 March 2024	Second round	Group stage	8	4	1	3	7	5	+2	50.00
African Football League	22 October 2023	12 November 2023	Quarter-finals	Runners-up	6	4	0	2	7	4	+3	66.67
Arab Club Champions Cup	27 July 2023	2 August 2023	Group stage	Group stage	3	0	2	1	2	3	−1	0.00
Total					48	20	11	17	47	40	+7	41.67

Source: Competitions

=== Botola ===
==== League table ====
Pos	Team	Pld	W	D	L	GF	GA	GD	Pts	Qualification or relegation
4	Union de Touarga (Q)	30	12	8	10	36	33	+3	44 (Note: Union de Touarga finished ahead of Olympic Safi and Wydad AC on head-to-head points: Union de Touarga 7, Olympic Safi 6, Wydad AC 4)	Qualification for Confederation Cup
5	Olympic Safi	30	11	11	8	29	26	+3	44	
6	Wydad AC	30	12	8	10	31	27	+4	44	
7	FUS Rabat	30	11	10	9	32	28	+4	43	
8	RCA Zemamra	30	11	7	12	35	35	0	40	

Source: FRMF.ma
Rules for classification: 1) Points; 2a) Head-to-head goal difference if they are two teams with equal points; 2b) Goal difference if they are more than two teams with equal points; 3) Number of wins; 4) Goals scored; 5) Play-off between involved teams.
(Q) Qualified for the phase indicated

==== Results summary ====
Overall								Home						Away					
Pld	W	D	L	GF	GA	GD	Pts	W	D	L	GF	GA	GD	W	D	L	GF	GA	GD
30	12	8	10	31	27	+4	44	8	2	5	17	13	+4	4	6	5	14	14	0

Source: Competitive matches

==== Results by round ====
Round	1	2	3	4	5	6	7	8	9	10	11	12	13	14	15	16	17	18	19	20	21	22	23	24	25	26	27	28	29	30
Ground	H	A	H	A	H	A	H	A	H	A	A	H	A	H	A	A	H	A	H	A	H	A	H	A	H	H	A	H	A	H
Result	L	W	W	D	W	W	W	W	W	L	D	D	L	L	D	L	W	L	W	D	L	W	D	D	L	W	D	L	L	W
Position	16	9	5	5	4	2	1	1	1	1	3	3	3	4	4	4	4	4	3	3	4	4	3	3	3	4	4	5	7	6

Source: Competitive matches
A = Away; H = Home; W = Win; D = Draw; L = Loss

==== Matches ====
31 August 2023 1	Wydad AC	0–2	Fath Union Sport	Casablanca
21:30 UTC+1	Attiyat Allah (yellow card) 67'; Haimoud (yellow card) 90+5'	Report	Hannouri 32'; El Bassi (yellow card) 51'; El Ouadghiri (yellow card) 52'; Nanah 54'; Elaz (yellow card) 64'; El Msane (yellow card) 68'; Aymane (yellow card) 90+3'	Stadium: Stade Mohammed V Referee: Mohamed El Baroudi

3 September 2023 2	SCC Mohammédia	2–3	Wydad AC	Mohammedia
21:30 UTC+1	Bahaj 31'; Boucheta (yellow card) 42'; Ennakhli 45+3'	Report	Zola 14'; Sambou 40'; El Amloud 68'; Bouhra (yellow card) 85'	Stadium: Stade El Bachir; Referee: Samir Guezzaz

21 September 2023 3	Wydad AC	1–0	JS Soualem	Casablanca
20:00 UTC+1	Draoui 85'; Aboulfath (red card) 86'	Report	Erbibi (yellow card) 20'; Bahsain (yellow card) 30'	Stadium: Stade Mohammed V Referee: Mohamed Balloute

24 September 2023 4	RS Berkane	0–0	Wydad AC	Berkane
21:30 UTC+1	Arjoune (yellow card) 23'; Tahif (red card) 41'; Lamine Camara (yellow card) 50'; Dayo (yellow card) 66'	Report	Jabrane (yellow card) 34'; Lahtimi (yellow card) 68'	Stadium: Stade Municipal de Berkane; Referee: Redouane Jiyed

4 October 2023 5	Wydad AC	3–1	RCA Zemamra	Casablanca
18:15 UTC+1	Sambou 21'; El Amloud (yellow card) 60'; Jabrane 65', (yellow card) 67'; Elhouni (yellow card) 69'; Ahannach (yellow card) 90+2'; El Bahri 90+6'	Report	Bahrou 3'; Hadraf (yellow card) 78'; Bouzidi (red card) 83'; Cherkaoui (yellow card) 90+10'	Stadium: Stade Mohammed V Referee: Yassine Bouslim

7 October 2023 6	Ittihad Tanger	0–3	Wydad AC	Tétouan
20:30 UTC+1	Konaté (yellow card) 23'; Jaadi (yellow card) 34'; Saoud (yellow card) 52'; Daoudi (yellow card) 71'	Report	El Bahri 18', 65', 75'; Draoui (yellow card) 45+1'; Serrhat (yellow card) 63'; Attiyat Allah (yellow card) 73'; Aboulfath (yellow card) 83'	Stadium: Saniat Rmel Stadium; Attendance: 0 Referee: Hamza El Fareq

28 November 2023 10	AS FAR	3–1	Wydad AC	Kenitra
18:00 UTC+1	Naji 58'; Ait Ouarkhane 85'; Diakite 90'	Report	Jabrane 45+12' (pen.)	Stadium: Kenitra Municipal Stadium; Referee: Hamza El Fariq

6 December 2023 7	Wydad AC	3–1	MC Oujda	Mohammedia
18:00 UTC+1	Attiyat Allah 62'; Boussefiane 66'; Sambou 79'	Report	Anouar 49'	Stadium: El Bachir Stadium; Referee: Mohamed Lahouidri

12 December 2023 8	Union de Touarga	0–1	Wydad AC	Rabat
18:00 UTC+1		Report	El Amloud 90+3'	Stadium: Stade Moulay Hassan; Referee: Mohamed Nhayeh

23 December 2023 9	Wydad AC	1–0	Youssoufia Berrechid	Mohammedia
18:00 UTC+1	Attiyat Allah 17'	Report		Stadium: El Bachir Stadium; Referee: Hicham Tamsamani

26 December 2023 11	Hassania Agadir	0–0	Wydad AC	Agadir
18:00 UTC+1		Report		Stadium: Stade Adrar; Referee: Samir Guezzaz

29 December 2023 13	OC Safi	2–1	Wydad AC	Safi
18:00 UTC+1	Najjari 40'; Haba 57'	Report	Sambou 82'	Stadium: Stade El Massira; Referee: Redouane Jiyed

3 January 2024 14	Wydad AC	0–2	Raja CA	Mohammedia
18:00 UTC+1		Report	Ait Brayem 51' (o.g.); Zrida 65'	Stadium: El Bachir Stadium; Attendance: 0 Referee: Jalal Jayid

7 January 2024 15	Moghreb Tétouan	0–0	Wydad AC	Tétouan
18:00 UTC+1		Report		Stadium: Stade Saniat Rmel; Attendance: 0 Referee: Hamza El Fariq

11 January 2024 12	Wydad AC	1–1	Maghreb de Fès	Mohammedia
18:00 UTC+1	Aboulfath 28'	Report	Bouriga 19' (pen.)	Stadium: El Bachir Stadium; Referee: Youssef Triki

7 February 2024 16	Fath Union Sport	2–1	Wydad AC	Rabat
16:00 UTC+1	Nanah 63' (pen.); Laalaoui 90+5'	Report	Gaddarine 29' (pen.)	Stadium: Stade Moulay Hassan; Referee: Nabil Benrkiya

11 February 2024 17	Wydad AC	5–2	SCC Mohammédia	Mohammedia
18:00 UTC+1	Bouna Amar 8', 77'; Oguns 37', 61'; El Amloud 85' (pen.)	Report	Dalouzi 59'; Safsafi 90+4'	Stadium: El Bachir Stadium; Referee: Jalal Jayid

14 February 2024 18	JS Soualem	3–1	Wydad AC	Mohammedia
20:00 UTC+1	El Khaloui 21'; El Motie 61' (o.g.); Sakhi 68'	Report	Draoui 31'	Stadium: El Bachir Stadium; Referee: Mohamed El Baroudi

17 February 2024 19	Wydad AC	1–0	RS Berkane	Mohammedia
18:00 UTC+1	Oguns 55'	Report		Stadium: El Bachir Stadium; Referee: Daki Reddad

5 March 2024 20	RCA Zemamra	0–0	Wydad AC	Zemamra
18:00 UTC+1		Report		Stadium: Stade Ahmed Choukri; Attendance: 0 Referee: Abderrahim Arrakhiz

9 March 2024 23	Wydad AC	0–0	Union de Touarga	Mohammedia
16:00 UTC+1		Report		Stadium: El Bachir Stadium; Referee: Ahmed Aderdou

12 March 2024 21	Wydad AC	0–2	IR Tanger	Mohammedia
22:00		Report	Madické 11'; Khafi 13'	Stadium: El Bachir Stadium; Referee: Samir Guezzaz

17 March 2024 24	Youssoufia Berrechid	0–0	Wydad AC	Berrechid
22:00		Report		Stadium: Berrechid Municipal Stadium; Referee: Redouane Jiyed

21 March 2024 22	MC Oujda	0–2	Wydad AC	Oujda
22:00		Report	Oguns 70', 83'	Stadium: Honneur Stadium; Referee: Mouhcine Sourdy

13 April 2024 25	Wydad AC	0–1	AS FAR	Mohammedia
18:00 UTC+1		Report	Hrimat 45+1'	Stadium: El Bachir Stadium; Referee: Hicham Tamsamani

20 April 2024 26	Wydad AC	1–0	Hassania Agadir	Mohammedia
21:00 UTC+1	El Haddad 24'	Report		Stadium: El Bachir Stadium; Referee: Bouchra Karboubi

28 April 2024 27	Maghreb de Fès	1–1	Wydad AC	Fez
19:00 UTC+1	Nsundi 77'	Report	Bouna Amar 44'	Stadium: Stade Hassan-II; Referee: Said Boujidi

28 May 2024 28	Wydad AC	0–1	OC Safi	Mohammedia
19:00 UTC+1		Report	Najjari 55'	Stadium: El Bachir Stadium; Referee: Youssef Triki

2 June 2024 29	Raja CA	1–0	Wydad AC	Berrechid
18:00 UTC+1	Ennafati 90+2'	Report		Stadium: Stade Municipal de Berrechid; Attendance: 0 Referee: Karim Sabri

14 June 2024 30	Wydad AC	1–0	MA Tétouan	Mohammedia
18:00 UTC+1	Mahrous 90+7'	Report		Stadium: El Bachir Stadium; Referee: Mohamed Bellote

=== Throne Cup ===
31 March 2024 Round of 32	Wydad AC	0–1	JS Soualem	Mohammedia
22:00		Report	El Keraa 23'	Stadium: El Bachir Stadium; Referee: Hamza El Fariq

=== CAF Champions League ===
==== Second round ====
17 September 2023 First leg	Hafia (Guinea)	1–1	(Morocco) Wydad AC	Conakry, Guinea
16:00 UTC+0	Damaro 45+2'; Bangoura (yellow card) 57'	Report	Sambou 10', (yellow card) 40'; Jabrane (yellow card) 45'; Serrhat (yellow card) 90+7'	Stadium: General Lansana Conté Stadium; Referee: Patrick Tanguy Vlei (Ivory Coast)

30 September 2023 Second leg	Wydad AC (Morocco)	3–0 (4–1 agg.)	(Guinea) Hafia	Casablanca, Morocco
20:00 UTC+1	Attiyat Allah 8'; Elhouni 24'; Sambou (yellow card) 29'; El Amloud 57'; Aboulfath (yellow card) 71'; Jabrane (yellow card) 90'	Report	Camara (yellow card) 20'; Bangoura (yellow card) 34'; Drame (yellow card) 64'; Camara (red card) 75'	Stadium: Stade Mohammed V Referee: Djindo Louis Houngnandande (Benin)

==== Group stage ====
===== Group B =====
Pos	Team	Pld	W	D	L	GF	GA	GD	Pts	Qualification
1	(Ivory Coast) ASEC Mimosas	6	3	2	1	7	2	+5	11	Advance to knockout stage
2	(Tanzania) Simba	6	2	3	1	9	2	+7	9 (Note: Ranked on head-to-head goal difference: Simba +1, Wydad AC –1.)	Advance to knockout stage
3	(Morocco) Wydad AC	6	3	0	3	3	4	−1	9	
4	(Botswana) Jwaneng Galaxy	6	1	1	4	1	12	−11	4	

Source: CAF
Notes:

25 November 2023 1	Wydad AC (Morocco)	0–1	(Botswana) Jwaneng Galaxy	Marrakesh, Morocco
20:00 UTC+1		Report	Sesinyi 33'	Stadium: Marrakesh Stadium; Referee: Omar Artan (Somalia)

2 December 2023 2	ASEC Mimosas (Ivory Coast)	1–0	(Morocco) Wydad AC	Abidjan, Côte d'Ivoire
19:00 UTC+0	Karamoko 72'	Report		Stadium: Felix Houphouet Boigny Stadium; Referee: Patrice Tanguy Mebiame (Gabon)

9 December 2023 3	Wydad AC (Morocco)	1–0	(Tanzania) Simba	Marrakesh, Morocco
20:00 UTC+1	Draoui 90+5'	Report		Stadium: Marrakesh Stadium; Referee: Abongile Tom (South Africa)

19 December 2023 4	Simba (Tanzania)	2–0	(Morocco) Wydad AC	Dar es Salaam, Tanzania
16:00 UTC+3	Onana 36', 38'	Report		Stadium: National Stadium; Referee: Pierre Atcho (Gabon)

24 February 2024 5	Jwaneng Galaxy (Botswana)	0–1	(Morocco) Wydad AC	Gaborone, Botswana
15:00 UTC+2		Report	Gaddarine 45+2'	Stadium: Botswana National Stadium; Referee: Peter Waweru (Kenya)

2 March 2024 6	Wydad AC (Morocco)	1–0	(Ivory Coast) ASEC Mimosas	Marrakesh, Morocco
17:00 UTC+1	Lahtimi 18'	Report		Stadium: Marrakesh Stadium; Referee: Abdel Aziz Mohamed Bouh (Mauritania)

=== African Football League ===
==== Quarter-finals ====
22 October 2023 First leg	Enyimba (Nigeria)	0–1	(Morocco) Wydad AC	Uyo, Nigeria
19:00 UTC+1	Ojo (yellow card) 37'; Orinate (red card) 90+4'	Report	Aboulfath (yellow card) 15'; Boussefiane (yellow card) 35'; Jabrane 39' (pen.), (yellow card) 53'	Stadium: Godswill Akpabio International Stadium; Referee: Alhadi Allaou Mahamat (Chad)

26 October 2023 Second leg	Wydad AC (Morocco)	3–0 (4–0 agg.)	(Nigeria) Enyimba	Casablanca, Morocco
19:00 UTC+1	El Amloud 4'; Harkass 38'; Attiyat Allah 43'	Report	Ojo (yellow card) 6'; Awazie (yellow card) 41'; Cooper (yellow card) 51'; Daga (yellow card) 56'	Stadium: Stade Mohammed V Referee: Pierre Atcho (Gabon)

==== Semi-finals ====
29 October 2023 First leg	Wydad AC (Morocco)	1–0	(Tunisia) ES Tunis	Casablanca, Morocco
19:00 UTC+1	Boussefiane 58'; Ahannach (yellow card) 63'; El Motie (yellow card) 90+4'	Report	Bouchniba (yellow card) 20'; Tka (yellow card) 52'	Stadium: Stade Mohammed V Referee: Amin Omar (Egypt)

1 November 2023 Second leg	ES Tunis (Tunisia)	1–0 (1–1 agg.) (4–5 p)	(Morocco) Wydad AC	Tunis, Tunisia
16:00 UTC+1	Ben Hamida (yellow card) 73'; Rodrigues 66'	Report	El Bahri (yellow card) 42'	Stadium: Stade Hammadi Agrebi; Referee: Peter Waweru (Kenya)
	Penalties
	Meriah (penalty scored); Rodrigues (penalty missed); Derbali (penalty scored); Bouchniba (penalty scored); Tougai (penalty scored)		(penalty scored) Jabrane; (penalty scored) El Amloud; (penalty scored) Aboulfath; (penalty scored) Ounajem; (penalty scored) Sambou

==== Final ====
5 November 2023 First leg	Wydad AC (Morocco)	2–1	(South Africa) Mamelodi Sundowns	Casablanca, Morocco
19:00 UTC+1	Coetzee 41' (o.g.); El Amloud (yellow card) 47'; Jabrane (yellow card) 73'; Serrhat 78'	Report	Boutouil 74' (pen.)	Stadium: Stade Mohammed V Referee: Mahmood Ismail (Sudan)

12 November 2023 Second leg	Mamelodi Sundowns (South Africa)	2–0 (3–2 agg.)	(Morocco) Wydad AC	Pretoria, South Africa
15:00 UTC+2	Shalulile 45+3'; Modiba 53'; Williams (yellow card) 86'; Zwane (yellow card) 89'; Mudau (yellow card) 90+9'; Mokoena (yellow card) 90+9'; Maseko (yellow card) 90+10'	Report	El Bahri (yellow card) 38'; Serrhat (yellow card) 45+12'	Stadium: Loftus Versfeld Stadium; Referee: Jean-Jacques Ndala Ngambo (DR Congo)

=== Arab Club Champions Cup ===
==== Group stage ====
===== Group B =====
Pos	Team	Pld	W	D	L	GF	GA	GD	Pts	Qualification
1	(Qatar) Al-Sadd	3	2	1	0	4	2	+2	7	Advance to knockout stage
2	(Saudi Arabia) Al-Hilal	3	1	1	1	4	4	0	4	Advance to knockout stage
3	(Morocco) Wydad AC	3	0	2	1	2	3	−1	2	
4	(Libya) Al-Ahli Tripoli	3	0	2	1	1	2	−1	2	

Source: UAFA
Rules for classification: Group stage tiebreakers

27 July 2023 1	Al Sadd (Qatar)	0–0	(Morocco) Wydad AC	Abha, Saudi Arabia
16:00 UTC+3	Salman (yellow card) 44'; Assadalla (yellow card) 45+4'; Uribe (yellow card) 71'	Report	Jabrane (red card) 36'; Chetti (yellow card) 77'; Aboulfath (yellow card) 84'; El Motie (yellow card) 90+4'	Stadium: Prince Sultan bin Abdul Aziz Stadium; Referee: Mahmoud El Banna (Egypt)

30 July 2023 2	Wydad AC (Morocco)	1–1	(Libya) Al Ahli Tripoli	Abha, Saudi Arabia
16:00 UTC+3	Moutaraji (yellow card) 44'; El Amloud 45+2'; Boussefiane (red card) 90+2'	Report	Krawa'a 48'	Stadium: Prince Sultan bin Abdul Aziz Stadium; Referee: Sadok Selmi (Tunisia)

2 August 2023 3	Al-Hilal (Saudi Arabia)	2–1	(Morocco) Wydad AC	Abha, Saudi Arabia
16:00 UTC+3	Milinković-Savić 41'; Al-Bulaihi (yellow card) 58'; Al-Hamdan (yellow card) 62'; Al-Shahrani (yellow card) 64'; Neves 66'; Al-Mayouf (yellow card) 81'; Kanno (yellow card) 90+2'	Report	Zola (yellow card) 3'; Moutaraji (yellow card) 21'; Aboulfath (yellow card) 47'; Draoui (yellow card) 61'; Bouhra 64'; Jabrane (yellow card) 78'; Ounajem (yellow card) 83'	Stadium: Prince Sultan bin Abdul Aziz Stadium; Referee: Ali Sabah (Iraq)

== Squad statistics ==
=== Appearances and goals ===
No.	Pos	Nat	Player	Total		Botola		Throne Cup		Champions League		African Football League		Arab Club Champions Cup	
No.	Pos	Nat	Player	Apps	Goals	Apps	Goals	Apps	Goals	Apps	Goals	Apps	Goals	Apps	Goals
Goalkeepers
1	GK	(Morocco) MAR	Mehdi Maftah	4	0	3	0	0	0	1	0	0	0	0	0
12	GK	(Morocco) MAR	Taha Mourid	0	0	0	0	0	0	0	0	0	0	0	0
32	GK	(Morocco) MAR	Youssef El Motie	44	0	27	0	1	0	7	0	6	0	3	0
40	GK	(France) FRA	Boubacar Bah	0	0	0	0	0	0	0	0	0	0	0	0
Defenders
4	DF	(Morocco) MAR	Amine Aboulfath	31	1	17+3	1	0	0	2	0	6	0	3	0
8	DF	(Morocco) MAR	Badr Gaddarine	23	2	8+3	1	1	0	2	1	6	0	3	0
16	DF	(Morocco) MAR	Jamal Harkass	35	1	23+1	0	1	0	4	0	6	1	0	0
18	DF	(Morocco) MAR	Oussama Falouh	0	0	0	0	0	0	0	0	0	0	0	0
20	DF	(Algeria) ALG	Ilyes Chetti	18	0	12+1	0	0	0	0+1	0	0+2	0	2	0
22	DF	(Morocco) MAR	Ayoub El Amloud	32	6	21	3	0	0	2	1	6	1	3	1
24	DF	(Morocco) MAR	Ayoub Boucheta	7	1	5+2	0	0	0	0	0	0	0	0	1
25	DF	(Morocco) MAR	Amine Farhane	19	0	9+4	0	1	0	4	0	0	0	1	0
27	DF	(Morocco) MAR	Hicham Ait Brayem	6	0	4+1	0	0	0	1	0	0	0	0	0
35	DF	(Democratic Republic of the Congo) COD	Arsène Zola	12	1	6+1	1	0	0	2	0	0	0	3	0
Midfielders
2	MF	(Morocco) MAR	Oussama Mahrous	13	1	1+8	1	0	0	0+1	0	0+1	0	1+1	0
3	MF	(Morocco) MAR	Anas Serrhat	32	1	12+8	0	1	0	2+5	0	1+3	1	0	0
5	MF	(Morocco) MAR	Yahya Jabrane	36	3	21+1	2	0	0	7	0	5	1	2	0
6	MF	(Morocco) MAR	Houmam Baaouch	0	0	0	0	0	0	0	0	0	0	0	0
9	FW	(Mauritania) MTN	Sidi Bouna Amar	11	3	10+1	3	0	0	0	0	0	0	0	0
13	MF	(Morocco) MAR	Abdellah Haimoud	31	0	11+5	0	1	0	4+2	0	3+2	0	2+1	0
17	MF	(Algeria) ALG	Zakaria Draoui	46	3	25+3	2	1	0	8	1	6	0	3	0
27	MF	(Morocco) MAR	Oussama Zemraoui	4	0	1+3	0	0	0	0	0	0	0	0	0
Forwards
7	FW	(Morocco) MAR	Ismail El Haddad	15	1	7+5	1	1	0	2	0	0	0	0	0
10	FW	(Libya) LBA	Hamdou Elhouni	27	1	14+5	0	0	0	3+1	1	1+3	0	0	0
11	FW	(Morocco) MAR	Mohamed Ounajem	33	0	8+12	0	0	0	0+5	0	1+4	0	2+1	0
18	FW	(Nigeria) NGR	Ade Oguns	18	5	14+1	5	1	0	2	0	0	0	0	0
19	FW	(Morocco) MAR	Montasser Lahtimi	39	1	16+6	0	0	0	7+1	1	5+1	0	2+1	0
21	FW	(Morocco) MAR	Charki El Bahri	26	4	5+9	4	0	0	2+4	0	6	0	0	0
29	FW	(Morocco) MAR	Imad Khannouss	5	0	0+4	0	0	0	0	0	0	0	0+1	0
30	FW	(Morocco) MAR	Saifeddine Bouhra	40	1	14+13	0	1	0	5+3	0	0+3	0	0+1	1
34	FW	(Morocco) MAR	Salaheddine Benyachou	0	0	0	0	0	0	0	0	0	0	0	0
37	FW	(Morocco) MAR	Monir El Habach	4	0	1+3	0	0	0	0	0	0	0	0	0
Players transferred/loaned out during the season
7	FW	(Morocco) MAR	Zouhair El Moutaraji	5	0	1	0	0	0	0+2	0	0	0	2	0
8	MF	(Morocco) MAR	Ismail Moutaraji	5	0	2	0	0	0	0	0	0	0	2+1	0
14	DF	(Morocco) MAR	Yahia Attiyat Allah	23	4	11	2	0	0	6	1	6	1	0	0
15	DF	(Morocco) MAR	Hamza Regragui	3	0	1+2	0	0	0	0	0	0	0	0	0
18	MF	(Netherlands) NED	Soufyan Ahannach	13	0	4+3	0	0	0	1+1	0	3+1	0	0	0
23	FW	(Morocco) MAR	Hicham Boussefiane	23	2	3+8	1	0	0	2+2	0	6	1	1+1	0
27	FW	(Senegal) SEN	Bouly Sambou	26	5	10+3	4	0	0	4+2	1	0+4	0	1+2	0

Source: Soccerway

=== Goalscorers ===
Rank	No.	Pos.	Nat.	Name	Botola	Throne Cup	CAF Champions League	African Football League	Arab Club Champions Cup	Total
1	22	DF	(Morocco)	Ayoub El Amloud	3	0	1	1	1	6
2	18	FW	(Nigeria)	Ade Oguns	5	0	0	0	0	5
2	27	FW	(Senegal)	Bouly Sambou	4	0	1	0	0	5
4	21	FW	(Morocco)	Charki El Bahri	4	0	0	0	0	4
4	14	DF	(Morocco)	Yahia Attiyat Allah	2	0	1	1	0	4
6	5	MF	(Morocco)	Yahya Jabrane	2	0	0	1	0	3
6	9	MF	(Mauritania)	Sidi Bouna Amar	3	0	0	0	0	3
6	17	MF	(Algeria)	Zakaria Draoui	2	0	1	0	0	3
9	8	DF	(Morocco)	Badr Gaddarine	1	0	1	0	0	2
10	4	DF	(Morocco)	Amine Aboulfath	1	0	0	0	0	1
10	2	MF	(Morocco)	Oussama Mahrous	1	0	0	0	0	1
10	19	FW	(Morocco)	Montasser Lahtimi	0	0	1	0	0	1
10	7	FW	(Morocco)	Ismail El Haddad	1	0	0	0	0	1
10	30	FW	(Morocco)	Saifeddine Bouhra	0	0	0	0	1	1
10	35	DF	(Democratic Republic of the Congo)	Arsène Zola	1	0	0	0	0	1
10	10	FW	(Libya)	Hamdou Elhouni	0	0	1	0	0	1
10	16	DF	(Morocco)	Jamal Harkass	0	0	0	1	0	1
10	23	FW	(Morocco)	Hicham Boussefiane	0	0	0	1	0	1
10	3	MF	(Morocco)	Anas Serrhat	0	0	0	1	0	1
Own goals					0	0	0	1	0	1
Totals					31	0	7	7	2	47

=== Clean sheets ===
Rank	No.	Pos.	Nat.	Name	Botola	Throne Cup	CAF Champions League	African Football League	Arab Club Champions Cup	Total
1	32	GK	(Morocco)	Youssef El Motie	12	0	3	3	1	19
2	1	GK	(Morocco)	Mehdi Maftah	3	0	1	0	0	4
Totals					15	0	4	3	1	23

=== Disciplinary record ===
No.	Pos.	Nat.	Player	Botola		Throne Cup		CAF Champions League		African Football League		Arab Club Champions Cup		Total	
No.	Pos.	Nat.	Player	Yellow card	Red card	Yellow card	Red card	Yellow card	Red card	Yellow card	Red card	Yellow card	Red card	Yellow card	Red card
2	MF	(Morocco)	Oussama Mahrous	2	0	0	0	0	0	0	0	0	0	2	0
3	MF	(Morocco)	Anas Serrhat	6	1	0	0	2	0	0	0	0	0	8	1
4	DF	(Morocco)	Amine Aboulfath	8	3	0	0	1	0	0	0	2	0	11	3
5	MF	(Morocco)	Yahya Jabrane	6	0	0	0	4	0	0	0	1	1	11	1
7	FW	(Morocco)	Ismail El Haddad	2	0	0	0	0	0	0	0	0	0	2	0
8	DF	(Morocco)	Badr Gaddarine	1	0	0	0	0	0	0	0	0	0	1	0
9	MF	(Mauritania)	Sidi Bouna Amar	1	0	0	0	0	0	0	0	0	0	1	0
10	FW	(Libya)	Hamdou Elhouni	2	0	0	0	0	0	0	0	0	0	2	0
11	FW	(Morocco)	Mohamed Ounajem	1	0	0	0	1	0	0	0	1	0	3	0
13	MF	(Morocco)	Abdellah Haimoud	5	0	0	0	1	0	0	0	0	0	6	0
16	DF	(Morocco)	Jamal Harkass	5	1	0	0	0	0	0	0	0	0	5	1
17	MF	(Algeria)	Zakaria Draoui	3	0	0	0	2	0	0	0	1	0	6	0
19	FW	(Morocco)	Montasser Lahtimi	2	0	0	0	0	0	0	0	0	0	2	0
22	DF	(Morocco)	Ayoub El Amloud	1	0	0	0	0	0	0	0	0	0	1	0
20	DF	(Algeria)	Ilyes Chetti	3	1	0	0	0	0	0	0	1	0	4	1
25	DF	(Morocco)	Amine Farhane	3	0	0	0	0	0	0	0	0	0	3	0
30	FW	(Morocco)	Saifeddine Bouhra	4	1	0	0	0	0	0	0	0	0	4	1
32	GK	(Morocco)	Youssef El Motie	2	0	0	0	3	0	0	0	1	0	6	0
35	DF	(Democratic Republic of the Congo)	Arsène Zola	1	0	0	0	0	0	0	0	1	0	2	0
Players transferred/loaned out during the season
2	MF	(Morocco)	Ismail Moutaraji	0	0	0	0	0	0	0	0	2	0	2	0
14	DF	(Morocco)	Yahia Attiyat Allah	2	0	0	0	0	0	0	0	0	0	2	0
23	FW	(Morocco)	Hicham Boussefiane	0	0	0	0	0	0	0	0	0	1	0	1
24	MF	(Netherlands)	Soufyan Ahannach	1	0	0	0	0	0	0	0	0	0	1	0
27	FW	(Senegal)	Bouly Sambou	3	0	0	0	3	0	0	0	0	0	6	0
Totals				64	7	0	0	14	0	0	0	10	2	88	9
