= 2023 African Football League final =

African football tournament final

- Match programme cover
- Event: 2023 African Football League
Wydad AC	Mamelodi Sundowns
(Morocco)	(South Africa)
2	3

First leg
Wydad AC	Mamelodi Sundowns
2	1
- Date: 5 November 2023
- Venue: Stade Mohammed V, Casablanca
- Referee: Mahmood Ismail (Sudan)
- Attendance: 45,000
- Weather: Mostly cloudy 18 °C (64 °F); 84% humidity

Second leg
Mamelodi Sundowns	Wydad AC
2	0
- Date: 12 November 2023
- Venue: Loftus Versfeld Stadium, Pretoria
- Referee: Jean-Jacques Ndala Ngambo (DR Congo)
- Attendance: 50,000
- Weather: Partially covered 34 °C (93 °F); 22% humidity

The 2023 African Football League final were the final matches of the 2023 African Football League, the 1st edition of Africa's newest club football tournament, the African Football League, organized by the Confederation of African Football (CAF).

== Venues ==
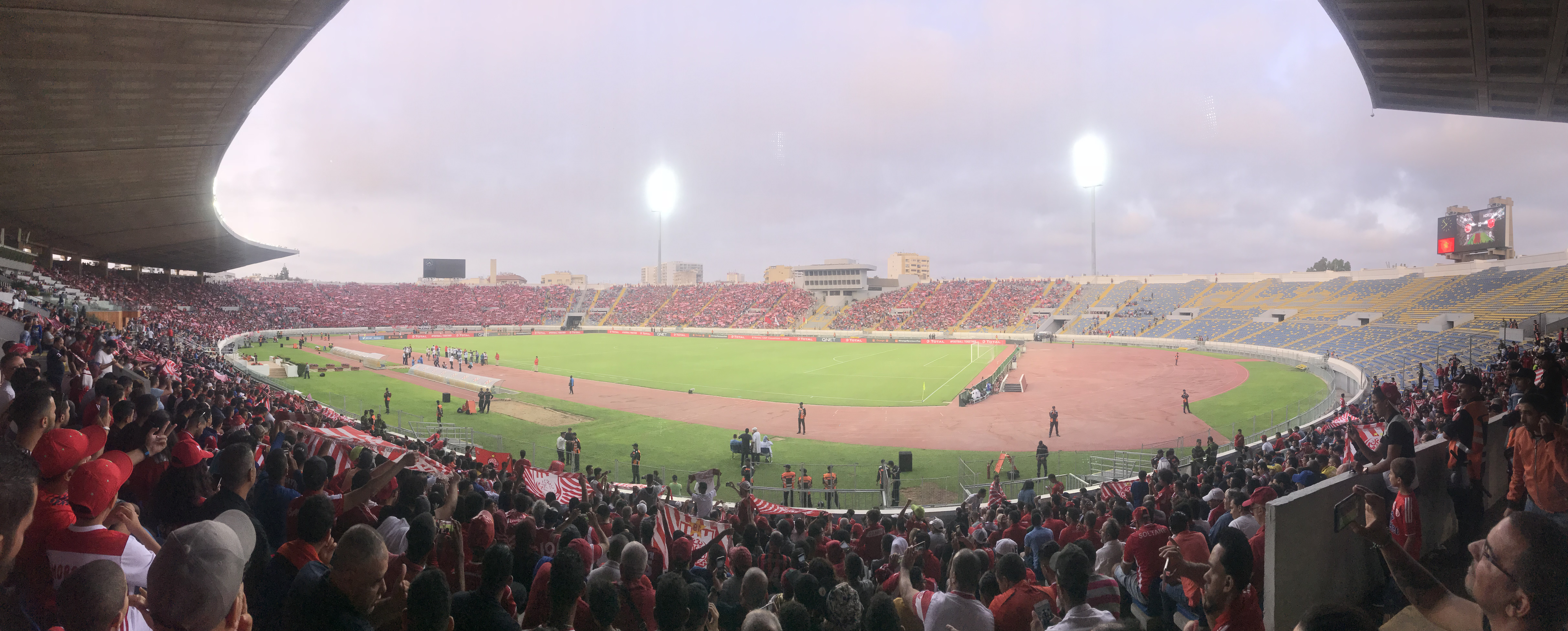
Stade Mohammed V in Casablanca, Morocco, hosted the first leg.

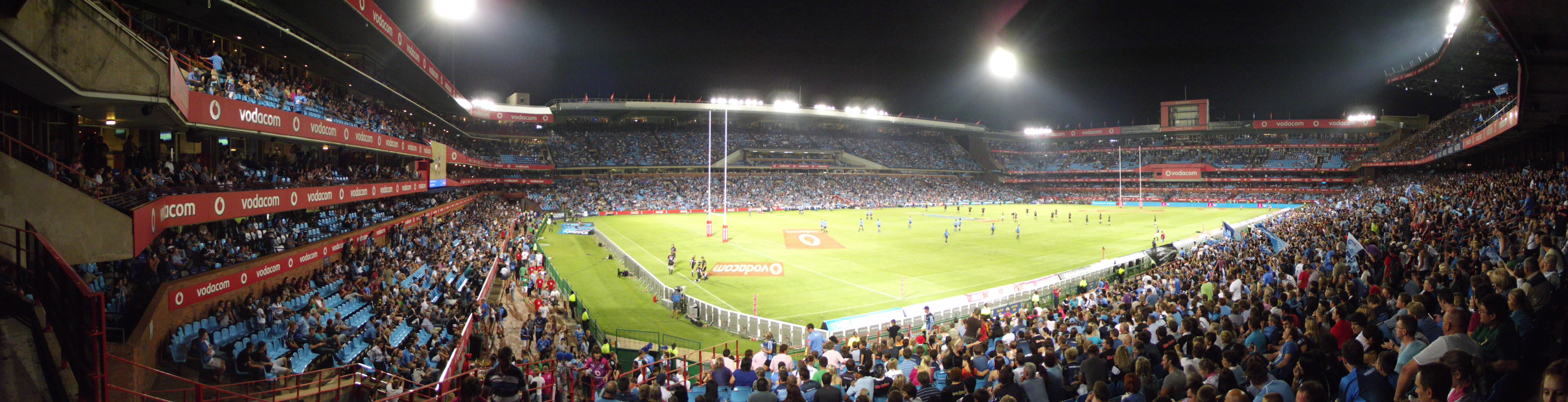
Loftus Versfeld Stadium in Pretoria, South Africa, hosted the second leg.

== Road to the final ==
Note: In all results below, the score of the finalist is given first (H: home; A: away).

(Morocco) Wydad AC				Round	(South Africa) Mamelodi Sundowns			
Opponent	Agg.	1st leg	2nd leg		Opponent	Agg.	1st leg	2nd leg
(Nigeria) Enyimba	4–0	1–0 (A)	3–0 (H)	Quarter-finals	(Angola) Petro de Luanda	2–0	2–0 (A)	0–0 (H)
(Tunisia) Espérance de Tunis	1–1 (5–4 p)	1–0 (H)	0–1 (A)	Semi-finals	(Egypt) Al Ahly	1–0	1–0 (H)	0–0 (A)

== Format ==
The final was played on a home-and-away two-legged basis.

If the aggregate score was tied after the second leg, the away goals rule was applied, and if still tied, extra time was played, and a penalty shoot-out was used to determine the winner.

== Matches ==
=== First leg ===
==== Details ====
5 November 2023
19:00 UTC+1

Wydad AC (Morocco)	2–1	(South Africa) Mamelodi Sundowns
Coetzee 41' (o.g.); Serrhat 78'	Report	Boutouil 74' (pen.)

Stade Mohammed V, Casablanca
Attendance: 45,000
Referee: Mahmood Ismail (Sudan)

Wydad AC	Mamelodi Sundowns

GK	32	(Morocco) Youssef El Motie
RB	22	(Morocco) Ayoub El Amloud	(yellow card) 47'
CB	4	(Morocco) Amine Aboulfath
CB	16	(Morocco) Jamal Harkass
LB	14	(Morocco) Yahia Attiyat Allah
RM	19	(Morocco) Montasser Lahtimi		(substituted off) 45+13'
CM	5	(Morocco) Yahya Jabrane (c)	(yellow card) 73'
CM	17	(Algeria) Zakaria Draoui
LM	23	(Morocco) Hicham Boussefiane		(substituted off) 66'
AM	13	(Morocco) Abdellah Haimoud		(substituted off) 65'
CF	21	(Morocco) Charki El Bahri		(substituted off) 78'
Substitutes:
GK	1	(Morocco) Mehdi Maftah
GK	40	(France) Boubacar Bah
DF	2	(Morocco) Oussama Mahrous
DF	15	(Morocco) Hamza Regragui
DF	20	(Algeria) Ilyes Chetti
DF	25	(Morocco) Amine Farhane
MF	3	(Morocco) Anas Serrhat		(substituted on) 65'
MF	24	(Netherlands) Soufyan Ahannach
FW	10	(Libya) Hamdou Elhouni		(substituted on) 45+13'
FW	11	(Morocco) Mohamed Ounajem		(substituted on) 66'
FW	27	(Senegal) Bouly Sambou		(substituted on) 78'
FW	30	(Morocco) Saifeddine Bouhra
Manager:
(Morocco) Adil Ramzi

GK	30	(South Africa) Ronwen Williams
RB	25	(South Africa) Khuliso Mudau
CB	40	(South Africa) Rivaldo Coetzee
CB	20	(South Africa) Grant Kekana	(substituted off) 45'
LB	13	(Morocco) Abdelmounaim Boutouil
RM	11	(Chile) Marcelo Allende
DM	4	(South Africa) Teboho Mokoena
LM	17	(South Africa) Aubrey Modiba	(substituted off) 68'
RW	33	(South Africa) Thapelo Maseko	(substituted off) 45'
CF	18	(South Africa) Themba Zwane (c)	(substituted off) 81'
LW	7	(South Africa) Lesiba William Nku	(substituted off) 68'
Substitutes:
GK	1	(Uganda) Denis Onyango
DF	3	(South Africa) Rushine De Reuck
DF	5	(South Africa) Mosa Lebusa	(substituted on) 45'
DF	6	(Kenya) Brian Onyango
MF	8	(South Africa) Bongani Zungu	(substituted on) 81'
MF	14	(South Africa) Terrence Mashego
MF	21	(South Africa) Sphelele Mkhulise
MF	34	(South Africa) Mothobi Mvala
MF	35	(South Africa) Neo Maema	(substituted on) 68'
MF	39	(South Africa) Lebohang Maboe	(substituted on) 45'
FW	10	(Uruguay) Gastón Sirino	(substituted on) 68'
FW	22	(South Africa) Siyabonga Mabena
Manager:
(South Africa) Rhulani Mokwena

Assistant referees:
Mohammed Abdallah Ibrahim (Sudan)
Khalil Hassani (Djibouti)
Fourth official:
Samuel Uwikunda (Rwanda)
Video assistant referee:
Mustapha Ghorbal (Algeria)
Assistant video assistant referees:
Mokrane Gourari (Algeria)

Match rules
- 90 minutes.
- Twelve named substitutes, of which up to five may be used. (Note: Each team was only given three opportunities to make substitutions, excluding substitutions made at half-time.)

==== Statistics ====
First half
Statistic	Wydad AC	Mamelodi Sundowns
Goals scored	1	0
Total shots	2	1
Shots on target	1	0
Saves	0	0
Ball possession	56%	44%
Corner kicks	2	1
Fouls committed	9	7
Offsides	2	0
Yellow cards	0	0
Red cards	0	0

Second half
Statistic	Wydad AC	Mamelodi Sundowns
Goals scored	1	1
Total shots	6	6
Shots on target	1	2
Saves	1	0
Ball possession	43%	57%
Corner kicks	0	5
Fouls committed	7	6
Offsides	1	1
Yellow cards	2	0
Red cards	0	0

Overall
Statistic	Wydad AC	Mamelodi Sundowns
Goals scored	2	1
Total shots	8	7
Shots on target	2	2
Saves	1	0
Ball possession	49%	51%
Corner kicks	2	6
Fouls committed	16	13
Offsides	3	1
Yellow cards	2	0
Red cards	0	0

=== Second leg ===
==== Details ====
12 November 2023
15:00 UTC+2

Mamelodi Sundowns (South Africa)	2–0	(Morocco) Wydad AC
Shalulile 45+3'; Modiba 53'	Report

Loftus Versfeld Stadium, Pretoria
Attendance: 50,000
Referee: Jean-Jacques Ndala Ngambo (DR Congo)

Mamelodi Sundowns	Wydad AC

MF	4	(South Africa) Teboho Mokoena	(yellow card) 90+9'
DF	5	(South Africa) Mosa Lebusa
FW	7	(South Africa) Lesiba William Nku
FW	11	(Chile) Marcelo Allende		(substituted off) 90+8'
DF	13	(Morocco) Abdelmounaim Boutouil
MF	17	(South Africa) Aubrey Modiba		(substituted off) 89'
MF	18	(South Africa) Themba Zwane (c)	(yellow card) 89'	(substituted off) 90'
FW	23	(Brazil) Lucas Ribeiro Costa		(substituted off) 66'
DF	25	(South Africa) Khuliso Mudau	(yellow card) 90+9'
GK	30	(South Africa) Ronwen Williams	(yellow card) 86'
MF	34	(South Africa) Mothobi Mvala
FW	38	(Namibia) Peter Shalulile		(substituted off) 89'
Substitutes:
GK	1	(Uganda) Denis Onyango
DF	3	(South Africa) Rushine De Reuck
DF	6	(Kenya) Brian Onyango		(substituted on) 89'
MF	8	(South Africa) Bongani Zungu		(substituted on) 66'
FW	10	(Uruguay) Gastón Sirino
MF	14	(South Africa) Terrence Mashego		(substituted on) 89'
MF	21	(South Africa) Sphelele Mkhulise
FW	22	(South Africa) Siyabonga Mabena
MF	24	(South Africa) Sipho Mbule
FW	33	(South Africa) Thapelo Maseko	(yellow card) 90+10'	(substituted on) 90'
MF	35	(South Africa) Neo Maema
MF	39	(South Africa) Lebohang Maboe		(substituted on) 90+8'
Manager:
(South Africa) Rhulani Mokwena

MF	3	(Morocco) Anas Serrhat	(yellow card) 45+12'	(substituted off) 85'
DF	4	(Morocco) Amine Aboulfath
MF	13	(Morocco) Abdellah Haimoud		(substituted off) 65'
DF	14	(Morocco) Yahia Attiyat Allah
DF	16	(Morocco) Jamal Harkass
FW	19	(Morocco) Montasser Lahtimi		(substituted off) 45'
DF	22	(Morocco) Ayoub El Amloud (c)
FM	17	(Algeria) Zakaria Draoui
FW	21	(Morocco) Charki El Bahri	(yellow card) 38'	(substituted off) 45'
FW	23	(Morocco) Hicham Boussefiane		(substituted off) 65'
GK	32	(Morocco) Youssef El Motie
Substitutes:
GK	1	(Morocco) Mehdi Maftah
DF	2	(Morocco) Oussama Mahrous
FW	10	(Libya) Hamdou Elhouni		(substituted on) 65'
FW	11	(Morocco) Mohamed Ounajem		(substituted on) 85'
DF	15	(Morocco) Hamza Regragui
DF	20	(Algeria) Ilyes Chetti
MF	24	(Netherlands) Soufyan Ahannach		(substituted on) 65'
DF	25	(Morocco) Amine Farhane
FW	27	(Senegal) Bouly Sambou		(substituted on) 45'
FW	30	(Morocco) Saifeddine Bouhra		(substituted on) 45'
DF	35	(Democratic Republic of the Congo) Arsène Zola
GK	40	(France) Boubacar Bah
Manager:
(Morocco) Adil Ramzi

Assistant referees:
Elvis Guy Noupue Nguegoue (Cameroon)
Arsenio Shadrick Marongella (Mozambique)
Video assistant referee:
Peter Waweru (Kenya)
Assistant video assistant referees:
Haythem Guirat (Tunisia)

Match rules
- 90 minutes.
- Penalty shoot-out if tied on aggregate and away goals.
- Twelve named substitutes, of which up to five may be used.

==== Statistics ====
First half
Statistic	Mamelodi Sundowns	Wydad AC
Goals scored	1	0
Total shots	4	0
Shots on target	2	0
Saves	0	1
Ball possession	73%	27%
Corner kicks	2	0
Fouls committed	3	5
Offsides	2	0
Yellow cards	0	2
Red cards	0	0

Second half
Statistic	Mamelodi Sundowns	Wydad AC
Goals scored	1	0
Total shots	4	3
Shots on target	1	1
Saves	1	0
Ball possession	49%	51%
Corner kicks	2	1
Fouls committed	6	4
Offsides	0	2
Yellow cards	5	0
Red cards	0	0

Overall
Statistic	Mamelodi Sundowns	Wydad AC
Goals scored	2	0
Total shots	8	3
Shots on target	3	1
Saves	1	1
Ball possession	60%	40%
Corner kicks	4	1
Fouls committed	9	9
Offsides	2	2
Yellow cards	5	2
Red cards	0	0
