= Teboho Mokoena (soccer, born 1997) =

South African soccer player (born 1997)

Personal information
- Full name: Teboho Michael Mokoena
- Date of birth: 24 January 1997 (age 29)
- Place of birth: Bethlehem, South Africa
- Height: 1.76 m (5 ft 9 in)
- Position: Midfielder

Team information
- Current team: Mamelodi Sundowns
- Number: 4

Youth career
- –2016: SuperSport United Academy

Senior career*
Years	Team	Apps	(Gls)
2016–2022	SuperSport United	127	(15)
2022–	Mamelodi Sundowns	107	(22)

International career^{‡}
2017	South Africa U20	6	(0)
2017–2019	South Africa B	4	(0)
2018	South Africa U23	5	(2)
2018–	South Africa	58	(10)
Medal record
Men's football
Representing South Africa
Africa Cup of Nations
Third place	2023 Ivory Coast
- * Club domestic league appearances and goals as of 20 September 2026 ‡ National team caps and goals as of 05:11, 3 October 2026 (UTC)

Teboho Michael Mokoena (born 24 January 1997) is a South African professional soccer player who plays as a midfielder for Premiership side Mamelodi Sundowns and the South Africa national team.

== Club career ==
During his schooling, Mokoena was discovered by Charles Molefe, a teacher doubling up as a soccer coach at Bodikela Junior Secondary School. His performances at school level earned him a sport at the Harmony Sports Academy from where he was picked up by SuperSport United.

=== SuperSport United ===
At SuperSport United, he progressed through the academy and later captained the club at U-19 level. He was promoted to the first-team in 2016 by Stuart Baxter and made his professional debut in February the following year, coming on as a late substitute for Cole Alexander in a 5–2 league win over Golden Arrows. In March 2017, after having become a regular feature in SuperSport United's midfield alongside Dean Furman and Reneilwe Letsholonyane, Mokoena was at the centre of a club-versus-country row when Baxter refused to release him for international duty for the 2017 FIFA U-20 World Cup due his commitment to the club's impending Nedbank Cup semi-final match. A compromise was ultimately reached between the two parties, which resulted in Mokoena being specially flown up to join his international teammates after SuperSport United confirmed their progression in the tournament. He returned in time for the final but was an unused substitute as the club beat Orlando Pirates 4–1 to claim the title. Before the final, he had also scored his first professional goal in a 2–2 CAF Confederations Cup draw with TP Mazembe.

The following season, Mokoena continued to feature regularly for SuperSport United. He managed two goals and two assists for the season, and, despite the club finishing a disappointing eighth in the league, he was nominated for the PSL Young Player of the Season award. On 13 March 2019, he was awarded the league's Goal of the Month award for January following his strike against Bloemfontein Celtic.

=== Mamelodi Sundowns ===
In January 2022, Mokoena transferred to Mamelodi Sundowns, a move widely regarded as one of the most significant domestic signings of the season. He immediately established himself as a key component of the Sundowns midfield, adding tactical maturity and long‑range shooting to the team’s structure. Mokoena’s performances earned him the PSL Footballer of the Season (2022/23) award, confirming his status as one of the league’s most influential players.

In the second leg of the 2025–26 CAF Champions League final, Mokoena scored a decisive half‑volley in first‑half stoppage time at the Prince Moulay Abdellah Stadium in Rabat. His strike, which crashed off the underside of the crossbar, restored Mamelodi Sundowns’ aggregate lead and shifted the momentum of the match. With the away‑goals rule in effect, AS FAR Rabat required two goals in the second half, allowing Sundowns to manage the remainder of the match and secure a 2–1 aggregate victory to claim their second continental title.

His impact was instrumental in Sundowns’ continued domestic dominance, contributing to three Premier Soccer League titles, the Nedbank Cup (2022), and continental campaigns including the CAF Champions League , African Football League, and the FIFA African–Asian–Pacific Cup where Sundowns emerged champions.

== International career ==
Mokoena is a former youth international for South Africa, having represented the country at Under-17 and Under-20 levels. With the Under-20 side, he was a regular during the qualifying campaign for the 2017 U-20 Africa Cup of Nations and was subsequently named in the 21-man squad for the tournament. He played in all four of South Africa's matches, including the 1–0 semi-final defeat to Zambia, but did not feature in the third-place play-off, which South Africa lost 2–1 to Guinea. Their semi-final appearance secured qualification for the 2017 FIFA U-20 World Cup. However, SuperSport United initially refused to release Mokoena for the tournament in South Korea, seeking to retain him for their upcoming Nedbank Cup semi-final. A compromise was eventually reached after SuperSport United progressed, allowing Mokoena to join the national team in South Korea. By the time he arrived, South Africa had already played their opening group match, so Mokoena featured in the remaining two matches as the team was eliminated in the group stage. He subsequently returned to SuperSport United in time to play in the Nedbank Cup final.

In July 2017, Mokoena received his first call-up to the senior national team by former SuperSport United manager Stuart Baxter, who had departed the club at the end of the 2016–17 domestic season, for the nation's 2018 African Nations Championship qualifiers. He made his debut on 15 July against Botswana and was praised following the match for his ability to "carry the team on his shoulders". The following year, he scored his first international goal in South Africa's 2019 Africa Cup of Nations qualification win over Seychelles. His goal also contributed towards the nation recording its largest ever victory with the match ending 6–0 in favour of South Africa. Mokoena was then considered by Baxter for the 2019 Africa Cup of Nations but was omitted from the provisional squad. He was instead sent to play in the 2019 COSAFA Cup. In the quarter-final against Botswana, he missed a penalty during the shoot-out after the first eight kicks had been converted, sending South Africa into the Plate competition. In the Plate final against Malawi, Mokoena converted his penalty during the shoot-out as South Africa won the competition.

Still eligible for the Under-23 team, Mokoena was called up later that year by David Notoane for the 2019 Africa U-23 Cup of Nations. In South Africa's opening match against Ivory Coast, he scored a free kick in a 1-0 victory. The result helped South Africa reach the semi-finals. Mokoena started all four of South Africa's matches at the tournament, with the team finishing third after defeating Ghana on penalties in the bronze medal match to qualify for the 2020 Summer Olympics.

Mokoena was subsequently selected for South Africa's squad at the 2020 Summer Olympics. He appeared in all three of South Africa's group-stage matches and scored in a 4–3 defeat to France. South Africa lost all three of their matches and was eliminated in the group stage.

Mokoena broke into the senior team under new head coach Hugo Broos during the 2022 FIFA World Cup qualification campaign. He made six appearances and scored twice as South Africa failed to qualify for the tournament. His first goal came in a 3-1 victory over Ethiopia on 9 October 2021, while his second was scored in the penultimate qualifying match, a 1-0 victory over Zimbabwe on 11 November, in which he was named man of the match. The result moved South Africa to the top of the group, leaving them needing only a draw against Ghana in the final match to secure a place in the play-offs. Mokoena played the full match as South Africa lost 1–0 in Cape Coast, ending their qualification campaign.

Mokoena remained an important member of the national team during the subsequent qualifying campaign, making three appearances as South Africa secured qualification for the 2023 Africa Cup of Nations. He was later named to the 23-man team to compete in the competition. Mokoena started each of South Africa’s three group-stage matches, providing an assist in the 4–0 victory over Namibia on 21 January 2024 as the team progressed to the knockout stage. He proved decisive in several knockout phase matches. In the round of 16, Mokoena scored a stoppage-time free kick against Morocco on 30 January to seal a 2–0 victory. He again played a crucial role against Cape Verde, converting South Africa’s opening penalty in the shoot-out after the match ended goalless following extra time. Bafana Bafana won the shoot-out 2–1, reaching the semi-finals for the first time since 2000.

Mokoena was later involved in a major scandal when he failed to serve one-match suspension in the 2026 FIFA World Cup qualification home match against Lesotho, which resulted in South Africa being handed a 3–0 walkover loss (having won 2–0 earlier). Nonetheless, thanked to favorable results earlier, South Africa were able to rebound and qualify for the 2026 FIFA World Cup.

On 1 December 2025, Mokoena was called up to the South Africa squad for the 2025 Africa Cup of Nations. Scoring the first goal in the tournament for the country.

Mokoena was included in South Africa's 26-man team for the 2026 FIFA World Cup. On June 18, he scored his first World Cup goal in their 1–1 tie against Czechia. Along the way, he created 5 chances, the joint-most by a South African player in a World Cup game, alongside Quinton Fortune in 2002.

== Career statistics ==
=== Club ===
As of match played 30 January 2024

Appearances and goals by club, season and competition
Club	Season	League			Nedbank Cup		Knockout Cup		Continental		Other		Total	
Club	Season	Division	Apps	Goals	Apps	Goals	Apps	Goals	Apps	Goals	Apps	Goals	Apps	Goals
SuperSport United	2016–17	Premiership	10	0	3	0	0	0	11 (Note: Appearances in CAF Confederation Cup)	1	0	0	24	1
SuperSport United	2017–18	Premiership	25	2	1	0	1	0	4	0	3 (Note: Appearances in MTN 8)	0	34	2
SuperSport United	2018–19	Premiership	28	3	1	0	2	0	0	0	3	0	34	3
SuperSport United	2019–20	Premiership	29	2	1	0	2	0	0	0	4	1	36	3
SuperSport United	2020–21	Premiership	22	4	0	0	0	0	0	0	3	0	25	4
SuperSport United	2021–22	Premiership	13	4	0	0	0	0	0	0	1	0	14	4
SuperSport United	Total		127	15	6	0	5	0	15	1	14	1	167	17
Mamelodi Sundowns	2021–22	Premiership	27	1	2	0	0	0	7 (Note: Appearances in CAF Champions League)	1	0	0	17	2
Mamelodi Sundowns	2022–23	Premiership	24	1	1	0	0	0	10	1	0	0	35	2
Mamelodi Sundowns	2023–24	Premiership	26	4	0	0	0	0	5	2	5	0	36	6
Mamelodi Sundowns	Total		77	6	3	0	0	0	22	4	5	0	107	10
Career total			203	21	9	0	5	0	37	5	19	1	254	23

=== International ===
As of match played 29 June 2026

Appearances and goals by national team and year
National team	Year	Apps	Goals
South Africa	2018	3	1
South Africa	2020	2	0
South Africa	2021	6	2
South Africa	2022	6	1
South Africa	2023	7	0
South Africa	2024	17	5
South Africa	2025	9	0
South Africa	2026	8	1
Total		58	10

Scores and results list South Africa's goal tally first, score column indicates score after each Mokoena goal.

List of international goals scored by Teboho Mokoena
No.	Date	Venue	Opponent	Score	Result	Competition	Ref.
1	13 October 2018	FNB Stadium, Johannesburg, South Africa	Seychelles	6–0	6–0	2019 Africa Cup of Nations qualification	
2	9 October 2021	Bahir Dar Stadium, Amhara Region, Ethiopia	Ethiopia	1–0	3–1	2022 FIFA World Cup qualification	
3	11 November 2021	FNB Stadium, Johannesburg, South Africa	Zimbabwe	1–0	1–0	2022 FIFA World Cup qualification	
4	27 September 2022	FNB Stadium, Johannesburg, South Africa	Botswana	1–0	1–0	Friendly	
5	30 January 2024	Laurent Pokou Stadium, San-Pédro, Ivory Coast	Morocco	2–0	2–0	2023 Africa Cup of Nations	
6	7 February 2024	Stade de la Paix, Bouaké, Ivory Coast	Nigeria	1–1	1–1 (a.e.t.)	2023 Africa Cup of Nations	
7	11 October 2024	Nelson Mandela Bay Stadium, Gqeberha, South Africa	Congo	1–0	4–0	2025 Africa Cup of Nations qualification	
8	11 October 2024	Nelson Mandela Bay Stadium, Gqeberha, South Africa	Congo	2–0	4–0	2025 Africa Cup of Nations qualification	
9	19 November 2024	Cape Town Stadium, Cape Town, South Africa	South Sudan	3–0	3–0	2025 Africa Cup of Nations qualification	
10	18 June 2026	Mercedes-Benz Stadium, Atlanta, United States	Czech Republic	1–1	1–1	2026 FIFA World Cup	

== Honours ==
SuperSport United

- Nedbank Cup: 2017
- MTN 8: 2019

Mamelodi Sundowns

- South African Premiership: 2021–22, 2022–23, 2023–24, 2024–25
- Nedbank Cup: 2021–22
- MTN 8: 2026
- Africa Football League: 2023
- CAF Champions League: 2025–26
- FIFA African–Asian–Pacific Cup: 2026

South Africa

- Africa Cup of Nations third place: 2023

Individual

- Africa Cup of Nations Team of the Tournament: 2023
- PSL Footballer of the season: 2023–24
