= Youssef El Motie =

Moroccan footballer (born 1994)

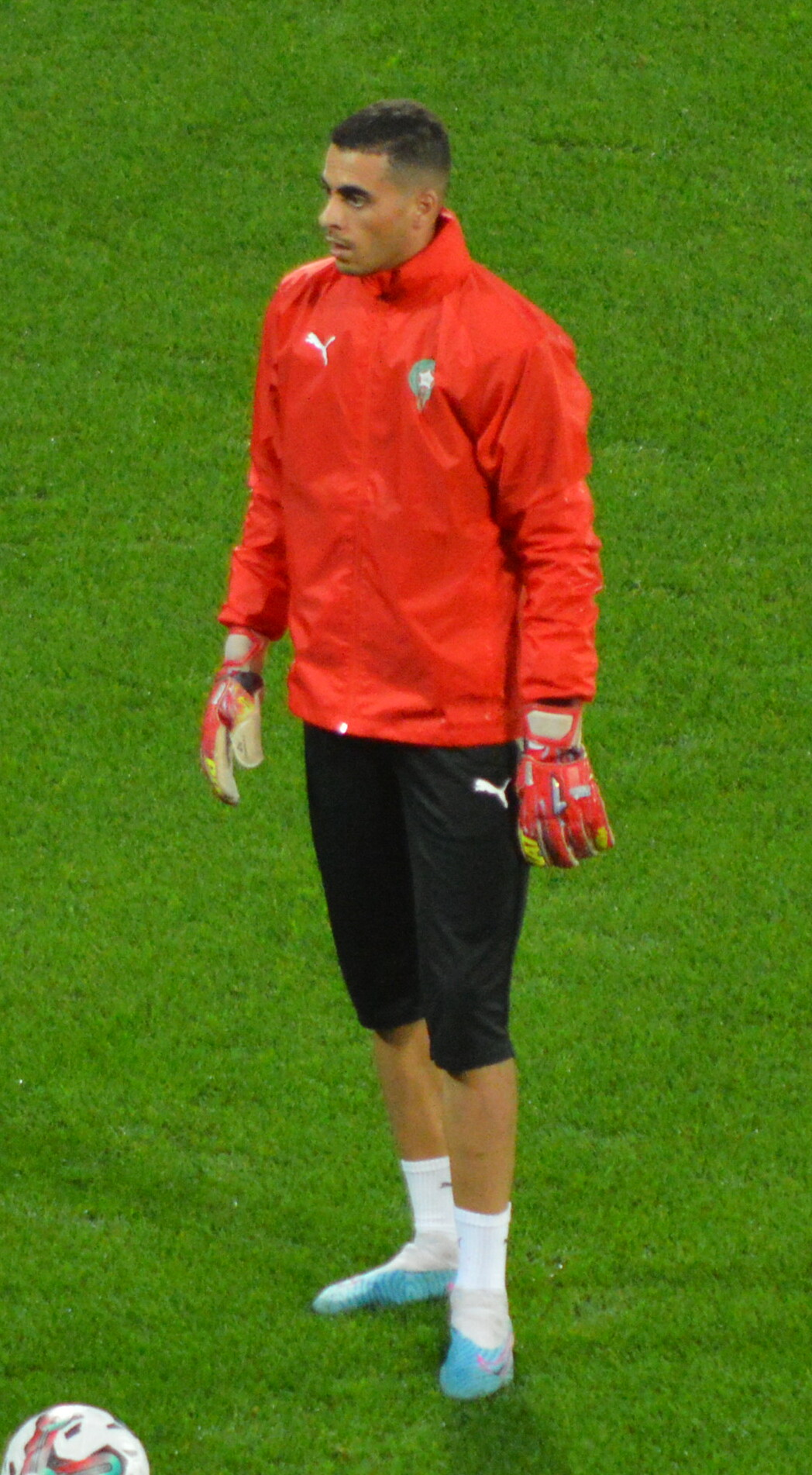
- El Motie in 2023

Personal information
- Full name: Youssef El Motie
- Date of birth: 16 December 1994 (age 31)
- Place of birth: Temara, Morocco
- Height: 1.93 m (6 ft 4 in)
- Position: Goalkeeper

Team information
- Current team: RS Berkane

Senior career*
| Years | Team | Apps | (Gls) |
| 2016–2020 | TAS de Casablanca | 3 | (0) |
| 2020–2022 | SCC Mohammédia | 42 | (0) |
| 2022–2026 | Wydad AC | 55 | (0) |
| 2026 | OC Safi | 10 | (0) |
| 2026– | RS Berkane | 0 | (0) |

International career
| 2023 | Morocco | 0 | (0) |
- * Club domestic league appearances and goals

Youssef El Motie (Arabic: يوسف المطيع; born 16 December 1994) is a Moroccan professional footballer who plays as a goalkeeper for Botola Pro club RS Berkane and the Morocco national team.

== Club career ==
On 1 November 2023, El Motie was nominated for the 2023 African Goalkeeper of the Year and 2023 Interclub Player of the Year Award by CAF.

== International career ==
In August 2023, El Motie was called up for the first time to join the Moroccan national team, for the upcoming games against Liberia and Burkina Faso.

== Personal life ==
On 9 September 2023, El Motie along with his national teammates donated their blood for the needy affected by the 2023 Marrakesh-Safi earthquake.

== Honours ==
TAS de Casablanca

- Moroccan Throne Cup: 2019

Wydad AC

- Botola Pro runner-up: 2022–23
- CAF Champions League runner-up: 2022-23
- African Football League runner-up: 2023
