= Marcelo Allende =

Chilean footballer (born 1999)

Personal information
- Full name: Marcelo Iván Allende Bravo
- Date of birth: 7 April 1999 (age 27)
- Place of birth: Pudahuel, Santiago, Chile
- Height: 1.65 m (5 ft 5 in)
- Position: Attacking midfielder

Team information
- Current team: Mamelodi Sundowns
- Number: 11

Youth career
- –2016: Cobreloa
- 2016: → Arsenal (loan)

Senior career*
Years	Team	Apps	(Gls)
2016–2017	Deportes Santa Cruz	34	(5)
2017–2018	Necaxa	12	(0)
2017	→ Deportes Santa Cruz (loan)	12	(2)
2019	Magallanes	11	(0)
2020–2022	Montevideo City Torque	77	(15)
2022–	Mamelodi Sundowns	74	(7)

International career^{‡}
2015–2017	Chile U17	4	(2)
2016–2019	Chile U20	11	(1)
2021	Chile	1	(0)
Medal record
Men's football
Representing Chile
South American Games
Gold medal – first place	2018 Cochabamba
- * Club domestic league appearances and goals as of 3 January 2026 ‡ National team caps and goals as of 25 July 2022

Marcelo Iván Allende Bravo (born 7 April 1999) is a Chilean professional footballer who plays as an attacking midfielder for Premier Soccer League side Mamelodi Sundowns. Allende captained Chile at the 2015 FIFA U-17 World Cup, being the team's top goalscorer in the tournament and was considered to be one of the top youth prospects in Chilean football.

== Club career ==
Allende started his youth career at Cobreloa. After Chile's participation in the U-17 World Cup, he caught the interest of Colo-Colo and Universidad de Chile for his signature, although neither move materialized.

In 2016, the player transferred to Deportes Santa Cruz of the Segunda División de Chile in order to gain more playing time, making his debut against Naval. In his second season at the team, he scored his first senior goal against Melipilla, and became a regular starter, finishing the campaign with four goals.

Allende had a two-month trial with English club Arsenal, featuring for their under-19 team at the Durban International Cup. The team won the competition, and the player was invited to further trials with the club. In April 2017, following a third trial, the English tabloid press reported that Arsenal had offered Allende a professional contract.

=== Necaxa ===
With this being so on 7 September 2017 Allende signed up with Mexican side Necaxa, with the intention of rejoining the club in 2018 while remaining on loan with Santa Cruz.

=== Mamelodi Sundowns ===
On 24 August 2022, Allende was announced as new player of South African club Mamelodi Sundowns in what was a record transfer fee of R51 million (€3 million) for a player in the South African Premiership and made his debut in the same day scoring a goal versus Stellebosch. He ended his maiden season with 19 appearances for the club scoring 2 goals and providing 2 assists to help them to the 2022–23 league title with his second goal being a much needed winner against Amazulu.

During the 2023–24 season, he continued to feature prominently in Sundowns’ possession‑based system under Rulani Mokwena. He recorded 2 goals and 3 assists in 18 league matches.

Allende enjoyed one of his productive creative campaigns in 2024–25, registering 2 goals and 4 assists in 24 league appearances as Sundowns secured another domestic title.He also featured in the African Football League, helping the club win the title.

In the 2025–26 season, Allende added 4 goals and 1 assist in 21 league matches, while continuing to play across multiple midfield and wide positions under Miguel Cardoso. His versatility, press resistance, and passing range made him a consistent starter as Sundowns won their second Champions League title.

== International career ==
On 15 June 2015, Allende made his debut for Chile U-17 in a friendly defeat against Paraguay. He was later selected on the list of players that would take part in the tournament, held on home soil. He was a starter on Chile's four matches at the U-17 World Cup, netting against Nigeria and the United States.

On 16 October 2016, Allende made his debut for the Chile U-20 in a friendly win against Paraguay U-20 adding another cap against Ecuador U-20, but was ultimately left out of the final squad for the 2017 South American Youth Football Championship. He scored his first goal for the U20's on 10 August 2017, in a friendly win against Japan.

At under-20 level, Allende represented Chile in both the 2018 South American Games, winning the gold medal, and the 2019 South American Championship.

Allende made his debut for Chile national team on 11 December 2021 in a 1–0 win over El Salvador.

== Statistics ==
- Updated to last played match: 19 May 2017.

Club	Div.	Season	League		Cups; National^{(1)}		Tournaments International^{(2)}		Total
Club	Div.	Season	Matches	Goals	Matches	Goals	Matches	Goals	Matches	Goals
Deportes Santa Cruz; Chile
Deportes Santa Cruz; Chile	2.ª	2015–16	9	0	-	-	-	-	9	0
Deportes Santa Cruz; Chile	2.ª	2016–17	22	4	-	-	-	-	22	4
Deportes Santa Cruz; Chile	Total club		31	4	0	0	0	0	31	4
Total in career			31	4	0	0	0	0	31	4

== Honours ==
Arsenal

- Durban International Cup: 2016

Necaxa

- Copa MX: Clausura 2018
- Supercopa MX: 2018

Mamelodi Sundowns

- South African Premiership: 2022–23, 2023–24 , 2024–25; runners-up: 2025–26
- African Football League: 2023
- CAF Champions League: 2025–26; runners-up: 2024–25
- FIFA African–Asian–Pacific Cup: 2026
- MTN 8: 2026

Chile U20
- South American Games Gold medal: 2018

Individual

- Uruguayan Primera División Team of the Year: 2020
