= Ronwen Williams =

South African soccer player (born 1992)

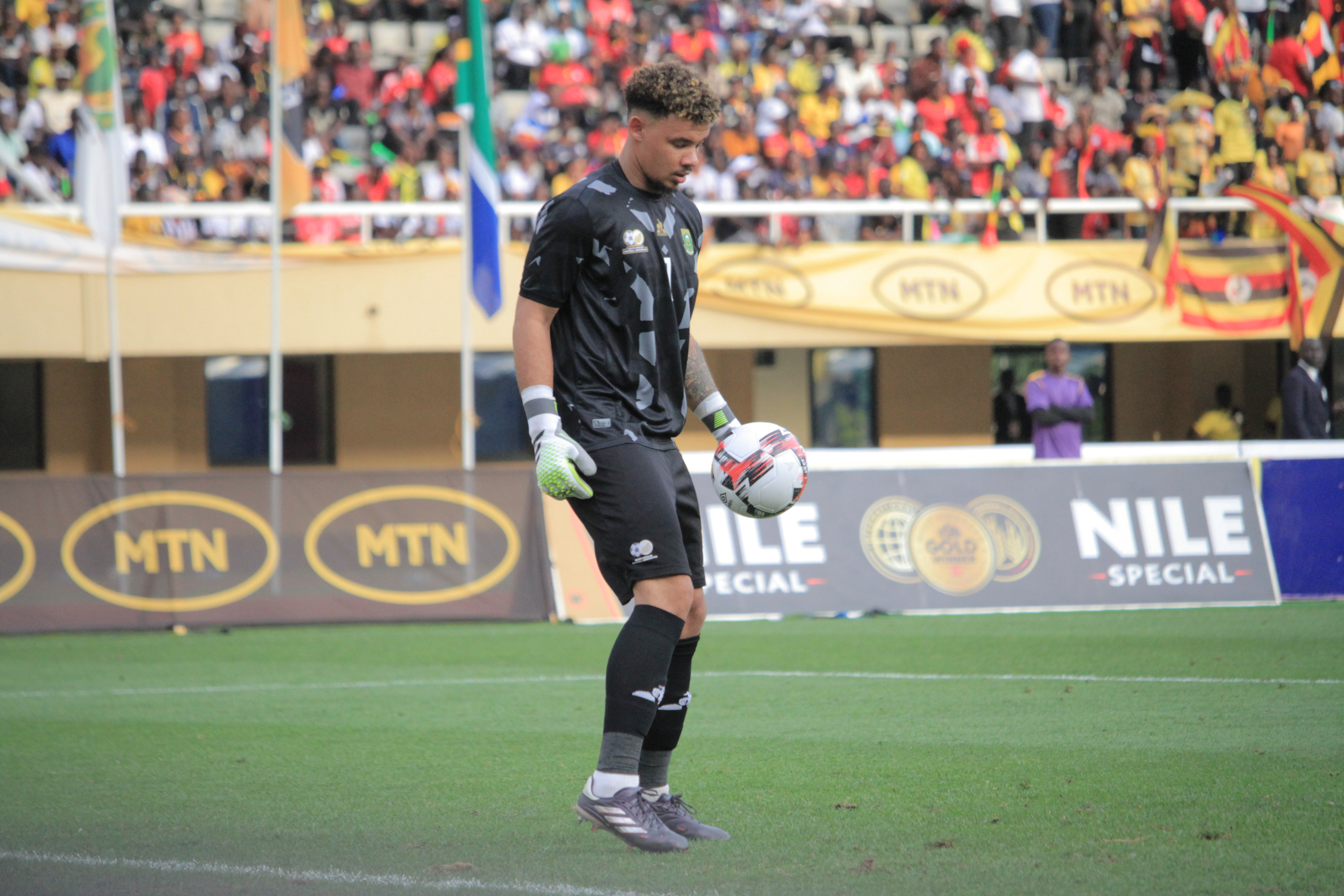
- Williams playing for South Africa in 2024

Personal information
- Full name: Ronwen Hayden Williams
- Date of birth: 21 January 1992 (age 34)
- Place of birth: Gqeberha, South Africa
- Height: 1.84 m (6 ft 0 in)
- Position: Goalkeeper

Team information
- Current team: Mamelodi Sundowns
- Number: 30

Youth career
- Shatterprufe Rovers
- Tottenham Hotspur
- SuperSport United

Senior career*
Years	Team	Apps	(Gls)
2010–2022	SuperSport United	278	(0)
2022–	Mamelodi Sundowns	91	(0)

International career^{‡}
2011	South Africa U20	2	(0)
2021	South Africa Olympic	3	(0)
2014–	South Africa	71	(0)
Medal record
Representing South Africa
Men's football
Africa Cup of Nations
Third place	2023 Ivory Coast
- * Club domestic league appearances and goals as of 3 January 2026 ‡ National team caps and goals as of 16:05, 4 October 2026 (UTC)

Ronwen Hayden Williams (born 21 January 1992) is a South African professional soccer player who plays as a goalkeeper for Premier Soccer League club Mamelodi Sundowns and captains the South Africa national team.

Williams was ranked the ninth-best goalkeeper in the world at the 2024 Ballon d'Or awards.

== Club career ==
=== Early career ===
Williams spent part of his youth career with Premier League club Tottenham Hotspur.

=== SuperSport United ===
Williams joined SuperSport United as a youth player in 2004. He made his debut in the CAF Champions League in January 2012 against Matlama FC, and in the PSL four months later against Free State Stars. He kept clean sheets in both games.

=== Mamelodi Sundowns ===
On 21 July 2022, Williams signed with Mamelodi Sundowns after a 12-year career at SuperSport United. He made his debut in the 2022–23 opener against Cape Town City FC where he made a string of great saves and kept a clean sheet. He won the African Football League with Mamelodi Sundowns in 2023 where he made two important penalties saves one against Al Ahly and the other one against CA Petróleos Luanda.

On 17 June 2025, Williams became the first player penalized under FIFA's new eight-second ball possession rule when he held onto the ball for 14 seconds. The rule was enforced for the first time during the FIFA Club World Cup match against South Korea's Ulsan Hyundai.

== International career ==
Williams represented South Africa at Under-20 level at the 2011 African Youth Championship, which was held on home soil. He played in two of South Africa's three group-stage matches, starting against Lesotho and Egypt. In the final group-stage match against Egypt, Williams committed a costly goalkeeping error when he sliced a clearance, allowing Mohamed Hamdy Zaky to lob him and score the winning goal. The 1–0 defeat resulted in South Africa's elimination from the tournament at the group stage.

Williams received his first senior call-up for the South Africa national team in March 2013 for the 2014 FIFA World Cup qualification match against the Central African Republic, but did not feature in the match. He earned his first full international cap the following year, on 5 March 2014, when he started in a friendly against Brazil after first-choice goalkeeper Itumeleng Khune suffered a sprained ankle. South Africa lost the match 5–0, with Williams in goal. Because of the heavy defeat, Williams made only one further appearance for Bafana Bafana over the following years, playing in South Africa's 0–0 draw against New Zealand a month after the Brazil game. In spite of winning the Telkom Knockout with Supersport United in 2014, he was not selected by Ephraim Mashaba for the 2015 Africa Cup of Nations. Later that year, Williams was recalled by Mashaba for friendly matches against Costa Rica and Honduras, but did not feature in either match. After further call-ups, he finally earned his third cap more than two years after his second, in a 1-1 friendly draw with Mozambique on 15 November 2016. The following year, on 1 September 2017, Williams made his competitive debut for South Africa in their opening 2018 FIFA World Cup qualifying match, a 2-1 defeat to Cape Verde. He did not feature for the remainder of the qualifying campaign as South Africa finished bottom of their group and failed to qualify for the World Cup.

Williams' international career took a significant turn in 2019 when a long-term injury ruled first-choice goalkeeper Itumeleng Khune out of the national team. South Africa head coach Stuart Baxter subsequently selected Williams ahead of Darren Keet and handed him the starting role at the 2019 Africa Cup of Nations in Egypt. Williams went on to establish himself as South Africa's first-choice goalkeeper, featuring in all of the team's matches except the group-stage match with Namibia, in which Keet started. South Africa were eliminated by Nigeria in the quarter-finals.

Baxter resigned after the tournament and was replaced by his assistant Molefi Ntseki. Under Ntseki, South Africa failed to qualify for the 2021 Africa Cup of Nations after losing their final qualifying match 2-0 to Sudan, when a draw would have been sufficient. Ntseki was subsequently dismissed, and Hugo Broos took over as head coach. Broos appointed Williams as captain as he began rebuilding the national team ahead of the 2022 FIFA World Cup qualification campaign. South Africa ultimately failed to qualify for the World Cup after finishing second in their group behind Ghana. The failure meant that Williams and South Africa would spend another World Cup on the sidelines, extending his wait for a first appearance at the tournament.

In 2021, Williams was selected as one of South Africa's overage players for the 2020 Summer Olympics in Tokyo. He played all three group stage matches in their entirety, as South Africa failed to progress to the knockout stage.

Williams continued as captain during South Africa's qualification campaign for the 2023 Africa Cup of Nations and helped the team secure qualification for the tournament. He was subsequently included in the squad for the finals in Ivory Coast. Williams entered the tournament in the best form of his career. Despite having a talented squad, South Africa were not among the bookmakers' favourites to go far in the competition. Williams helped defy those expectations by becoming the first South African goalkeeper to keep four consecutive clean sheets at the Africa Cup of Nations. He kept clean sheets in the group stage matches against Namibia, a 4-0 victory, and Tunisia, 0-0 draw, before keeping another against Morocco in the 2-0 round of 16. In the quarter-final against Cape Verde, Williams kept his fourth consecutive clean sheet as the match ended in a goalless draw after extra time. He then saved four penalties in the ensuing shootout, helping South Africa reach the semi-final for the first time since 2000. His four saves also set a record for the most penalties saved in an AFCON shootout. The semi-final against Nigeria ended 1-1 after extra time, with William Troost-Ekong's 67th minute penalty ending Williams' record of not conceding a goal at 451 consecutive minutes, setting a South African record for the longest run without conceding at the Africa Cup of Nations. In the ensuing shootout, he failed to save any of Nigeria's penalties as the Super Eagles prevailed. South Africa subsequently defeated the Democratic Republic of the Congo in the third-place play-off to finish third in the tournament, with Williams keeping another clean sheet. The feat set another South African record, as he became the first South African goalkeeper to keep five clean sheets in a single Africa Cup of Nations tournament.Williams was named the tournament's Best Goalkeeper and selected in the Team of the Tournament. His performances also earned him a nomination for the 2024 Yashin Trophy, awarded to the world's best goalkeeper. He finished ninth in the voting, becoming the first player based on the African continent to be nominated for the award.

Williams captained South Africa at the 2025 Africa Cup of Nations in Morocco, once again under Hugo Broos. The tournament proved more difficult for Williams than the previous edition, with his performances attracting criticism from the South African press alongside the team's overall displays. South Africa conceded six goals across their four matches and failed to keep a clean sheet. In the team's opening match, Williams made his 12th Africa Cup of Nations appearance in a 2-1 victory over Angola, equalling Andre Arendse's record for the most appearances by a South African goalkeeper in the competition. He then set a new record in the following match, a 1-0 defeat to Egypt. South Africa progressed to the round of 16, where their campaign ended with a 2-1 defeat to Cameroon.

Williams finally reached the FIFA World Cup in 2026, when the tournament was hosted by the United States, Canada and Mexico. He played a key role in South Africa's qualification campaign as they finished top of their group unbeaten. In the team's final match against Rwanda, Williams made his 16th appearance in World Cup qualifying, equalling Itumeleng Khune's record for a South African goalkeeper. He marked the occasion with a clean sheet as South Africa won 3-0 to secure their qualification for the 2026 World Cup, their first appearance at the tournament since hosting the 2010 edition.

On 28 May 2026, he was selected by manager Hugo Broos to represent his nation at the 2026 FIFA World Cup. Williams captained Bafana Bafana in their first World Cup match in 16 years, a 2-0 defeat to co-hosts Mexico. In their second match, a 1-1 draw with the Czech Republic, he helped South Africa earn their first point of the tournament. Williams completed 48 passes in the match, the second-most by a goalkeeper in a World Cup match at the time, behind Manuel Neuer's record of 51 completed passes set in 2022. On 25 June 2026, Williams became the second South African goalkeeper after Andre Arendse to keep a clean sheet at a World Cup, doing so in a 1-0 victory over South Korea. The result secured South Africa's place in the knockout stage as group runners-up. In the round of 32 against Canada, Williams set a new World Cup record for passes completed by a goalkeeper in a single match, completing 77 out of 85 passes at a 91% success rate, surpassing Manuel Neuer's previous record, although South Africa were eliminated following a 1–0 defeat.

Following Broos’ departure after the 2026 FIFA World Cup, Williams made his 70th appearance for South Africa, drawing level with Lucas Radebe as the nation’s joint-tenth most-capped player in Pitso Mosimane’s first match back as coach, a 2–1 home victory over Guinea in a 2027 Africa Cup of Nations qualifier.

== Career statistics ==
=== International ===
As of match played 28 June 2026

Appearances and goals by national team and year
National team	Year	Apps	Goals
South Africa	2014	2	0
South Africa	2016	1	0
South Africa	2017	2	0
South Africa	2018	1	0
South Africa	2019	7	0
South Africa	2020	3	0
South Africa	2021	9	0
South Africa	2022	5	0
South Africa	2023	6	0
South Africa	2024	14	0
South Africa	2025	10	0
South Africa	2026	11	0
Total		71	0

== Honours ==
Supersport United

- Nedbank Cup: 2011–12, 2015–16, 2016–17
- MTN 8: 2017, 2019
- Telkom Knockout: 2014

Mamelodi Sundowns

- South African Premier Division: 2022–23, 2023–24
- MTN 8: 2026
- Africa Football League: 2023
- CAF Champions League: 2025–26

South Africa

- Africa Cup of Nations third place: 2023

Individual

- PSL Footballer of the Season: 2023–24
- Africa Cup of Nations Best Goalkeeper: 2023
- Africa Cup of Nations Team of the Tournament: 2023
- African Football League Best Goalkeeper: 2023
- African Goalkeeper of the Year: 2024
- African Inter-Club Player of the Year: 2024
