= Mahmood Ismail =

Sudanese football referee

- Born: 1987 or 1988 (age 38–39); Sudan

Domestic
Years	League	Role
??–present	Sudan Premier League	Referee

International
Years	League	Role
2015–present	FIFA listed	Referee

Mahmood Ismail (Arabic: محمود إسماعيل; born 1987 or 1988) is a Sudanese football referee, who is a FIFA-listed international referee since 2015.

== Career ==
Ismail was born in Sudan in 1987 or 1988 and has become a prominent referee within the Confederation of African Football (CAF) since his promotion to international status by FIFA in 2015.

He has led important matches at club level in CAF tournaments, including the first leg final of the 2023 African Football League between Wydad AC and Mamelodi Sundowns F.C. in Casablanca and the first leg final of the 2024–25 CAF Champions League between Mameladi Sundowns F.C. and Pyramids FC at the Loftus Versfeld Stadium in Pretoria. In October 2025, Ismail oversaw the single game of the 2025 CAF Super Cup between Pyramids FC and RS Berkane in Cairo.

Within CAF, Ismail has also refereed national team matches, including at two Africa Cup of Nations (AFCON). In the 2023 edition, he was appointed for the group stage match between Equatorial Guinea and the Ivory Coast, the game of Senegal v. Cameroon, and the Round of 16 match between Morocco and South Africa. His second AFCON was the 2025 edition in Morocco, where he led the group stage game between South Africa and Angola and the round of 16 match of the Ivory Coast v. Burkina Faso. Other confederation competitions include the 2022 African Nations Championship, where he led the game between Mozambique and Algeria.

In other international competitions, Ismail officiates in CAF qualification for the FIFA World Cup, overseeing games in the CAF qualification for the 2026 FIFA World Cup. Ismail is an Olympics referee too, having refereed group stage matches between Iraq and Ukraine and the Dominican Republic and Uzbekistan at the 2024 Summer Olympics in Paris.

Ismail is known for his disciplinary approach during matches, showing readiness to issue yellow and red cards to sanction players. As of October 2025, he had a record of 120 cards shown in 40 international matches. He is usually assisted by Sudanese assistant referee Mohamed Abdallah and Ahmed Abdelrazik of Djibouti.

== Selected record ==
2023 Africa Cup of Nations
Date	Match	Venue	Round
19 January 2024	Senegal 3–1 Cameroon	Charles Konan Banny Stadium	Group stage
22 January 2024	Equatorial Guinea 4–0 Ivory Coast	Alassane Ouattara Stadium	Group stage
30 January 2024	Morocco 0–2 South Africa	Laurent Pokou Stadium	Round of 16
2024 Summer Olympics – Men's tournament
Date	Match	Venue	Round
24 July 2024	Iraq 2–1 Ukraine	Parc Olympique Lyonnais	Group stage
30 July 2024	Dominican Republic 1–1 Uzbekistan	Parc des Princes	Group stage
2025 Africa Cup of Nations
Date	Match	Venue	Round
22 December 2025	South Africa 2–1 Angola	Marrakesh Stadium	Group stage
6 January 2026	Ivory Coast 3–0 Burkina Faso	Marrakesh Stadium	Round of 16
