= Ayoub El Amloud =

Moroccan footballer (born 1994)

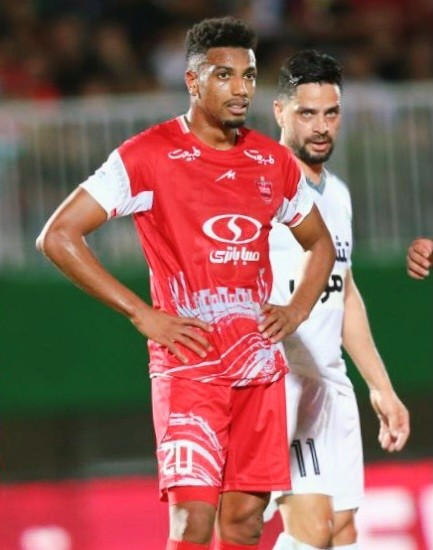
- Amloud with Persepolis in 2024

Personal information
- Full name: Ayoub El Amloud
- Date of birth: 8 April 1994 (age 32)
- Place of birth: Ouarzazate, Morocco
- Height: 1.78 m (5 ft 10 in)
- Position: Right-back

Team information
- Current team: Raja CA
- Number: 17

Youth career
- 2009–2013: FAR Rabat

Senior career*
Years	Team	Apps	(Gls)
2013–2018	FAR Rabat	44	(1)
2015–2016	→ Chabab Atlas Khénifra	13	(2)
2019–2024	Wydad AC	117	(9)
2024–2025	Persepolis	18	(1)
2025–2026	Al-Khaldiya	16	(1)
2026–	Raja CA	16	(4)

International career^{‡}
2021	Morocco	1	(0)
- * Club domestic league appearances and goals as of 13 September 2026 ‡ National team caps and goals as of 8 June 2021

Ayoub El Amloud (Arabic: أيوب العملود; born 8 April 1994) is a Moroccan professional footballer who plays as a right-back for Botola club Raja CA.

== Club career ==
=== AS FAR ===
In 2013, Amloud made it to the FAR club's first team and continued his success with brilliant performances in the following season.

=== Wydad ===
In the inaugural season of the African Football League, El Amloud went on to score the first goal in a 3–0 home victory against Nigerian side Enyimba, after claiming a 1–0 win away, thus qualifying them to the semi-finals.

=== Persepolis ===
On 16 July 2024, Amloud joined Persian Gulf Pro League champions Persepolis.

Amloud made his debut for the club on 15 August, in a 1–1 draw against Zob Ahan in Persian Gulf Pro League.

Amloud scored his first goal for Persepolis against Tractor on 22 August 2024.

== Style of play ==
In addition to defensive work, Amload also participates effectively in attack. Acceptable speed and the ability to create scoring opportunities are the main characteristics of his playing style. This caused Persepolis to sign a contract with him.

His ability to hit the last shot on the opponent's goal has been mentioned in the media.

== International career ==
El Amloud made his debut for Morocco national team on 8 June 2021 in a friendly against Ghana. He started the game and was substituted after 86 minutes in a 1–0 win.

On 28 December 2023, he was amongst the 27 players selected by coach Walid Regragui to represent Morocco in the 2023 Africa Cup of Nations.

== Career statistics ==
=== Club ===
As of 15 May 2025

Appearances and goals by club, season and competition
Club	Season	League			Cup		Continental		Other		Total	
Club	Season	Division	Apps	Goals	Apps	Goals	Apps	Goals	Apps	Goals	Apps	Goals
FAR Rabat	2013–14	Botola	1	0	0	0	—		—		1	0
FAR Rabat	2014–15	Botola	1	0	0	0	—		—		1	0
FAR Rabat	2016–17	Botola	21	0	0	0	—		—		21	0
FAR Rabat	2017–18	Botola	21	1	2	0	—		—		23	1
FAR Rabat	Total		44	1	2	0	—		—		46	1
Chabab Atlas Khénifra (loan)	2015–16	Botola 2	13	2	0	0	—		—		13	2
Wydad AC	2018–19	Botola	12	0	1	0	4	0	—		17	0
Wydad AC	2019–20	Botola	17	0	0	0	8	0	—		25	0
Wydad AC	2020–21	Botola	17	5	2	0	11	0	—		30	5
Wydad AC	2021–22	Botola	21	0	5	1	11	0	—		37	1
Wydad AC	2022–23	Botola	29	1	1	0	13	2	2	1	45	4
Wydad AC	2023–24	Botola	21	3	0	0	12	2	—		33	5
Wydad AC	Total		117	9	9	1	59	4	2	1	187	15
Persepolis	2024–25	Pro League	18	1	1	0	5	0	1	0	25	1
Career total			192	13	12	1	64	4	3	1	271	19

== Honours ==
Wydad AC

- Botola Pro: 2018–19, 2020–21, 2021–22
- CAF Champions League: 2021–22; runner-up 2018–19, 2022–23
- CAF Super Cup runner-up: 2022
- Moroccan Throne Cup runner-up: 2021–22
- African Football League runner-up: 2023
