= Jamal Harkass =

Moroccan footballer (born 1995)

Personal information
- Full name: Jamal Harkass
- Date of birth: 24 November 1995 (age 30)
- Place of birth: Figuig, Morocco
- Height: 1.86 m (6 ft 1 in)
- Position: Centre-back

Team information
- Current team: RS Berkane
- Number: 5

Youth career
- 2005-2006: AS Douanes Figuig
- 2006-2014: ES Oujda

Senior career*
| Years | Team | Apps | (Gls) |
| 2014-2016 | ES Oujda | 79 | (0) |
| 2016-2021 | MC Oujda | 68 | (0) |
| 2021–2023 | Raja CA | 43 | (3) |
| 2023–2025 | Wydad AC | 50 | (2) |
| 2025–2026 | Damac | 14 | (2) |
| 2026– | RS Berkane | 2 | (0) |

International career^{‡}
| 2020–2021 | Morocco A' | 5 | (0) |
| 2024– | Morocco | 4 | (1) |
- * Club domestic league appearances and goals as of 21 January 2026 ‡ National team caps and goals as of 21 March 2026

Jamal Harkass (Arabic: جمال حركاس; born 24 November 1995) is a Moroccan professional footballer who plays as a centre-back for Botola Pro club RS Berkane, and the Morocco national team.

Harkass joined the youth teams of ES Oujda in 2006 and reached the senior team in 2014 and playing in the Moroccan 4th Division. Two years later, moved to Mouloudia Club Oujda helping them achieve promotion to Botola in 2018. He then established himself as one of the league's best defenders and joined Raja CA in 2021 where he had been voted the club's best player in his first season.

== Early life ==
Jamal Harkass was born on 24 November 1995 in Figuig, an oasis town in eastern Morocco located near the Atlas Mountains, 368 km south of Oujda.

He started playing football with AS Douane Figuig, a sports club affiliated to the local customs, and exhibited his talent in tournaments played between amateur teams of the nearby cities.

== Club career ==
=== Debut ===
In 2006, he joined Etoile Sportive d'Oujda and began to travel to Oujda to train when he was only aged eleven. His parents did not let him leave Figuig fearing for his studies. Later, he will move to Oujda with his parents to combine school and football.

Jamal Harkass began his career as a striker then converted over time to a centre-back, where he would stand out the most. He passed through all the age categories and reaches the senior team in 2014, which was then playing in Amateurs 1, the 4th division of the Moroccan football.

At the end of the 2014–15 season, the team finished 10th of the Northeast Group. The following season, the team finished 7th.

=== MC Oujda ===
In 2016, he was noticed by Mouloudia Oujda and the club's president Khalid Bensaria offered him to join the club. He passed the test and began his professional career under Algerian coach Azzedine Aït Djoudi in Botola 2.

At the end of the 2017–18 season, the team won the league and earned promotion to Botola. He then became the second team captain after Abdellah Khafifi.

The 2020–21 season is very successful for Jamal Harkass as he delivers excellent performances and helped his team in achieving a historic fifth position in the ranking.

=== Raja CA ===
On 31 August 2021, Jamal Harkass joined Raja CA by signing a four-year contract. On 10 September, he made his debut during the first day of the 2021-22 Botola against Youssoufia Berrechid. He picked an injury and left the pitch at half-time (0–1 win).

On 20 October, he played against his former club, MC Oujda and was sent off at the end of the game. After that, he upped the pace and continued to perform well. On 22 December at the Ahmed bin Ali Stadium, Raja lost the 2021 CAF Supercup to Al Ahly SC on penalties after a 1–1 draw. On 18 March 2022, he delivered his first assist against Amazulu FC during a 2–0 Champions League win in Durban and allowed Iliass Haddad to score the first goal (0–2 win).

On 10 April, when Raja was losing 3–2 to Raja Beni Mellal in the Throne Cup, he equalized at the last minute and allowed his team to qualify for the quarter-finals. This was his first goal with the club. On 25 April, he assisted Soufiane Benjdida who scored the opener against MC Oujda (2–0 win).

On 5 May, he received the Eagle of the Month award that is given to the club's player of April 2022. In July, the fans chosen him as the Eagle of the season, which crowns the best player of the 2021–22 season.

On 4 September, he scored the equalizer against Olympique Club Safi in the opening game of the season.

=== Wydad AC ===
In the inaugural season of the African Football League, Harkass went on to score the second goal in a 3–0 home victory against Nigerian side Enyimba, after claiming a 1–0 win away, thus qualifying them to the semi-finals.

=== Damac ===
On 27 August 2025, Harkass joined Saudi Pro League club Damac.

== International career ==
In October 2020, he received his first selection with the Morocco A' national team against the Mali in a friendly match (2–0 victory).

== Honours ==
MC Oujda

- Botola Pro 2: 2017–18

Wydad AC

- African Football League runner-up: 2023

Individual

- Raja CA Player of the Year: 2021–22
- Botola Team of the Season: 2021–22
