= Amine Aboulfath =

Moroccan professional footballer

Personal information
- Full name: Amine Aboulfath
- Date of birth: 27 October 1997 (age 29)
- Place of birth: Morocco
- Height: 1.82 m (6 ft 0 in)
- Position: Centre-back

Team information
- Current team: Wydad AC
- Number: 4

Youth career
- Youssoufia Berrechid

Senior career*
Years	Team	Apps	(Gls)
2018–2020	Youssoufia Berrechid	34	(3)
2020–2024	Wydad AC	67	(1)
2024–2025	Kuwait SC	10	(0)
2025–	Wydad AC	0	(0)
- * Club domestic league appearances and goals

Amine Aboulfath is a Moroccan professional footballer who plays as a centre-back for Wydad AC.

== Club career ==
=== Wydad AC ===
On September 10, 2022, he was established under his new coach Hussein Ammouta on the occasion of the final of the CAF Super Cup against RS Berkane.

== Honours ==
Wydad AC

- Botola Pro: 2020–21, 2021–22
- CAF Champions League: 2021–22
- African Football League runner-up: 2023

Kuwait SC

- Kuwaiti Premier League: 2024–25
- Kuwait Crown Prince Cup: 2024–25
- Kuwait Super Cup: 2024–25
