= Abdelmounaim Boutouil =

Moroccan footballer (born 1998)

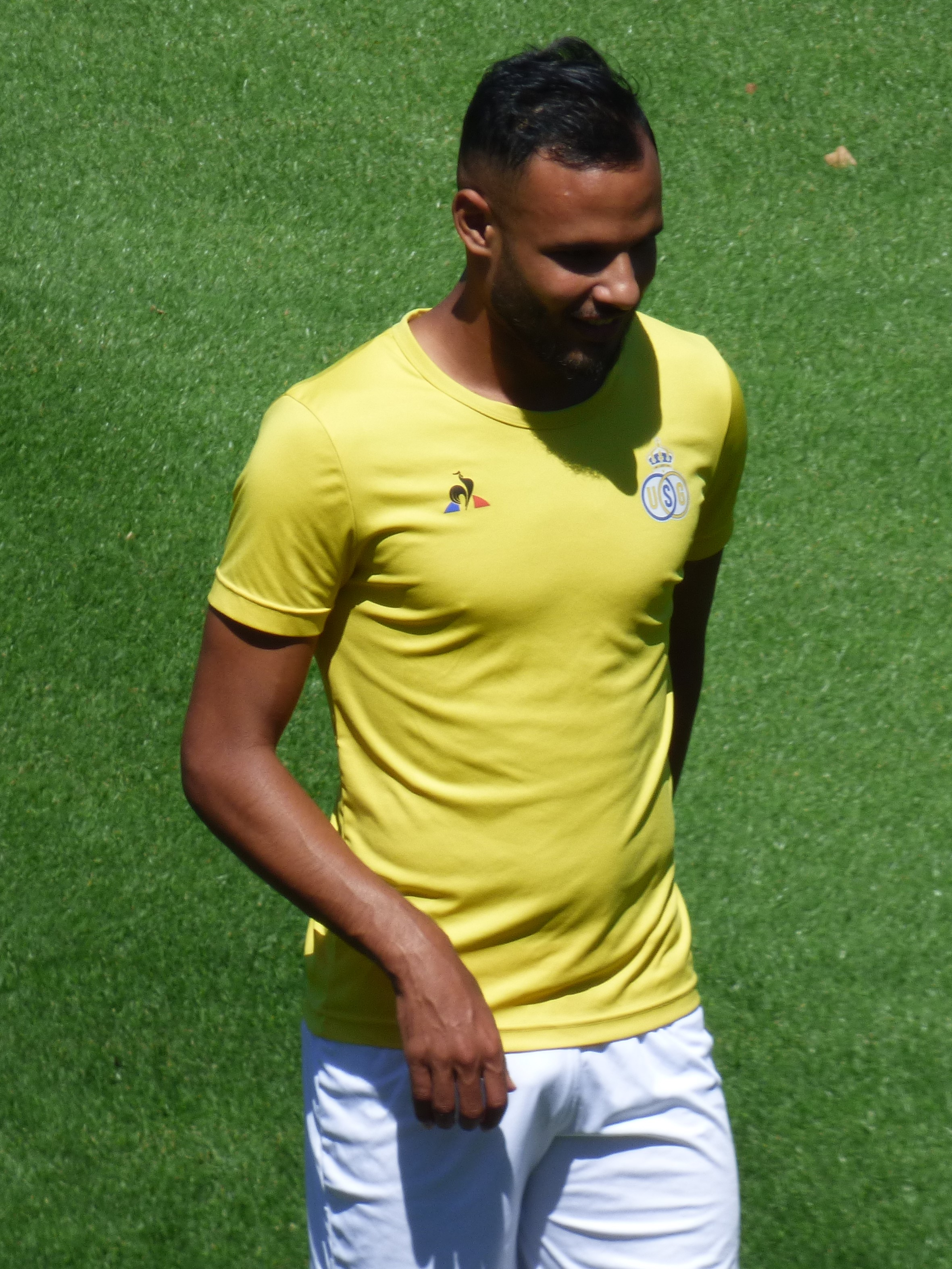
- Boutouil with Union SG in 2020

Personal information
- Full name: Abdelmounaim Boutouil
- Date of birth: 9 January 1998 (age 28)
- Place of birth: Benslimane, Morocco
- Height: 1.86 m (6 ft 1 in)
- Position: Centre-back

Team information
- Current team: psg

Youth career
- –2016: FAR Rabat

Senior career*
Years	Team	Apps	(Gls)
2016–2020	FAR Rabat	31	(1)
2017–2018	→ KAC Kénitra (loan)	10	(0)
2020–2021	Union SG	0	(0)
2020–2021	→ Mohammédia (loan)	25	(0)
2021–2022	Mohammédia	10	(1)
2022	→ Raja CA (loan)	0	(0)
2022–2024	Mamelodi Sundowns	12	(0)
2024–2025	Wydad AC	18	(1)
2025–2026	Al-Hazem	13	(0)
2026–	Kerala Blasters	0	(0)

International career^{‡}
2018–	Morocco U23	2	(1)
2021–	Morocco A'	7	(0)
Medal record
Men's football
Representing Morocco
African Nations Championship
Winner	2020 Cameroon
- * Club domestic league appearances and goals as of 30 June 2024 ‡ National team caps and goals as of 18:46, 25 April 2020 (UTC)

Abdelmounaim Boutouil (Arabic: عبد المنعم بوطويل; born 9 January 1998) is a Moroccan professional footballer

== Career ==
On 5 November 2023, Boutouil scored his first African Football League goal in the 2023 African Football League first-leg final against Wydad AC.

On 9 September 2025, Boutouil joined Saudi Pro League club Al-Hazem.

== Career statistics ==
=== Club ===
As of 7 December 2020.

Appearances and goals by club, season and competition
Club	Season	League			Cup		Other		Total	
Club	Season	Division	Apps	Goals	Apps	Goals	Apps	Goals	Apps	Goals
FAR Rabat	2019–20	Botola	8	0	0	0	0	0	8	0
Union SG	2020–21	Proximus League	0	0	0	0	0	0	0	0
Mohammédia (loan)	2020–21	Botola	1	0	0	0	0	0	1	0
Career total			9	0	0	0	0	0	9	0

== Honours ==
Mamelodi Sundowns

- South African Premiership: 2022–23, 2023–24
- African Football League: 2023

Morocco

- African Nations Championship: 2020

Individual

- African Nations Championship Team of the Tournament: 2020
