= Hamza Regragui =

Moroccan footballer (born 1997)

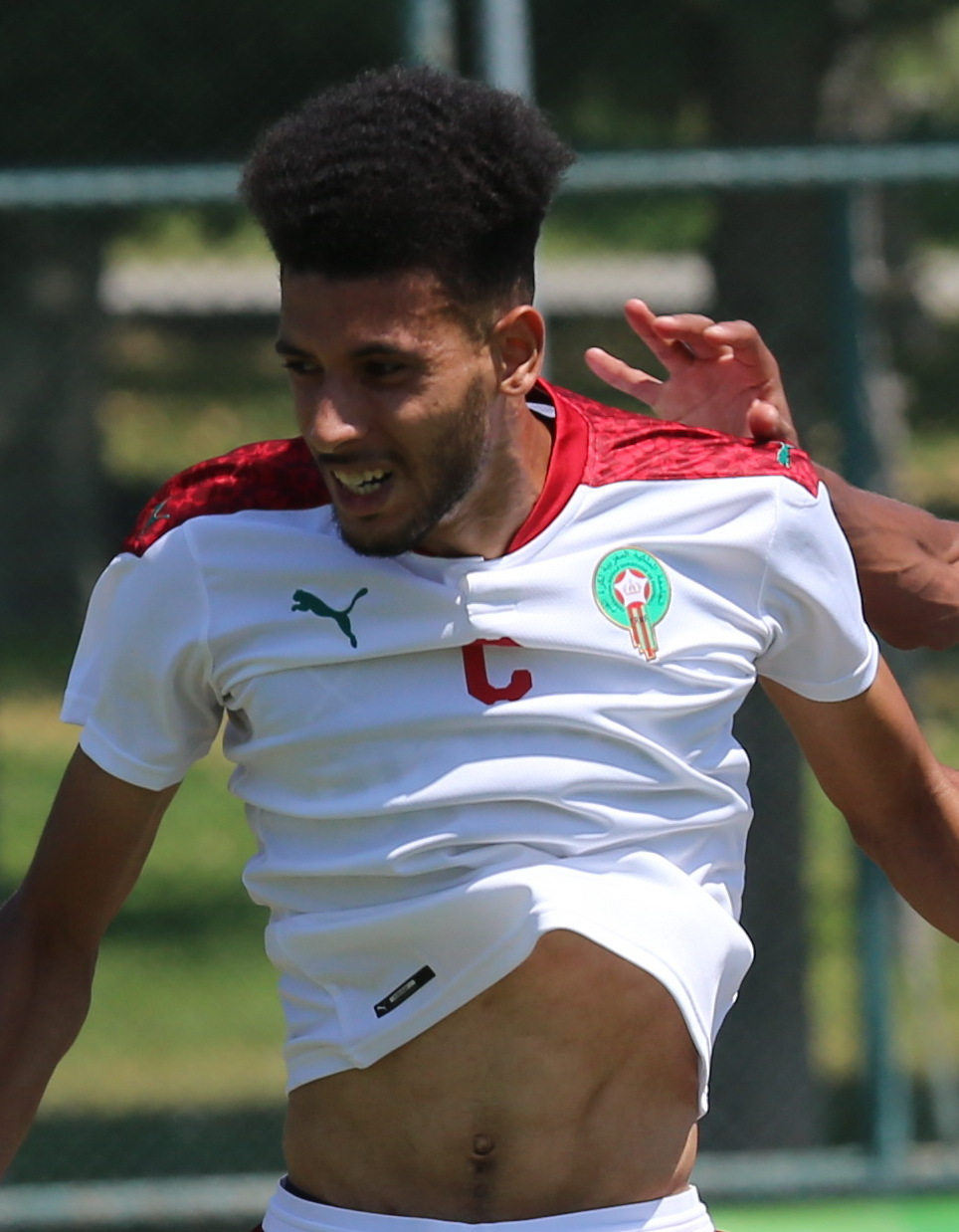
- Regragui playing for Morocco U23 in 2022

Personal information
- Full name: Hamza Regragui
- Date of birth: 13 June 1997 (age 29)
- Place of birth: Casablanca, Morocco
- Height: 1.90 m (6 ft 3 in)
- Positions: Centre-back; defensive midfielder

Youth career
- –2017: Mohammed VI Academy
- 2015–2016: → Málaga CF (loan)

Senior career*
Years	Team	Apps	(Gls)
2016–2017	→ Kénitra AC (loan)	1	(0)
2017–2023	RS Berkane	123	(7)
2023–2024	Wydad AC	3	(0)
2024–2025	NorthEast United	18	(0)

International career^{‡}
2017	Morocco U20	4	(0)
2022	Morocco U23	2	(1)
2022	Morocco A'	1	(0)
- * Club domestic league appearances and goals as of 13:20, 3 February 2025 (UTC) ‡ National team caps and goals as of 20 August 2022

Hamza Regragui (Arabic: حمزة الركراكي; born 13 June 1997) is a Moroccan professional footballer who plays as a centre-back or defensive midfielder.

== Club career ==
Regragui began his career at the Mohammed VI Football Academy in Morocco. In 2015, he joined Spanish club Málaga CF on loan, where he spent a season with the cub's under-19 side. He was later loaned out to Kénitra AC.

On 14 May 2017, he made his debut and only appearance for Kénitra as an 80th-minute substitute against Difaâ Hassani El Jadidi in a 1–2 defeat in the Botola.

=== RS Berkane ===
In 2017, Regragui signed for Botola club RS Berkane. He scored a hat-trick in the 2017 Moroccan Throne Cup quarter-finals against JS Kasbah Tadla. He played 24 matches in the 2017–18 Botola and six matches in the 2018 CAF Confederation Cup as the club reached quarter-finals.

On 18 November 2018, he won the 2018 Moroccan Throne Cup. On 25 October 2020, Regragui came in as a 92nd-minute substitute in the 2020 CAF Confederation Cup final as RS Berkane won the cup.

On 29 July 2022, Berkane defeated Wydad AC on penalties in the 2020–21 Moroccan Throne Cup finals, as Regragui won his second Throne Cup title. On 20 May 2022, Berkane won the 2022 CAF Confederation Cup final against Orlando Pirates on penalties as Regragui came on as an 80th-minute substitute. On 10 September 2022, Berkane won the 2022 CAF Super Cup 2–0 against Wydad AC.

=== Wydad AC ===
On 24 July 2023, Regragui joined Wydad AC on a free transfer. He made his debut in a 2–0 defeat against FUS Rabat in the Botola. On 9 January 2024, he was released by Wydad, having only made three appearance for the club.

=== NorthEast United ===
On 12 January 2024, Indian Super League club NorthEast United announced the signing of Regragui on a one-and-a-half-year contract. On 15 January, he made his debut for NorthEast as a 46th-minute substitute in a 2–1 win over Shillong Lajong in the 2024 Super Cup. On 31 January, he made his ISL debut in a 1–1 away draw against Jamshedpur FC.

== International career ==
On 18 August 2019, Regragui was called up by Patrice Beaumelle to the Morocco national under-23 team squad for the 2019 U-23 Africa Cup of Nations qualification final round matches against Mali U23. On 28 July 2022, he was called up by Hicham Dmiai to the Moroccan squad for the 2021 Islamic Solidarity Games as an overage player. Regragui scored his first international goal on 12 August 2022 against Azerbaijan U23 at the games. On 20 August 2022, Regragui made his Morocco A' national team debut against Qatar in a friendly.

== Career statistics ==
=== Club ===
As of match played 3 February 2025

Club	Season	League			National cup (Note: Includes Moroccan Throne Cup, Super Cup, Durand Cup)		Continental		Total	
Club	Season	Division	Apps	Goals	Apps	Goals	Apps	Goals	Apps	Goals
Kénitra AC (loan)	2016–17	Botola	1	0	—		—		1	0
RS Berkane	2017–18	Botola	24	0	6	3	5 (Note: Appearances in CAF Confederation Cup)	0	35	3
RS Berkane	2018–19	Botola	17	1	1	0	6	0	24	1
RS Berkane	2019–20	Botola	13	1	0	0	1	0	14	1
RS Berkane	2020–21	Botola	21	1	0	0	5	1	26	1
RS Berkane	2021–22	Botola	25	3	2	0	12	1	39	4
RS Berkane	2022–23	Botola	23	1	1	0	5 (Note: Four appearances in CAF Confederation Cup, one appearance in CAF Super Cup)	0	29	1
RS Berkane	Total		123	7	10	3	34	2	167	12
Wydad AC	2023–24	Botola	3	0	0	0	—		3	0
NorthEast United	2023–24	Indian Super League	7	0	2	0	—		9	0
NorthEast United	2024–25	Indian Super League	11	0	6	0	—		17	0
NorthEast United	Total		18	0	8	0	0	0	26	0
Career total			145	7	18	3	34	2	197	12

=== International ===
Appearances and goals by national team and year
National team	Year	Apps	Goals
Morocco A'
Morocco A'	2022	1	0
Total		1	0

== Honours ==
RS Berkane

- Moroccan Throne Cup: 2018, 2021–22
- CAF Confederation Cup: 2019–20, 2021–22; runner-up: 2018–19
- CAF Super Cup: 2022; runner-up: 2021

NorthEast United

- Durand Cup: 2024
