= 2023 African Football League =

Tournament details
- Dates: 20 October – 12 November 2023
- Teams: 8 (from 8 associations)

Final positions
- Champions: (South Africa) Mamelodi Sundowns (1st title)
- Runners-up: (Morocco) Wydad AC

Tournament statistics
- Matches played: 14
- Goals scored: 24 (1.71 per match)
- Attendance: 547,000 (39,071 per match)
- Top scorer(s): (South Africa) Thapelo Maseko (Egypt) Mahmoud Kahraba (Mali) Sadio Kanouté (2 goals each)
- Best player: (South Africa) Thapelo Maseko
- Best goalkeeper: (South Africa) Ronwen Williams

The 2023 African Football League was the first and only edition of Africa's international club football tournament, the African Football League, organized by the Confederation of African Football (CAF).

This season was meant to be a precursor tournament to the full fledged version, which will start in the 2024–25 season, after being delayed a year.

== Background ==
The competition, initially announced in 2022 as the Africa Super League, was to involve 24 teams divided into three geographical regions and have a promotion-relegation system. The competition was delayed from August to October 2023, renamed to the African Football League, and revised into an eight-team knockout format for its inaugural season. This season was meant to be a precursor, as the originally announced format was supposed to be introduced starting in 2024–25, though this was later cancelled.

== Schedule ==
The schedule was as follows.

Round	Draw date	First leg	Second leg
Quarter-finals	2 September 2023	20–22 October 2023	24–25 October 2023
Semi-finals	2 September 2023	29 October 2023	1 November 2023
Final	2 September 2023	5 November 2023	12 November 2023

== Format ==
Each tie was played over two legs, with each team playing one leg at home. The team that scored more goals on aggregate over the two legs advanced to the next round. If the aggregate score was level, the away goals rule was applied, i.e. the team that scored more goals away from home over the two legs advanced. If away goals were also equal, then extra time was not played and the winners were decided by a penalty shoot-out.

== Teams ==
The African Football League involved 8 teams chosen by the CAF to enter the tournament.

Location of teams of the 2023 African Football League

Pot 2	Pot 1
(Angola) Petro de Luanda; (Democratic Republic of the Congo) TP Mazembe; (Nigeria) Enyimba; (Tanzania) Simba	(Egypt) Al Ahly; (Morocco) Wydad AC; (South Africa) Mamelodi Sundowns; (Tunisia) Espérance de Tunis

== Bracket ==
The bracket was decided after the draw for the knockout stage (quarter-finals, semi-finals and final), which was held on 2 September 2023, 16:00 GMT (19:00 local time, UTC+3), at the CAF headquarters in Cairo, Egypt.

Quarter-finals
(Nigeria) Enyimba	0	0	0
(Morocco) Wydad AC	1	3	4
(Democratic Republic of the Congo) TP Mazembe	1	0	1
(Tunisia) Espérance de Tunis	0	3	3
(Angola) Petro de Luanda	0	0	0
(South Africa) Mamelodi Sundowns	2	0	2
(Tanzania) Simba	2	1	3
(Egypt) Al Ahly (a)	2	1	3

Semi-finals
(Morocco) Wydad AC (p)	1	0	1 (5)
(Tunisia) Espérance de Tunis	0	1	1 (4)
(South Africa) Mamelodi Sundowns	1	0	1
(Egypt) Al Ahly	0	0	0

Final
(Morocco) Wydad AC	2	0	2
(South Africa) Mamelodi Sundowns	1	2	3

== Quarter-finals ==
The first legs were played on 20, 21 and 22 October, and the second legs were played on 24 and 26 October 2023.

Team 1	Agg.	Team 2	1st leg	2nd leg
Simba (Tanzania)	3–3 (a)	(Egypt) Al Ahly	2–2	1–1
TP Mazembe (Democratic Republic of the Congo)	1–3	(Tunisia) Espérance de Tunis	1–0	0–3
Enyimba (Nigeria)	0–4	(Morocco) Wydad AC	0–1	0–3
Petro de Luanda (Angola)	0–2	(South Africa) Mamelodi Sundowns	0–2	0–0

20 October 2023
18:00 UTC+3

Simba (Tanzania)	2–2	(Egypt) Al Ahly
Denis 53'; Kanouté 59'	Report	Slim 45+1'; Kahraba 63'

Benjamin Mkapa Stadium, Dar es Salaam
Attendance: 60,000
Referee: Dahane Beida (Mauritania)
24 October 2023
17:00 UTC+3

Al Ahly (Egypt)	1–1	(Tanzania) Simba
Kahraba 76'	Report	Kanouté 68'

Cairo International Stadium, Cairo
Attendance: 30,000
Referee: Jean-Jacques Ndala Ngambo (DR Congo)

3–3 on aggregate. Al Ahly won on away goals.

22 October 2023
18:00 UTC+3

TP Mazembe (Democratic Republic of the Congo)	1–0	(Tunisia) Espérance de Tunis
Fofana 11'	Report

Benjamin Mkapa Stadium, Dar es Salaam (Tanzania)
Attendance: 40,000
Referee: Mahmood Ismail (Sudan)
26 October 2023
16:00 UTC+1

Espérance de Tunis (Tunisia)	3–0	(Democratic Republic of the Congo) TP Mazembe
Ouahabi 45'; Bouguerra 76'; Tougai 86'	Report

Stade Hammadi Agrebi, Tunis
Attendance: 40,000
Referee: Abongile Tom (South Africa)

Espérance de Tunis won 3–1 on aggregate.

22 October 2023
19:00 UTC+1

Enyimba (Nigeria)	0–1	(Morocco) Wydad AC
	Report	Jabrane 39' (pen.)

Godswill Akpabio International Stadium, Uyo
Attendance: 5,000
Referee: Alhadi Allaou Mahamat (Chad)
26 October 2023
19:00 UTC+1

Wydad AC (Morocco)	3–0	(Nigeria) Enyimba
El Amloud 4'; Harkass 38'; Attiyat Allah 43'	Report

Stade Mohammed V, Casablanca
Attendance: 45,000
Referee: Pierre Atcho (Gabon)

Wydad AC won 4–0 on aggregate.

21 October 2023
16:30 UTC+1

Petro de Luanda (Angola)	0–2	(South Africa) Mamelodi Sundowns
	Report	Allende 67'; Maseko 80'

Estádio 11 de Novembro, Luanda
Attendance: 42,000
Referee: Ibrahim Mutaz (Libya)
24 October 2023
19:00 UTC+2

Mamelodi Sundowns (South Africa)	0–0	(Angola) Petro de Luanda
	Report

Loftus Versfeld Stadium, Pretoria
Attendance: 25,000
Referee: Mustapha Ghorbal (Algeria)

Mamelodi Sundowns won 2–0 on aggregate.

== Semi-finals ==
The first legs were played on 29 October, and the second legs were played on 1 November 2023.

Team 1	Agg.	Team 2	1st leg	2nd leg
Mamelodi Sundowns (South Africa)	1–0	(Egypt) Al Ahly	1–0	0–0
Wydad AC (Morocco)	1–1 (5–4 p)	(Tunisia) Espérance de Tunis	1–0	0–1

29 October 2023
15:00 UTC+2

Mamelodi Sundowns (South Africa)	1–0	(Egypt) Al Ahly
Maseko 52'	Report

Loftus Versfeld Stadium, Pretoria
Attendance: 30,000
Referee: Djindo Louis Houngnandande (Benin)
1 November 2023
20:00 UTC+2

Al Ahly (Egypt)	0–0	(South Africa) Mamelodi Sundowns
	Report

Cairo International Stadium, Cairo
Attendance: 50,000
Referee: Issa Sy (Senegal)

Mamelodi Sundowns won 1–0 on aggregate.

29 October 2023
19:00 UTC+1

Wydad AC (Morocco)	1–0	(Tunisia) Espérance de Tunis
Boussefiane 58'	Report

Stade Mohammed V, Casablanca
Attendance: 45,000
Referee: Amin Omar (Egypt)
1 November 2023
16:00 UTC+1

Espérance de Tunis (Tunisia)	1–0	(Morocco) Wydad AC
Rodrigues 66'	Report
Penalties
Meriah (penalty scored); Rodrigues (penalty missed); Derbali (penalty scored); Bouchniba (penalty scored); Tougai (penalty scored)	4–5	(penalty scored) Jabrane; (penalty scored) El Amloud; (penalty scored) Aboulfath; (penalty scored) Ounajem; (penalty scored) Sambou

Stade Hammadi Agrebi, Tunis
Attendance: 40,000
Referee: Peter Waweru (Kenya)

1–1 on aggregate. Wydad AC won 5–4 on penalties.

== Final ==
The first leg was played on 5 November, and the second leg was played on 12 November 2023.

Team 1	Agg.	Team 2	1st leg	2nd leg
Wydad AC (Morocco)	2–3	(South Africa) Mamelodi Sundowns	2–1	0–2

5 November 2023
19:00 UTC+1

Wydad AC (Morocco)	2–1	(South Africa) Mamelodi Sundowns
Coetzee 41' (o.g.); Serrhat 78'	Report	Boutouil 74' (pen.)

Stade Mohammed V, Casablanca
Attendance: 45,000
Referee: Mahmood Ismail (Sudan)
12 November 2023
15:00 UTC+2

Mamelodi Sundowns (South Africa)	2–0	(Morocco) Wydad AC
Shalulile 45+3'; Modiba 53'	Report

Loftus Versfeld Stadium, Pretoria
Attendance: 50,000
Referee: Jean-Jacques Ndala Ngambo (DR Congo)

Mamelodi Sundowns won 3–2 on aggregate.

== Top goalscorers ==
Team eliminated / inactive for the round.

Rank	Player	Team	QF1	QF2	SF1	SF2	F1	F2	Total
1	(South Africa) Thapelo Maseko	(South Africa) Mamelodi Sundowns	1		1				2
1	(Egypt) Mahmoud Kahraba	(Egypt) Al Ahly	1	1					2
1	(Mali) Sadio Kanouté	(Tanzania) Simba	1	1					2
4	(Morocco) Yahia Attiyat Allah	(Morocco) Wydad AC		1					1
4	(Morocco) Hicham Boussefiane	(Morocco) Wydad AC			1				1
4	(Morocco) Ayoub El Amloud	(Morocco) Wydad AC		1					1
4	(Morocco) Jamal Harkass	(Morocco) Wydad AC		1					1
4	(Morocco) Yahya Jabrane	(Morocco) Wydad AC	1						1
4	(Morocco) Anas Serrhat	(Morocco) Wydad AC					1		1
4	(Chile) Marcelo Allende	(South Africa) Mamelodi Sundowns	1						1
4	(Morocco) Abdelmounaim Boutouil	(South Africa) Mamelodi Sundowns					1		1
4	(Namibia) Peter Shalulile	(South Africa) Mamelodi Sundowns						1	1
4	(South Africa) Aubrey Modiba	(South Africa) Mamelodi Sundowns						1	1
4	(Morocco) Reda Slim	(Egypt) Al Ahly	1						1
4	(Algeria) Mohamed Amine Tougai	(Tunisia) Espérance de Tunis		1					1
4	(Brazil) Rodrigo Rodrigues	(Tunisia) Espérance de Tunis				1			1
4	(Tunisia) Oussama Bouguerra	(Tunisia) Espérance de Tunis		1					1
4	(Tunisia) Ghaith Ouahabi	(Tunisia) Espérance de Tunis		1					1
4	(Mali) Cheick Oumar Abdallah Fofana	(Democratic Republic of the Congo) TP Mazembe	1						1
4	(Tanzania) Kibu Denis	(Tanzania) Simba	1						1

== See also ==
- 2023–24 CAF Champions League
- 2023–24 CAF Confederation Cup
- 2023 CAF Women's Champions League
