= Anas Serrhat =

Moroccan professional footballer

Personal information
- Date of birth: 1 November 1996 (age 30)
- Place of birth: Morocco
- Height: 1.78 m (5 ft 10 in)
- Position: Midfielder

Team information
- Current team: Wydad AC
- Number: 6

Youth career
- DH Jadida

Senior career*
Years	Team	Apps	(Gls)
2017–2018	DH Jadida		
2018–2020	Renaissance Zemamra		
2020–	Wydad AC		
2022–2023	→ MC Oujda (loan)		
- * Club domestic league appearances and goals as of 18 April 2020

Anas Serrhat (Arabic: أنس سرغات) is a Moroccan professional footballer who plays as a midfielder for Wydad AC.

== Career ==
He started his career playing for DH Jadida and Renaissance Zemamra, before joining Wydad AC in 2020.

On 5 November 2023, Serrhat scored his first African Football League goal in the 2023 African Football League first-leg final against Mamelodi Sundowns, claiming a 2–1 victory.
