= Hicham Boussefiane =

Moroccan footballer (born 1998)

Personal information
- Full name: Hicham Boussefiane
- Date of birth: 9 January 1998 (age 28)
- Place of birth: Rabat, Morocco
- Height: 1.77 m (5 ft 10 in)
- Position: Winger

Team information
- Current team: Marbella
- Number: 11

Youth career
- Mohammed VI Academy
- 2016–2018: Málaga

Senior career*
Years	Team	Apps	(Gls)
2017–2019	Málaga B	44	(12)
2018–2022	Málaga	43	(3)
2022–2024	Wydad AC	29	(2)
2024–2025	AS FAR	5	(1)
2025–	Marbella	5	(0)

International career
2017–2018	Morocco U20	6	(0)
2018	Morocco U23	1	(0)
- * Club domestic league appearances and goals as of 30 November 2025

Hicham Boussefiane (born 9 January 1998), simply known as Hicham, is a Moroccan footballer who plays as a right winger for Spanish Primera Federación club Marbella. He began his professional career playing for Spanish side Malaga B.

== Club career ==
Having joined Málaga CF's youth setup in 2016 from Mohammed VI Football Academy, Rabat-born Hicham made his senior debut with the former's reserves on 27 August 2017, playing the last 32 minutes in a 1–0 Tercera División home win against CD Huétor Vega. He scored his first goal on 15 October, netting the winner in a 3–2 home defeat of Linares Deportivo.

Hicham made his first-team debut on 18 August 2018, coming on as a second-half substitute for Renato Santos in a 2–1 away win against CD Lugo in the Segunda División championship. He scored his first professional goal on 15 September, netting the last in a 3–0 home defeat of Córdoba CF.

On 27 August 2025, Boussefiane signed for Spanish Primera Federacion club Marbella FC.

=== Wydad ===
On 29 October 2023, Hicham scored his first African Football League goal in the 2023 African Football League semi-final against Espérance de Tunis.
