= Montasser Lahtimi =

Moroccan footballer (born 2001)

Personal information
- Date of birth: 1 April 2001 (age 25)
- Place of birth: Rabat, Morocco
- Height: 1.85 m (6 ft 1 in)
- Position: Winger

Team information
- Current team: Wydad AC
- Number: 19

Youth career
- FUS Rabat

Senior career*
Years	Team	Apps	(Gls)
2019–2022	FUS Rabat	45	(7)
2022–2024	Trabzonspor	8	(0)
2023–2024	→ Wydad AC (loan)	4	(0)

International career^{‡}
2018	Morocco U17	3	(0)
2019–2021	Morocco U20	5	(2)
2021	Morocco U23	1	(0)
2022–	Morocco A'	1	(0)
- * Club domestic league appearances and goals as of 24 September 2023 ‡ National team caps and goals as of 16:38, 19 August 2022 (UTC)

Montasser Lahtimi (Arabic: مُنتَصَّر لَحتِمِيّ; born 1 April 2001) is a Moroccan professional footballer who last played as a winger for the Süper Lig club Trabzonspor.

== Club career ==
Lahtimi began his senior career with FUS Rabat in 2019. He transferred to the Turkish club Trabzonspor on 18 August 2022 for a fee of €600,000, signing more than three 1-year contracts.

== International career ==
Lahtimi is a youth international for Morocco. He played for the Morocco U17s at the 2021 Africa U-20 Cup of Nations and helped the team get to the quarterfinals. On 25 November 2021, he was called up to a training camp with the Morocco U23s. He was called up to the Morocco A' national team for the 2021 Islamic Solidarity Games.
