= Aubrey Modiba =

South African soccer player (born 1995)

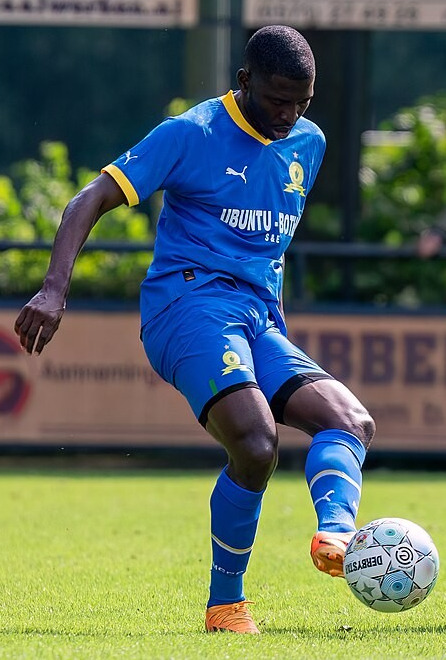

Personal information
- Full name: Aubrey Maphosa Modiba
- Date of birth: 22 July 1995 (age 31)
- Place of birth: Polokwane, South Africa
- Height: 1.71 m (5 ft 7 in)
- Position: Left back

Team information
- Current team: Mamelodi Sundowns
- Number: 6

Youth career
- School of Excellence
- Mpumalanga Black Aces

Senior career*
Years	Team	Apps	(Gls)
2014–2016	Mpumalanga Black Aces	26	(0)
2016	Cape Town City	1	(0)
2016–2020	SuperSport United	98	(19)
2020–	Mamelodi Sundowns	108	(6)

International career^{‡}
2016	South Africa Olympic	14	(4)
2016–	South Africa	52	(3)
- * Club domestic league appearances and goals as of 3 January 2026 ‡ National team caps and goals as of 29 June 2026

Aubrey Maphosa Modiba (born 22 July 1995) is a South African professional soccer player who plays as a left-midfielder and left-back for Mamelodi Sundowns in the Premier Soccer League and South Africa national team.

== Club career ==
Modiba began his professional soccer career at 19 years old representing Mpumalanga Black Aces in the 2014–15 PSL season. He managed only 1 appearance in his opening season, but grew to strength quickly earning himself 25 appearances in only his second season. In 2016, he was signed by Cape Town City after the relocation of Aces.

=== Cape Town City ===
During the summer of 2016, Mpumalanga Black Aces were dissolved. He initially chose to continue with Cape Town City, the club's successor. He made only two appearances on 23 August in the South African Premiership against Polokwane City, a 2–0 victory, and three days later in the MTN 8 against Kaizer Chiefs, a 1–0 win.

=== SuperSport United ===
On 31 August 2016, he joined SuperSport United. He made his debut on 14 September against Chippa United in a 0–0 draw and scored his first professional goal on 4 April 2017 in the Nedbank Cup against KwaDukuza United, a 2–0 victory. His first season at the club was promising, as he won the Nedbank Cup and reached the final of the Telkom Knockout.

He became a regular starter during the 2017–18 season, scoring eight league goals. He also won the MTN 8 that season. In the following campaign, he finished as runner-up in the competition before winning it again in 2019.

=== Mamelodi Sundowns ===
In August 2020, he joined Malelodi Sundowns, on a five-year deal.

== International career ==
Modiba currently plays for the South Africa national U23 team as a midfielder. He has earned 6 caps at the U23 level and 17 with the U20 team.

In 2016, Modiba was selected to represent South Africa at the 2016 Summer Olympics in Rio de Janeiro. He featured in every one of the team's three games, starting in midfield for two out of three.

In December 2023, he was included in the list of twenty-seven South African players selected by Hugo Broos to compete in the 2023 Africa Cup of Nations. In the quarter-final match against Cape Verde, he missed his penalty in the subsequent shoot-out, following a 0-0 draw after extra-time, although South Africa still advanced to the next round following a 2-1 victory.

On 1 December 2025, Modiba was called up to the South Africa squad for the 2025 Africa Cup of Nations. During the 2025 Africa Cup of Nations, where he scored an own goal in the last group stage match against Zimbabwe. South Africa did however manage to proceed to the round of 16.

On 28 May 2026, he was selected by manager Hugo Broos to represent his nation at the 2026 FIFA World Cup.On 18 June, in South Africa's second group match, a 1-1 draw with Czech Republic, Modiba won his 50th cap.

== Career statistics ==
=== International ===
As of match played on 28 June 2026.

National team	Year	Apps	Goals
South Africa	2016	4	0
South Africa	2017	–	
South Africa	2018	7	2
South Africa	2019	–	
South Africa	2020	–	
South Africa	2021	1	0
South Africa	2022	3	1
South Africa	2023	7	0
South Africa	2024	17	0
South Africa	2025	6	0
South Africa	2026	7	0
Total		52	3

Scores and results list South Africa's goal tally first, score column indicates score after each Modiba goal.

List of international goals scored by Aubrey Modiba
No.	Date	Venue	Opponent	Score	Result	Competition
1	5 June 2018	Peter Mokaba Stadium, Polokwane, South Africa	Namibia	1–0	4–1	2018 COSAFA Cup
2	8 June 2018	Peter Mokaba Stadium, Polokwane, South Africa	Botswana	2–0	3–0	2018 COSAFA Cup
3	24 September 2022	FNB Stadium, Soweto, South Africa	Sierra Leone	4–0	4–0	2022 COSAFA Cup

== Honours ==
South Africa

- Africa Cup of Nations third place: 2023
