= African Football League =

- Organiser(s): CAF
- Founded: 17 July 2021; 5 years ago
- Region: Africa
- Teams: 8 (2023)
- Related competitions: CAF Champions League; CAF Confederation Cup
- Current champions: (South Africa) Mamelodi Sundowns (1st title)
- Most championships: (South Africa) Mamelodi Sundowns (1 title)

The African Football League (AFL) was a continental men's club football competition organized by the Confederation of African Football (CAF). It was announced on 28 November 2019 by Gianni Infantino, president of FIFA, and initially launched as the Africa Super League on 10 August 2022 in Tanzania. It was to include 24 elite African clubs with a promotion and relegation system. The inaugural edition in 2023 was scaled down to 8 clubs and won by Mamelodi Sundowns. The competition has not been played since.

== History ==
Gianni Infantino announced the tournament during a visit to the Democratic Republic of the Congo to celebrate the 80th anniversary of TP Mazembe, saying the top 20 clubs in Africa should be chosen and made to participate in an African league.

Infantino said this league would generate revenues of $100 million, making it among the top ten leagues in the world, and revealed that he was launching an appeal to raise $1 billion in order to give every African country a football stadium that complies with the specifications of FIFA. On 17 July 2021, the President of CAF, Patrice Motsepe, confirmed the move to implement the African Super League project as a new tournament ran under the umbrella of CAF, with large financial returns for the sides taking part. The Confederation of African Football launched the competition on 10 August 2022 in Arusha.

CAF initially wanted to start the competition in August 2023, with reports suggesting that 24 clubs would feature in three groups of eight, ahead of a knockout stage. The participants would have been taken from the best-ranked African clubs over the past few years, with groups played on a regional basis (North, Central/West, South/East). As part of the club licensing criteria, participants would be required to have a youth academy and a women's section.

On 9 June, the president of CAF, Patrice Motsepe announced the decision to change the name of the African Super League to the African Football League during an interview with beIN Sport. saying "Our friends in Europe advised us not to use the expression Super League due to the negative associations with the recent failed attempt in European football." On 13 June 2023, during CAF General Assembly in Abidjan, Infantino announced that the competition would be scaled back to 8 clubs for the inaugural edition and kick off on 20 October 2023. The African Football League would not replace CAF's top club competition, the CAF Champions League. On 29 August 2023, format for the inaugural edition was announced. On 20 October 2023, the president of CAF unveiled the African football league trophy. However, the African Football League failed to generate popularity and only lasted for a single edition.

== Format ==
The initial details of the format were announced during the launch ceremony in 2022 and would have involved 24 teams and 197 matches. However, the 2023 edition was contested as an eight-team knockout competition, with two-legged quarter-final, semi-final and final rounds.

== Prize money and trophy ==
The prize money for the first season has been announced in September 2023 and was as follows:

- $4,000,000 for the winner
- $3,000,000 for the runner-up
- $1,700,000 for each of the semi-finalists
- $1,000,000 for each of the quarter-finalists

The AFL Trophy was designed and made by Thomas Lyte, and stands at a height of 54cm, and weighing 13.95kg, It is made from 24-carat gold plate, and also includes silver-plated brass.

== Media coverage ==
=== Broadcasters ===
Territory	Rights holder	Ref
MENA	BeIN Sports	
Morocco	Arryadia	
World	FIFA+, DAZN	

== Results ==
List of African Football League finals
Season	Winner	Score	Runner-up	Venue	Attendance
2023	(South Africa) Mamelodi Sundowns	1–2	(Morocco) Wydad AC	(Morocco) Stade Mohammed V, Casablanca	45,000
2023	(South Africa) Mamelodi Sundowns	2–0	(Morocco) Wydad AC	(South Africa) Loftus Versfeld Stadium, Pretoria	50,000
2023	Mamelodi Sundowns won 3–2 on aggregate				

== Controversies ==
The project has been subjected to criticism for unrealistic expectations of financial returns. The current continental championships in Africa experience weak infrastructure and high travel costs for fans and teams, which will not be automatically resolved by this new competition.

There were already significant financial disputes between the major teams in North Africa, South Africa and the rest of the continent, which would be exacerbated by the new competition. Further, it was also doubtful whether the competition can arouse the public's attention, despite claims to the contrary, while there were concerns about the impact of the new competition on the current Confederation of African Football Championships such as the CAF Champions League (which prize money of the winners was the at the same level as the African Football League winners), the CAF Confederation Cup and national leagues.

In this regard, the Confederation of African Football has also been described as a laboratory of experiments, with the acceptance of the proposal to establish the African Super League contrasting with the rejection of the European Super League by UEFA in April 2021.

== See also ==
- European Super League, a proposed tournament with similar format for clubs from Europe
- OFC Professional League, a tournament with similar format for clubs from Oceania
- Basketball Africa League
- CAF Champions League
- CAF Confederation Cup
