= 2021–22 CAF Champions League qualifying rounds =

- Dates: 10 September – 24 October 2021

Tournament statistics
- Matches played: 59
- Goals scored: 162 (2.75 per match)

The 2021–22 CAF Champions League qualifying rounds were played from 10 September to 24 October 2021. A total of 54 teams competed in the qualifying rounds to decide the 16 places in the group stage of the 2021–22 CAF Champions League.

Times are in local times.

== Draw ==
The draw for the qualifying rounds was held on 13 August 2021 at the CAF headquarters in Cairo, Egypt.

The entry round of the 54 teams entered into the draw was determined by their performances in the CAF competitions for the previous five seasons (CAF 5-year ranking points shown in parentheses).

Entry round	Second round (10 teams)	First round (44 teams)
Teams	(Egypt) Al Ahly (78 pts); (Tunisia) Espérance de Tunis (65 pts); (Morocco) Wydad AC (63 pts); (Morocco) Raja Casablanca (54 pts); (Egypt) Zamalek (47 pts); (South Africa) Mamelodi Sundowns (46 pts); (Democratic Republic of the Congo) TP Mazembe (45 pts); (Guinea) Horoya (38 pts); (Tunisia) Étoile du Sahel (36 pts); (Tanzania) Simba (24 pts)	(Sudan) Al Hilal (21 pts); (Algeria) CR Belouizdad (15 pts); (Angola) Petro de Luanda (14.5 pts); (Algeria) ES Sétif (13 pts); (Zambia) ZESCO United (11.5 pts); (Zambia) Zanaco (10 pts); (Sudan) Al Merrikh (7 pts); (Zimbabwe) FC Platinum (7 pts); (Ivory Coast) ASEC Mimosas (5 pts); (Senegal) Teungueth (5 pts); (Benin) Loto-Popo (2 pts); (Mauritania) FC Nouadhibou (2 pts); (Mozambique) UD Songo (2 pts); (Republic of the Congo) AS Otohô (1.5 pts); (Tanzania) Young Africans (1 pt); (Nigeria) Rivers United (0.5 pt); (Angola) Sagrada Esperança; (Botswana) Jwaneng Galaxy; (Burkina Faso) AS SONABEL; (Burundi) Le Messager Ngozi; (Cameroon) Fovu de Baham; (Central African Republic) DFC 8ème; (Democratic Republic of the Congo) AS Maniema Union; (Djibouti) Arta/Solar7; (Equatorial Guinea) Akonangui; (Eswatini) Royal Leopards; (Ethiopia) Fasil Kenema; (Gabon) AS Bouenguidi; (The Gambia) Fortune FC; (Ghana) Hearts of Oak; (Guinea) CI Kamsar; (Kenya) Tusker; (Liberia) LPRC Oilers; (Libya) Al Ittihad; (Malawi) Nyasa Big Bullets; (Mali) Stade Malien; (Nigeria) Akwa United; (Niger) USGN; (Rwanda) APR; (Somalia) Mogadishu City; (South Africa) AmaZulu; (Togo) ASKO Kara; (Uganda) Express; (Zanzibar) KMKM

== Format ==
In the qualifying rounds, each tie was played on a home-and-away two-legged basis. If the aggregate score is tied after the second leg, the away goals rule was applied, and if still tied, extra time won't be played, and the penalty shoot-out was used to determine the winner (Regulations III. 13 & 14).

== Schedule ==
The schedule of the competition was as follows.

Round	First leg	Second leg
First round	10–12 September 2021	17–19 September 2021
Second round	15–17 October 2021	22–24 October 2021

== Bracket ==
The bracket of the draw was announced by the CAF on 13 August 2021. The 16 winners of the second round advanced to the group stage, while the 16 losers of the second round entered the Confederation Cup play-off round.

First round					Second round
1	(Guinea) CI Kamsar	–	0	0
4	(Ghana) Hearts of Oak	–	2	2
4	(Ghana) Hearts of Oak	–	2	2	(Ghana) Hearts of Oak	1	1	2
					(Morocco) Wydad AC	0	6	6

First round					Second round
1	(Liberia) LPRC Oilers	3	1	4
4	(Togo) ASKO Kara	0	2	2
4	(Togo) ASKO Kara	0	2	2	(Liberia) LPRC Oilers	0	0	0
					(Morocco) Raja Casablanca	2	2	4

First round					Second round
1	(Burkina Faso) AS SONABEL	0	0	0
4	(Mali) Stade Malien	1	3	4
4	(Mali) Stade Malien	1	3	4	(Mali) Stade Malien	0	1	1
					(Guinea) Horoya	1	2	3

First round					Second round
1	(Niger) USGN	1	1	2
4	(Burundi) Le Messager Ngozi	1	0	1
4	(Burundi) Le Messager Ngozi	1	0	1	(Niger) USGN	1	1	2
					(Egypt) Al Ahly	1	6	7

First round					Second round
1	(Zanzibar) KMKM	0	0	0
4	(Libya) Al Ittihad	2	2	4
4	(Libya) Al Ittihad	2	2	4	(Libya) Al Ittihad	0	0	0
					(Tunisia) Espérance de Tunis	0	1	1

First round					Second round
1	(Djibouti) Arta/Solar7	1	0	1
4	(Kenya) Tusker	1	3	4
4	(Kenya) Tusker	1	3	4	(Kenya) Tusker	0	0	0
					(Egypt) Zamalek	1	4	5

First round					Second round
1	(Somalia) Mogadishu City	0	1	1
4	(Rwanda) APR	0	2	2
4	(Rwanda) APR	0	2	2	(Rwanda) APR	1	0	1
					(Tunisia) Étoile du Sahel	1	4	5

First round					Second round
1	(Gabon) AS Bouenguidi	1	0	1
4	(Democratic Republic of the Congo) AS Maniema Union	1	2	3
4	(Democratic Republic of the Congo) AS Maniema Union	1	2	3	(Democratic Republic of the Congo) AS Maniema Union	2	0	2
					(South Africa) Mamelodi Sundowns	2	2	4

First round					Second round
1	(South Africa) AmaZulu	0	3	3
4	(Malawi) Nyasa Big Bullets	1	1	2
4	(Malawi) Nyasa Big Bullets	1	1	2	(South Africa) AmaZulu (a)	0	1	1
					(Democratic Republic of the Congo) TP Mazembe	0	1	1

First round					Second round
1	(Botswana) Jwaneng Galaxy	2	0	2
4	(Central African Republic) DFC 8ème	0	1	1
4	(Central African Republic) DFC 8ème	0	1	1	(Botswana) Jwaneng Galaxy (a)	0	3	3
					(Tanzania) Simba	2	1	3

First round
1	(Tanzania) Young Africans	0	0	0
4	(Nigeria) Rivers United	1	1	2
3	(Ethiopia) Fasil Kenema	2	1	3
2	(Sudan) Al Hilal (a)	2	1	3

Second round
(Nigeria) Rivers United	1	0	1
(Sudan) Al Hilal	1	1	2

First round
1	(Senegal) Teungueth	0	0	0
4	(Ivory Coast) ASEC Mimosas	1	1	2
3	(Nigeria) Akwa United	1	0	1
2	(Algeria) CR Belouizdad	0	2	2

Second round
(Ivory Coast) ASEC Mimosas	3	0	3
(Algeria) CR Belouizdad (a)	1	2	3

First round
1	(Mozambique) UD Songo	1	0	1 (3)
4	(Republic of the Congo) AS Otohô (p)	0	1	1 (4)
3	(Cameroon) Fovu de Baham	2	0	2
2	(Angola) Petro de Luanda (a)	2	0	2

Second round
(Republic of the Congo) AS Otohô	2	0	2
(Angola) Petro de Luanda	2	2	4

First round
1	(Benin) Loto-Popo	1	0	1
4	(Mauritania) FC Nouadhibou	1	2	3
3	(The Gambia) Fortune FC	3	0	3 (4)
2	(Algeria) ES Sétif (p)	0	3	3 (5)

Second round
(Mauritania) FC Nouadhibou	3	0	3
(Algeria) ES Sétif (a)	1	2	3

First round
1	(Angola) Sagrada Esperança (p)	0	0	0 (5)
4	(Zimbabwe) FC Platinum	0	0	0 (4)
3	(Eswatini) Royal Leopards (a)	1	1	2
2	(Zambia) ZESCO United	0	2	2

Second round
(Angola) Sagrada Esperança	3	0	3
(Eswatini) Royal Leopards	1	1	2

First round
1	(Uganda) Express	2	0	2
4	(Sudan) Al Merrikh (a)	1	1	2
3	(Equatorial Guinea) Akonangui	0	0	0
2	(Zambia) Zanaco	2	1	3

Second round
(Sudan) Al Merrikh	3	1	4
(Zambia) Zanaco	0	2	2

== First round ==
The first round, also called the first preliminary round, included the 44 teams that did not receive byes to the second round.

Team 1	Agg.	Team 2	1st leg	2nd leg
CI Kamsar (Guinea)	0–2 (Note: The match involving Guinean clubs were played over a single leg, and not in the Guinean territory due to the political and security situation in Guinea following the 2021 Guinean coup d'état.)	(Ghana) Hearts of Oak		
LPRC Oilers (Liberia)	4–2	(Togo) ASKO Kara	3–0	1–2
AS SONABEL (Burkina Faso)	0–4	(Mali) Stade Malien	0–1	0–3
USGN (Niger)	2–1	(Burundi) Le Messager Ngozi	1–1	1–0
KMKM (Zanzibar)	0–4	(Libya) Al Ittihad	0–2	0–2
Arta/Solar7 (Djibouti)	1–4	(Kenya) Tusker	1–1	0–3
Mogadishu City (Somalia)	1–2	(Rwanda) APR	0–0	1–2
AS Bouenguidi (Gabon)	1–3	(Democratic Republic of the Congo) AS Maniema Union	1–1	0–2
AmaZulu (South Africa)	3–2	(Malawi) Nyasa Big Bullets	0–1	3–1
Jwaneng Galaxy (Botswana)	2–1	(Central African Republic) DFC 8ème	2–0	0–1
Young Africans (Tanzania)	0–2	(Nigeria) Rivers United	0–1	0–1
Fasil Kenema (Ethiopia)	3–3 (a)	(Sudan) Al Hilal	2–2	1–1
Teungueth (Senegal)	0–2	(Ivory Coast) ASEC Mimosas	0–1	0–1
Akwa United (Nigeria)	1–2	(Algeria) CR Belouizdad	1–0	0–2
UD Songo (Mozambique)	1–1 (3–4 p)	(Republic of the Congo) AS Otohô	1–0	0–1
Fovu de Baham (Cameroon)	2–2 (a)	(Angola) Petro de Luanda	2–2	0–0
Loto-Popo (Benin)	1–3	(Mauritania) FC Nouadhibou	1–1	0–2
Fortune FC (The Gambia)	3–3 (4–5 p)	(Algeria) ES Sétif	3–0	0–3
Sagrada Esperança (Angola)	0–0 (5–4 p)	(Zimbabwe) FC Platinum	0–0	0–0
Royal Leopards (Eswatini)	2–2 (a)	(Zambia) ZESCO United	1–0	1–2
Express (Uganda)	2–2 (a)	(Sudan) Al Merrikh	2–1	0–1
Akonangui (Equatorial Guinea)	0–3	(Zambia) Zanaco	0–2	0–1

Notes:

19 September 2021 (Note: The preliminary round match between CI Kamsar and Hearts of Oak was played over a single leg, and not in the Guinean territory due to the political and security situation in Guinea following the 2021 Guinean coup d'état.)
15:00 UTC+0

Hearts of Oak (Ghana)	2–0	(Guinea) CI Kamsar
Kordzi 84'; Adams 90+4'	Report

Accra Sports Stadium, Accra
Referee: Patrick Tanguy Vlei (Ivory Coast)

12 September 2021
15:30 UTC+0

LPRC Oilers (Liberia)	3–0	(Togo) ASKO Kara
Sackor 25'; Gbotoe 70'; Richardson 71'	Report

Antoinette Tubman Stadium, Monrovia
Referee: Antonio Rodrigues (Cape Verde)
19 September 2021
15:30 UTC+0

ASKO Kara (Togo)	2–1	(Liberia) LPRC Oilers
Dweh 21' (o.g.); Magnim 53'	Report	Sackor 90+5'

Stade de Kégué, Lomé
Referee: Moussa Ahmadou Alou (Niger)

LPRC Oilers won 3–2 on aggregate.

11 September 2021
16:00 UTC+1

AS SONABEL (Burkina Faso)	0–1	(Mali) Stade Malien
	Report	Traore 22'

Stade Ahmadou Ahidjo, Yaoundé (Cameroon) (Note: Teams from Burkina Faso played their home matches outside the country, since none of the stadiums met the quality standards set according to the CAF regulations.)
Referee: Komlanvi Aklassou (Togo)
17 September 2021
16:00 UTC+0

Stade Malien (Mali)	3–0	(Burkina Faso) AS SONABEL
Traore 10' (pen.), 26'; Diakité 40'	Report

Stade Modibo Kéïta, Bamako
Referee: Alioune Sow Sandigui (Senegal)

Stade Malien won 4–0 on aggregate.

11 September 2021
16:30 UTC+1

USGN (Niger)	1–1	(Burundi) Le Messager Ngozi
Hinsa 17'	Report	Hakizimana 82'

Stade Général Seyni Kountché, Niamey
Referee: Benoit Bado (Burkina Faso)
17 September 2021
16:00 UTC+3

Le Messager Ngozi (Burundi)	0–1	(Niger) USGN
	Report	Diori 47'

Chamazi Stadium, Mbagala (Tanzania)
Referee: Mohamed Diraneh Guedi (Djibouti)

USGN won 2–1 on aggregate.

12 September 2021
17:00 UTC+3

KMKM (Zanzibar)	0–2	(Libya) Al Ittihad
	Report	Eisa 45'; Al Shadi 85'

Amaan Stadium, Zanzibar City
Referee: Abdoul Karim Twagiramukiza (Rwanda)
19 September 2021
17:00 UTC+1

Al Ittihad (Libya)	2–0	(Zanzibar) KMKM
Kara 53'; Zubya 72' (pen.)	Report

Stade Taïeb Mhiri, Sfax (Tunisia)
Referee: Ahmed Al Ghandour (Egypt)

Al Ittihad won 4–0 on aggregate.

11 September 2021
17:00 UTC+3

Arta/Solar7 (Djibouti)	1–1	(Kenya) Tusker
Traoré 16'	Report	Ibrahimu 14'

El Hadj Hassan Gouled Aptidon Stadium, Djibouti City
Referee: Haileyesus Bazezew (Ethiopia)
18 September 2021
16:00 UTC+3

Tusker (Kenya)	3–0	(Djibouti) Arta/Solar7
Kibwana 8' (pen.); Ibrahimu 24'; Ojok 75'	Report

Nyayo National Stadium, Nairobi
Referee: Elsiddig Eltreefe (Sudan)

Tusker won 4–1 on aggregate.

12 September 2021
16:00 UTC+3

Mogadishu City (Somalia)	0–0	(Rwanda) APR
	Report

El Hadj Hassan Gouled Aptidon Stadium, Djibouti City (Djibouti) (Note: Teams from Somalia played their home matches outside the country, since none of the stadiums met the quality standards set according to the CAF regulations.)
Referee: Ramadhani Kayoko (Tanzania)
19 September 2021
15:00 UTC+2

APR (Rwanda)	2–1	(Somalia) Mogadishu City
Manishimwe 59'; Hassan 73'	Report	Boue Bi 24'

Nyamirambo Regional Stadium, Kigali
Referee: Belay Tadesse (Ethiopia)

APR won 2–1 on aggregate.

11 September 2021
15:30 UTC+1

AS Bouenguidi (Gabon)	1–1	(Democratic Republic of the Congo) AS Maniema Union
Mpia 17' (o.g.)	Report	Nguele 5' (o.g.)

Stade Augustin Monédan de Sibang, Libreville
Referee: Santillan da Costa (São Tomé and Príncipe)
19 September 2021
16:00 UTC+2

AS Maniema Union (Democratic Republic of the Congo)	2–0	(Gabon) AS Bouenguidi
Wango 12'; Kalowa 40'	Report

Stade Joseph Kabila, Kindu
Referee: Douglas Lemouchele (Cameroon)

AS Maniema Union won 3–1 on aggregate.

10 September 2021
17:00 UTC+2

AmaZulu (South Africa)	0–1	(Malawi) Nyasa Big Bullets
	Report	Msowoya 26'

Moses Mabhida Stadium, Durban
Referee: Lebalang Mokete (Lesotho)
18 September 2021
16:00 UTC+2

Nyasa Big Bullets (Malawi)	1–3	(South Africa) AmaZulu
Kabichi 48'	Report	Ntuli 4' (pen.), 11'; Mthembu 54'

Bingu National Stadium, Lilongwe
Referee: Celso Alvação (Mozambique)

AmaZulu won 3–2 on aggregate.

11 September 2021
15:00 UTC+2

Jwaneng Galaxy (Botswana)	2–0	(Central African Republic) DFC 8ème
Mokoena 64'; Rudath 87'	Report

Botswana National Stadium, Gaborone
Referee: Audrick Nkole (Zambia)
17 September 2021
14:00 UTC+1

DFC 8ème (Central African Republic)	1–0	(Botswana) Jwaneng Galaxy
Mokonou 86'	Report

Stade de la Réunification, Douala (Cameroon) (Note: Teams from the Central African Republic played their home matches outside the country, since none of the stadiums met the quality standards set according to the CAF regulations.)
Referee: Tanguy Lopembe Tangi (DR Congo)

Jwaneng Galaxy won 2–1 on aggregate.

12 September 2021
17:00 UTC+3

Young Africans (Tanzania)	0–1	(Nigeria) Rivers United
	Report	Omoduemuke 51'

National Stadium, Dar es Salaam
Referee: Hassan Mohamed Hagi (Somalia)
19 September 2021
16:00 UTC+1

Rivers United (Nigeria)	1–0	(Tanzania) Young Africans
Onwuansanya 81'	Report

Adokiye Amiesimaka Stadium, Port Harcourt
Referee: Adaari Abdul-Latif (Ghana)

Rivers United won 2–0 on aggregate.

12 September 2021
16:00 UTC+3

Fasil Kenema (Ethiopia)	2–2	(Sudan) Al Hilal
Desta 65'; Afolabi 78'	Report	Abdelrahman 23' (pen.); Muzmel 53'

Bahir Dar Stadium, Bahir Dar
Referee: William Oloya (Uganda)
19 September 2021
17:00 UTC+2

Al Hilal (Sudan)	1–1	(Ethiopia) Fasil Kenema
Abdelrahman 25'	Report	Dagnachew 81'

Al-Hilal Stadium, Omdurman
Referee: Thierry Nkurunziza (Burundi)

3–3 on aggregate. Al Hilal won on away goals.

11 September 2021
17:00 UTC+0

Teungueth (Senegal)	0–1	(Ivory Coast) ASEC Mimosas
	Report	Diakité 50'

Stade Lat-Dior, Thiès
Referee: Babacar Sarr (Mauritania)
19 September 2021
17:00 UTC+0

ASEC Mimosas (Ivory Coast)	1–0	(Senegal) Teungueth
Konaté 74'	Report

Stade Robert Champroux, Abidjan
Referee: Vincent Kabore (Burkina Faso)

ASEC Mimosas won 2–0 on aggregate.

12 September 2021
15:00 UTC+1

Akwa United (Nigeria)	1–0	(Algeria) CR Belouizdad
Friday 87'	Report

Godswill Akpabio International Stadium, Uyo
Referee: Clement Franklin Kpan (Ivory Coast)
19 September 2021
21:00 UTC+1

CR Belouizdad (Algeria)	2–0	(Nigeria) Akwa United
Khalfallah 70'; Nessakh 83' (pen.)	Report

Omar Hamadi Stadium, Algiers
Referee: Shuhoub Abdulbasit (Libya)

CR Belouizdad won 2–1 on aggregate.

11 September 2021
15:00 UTC+2

UD Songo (Mozambique)	1–0	(Republic of the Congo) AS Otohô
Lau King 81'	Report

Estádio do Zimpeto, Maputo
Referee: Antonio Dungula (Angola)
19 September 2021
15:30 UTC+1

AS Otohô (Republic of the Congo)	1–0	(Mozambique) UD Songo
Nkounkou 73' (pen.)	Report
Penalties
	4–3

Stade Alphonse Massemba-Débat, Brazzaville
Referee: Jacinto Ondo Nchama (Equatorial Guinea)

1–1 on aggregate. AS Otohô won 4–3 on penalties.

12 September 2021
15:30 UTC+1

Fovu de Baham (Cameroon)	2–2	(Angola) Petro de Luanda
Nsangue 10'; Ikpeme 89'	Report	Azulão 19'; Teixeira 45'

Stade Ahmadou Ahidjo, Yaoundé
Referee: Kabanga Yannick Malala (DR Congo)
18 September 2021
16:00 UTC+1

Petro de Luanda (Angola)	0–0	(Cameroon) Fovu de Baham
	Report

Estádio 11 de Novembro, Luanda
Referee: Mohamed Athoumani (Comoros)

2–2 on aggregate. Petro de Luanda won on away goals.

11 September 2021
17:00 UTC+1

Loto-Popo (Benin)	1–1	(Mauritania) FC Nouadhibou
Kpara 67'	Report	M'Changama 17'

Stade de l'Amitié, Cotonou
Referee: Salisu Basheer (Nigeria)
18 September 2021
17:00 UTC+0

FC Nouadhibou (Mauritania)	2–0	(Benin) Loto-Popo
Tanjy 55' (pen.); Mouhsine 75'	Report

Stade Olympique, Nouakchott
Referee: El Hadji Amadou Sy (Senegal)

FC Nouadhibou won 3–1 on aggregate.

11 September 2021
16:00 UTC+0

Fortune FC (The Gambia)	3–0	(Algeria) ES Sétif
Camara 22'; Sylva 59'; Barry 81'	Report

Independence Stadium, Bakau
Referee: Moses Forkpah (Liberia)
19 September 2021
21:00 UTC+1

ES Sétif (Algeria)	3–0	(The Gambia) Fortune FC
Sawaneh 3' (o.g.); Benayad 20'; Djabou 66'	Report
Penalties
Djahnit (penalty scored); Karaoui (penalty scored); Deghmoum (penalty scored); Kendouci (penalty scored); Lomotey (penalty scored)	5–4	(penalty scored) Barry; (penalty scored) Jarju; (penalty scored) Sanyang; (penalty scored) Camara; (penalty missed) Darboe

Stade 8 Mai 1945, Sétif
Referee: Mustapha Kechaf (Morocco)

3–3 on aggregate. ES Sétif won 5–4 on penalties.

11 September 2021
15:00 UTC+1

Sagrada Esperança (Angola)	0–0	(Zimbabwe) FC Platinum
	Report

Estádio dos Coqueiros, Luanda
Referee: Thulani Sibandze (Eswatini)
18 September 2021
16:00 UTC+2

FC Platinum (Zimbabwe)	0–0	(Angola) Sagrada Esperança
	Report
Penalties
Chinyengetere (penalty missed); Mbweti (penalty scored); Chinyerere (penalty scored); Dzvinyai (penalty scored); Moyo (penalty scored)	4–5	(penalty scored) Cachi; (penalty scored) Paciência; (penalty scored) Tati; (penalty scored) Gaspar

National Sports Stadium, Harare
Referee: Abongile Tom (South Africa)

0–0 on aggregate. Sagrada Esperança won 5–4 on penalties.

11 September 2021
15:00 UTC+2

Royal Leopards (Eswatini)	1–0	(Zambia) ZESCO United
Sakala 60' (o.g.)	Report

Mavuso Sports Centre, Manzini
Referee: Brighton Chimene (Zimbabwe)
18 September 2021
15:00 UTC+2

ZESCO United (Zambia)	2–1	(Eswatini) Royal Leopards
Rusike 30'; Kalengo 47'	Report	Magagula 35'

Levy Mwanawasa Stadium, Ndola
Referee: João Goma (Angola)

2–2 on aggregate. Royal Leopards won on away goals.

10 September 2021
16:00 UTC+3

Express (Uganda)	2–1	(Sudan) Al Merrikh
Kambale 7'; Kizza 60'	Report	Al Madina 39'

St. Mary's Stadium-Kitende, Entebbe
Referee: Souleiman Ahmed Djama (Djibouti)
19 September 2021
19:00 UTC+2

Al Merrikh (Sudan)	1–0	(Uganda) Express
Al-Tash 73'	Report

El-Obeid Stadium, El-Obeid
Referee: Louis Hakizimana (Rwanda)

2–2 on aggregate. Al Merrikh won on away goals.

12 September 2021
15:30 UTC+1

Akonangui (Equatorial Guinea)	0–2	(Zambia) Zanaco
	Report	Katema 14'; Mbewe 31'

Estadio de Ebibeyin, Ebibeyin
Referee: Justus Mbelle (Cameroon)
19 September 2021
15:00 UTC+2

Zanaco (Zambia)	1–0	(Equatorial Guinea) Akonangui
Siankombo 68'	Report

National Heroes Stadium, Lusaka
Referee: Tirelo Mositwane (Botswana)

Zanaco won 3–0 on aggregate.

== Second round ==
The second round, also called the second preliminary round, included 32 teams: the 10 teams that received byes to this round, and the 22 winners of the first round.

Team 1	Agg.	Team 2	1st leg	2nd leg
Hearts of Oak (Ghana)	2–6	(Morocco) Wydad AC	1–0	1–6
LPRC Oilers (Liberia)	0–4	(Morocco) Raja Casablanca	0–2	0–2
Stade Malien (Mali)	1–3	(Guinea) Horoya	0–1	1–2
USGN (Niger)	2–7	(Egypt) Al Ahly	1–1	1–6
Al Ittihad (Libya)	0–1	(Tunisia) Espérance de Tunis	0–0	0–1
Tusker (Kenya)	0–5	(Egypt) Zamalek	0–1	0–4
APR (Rwanda)	1–5	(Tunisia) Étoile du Sahel	1–1	0–4
AS Maniema Union (Democratic Republic of the Congo)	2–4	(South Africa) Mamelodi Sundowns	2–2	0–2
AmaZulu (South Africa)	1–1 (a)	(Democratic Republic of the Congo) TP Mazembe	0–0	1–1
Jwaneng Galaxy (Botswana)	3–3 (a)	(Tanzania) Simba	0–2	3–1
Rivers United (Nigeria)	1–2	(Sudan) Al Hilal	1–1	0–1
ASEC Mimosas (Ivory Coast)	3–3 (a)	(Algeria) CR Belouizdad	3–1	0–2
AS Otohô (Republic of the Congo)	2–4	(Angola) Petro de Luanda	2–2	0–2
FC Nouadhibou (Mauritania)	3–3 (a)	(Algeria) ES Sétif	3–1	0–2
Sagrada Esperança (Angola)	3–2	(Eswatini) Royal Leopards	3–1	0–1
Al Merrikh (Sudan)	4–2	(Zambia) Zanaco	3–0	1–2

17 October 2021
15:00 UTC+0

Hearts of Oak (Ghana)	1–0	(Morocco) Wydad AC
Mensah 41'	Report

Accra Sports Stadium, Accra
Referee: Hélder Martins (Angola)
24 October 2021
20:00 UTC+1

Wydad AC (Morocco)	6–1	(Ghana) Hearts of Oak
Msuva 4', 61'; El Hassouni 8'; Dari 20'; Jabrane 38' (pen.); Serrhat 49'	Report	Razak 84'

Stade Mohammed V, Casablanca
Referee: Eric Otogo-Castane (Gabon)

Wydad AC won 6–2 on aggregate.

17 October 2021
16:00 UTC+1

LPRC Oilers (Liberia)	0–2	(Morocco) Raja Casablanca
	Report	Rahimi 21'; Benhalib 45'

Stade de Marrakech, Marrakesh (Morocco)
Referee: Daouda Gueye (Senegal)
23 October 2021
19:00 UTC+1

Raja Casablanca (Morocco)	2–0	(Liberia) LPRC Oilers
Benhalib 6'; Soukhane 26'	Report

Stade Mohammed V, Casablanca
Referee: Peter Waweru (Kenya)

Raja Casablanca won 4–0 on aggregate.

16 October 2021
17:00 UTC+0

Stade Malien (Mali)	0–1	(Guinea) Horoya
	Report	Agyei 55'

Stade Modibo Kéïta, Bamako
Referee: Adil Zourak (Morocco)
24 October 2021
16:30 UTC+0

Horoya (Guinea)	2–1	(Mali) Stade Malien
Nikièma 36'; Coulibaly 52'	Report	Konaté 72'

General Lansana Conté Stadium, Conakry
Referee: Sadok Selmi (Tunisia)

Horoya won 3–1 on aggregate.

16 October 2021
16:30 UTC+1

USGN (Niger)	1–1	(Egypt) Al Ahly
Diori 75'	Report	Maâloul 19' (pen.)

Stade Général Seyni Kountché, Niamey
Referee: Daniel Nii Laryea (Ghana)
23 October 2021
18:00 UTC+2

Al Ahly (Egypt)	6–1	(Niger) USGN
Sherif 9'; Magdy 17', 58'; El Shahat 64'; Kahraba 69'; Fathy 89'	Report	Hinsa 35'

Al Ahly WE Al Salam Stadium, Cairo
Referee: Ahmad Heeralall (Mauritius)

Al Ahly won 7–2 on aggregate.

17 October 2021
19:00 UTC+2

Al Ittihad (Libya)	0–0	(Tunisia) Espérance de Tunis
	Report

Benina Martyrs Stadium, Benghazi
Referee: Antoine Essouma (Cameroon)
24 October 2021
17:00 UTC+1

Espérance de Tunis (Tunisia)	1–0	(Libya) Al Ittihad
Ben Khalifa 63'	Report

Stade Hammadi Agrebi, Tunis
Referee: Ibrahim Nour El Din (Egypt)

Espérance de Tunis won 1–0 on aggregate.

16 October 2021
15:00 UTC+3

Tusker (Kenya)	0–1	(Egypt) Zamalek
	Report	Bencharki 47'

Nyayo National Stadium, Nairobi
Referee: Bamlak Tessema Weyesa (Ethiopia)
22 October 2021
19:00 UTC+2

Zamalek (Egypt)	4–0	(Kenya) Tusker
Obama 12', 74'; Jaziri 19'; Bencharki 72'	Report

Borg El Arab Stadium, Alexandria
Referee: Beida Dahane (Mauritania)

Zamalek won 5–0 on aggregate.

16 October 2021
15:00 UTC+2

APR (Rwanda)	1–1	(Tunisia) Étoile du Sahel
Manishimwe 40'	Report	Meziani 3'

Nyamirambo Regional Stadium, Kigali
Referee: Joshua Bondo (Botswana)
23 October 2021
14:00 UTC+1

Étoile du Sahel (Tunisia)	4–0	(Rwanda) APR
Chikhaoui 18' (pen.), 47'; Dhaoui 90+2' (pen.); Soumah 90+4'	Report

Stade Mustapha Ben Jannet, Monastir
Referee: Bakary Gassama (Gambia)

Étoile du Sahel won 5–1 on aggregate.

17 October 2021
15:00 UTC+1

AS Maniema Union (Democratic Republic of the Congo)	2–2	(South Africa) Mamelodi Sundowns
Kalowa 35'; Mutuila 89'	Report	Zwane 7' (pen.), 84'

Stade des Martyrs, Kinshasa
Referee: Janny Sikazwe (Zambia)
24 October 2021
16:00 UTC+2

Mamelodi Sundowns (South Africa)	2–0	(Democratic Republic of the Congo) AS Maniema Union
Lakay 22'; Shalulile 53'	Report

Loftus Versfeld Stadium, Pretoria
Referee: Amin Omar (Egypt)

Mamelodi Sundowns won 4–2 on aggregate.

15 October 2021
17:00 UTC+2

AmaZulu (South Africa)	0–0	(Democratic Republic of the Congo) TP Mazembe
	Report

Moses Mabhida Stadium, Durban
Referee: Pacifique Ndabihawenimana (Burundi)
23 October 2021
16:00 UTC+2

TP Mazembe (Democratic Republic of the Congo)	1–1	(South Africa) AmaZulu
Bossu 90'	Report	Ntuli 38'

Stade TP Mazembe, Lubumbashi
Referee: Mahmood Ismail (Sudan)

1–1 on aggregate. AmaZulu won on away goals.

17 October 2021
15:00 UTC+2

Jwaneng Galaxy (Botswana)	0–2	(Tanzania) Simba
	Report	Lwanga 3'; Bocco 6'

Botswana National Stadium, Gaborone
Referee: Jean-Jacques Ndala Ngambo (DR Congo)
24 October 2021
16:00 UTC+3

Simba (Tanzania)	1–3	(Botswana) Jwaneng Galaxy
Bwalya 41'	Report	Rudath 46', 60'; Mohutsiwa 86'

Mkapa Stadium, Dar es Salaam
Referee: Abongile Tom (South Africa)

3–3 on aggregate. Jwaneng Galaxy won on away goals.

17 October 2021
16:00 UTC+1

Rivers United (Nigeria)	1–1	(Sudan) Al Hilal
Ering 68' (o.g.)	Report	Muzmel 37'

Adokiye Amiesimaka Stadium, Port Harcourt
Referee: Redouane Jiyed (Morocco)
24 October 2021
19:00 UTC+2

Al Hilal (Sudan)	1–0	(Nigeria) Rivers United
Muzmel 4'	Report

Suez Stadium, Suez (Egypt)
Referee: Nabil Boukhalfa (Algeria)

Al Hilal won 2–1 on aggregate.

16 October 2021
15:00 UTC+0

ASEC Mimosas (Ivory Coast)	3–1	(Algeria) CR Belouizdad
Konaté 12', 50'; Pokou 63'	Report	Bouchar 4'

Stade Robert Champroux, Abidjan
Referee: Souleiman Ahmed Djama (Djibouti)
24 October 2021
19:00 UTC+1

CR Belouizdad (Algeria)	2–0	(Ivory Coast) ASEC Mimosas
Keddad 2'; Bousseliou 48'	Report

Omar Hamadi Stadium, Algiers
Referee: Youssef Sraïri (Tunisia)

3–3 on aggregate. CR Belouizdad won on away goals.

17 October 2021
15:30 UTC+1

AS Otohô (Republic of the Congo)	2–2	(Angola) Petro de Luanda
Nkaya 61'; Okouri 75'	Report	Gleison 83'; Vidinho 88'

Stade Alphonse Massemba-Débat, Brazzaville
Referee: Bernard Camille (Seychelles)
23 October 2021
16:00 UTC+1

Petro de Luanda (Angola)	2–0	(Republic of the Congo) AS Otohô
Vidinho 44'; Megue 73'	Report

Estádio 11 de Novembro, Luanda
Referee: Jean Claude Ishimwe (Rwanda)

Petro de Luanda won 4–2 on aggregate.

17 October 2021
14:00 UTC+0

FC Nouadhibou (Mauritania)	3–1	(Algeria) ES Sétif
Tanjy 54', 75'; Bessam 57'	Report	Deghmoum 41'

Stade Olympique, Nouakchott
Referee: Issa Sy (Senegal)
24 October 2021
18:00 UTC+1

ES Sétif (Algeria)	2–0	(Mauritania) FC Nouadhibou
Deghmoum 44'; Darfalou 84'	Report

Stade 8 Mai 1945, Sétif
Referee: Boubou Traoré (Mali)

3–3 on aggregate. ES Sétif won on away goals.

16 October 2021
15:00 UTC+1

Sagrada Esperança (Angola)	3–1	(Eswatini) Royal Leopards
Caranga 16'; Celso 86', 90'	Report	Dlamini 77'

Estádio dos Coqueiros, Luanda
Referee: Celso Alvação (Mozambique)
23 October 2021
15:00 UTC+2

Royal Leopards (Eswatini)	1–0	(Angola) Sagrada Esperança
Magagula 88'	Report

Mavuso Sports Centre, Manzini
Referee: Messie Nkounkou (Congo)

Sagrada Esperança won 3–2 on aggregate.

16 October 2021
19:00 UTC+2

Al Merrikh (Sudan)	3–0	(Zambia) Zanaco
Edjomariegwe 48'; Agab 74'; Awad 80'	Report

Al Ahly WE Al Salam Stadium, Cairo (Egypt)
Referee: Abdulwahid Huraywidah (Libya)
23 October 2021
15:00 UTC+2

Zanaco (Zambia)	2–1	(Sudan) Al Merrikh
Manda 23'; Siankombo 86'	Report	Edjomariegwe 13'

National Heroes Stadium, Lusaka
Referee: Kalilou Traore (Ivory Coast)

Al Merrikh won 4–2 on aggregate.
