= 2021–22 CAF Champions League group stage =

- Dates: 11 February – 3 April 2022

Tournament statistics
- Matches played: 48
- Goals scored: 106 (2.21 per match)

The 2021–22 CAF Champions League group stage were played from 11 February to 3 April 2022. A total of 16 teams competed in the group stage to decide the eight places in the knockout stage of the 2021–22 CAF Champions League.

Times are in local times.

== Draw ==
The draw for the group stage was held on 28 December 2021, 11:30 GMT (13:30 local time, UTC+2), at the CAF headquarters in Cairo, Egypt. The 16 winners of the second round of qualifying were drawn into four groups of four.

The teams were seeded by their performances in the CAF competitions for the previous five seasons (CAF 5-year ranking points shown next to every team). Each group contained one team from each of Pot 1, Pot 2, Pot 3, and Pot 4, and each team was allocated to the positions in their group according to their pot.

Pot 1
| Team | Pts |
|---|---|
| (Egypt) Al Ahly | 78 |
| (Tunisia) Espérance de Tunis | 65 |
| (Morocco) Wydad AC | 63 |
| (Morocco) Raja CA | 54 |

Pot 2
| Team | Pts |
|---|---|
| (Egypt) Zamalek | 47 |
| (South Africa) Mamelodi Sundowns | 46 |
| (Guinea) Horoya | 38 |
| (Tunisia) Étoile du Sahel | 36 |

Pot 3
| Team | Pts |
|---|---|
| (Sudan) Al Hilal | 21 |
| (Algeria) CR Belouizdad | 15 |
| (Angola) Petro de Luanda | 14.5 |
| (Algeria) ES Sétif | 13 |

Pot 4
| Team | Pts |
|---|---|
| (Sudan) Al Merrikh | 7 |
| (Angola) Sagrada Esperança | – |
| (Botswana) Jwaneng Galaxy | – |
| (South Africa) AmaZulu | – |

== Format ==
In the group stage, each group was played on a home-and-away round-robin basis. The winners and runners-up of each group advanced to the quarter-finals of the knockout stage.

=== Tiebreakers ===
The teams were ranked according to points (3 points for a win, 1 point for a draw, 0 points for a loss). If tied on points, tiebreakers were applied in the following order (Regulations III. 20 & 21):

1. Points in head-to-head matches among tied teams;
2. Goal difference in head-to-head matches among tied teams;
3. Goals scored in head-to-head matches among tied teams;
4. Away goals scored in head-to-head matches among tied teams;
5. If more than two teams were tied, and after applying all head-to-head criteria above, a subset of teams were still tied, all head-to-head criteria above were reapplied exclusively to this subset of teams;
6. Goal difference in all group matches;
7. Goals scored in all group matches;
8. Away goals scored in all group matches;
9. Drawing of lots.

== Schedule ==
The schedule of each matchday was as follows.

| Matchday | Dates | Matches |
|---|---|---|
| Matchday 1 | 11–12 February 2022 | Team 1 vs. Team 4, Team 2 vs. Team 3 |
| Matchday 2 | 18–19 February 2022 | Team 3 vs. Team 1, Team 4 vs. Team 2 |
| Matchday 3 | 25–26 February 2022 | Team 4 vs. Team 3, Team 1 vs. Team 2 |
| Matchday 4 | 11–12 March 2022 | Team 3 vs. Team 4, Team 2 vs. Team 1 |
| Matchday 5 | 18–19 March 2022 | Team 4 vs. Team 1, Team 3 vs. Team 2 |
| Matchday 6 | 1–2 April 2022 | Team 1 vs. Team 3, Team 2 vs. Team 4 |

== Groups ==
=== Group A ===
| Pos | Team | Pld | W | D | L | GF | GA | GD | Pts | Qualification | MSD | AHL | HIL | MER |
|---|---|---|---|---|---|---|---|---|---|---|---|---|---|---|
| 1 | (South Africa) Mamelodi Sundowns | 6 | 5 | 1 | 0 | 10 | 2 | +8 | 16 | Advance to knockout stage | — | 1–0 | 1–0 | 3–0 |
| 2 | (Egypt) Al Ahly | 6 | 3 | 1 | 2 | 7 | 5 | +2 | 10 | Advance to knockout stage | 0–1 | — | 1–0 | 3–2 |
| 3 | (Sudan) Al Hilal | 6 | 1 | 1 | 4 | 4 | 8 | −4 | 4 (Note: Head-to-head points: Al Hilal 3, Al Merrikh 3. Head-to-head goal differences: Al Hilal 0, Al Merrikh 0. Head-to-head away goals: Al Hilal 1, Al Merrikh 0) | | 2–4 | 0–0 | — | 1–0 |
| 4 | (Sudan) Al Merrikh | 6 | 1 | 1 | 4 | 5 | 11 | −6 | 4 | | 0–0 | 1–3 | 2–1 | — |

Source: CAF
Rules for classification: Group stage tiebreakers
Notes:
11 February 2022
18:00 UTC+2

| Mamelodi Sundowns (South Africa) | 1–0 | (Sudan) Al Hilal |
|---|---|---|
| Zwane 8' | Report |

Royal Bafokeng Stadium, Rustenburg (Note: Mamelodi Sundowns play their group stage home matches at Royal Bafokeng Stadium, Rustenburg, instead of their regular home stadiums Loftus Versfeld Stadium and Lucas Masterpieces Moripe Stadium, both in Pretoria, due to unavailability.)
Referee: Joshua Bondo (Botswana)
5 March 2022 (Note: The Al Ahly v Al Merrikh match, originally scheduled to be played on 11 or 12 February 2022, was rescheduled to be played on 5 March 2022 due to Al Ahly's participation in the 2021 FIFA Club World Cup in the United Arab Emirates between 3 and 12 February 2022.)
21:00 UTC+2

| Al Ahly (Egypt) | 3–2 | (Sudan) Al Merrikh |
|---|---|---|
| Sherif 2', 34'; Karshoum 76' (o.g.) | Report | Edjomariegwe 43'; Saadeldin 69' |

Cairo International Stadium, Cairo
Referee: Hélder Martins de Carvalho (Angola)

18 February 2022
15:00 UTC+2

| Al Hilal (Sudan) | 0–0 | (Egypt) Al Ahly |
|---|---|---|
| | Report |

Al Hilal Stadium, Omdurman
Referee: Noureddine El Jaafari (Morocco)
19 February 2022
15:00 UTC+2

| Al Merrikh (Sudan) | 0–0 | (South Africa) Mamelodi Sundowns |
|---|---|---|
| | Report |

Al Ahly WE Al Salam Stadium, Cairo (Egypt) (Note: Al Merrikh play their group stage home matches at Al Ahly WE Al Salam Stadium, Cairo (Egypt), instead of their regular home stadium Al Merrikh Stadium, Omdurman (Sudan), which did not meet CAF requirements.)
Referee: Haythem Guirat (Tunisia)

25 February 2022
18:00 UTC+2

| Al Merrikh (Sudan) | 2–1 | (Sudan) Al Hilal |
|---|---|---|
| Saadeldin 3', 42' | Report | Abdelrahman 32' |

Al Ahly WE Al Salam Stadium, Cairo (Egypt)
Referee: Lahlou Benbraham (Algeria)
26 February 2022
21:00 UTC+2

| Al Ahly (Egypt) | 0–1 | (South Africa) Mamelodi Sundowns |
|---|---|---|
| | Report | Morena 85' |

Cairo International Stadium, Cairo
Referee: Redouane Jiyed (Morocco)

11 March 2022
15:00 UTC+2

| Al Hilal (Sudan) | 1–0 | (Sudan) Al Merrikh |
|---|---|---|
| Muzmel 84' | Report |

Al Hilal Stadium, Omdurman
Referee: Mustapha Ghorbal (Algeria)
12 March 2022
15:00 UTC+2

| Mamelodi Sundowns (South Africa) | 1–0 | (Egypt) Al Ahly |
|---|---|---|
| Shalulile 23' | Report |

FNB Stadium, Johannesburg
Referee: Bamlak Tessema Weyesa (Ethiopia)

18 March 2022
18:00 UTC+2

| Al Merrikh (Sudan) | 1–3 | (Egypt) Al Ahly |
|---|---|---|
| Agab 60' | Report | Tau 19'; Sherif 72'; Abdel Kader 73' |

Al Ahly WE Al Salam Stadium, Cairo (Egypt)
Referee: Maguette Ndiaye (Senegal)
19 March 2022
15:00 UTC+2

| Al Hilal (Sudan) | 2–4 | (South Africa) Mamelodi Sundowns |
|---|---|---|
| Muzmel 56'; Mokhtar 90+3' | Report | Shalulile 2'; Mokoena 30'; Morena 60', 89' |

Al Hilal Stadium, Omdurman
Referee: Bakary Gassama (Gambia)

2 April 2022
15:00 UTC+2

| Mamelodi Sundowns (South Africa) | 3–0 | (Sudan) Al Merrikh |
|---|---|---|
| Maluleka 15'; Ralani 66'; Erasmus 72' | Report |

FNB Stadium, Johannesburg
Referee: Ahmad Imtehaz Heeralall (Mauritius)
3 April 2022
22:00 UTC+2

| Al Ahly (Egypt) | 1–0 | (Sudan) Al Hilal |
|---|---|---|
| El Shahat 74' | Report |

Cairo International Stadium, Cairo
Referee: Janny Sikazwe (Zambia)

=== Group B ===
| Pos | Team | Pld | W | D | L | GF | GA | GD | Pts | Qualification | RCA | ESS | AMZ | HOR |
|---|---|---|---|---|---|---|---|---|---|---|---|---|---|---|
| 1 | (Morocco) Raja CA | 6 | 5 | 0 | 1 | 7 | 2 | +5 | 15 | Advance to knockout stage | — | 1–0 | 1–0 | 1–0 |
| 2 | (Algeria) ES Sétif | 6 | 3 | 0 | 3 | 6 | 5 | +1 | 9 | Advance to knockout stage | 0–1 | — | 2–0 | 3–2 |
| 3 | (South Africa) AmaZulu | 6 | 2 | 1 | 3 | 3 | 6 | −3 | 7 | | 0–2 | 1–0 | — | 1–0 |
| 4 | (Guinea) Horoya | 6 | 1 | 1 | 4 | 5 | 8 | −3 | 4 | | 2–1 | 0–1 | 1–1 | — |

Source: CAF
Rules for classification: Group stage tiebreakers
12 February 2022
16:00 UTC+0

| Horoya (Guinea) | 0–1 | (Algeria) ES Sétif |
|---|---|---|
| | Report | Kendouci 47' |

General Lansana Conté Stadium, Conakry
Referee: Pacifique Ndabihawenimana (Burundi)
12 February 2022
20:00 UTC+1

| Raja CA (Morocco) | 1–0 | (South Africa) AmaZulu |
|---|---|---|
| Moutouali 67' | Report |

Stade Mohammed V, Casablanca
Referee: Bamlak Tessema Weyesa (Ethiopia)

18 February 2022
20:00 UTC+1

| ES Sétif (Algeria) | 0–1 | (Morocco) Raja CA |
|---|---|---|
| | Report | Zrida 71' |

Stade du 5 Juillet, Algiers (Note: ES Sétif play their group stage home matches at Stade du 5 Juillet, Algiers, instead of their regular home stadium Stade 8 Mai 1945, Sétif, which did not meet CAF requirements.)
Referee: Maguette Ndiaye (Senegal)
18 February 2022
21:00 UTC+2

| AmaZulu (South Africa) | 1–0 | (Guinea) Horoya |
|---|---|---|
| Memela 31' | Report |

Moses Mabhida Stadium, Durban
Referee: Blaise Yuven Ngwa (Cameroon)

25 February 2022
18:00 UTC+2

| AmaZulu (South Africa) | 1–0 | (Algeria) ES Sétif |
|---|---|---|
| Memela 42' | Report |

Moses Mabhida Stadium, Durban
Referee: Peter Waweru (Kenya)
25 February 2022
20:00 UTC+1

| Raja CA (Morocco) | 1–0 | (Guinea) Horoya |
|---|---|---|
| Moutouali 67' | Report |

Stade Mohammed V, Casablanca
Referee: Dahane Beida (Mauritania)

12 March 2022
16:00 UTC+0

| Horoya (Guinea) | 2–1 | (Morocco) Raja CA |
|---|---|---|
| Mandela 26'; Barry 29' (pen.) | Report | Ahadad 19' |

General Lansana Conté Stadium, Conakry
Referee: Boubou Traore (Mali)
12 March 2022
20:00 UTC+1

| ES Sétif (Algeria) | 2–0 | (South Africa) AmaZulu |
|---|---|---|
| Benayad 11'; Djahnit 45+1' | Report |

Stade du 5 Juillet, Algiers
Referee: Haythem Guirat (Tunisia)

18 March 2022
18:00 UTC+2

| AmaZulu (South Africa) | 0–2 | (Morocco) Raja CA |
|---|---|---|
| | Report | Ahadad 6'; Haddad 76' |

Moses Mabhida Stadium, Durban
Referee: Joshua Bondo (Botswana)
18 March 2022
20:00 UTC+1

| ES Sétif (Algeria) | 3–2 | (Guinea) Horoya |
|---|---|---|
| Djahnit 47'; Benayad 87', 90+3' | Report | Baffour 25'; Sylla 59' |

Stade du 5 Juillet, Algiers
Referee: Youssef Sraïri (Tunisia)

1 April 2022
16:00 UTC+0

| Horoya (Guinea) | 1–1 | (South Africa) AmaZulu |
|---|---|---|
| Nikièma 45' | Report | Coulibaly 48' (o.g.) |

General Lansana Conté Stadium, Conakry
Referee: Mutaz Ibrahim (Libya)
3 April 2022
21:00 UTC+0

| Raja CA (Morocco) | 1–0 | (Algeria) ES Sétif |
|---|---|---|
| Hadhoudi 74' | Report |

Stade Mohammed V, Casablanca
Attendance: 43,651
Referee: Amin Omar (Egypt)

=== Group C ===
| Pos | Team | Pld | W | D | L | GF | GA | GD | Pts | Qualification | EST | CRB | ESS | GAL |
|---|---|---|---|---|---|---|---|---|---|---|---|---|---|---|
| 1 | (Tunisia) Espérance de Tunis | 6 | 4 | 2 | 0 | 12 | 2 | +10 | 14 | Advance to knockout stage | — | 2–1 | 0–0 | 4–0 |
| 2 | (Algeria) CR Belouizdad | 6 | 3 | 2 | 1 | 10 | 5 | +5 | 11 | Advance to knockout stage | 1–1 | — | 2–0 | 4–1 |
| 3 | (Tunisia) Étoile du Sahel | 6 | 1 | 3 | 2 | 4 | 7 | −3 | 6 | | 0–2 | 0–0 | — | 3–2 |
| 4 | (Botswana) Jwaneng Galaxy | 6 | 0 | 1 | 5 | 5 | 17 | −12 | 1 | | 0–3 | 1–2 | 1–1 | — |

Source: CAF
Rules for classification: Group stage tiebreakers
11 February 2022
17:00 UTC+1

| Étoile du Sahel (Tunisia) | 0–0 | (Algeria) CR Belouizdad |
|---|---|---|
| | Report |

Stade Hammadi Agrebi, Tunis (Note: Étoile du Sahel play their home matches at Stade Hammadi Agrebi, Tunis, instead of their regular home stadium Stade Olympique de Sousse, Sousse, which is undergoing renovation.)
Referee: Ibrahim Nour El Din (Egypt)
12 February 2022
14:00 UTC+1

| Espérance de Tunis (Tunisia) | 4–0 | (Botswana) Jwaneng Galaxy |
|---|---|---|
| Ben Romdhane 1', 29', 32'; Eduwo 86' | Report |

Stade Hammadi Agrebi, Tunis
Referee: Issa Sy (Senegal)

19 February 2022
18:00 UTC+2

| Jwaneng Galaxy (Botswana) | 1–1 | (Tunisia) Étoile du Sahel |
|---|---|---|
| Sesinyi 90+1' | Report | Coulibaly 14' |

Francistown Stadium, Francistown
Referee: Ahmad Imtehaz Heeralall (Mauritius)
19 February 2022
20:00 UTC+1

| CR Belouizdad (Algeria) | 1–1 | (Tunisia) Espérance de Tunis |
|---|---|---|
| Aribi 15' (pen.) | Report | Machmoum 82' |

Stade du 5 Juillet, Algiers (Note: CR Belouizdad play their group stage home matches at Stade du 5 Juillet, Algiers, instead of their regular home stadium Stade du 20 Août, Algiers, which did not meet CAF requirements.)
Referee: Mohamed Adel (Egypt)

26 February 2022
14:00 UTC+1

| Espérance de Tunis (Tunisia) | 0–0 | (Tunisia) Étoile du Sahel |
|---|---|---|
| | Report |

Stade Hammadi Agrebi, Tunis
Referee: Bakary Gassama (Gambia)
26 February 2022
18:00 UTC+2

| Jwaneng Galaxy (Botswana) | 1–2 | (Algeria) CR Belouizdad |
|---|---|---|
| Baruti 84' | Report | Merzougui 77', 90+3' |

Francistown Stadium, Francistown
Referee: Blaise Yuven Ngwa (Cameroon)

11 March 2022
20:00 UTC+1

| CR Belouizdad (Algeria) | 4–1 | (Botswana) Jwaneng Galaxy |
|---|---|---|
| Bakir 25' (pen.); Aribi 41'; Selmi 70'; Merzougui 90+1' | Report | Sesinyi 49' |

Stade du 5 Juillet, Algiers
Referee: Sabri Mohamed Fadul (Sudan)
12 March 2022
14:00 UTC+1

| Étoile du Sahel (Tunisia) | 0–2 | (Tunisia) Espérance de Tunis |
|---|---|---|
| | Report | Bedrane 66'; Ben Romdhane 77' |

Stade Hammadi Agrebi, Tunis
Referee: Mohamed Marouf Eid Mansour (Egypt)

19 March 2022
18:00 UTC+2

| Jwaneng Galaxy (Botswana) | 0–3 | (Tunisia) Espérance de Tunis |
|---|---|---|
| | Report | Eduwo 13', 64'; Iwuala 31' |

Francistown Stadium, Francistown
Referee: Pierre Atcho (Gabon)
19 March 2022
20:00 UTC+1

| CR Belouizdad (Algeria) | 2–0 | (Tunisia) Étoile du Sahel |
|---|---|---|
| Bouchar 3'; Belkhir 18' | Report |

Stade du 5 Juillet, Algiers
Referee: Redouane Jiyed (Morocco)

1 April 2022
14:00 UTC+1

| Étoile du Sahel (Tunisia) | 3–2 | (Botswana) Jwaneng Galaxy |
|---|---|---|
| Kombe 9'; Jemmali 70'; Amri 82' | Report | Baruti 80', 85' |

Stade Hammadi Agrebi, Tunis
Referee: Messie Nkounkou (Congo)
2 April 2022
22:00 UTC+1

| Espérance de Tunis (Tunisia) | 2–1 | (Algeria) CR Belouizdad |
|---|---|---|
| Bougrine 13'; Iwuala 17' | Report | Mrezigue 2' |

Stade Hammadi Agrebi, Tunis
Referee: Abdel Aziz Mohamed Bouh (Mauritania)

=== Group D ===
| Pos | Team | Pld | W | D | L | GF | GA | GD | Pts | Qualification | WAC | PET | ZAM | SAG |
|---|---|---|---|---|---|---|---|---|---|---|---|---|---|---|
| 1 | (Morocco) Wydad AC | 6 | 5 | 0 | 1 | 15 | 5 | +10 | 15 | Advance to knockout stage | — | 5–1 | 3–1 | 3–0 |
| 2 | (Angola) Petro de Luanda | 6 | 3 | 2 | 1 | 9 | 8 | +1 | 11 | Advance to knockout stage | 2–1 | — | 0–0 | 3–0 |
| 3 | (Egypt) Zamalek | 6 | 0 | 4 | 2 | 3 | 6 | −3 | 4 | | 0–1 | 2–2 | — | 0–0 |
| 4 | (Angola) Sagrada Esperança | 6 | 0 | 2 | 4 | 1 | 9 | −8 | 2 | | 1–2 | 0–1 | 0–0 | — |

Source: CAF
Rules for classification: Group stage tiebreakers
11 February 2022
20:00 UTC+1

| Wydad AC (Morocco) | 3–0 | (Angola) Sagrada Esperança |
|---|---|---|
| Dari 45+2'; Jabrane 52' (pen.); Mbenza 72' | Report |

Stade Mohammed V, Casablanca
Referee: Daniel Nii Laryea (Ghana)
12 February 2022
18:00 UTC+2

| Zamalek (Egypt) | 2–2 | (Angola) Petro de Luanda |
|---|---|---|
| Obama 57'; El-Wensh 90+5' | Report | Gleison 22'; Vidinho 36' |

Cairo International Stadium, Cairo
Referee: Jean Jacques Ndala Ngambo (DR Congo)

19 February 2022
14:00 UTC+1

| Petro de Luanda (Angola) | 2–1 | (Morocco) Wydad AC |
|---|---|---|
| Azulão 41'; Yano 68' | Report | Daoudi 59' |

Estádio 11 de Novembro, Luanda
Referee: Peter Waweru (Kenya)
19 February 2022
17:00 UTC+1

| Sagrada Esperança (Angola) | 0–0 | (Egypt) Zamalek |
|---|---|---|
| | Report |

Estádio 11 de Novembro, Luanda (Note: Sagrada Esperança play their group stage home matches at Estádio 11 de Novembro, Luanda, instead of their regular home stadium Estádio Sagrada Esperança, Dundo, which did not meet CAF requirements.)
Referee: Bernard Camille (Seychelles)

26 February 2022
17:00 UTC+1

| Sagrada Esperança (Angola) | 0–1 | (Angola) Petro de Luanda |
|---|---|---|
| | Report | Azulão 33' (pen.) |

Estádio 11 de Novembro, Luanda
Referee: Eugene Mdluli (South Africa)
26 February 2022
20:00 UTC+1

| Wydad AC (Morocco) | 3–1 | (Egypt) Zamalek |
|---|---|---|
| El Moutaraji 27'; Farhane 37'; Jabrane 88' | Report | Zizo 3' |

Stade Mohammed V, Casablanca
Referee: Sadok Selmi (Tunisia)

11 March 2022
18:00 UTC+2

| Zamalek (Egypt) | 0–1 | (Morocco) Wydad AC |
|---|---|---|
| | Report | Jabrane 48' (pen.) |

Cairo International Stadium, Cairo
Referee: Pacifique Ndabihawenimana (Burundi)
12 March 2022
17:00 UTC+1

| Petro de Luanda (Angola) | 3–0 | (Angola) Sagrada Esperança |
|---|---|---|
| Azulão 1', 44'; Castro 90+5' (pen.) | Report |

Estádio 11 de Novembro, Luanda
Referee: Janny Sikazwe (Zambia)

19 March 2022
14:00 UTC+1

| Petro de Luanda (Angola) | 0–0 | (Egypt) Zamalek |
|---|---|---|
| | Report |

Estádio 11 de Novembro, Luanda
Referee: Blaise Yuven Ngwa (Cameroon)
19 March 2022
20:00 UTC+1

| Sagrada Esperança (Angola) | 1–2 | (Morocco) Wydad AC |
|---|---|---|
| Paciência 30' | Report | El Moutaraji 82'; Tsoumou 90+5' |

Estádio 11 de Novembro, Luanda
Referee: Mahmood Ismail (Sudan)

1 April 2022
18:00 UTC+2

| Zamalek (Egypt) | 0–0 | (Angola) Sagrada Esperança |
|---|---|---|
| | Report |

Cairo International Stadium, Cairo
Referee: Celso Alvação (Mozambique)
2 April 2022
21:00 UTC+0

| Wydad AC (Morocco) | 5–1 | (Angola) Petro de Luanda |
|---|---|---|
| Tsoumou 11'; Dari 29'; El Moutaraji 32'; El Hassouni 56'; Ellafi 71' | Report | Pinto 63' |

Stade Mohammed V, Casablanca
Referee: Lahlou Benbraham (Algeria)
