= 2021–22 CAF Champions League knockout stage =

- Dates: 15 April – 30 May 2022

Tournament statistics
- Matches played: 13
- Goals scored: 28 (2.15 per match)

The 2021–22 CAF Champions League knockout stage started on 15 April with the quarter-finals and ended on 30 May 2022 with the final to decide the champions of the 2021–22 CAF Champions League. A total of eight teams competed in the knockout stage.

Times are listed in local times.

== Round and draw dates ==
The schedule was as follows.

Round	Draw date	First leg	Second leg
Quarter-finals	5 April 2022	15–16 April 2022	22–23 April 2022
Semi-finals	5 April 2022	6–7 May 2022	13–14 May 2022
Final	5 April 2022	30 May 2022	

== Format ==
Each tie in the knockout stage, apart from the final, was played over two legs, with each team playing one leg at home. The team that scored more goals on aggregate over the two legs advanced to the next round. If the aggregate score was level, the away goals rule was applied, i.e. the team that scored more goals away from home over the two legs advanced. If away goals were also equal, then extra time was not played and the winners were decided by a penalty shoot-out. In the final, which was played as a single match, if the score was level at the end of normal time, extra time was played and if the score was still level, the winners were decided by a penalty shoot-out. The mechanism of the draws for each round was as follows:

- In the draw for the quarter-finals, the four group winners were seeded, and the four group runners-up were unseeded. The seeded teams were drawn against the unseeded teams, with the seeded teams hosting the second leg. Teams from the same group cannot be drawn against each other, while teams from the same association can be drawn against each other.
- In the draws for semi-finals, there were no seedings, and teams from the same group or the same association could be drawn against each other. As the draws for the quarter-finals and semi-finals were held together before the quarter-finals were played, the identity of the quarter-final winners was not known at the time of the semi-final draw.

== Qualified teams ==
The knockout stage involves the 8 teams which qualify as winners and runners-up of each of the eight groups in the group stage.

Group	Winners	Runners-up
A	(South African Football Association) Mamelodi Sundowns	(Egyptian Football Association) Al Ahly
B	(Royal Moroccan Football Federation) Raja Casablanca	(Algerian Football Federation) ES Sétif
C	(Tunisian Football Federation) Espérance de Tunis	(Algerian Football Federation) CR Belouizdad
D	(Royal Moroccan Football Federation) Wydad AC	(Angolan Football Federation) Petro de Luanda

== Bracket ==
The bracket of the knockout stage was determined as follows:

Round	Matchups
Quarter-finals	(Group winners hosted second leg, matchups decided by draw, teams from same group cannot play each other): QF1; QF2; QF3; QF4
Semi-finals	(Matchups and order of legs decided by draw, between winners QF1, QF2, QF3, QF4): SF1; SF2
Final	Winners SF1 and SF2 faced each other to decide the champions

The bracket was decided after the draw for the knockout stage, which was held on 5 April 2022.

Quarter-finals
(Egyptian Football Association) Al Ahly	2	1	3
(Royal Moroccan Football Federation) Raja Casablanca	1	1	2
(Algerian Football Federation) ES Sétif	0	1	1
(Tunisian Football Federation) Espérance de Tunis	0	0	0
(Angolan Football Federation) Petro de Luanda	2	1	3
(South African Football Association) Mamelodi Sundowns	1	1	2
(Algerian Football Federation) CR Belouizdad	0	0	0
(Royal Moroccan Football Federation) Wydad AC	1	0	1

Semi-finals
(Egyptian Football Association) Al Ahly	4	2	6
(Algerian Football Federation) ES Sétif	0	2	2
(Angolan Football Federation) Petro de Luanda	1	1	2
(Royal Moroccan Football Federation) Wydad AC	3	1	4

Final
30 May – Casablanca
(Egyptian Football Association) Al Ahly	0
(Royal Moroccan Football Federation) Wydad AC	2

== Quarter-finals ==
The draw for the quarter-finals was held on 5 April 2022.

=== Summary ===
The first legs were played on 15 and 16 April, and the second legs were played on 22 and 23 April 2022.

Team 1	Agg.	Team 2	1st leg	2nd leg
Al Ahly (Egypt)	3–2	(Morocco) Raja Casablanca	2–1	1–1
ES Sétif (Algeria)	1–0	(Tunisia) Espérance de Tunis	0–0	1–0
CR Belouizdad (Algeria)	0–1	(Morocco) Wydad AC	0–1	0–0
Petro de Luanda (Angola)	3–2	(South Africa) Mamelodi Sundowns	2–1	1–1

=== Matches ===
16 April 2022
22:00 UTC+2

Al Ahly (Egyptian Football Association)	2–1	(Royal Moroccan Football Federation) Raja Casablanca
El Solia 13' (pen.); El Shahat 23'	Report	Zrida 45+1'

Al Ahly WE Al Salam Stadium, Cairo
Referee: Jean Jacques Ndala Ngambo (DR Congo)
22 April 2022
22:00 UTC+0

Raja Casablanca (Royal Moroccan Football Federation)	1–1	(Egyptian Football Association) Al Ahly
Ngoma 5'	Report	Abdelmonem 44'

Stade Mohammed V, Casablanca
Attendance: 105.000
Referee: Maguette Ndiaye (Senegal)

Al Ahly won 3–2 on aggregate.

15 April 2022
22:00 UTC+1

ES Sétif (Algerian Football Federation)	0–0	(Tunisian Football Federation) Espérance de Tunis
	Report

Stade du 5 Juillet, Algiers (Note: ES Sétif play their group stage home matches at Stade du 5 Juillet, Algiers, instead of their regular home stadium Stade 8 Mai 1945, Sétif, which did not meet CAF requirements.)
Referee: Victor Gomes (South Africa)
22 April 2022
22:00 UTC+1

Espérance de Tunis (Tunisian Football Federation)	0–1	(Algerian Football Federation) ES Sétif
	Report	Djabou 21'

Stade Hammadi Agrebi, Tunis
Attendance: 0 (close doors)
Referee: Redouane Jiyed (Morocco)

ES Sétif won 1–0 on aggregate.

16 April 2022
22:00 UTC+1

CR Belouizdad (Algerian Football Federation)	0–1	(Royal Moroccan Football Federation) Wydad AC
	Report	Mbenza 46'

Stade du 5 Juillet, Algiers (Note: CR Belouizdad play their group stage home matches at Stade du 5 Juillet, Algiers, instead of their regular home stadium Stade du 20 Août, Algiers, which did not meet CAF requirements.)
Referee: Pacifique Ndabihawenimana (Burundi)
23 April 2022
22:00 UTC+0

Wydad AC (Royal Moroccan Football Federation)	0–0	(Algerian Football Federation) CR Belouizdad
	Report

Stade Mohammed V, Casablanca
Attendance: 103.000
Referee: Amin Omar (Egypt)

Wydad AC won 1–0 on aggregate.

16 April 2022
17:00 UTC+1

Petro de Luanda (Angolan Football Federation)	2–1	(South African Football Association) Mamelodi Sundowns
Azulão 16'; Yano 45+1'	Report	Lakay 6'

Estádio 11 de Novembro, Luanda
Referee: Janny Sikazwe (Zambia)
23 April 2022
18:00 UTC+2

Mamelodi Sundowns (South African Football Association)	1−1	(Angolan Football Federation) Petro de Luanda
Onyango 49'	Report	Azulão 64' (pen.)

FNB Stadium, Johannesburg
Referee: Bamlak Tessema Weyesa (Ethiopia)

Petro de Luanda won 3–2 on aggregate.

== Semi-finals ==
The draw for the semi-finals was held on 5 April 2022 (after the quarter-finals draw).

=== Summary ===
The first legs were played on 7 May, and the second legs were played on 13 and 14 May 2022.

Team 1	Agg.	Team 2	1st leg	2nd leg
Al Ahly (Egypt)	6–2	(Algeria) ES Sétif	4–0	2–2
Petro de Luanda (Angola)	2–4	(Morocco) Wydad AC	1–3	1–1

=== Matches ===
7 May 2022
21:00 UTC+2

Al Ahly (Egyptian Football Association)	4–0	(Algerian Football Federation) ES Sétif
Tau 30', 90'; Mohamed 54'; Sherif 72'	Report

Al Ahly WE Al Salam Stadium, Cairo
Attendance: 25.000
Referee: Bamlak Tessema Weyesa (Ethiopia)
14 May 2022
20:00 UTC+1

ES Sétif (Algerian Football Federation)	2–2	(Egyptian Football Association) Al Ahly
Kendouci 45'; Benayad 61'	Report	Abdel Kader 2'; Sherif 90+2'

Stade du 5 Juillet, Algiers
Attendance: 60.000
Referee: Sadok Selmi (Tunisia)

Al Ahly won 6–2 on aggregate.

7 May 2022
14:00 UTC+1

Petro de Luanda (Angolan Football Federation)	1–3	(Royal Moroccan Football Federation) Wydad AC
Job 81'	Report	Azulão 16' (o.g.); Jabrane 45'; Mbenza 68'

Estádio 11 de Novembro, Luanda
Attendance: 48.000
Referee: Mustapha Ghorbal (Algeria)
13 May 2022
20:00 UTC+1

Wydad AC (Royal Moroccan Football Federation)	1–1	(Angolan Football Federation) Petro de Luanda
Farhane 28'	Report	Gleison 21'

Stade Mohammed V, Casablanca
Attendance: 60.000
Referee: Victor Gomes (South Africa)

Wydad AC won 4–2 on aggregate.

== Final ==
The final was played on 30 May 2022 at Stade Mohammed V, Casablanca.

30 May 2022
20:00 UTC+1

Al Ahly (Egypt)	0–2	(Morocco) Wydad AC
	Report	El Moutaraji 15', 48'

Stade Mohammed V, Casablanca
Attendance: 80,000
Referee: Victor Gomes (South Africa)
