= 2022 CAF Champions League final =

African football tournament final

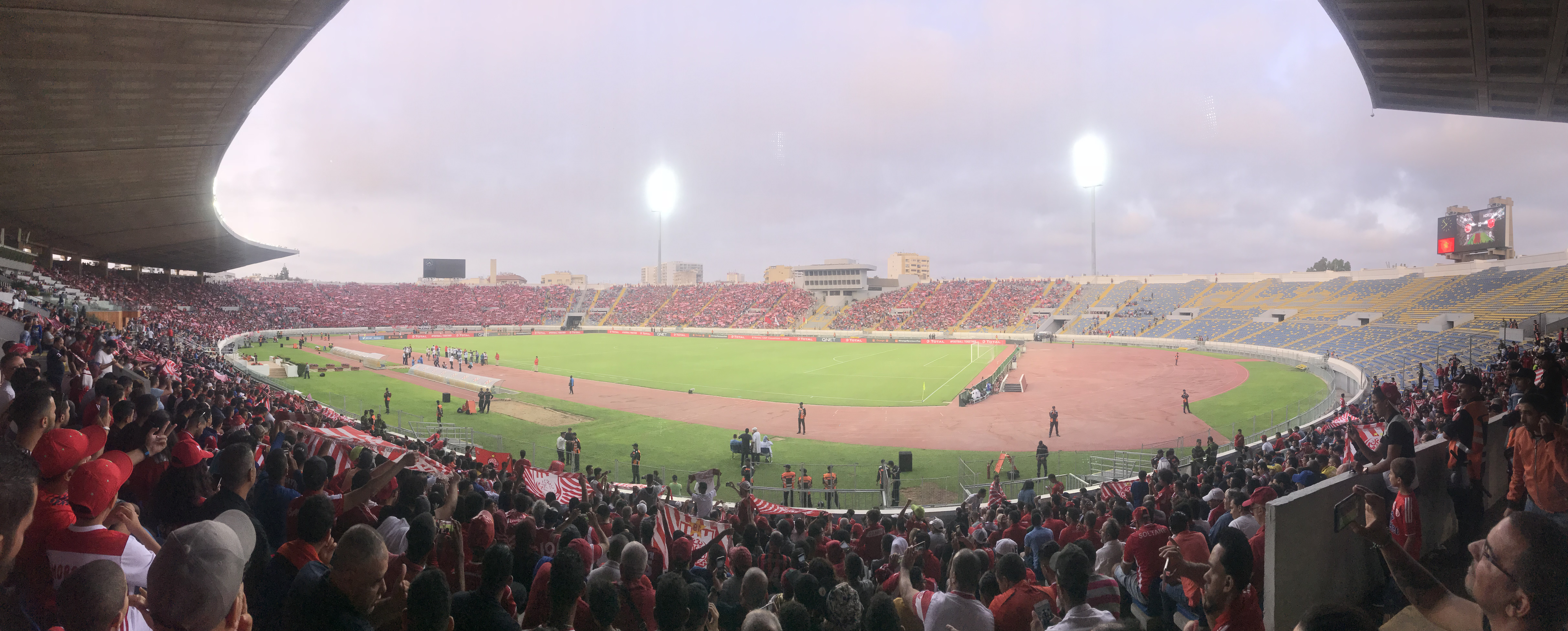
- Stade Mohammed V in Casablanca, Morocco, hosted the final.
- Event: 2021–22 CAF Champions League
Al Ahly	Wydad AC
(Egypt)	(Morocco)
0	2
- Date: 30 May 2022
- Venue: Stade Mohammed V, Casablanca, Morocco
- Man of the Match: Zouhair El Moutaraji (Wydad AC)
- Referee: Victor Gomes (South Africa)
- Attendance: 80,000
- Weather: Fair; 15 °C (59 °F); 64% humidity

The 2022 CAF Champions League final was the final match of the 2021–22 CAF Champions League, the 58th season of Africa's premier club football tournament organised by CAF, and the 26th edition under the current CAF Champions League title. It was played at the Stade Mohammed V in Casablanca, in Morocco on 30 May 2022.

Wydad AC won the match 2–0 to clinch their third Champions League title.

As winners, they earned the right to play against the winners of the 2021–22 CAF Confederation Cup, RS Berkane, in the 2022 CAF Super Cup.

When Morocco won the right to host 2022 FIFA Club World Cup, Al Ahly took Morocco's slot as Morocco's Wydad AC took CAF slot which was decided by this match.

== Teams ==
In the following table, finals until 1996 were in the African Cup of Champions Club era, since 1997 were in the CAF Champions League era.

Team	Zone	Previous finals appearances (bold indicates winners)
(Egypt) Al Ahly	UNAF (North Africa)	14 (**1982**, 1983, **1987**, **2001**, **2005**, **2006**, 2007, **2008**, **2012**, **2013**, 2017, 2018, **2020**, **2021**)
(Morocco) Wydad AC	UNAF (North Africa)	4 (**1992**, 2011, **2017**, 2019)

== Venue ==
For the third consecutive year, the final was played as a single match at a pre-selected venue by CAF instead of a two-legged fixtures format, which was being used in the CAF competitions since 1966.

On 12 April 2022, Royal Moroccan Football Federation submitted its bid to host the match, while the Senegalese Football Federation bidding date is unknown.

Country	Stadium	City	Capacity	Notes
Morocco	Stade Mohammed V	Casablanca	45,891	Hosted matches at the 1988 African Cup of Nations, including the final and 2021 CAF Champions League Final
Senegal	Diamniadio Olympic Stadium	Dakar	50,000	

On 9 May 2022, Stade Mohammed V in Casablanca, Morocco was chosen by a CAF Executive Committee to host the final after the Senegalese Football Federation subsequently withdrew their bid.

== Road to the final ==
Note: In all results below, the score of the finalist is given first (H: home; A: away).

(Egypt) Al Ahly				Round	(Morocco) Wydad AC			
Opponent	Agg.	1st leg	2nd leg	Qualifying rounds	Opponent	Agg.	1st leg	2nd leg
Bye				First round	Bye			
(Niger) USGN	7–2	1–1 (A)	6–1 (H)	Second round	(Ghana) Hearts of Oak	6–2	0–1 (A)	6–1 (H)
Opponent	Result			Group stage	Opponent	Result		
(Sudan) Al Merrikh	3–2 (H)			Matchday 1	(Angola) Sagrada Esperança	3–0 (H)		
(Sudan) Al Hilal	0–0 (A)			Matchday 2	(Angola) Petro de Luanda	1–2 (A)		
(South Africa) Mamelodi Sundowns	0–1 (H)			Matchday 3	(Egypt) Zamalek	3–1 (H)		
(South Africa) Mamelodi Sundowns	0–1 (A)			Matchday 4	(Egypt) Zamalek	1–0 (A)		
(Sudan) Al Merrikh	3–1 (A)			Matchday 5	(Angola) Sagrada Esperança	2–1 (A)		
(Sudan) Al Hilal	1–0 (H)			Matchday 6	(Angola) Petro de Luanda	5–1 (H)		
**Group A runners-up**: Pos / Team / Pld / Pts; 1 / (South Africa) Mamelodi Sundowns / 6 / **16**; **2** / (Egypt) Al Ahly / **6** / **10**; 3 / (Sudan) Al Hilal / 6 / **4**; 4 / (Sudan) Al Merrikh / 6 / **4**; Source: CAF				Final standings	**Group D winners**: Pos / Team / Pld / Pts; **1** / (Morocco) Wydad AC / **6** / **15**; 2 / (Angola) Petro de Luanda / 6 / **11**; 3 / (Egypt) Zamalek / 6 / **4**; 4 / (Angola) Sagrada Esperança / 6 / **2**; Source: CAF			
Opponent	Agg.	1st leg	2nd leg	Knockout stage	Opponent	Agg.	1st leg	2nd leg
(Morocco) Raja Casablanca	3–2	2–1 (H)	1–1 (A)	Quarter-finals	(Algeria) CR Belouizdad	1–0	1–0 (A)	0–0 (H)
(Algeria) ES Sétif	6–2	4–0 (H)	2–2 (A)	Semi-finals	(Angola) Petro de Luanda	4–2	3–1 (A)	1–1 (H)

== Format ==
The final was played as a single match at a pre-selected venue, with the winner of semi-final 1 according to the knockout stage draw designated as the "home" team for administrative purposes. If scores were level after full time, extra time was played and if it was still level, the winners were decided by a penalty shoot-out (Regulations Article III. 28).

== Match ==
=== Details ===
30 May 2022
20:00 UTC+1

Al Ahly (Egypt)	0–2	(Morocco) Wydad AC
	Report	El Moutaraji 15', 48'

Stade Mohammed V, Casablanca
Attendance: 80,000
Referee: Victor Gomes (South Africa)

**Al Ahly**	**Wydad AC**

GK	1	(Egypt) Mohamed El Shenawy
RB	30	(Egypt) Mohamed Hany		(substituted off) 71'
CB	6	(Egypt) Yasser Ibrahim
CB	12	(Egypt) Ayman Ashraf
LB	21	(Tunisia) Ali Maâloul
RM	27	(Egypt) Taher Mohamed
CM	15	(Mali) Aliou Dieng	(yellow card) 56'	(substituted off) 84'
CM	8	(Egypt) Hamdy Fathy		(substituted off) 71'
LM	14	(Egypt) Hussein El Shahat		(substituted off) 52'
CF	23	(South Africa) Percy Tau
CF	35	(Egypt) Ahmed Abdel Kader		(substituted off) 52'
Substitutes:
DF	5	(Egypt) Ramy Rabia	(red card) 90+2'
FW	10	(Egypt) Mohamed Sherif		(substituted on) 52'
MF	11	(Egypt) Walid Soliman		(substituted on) 84'
GK	16	(Egypt) Ali Lotfi
MF	17	(Egypt) Amr El Solia		(substituted on) 71'
FW	18	(Egypt) Salah Mohsen		(substituted on) 71'
MF	19	(Egypt) Mohamed "Afsha" Magdy		(substituted on) 52'
DF	20	(Egypt) Mahmoud Wahid
DF	28	(Egypt) Karim Fouad
Manager:
(South Africa) Pitso Mosimane

GK	26	(Morocco) Ahmed Reda Tagnaouti
RB	22	(Morocco) Ayoub El Amloud
CB	3	(Morocco) Achraf Dari
CB	25	(Morocco) Amine Farhane	(yellow card) 44'
LB	14	(Morocco) Yahia Attiyat Allah
DM	15	(Morocco) Jalal Daoudi		(substituted off) 90+5'
DM	5	(Morocco) Yahya Jabrane
CM	19	(Morocco) Reda Jaadi		(substituted off) 90+1'
RF	10	(Morocco) Ayman El Hassouni		(substituted off) 90'
CF	9	(Republic of the Congo) Guy Mbenza		(substituted off) 84'
LF	7	(Morocco) Zouhair El Moutaraji		(substituted off) 83'
Substitutes:
MF	6	(Morocco) Anas Serrhat		(substituted on) 90+1'
MF	13	(Morocco) Abdellah Haimoud		(substituted on) 84'
FW	16	(Morocco) Hamza Asrir		(substituted on) 90+5'
FW	17	(Morocco) Badie Aouk		(substituted on) 90'
GK	27	(Morocco) Aissa Sioudi
DF	29	(Ivory Coast) Cheick Comara
MF	31	(Morocco) Hamza Ait Allal
FW	37	(Morocco) Mounsef Chrachem
FW	40	(Republic of the Congo) Juvhel Tsoumou		(substituted on) 83'
Manager:
(Morocco) Walid Regragui

Man of the Match:
Zouhair El Moutaraji (Wydad AC)

Assistant referees:
Zakhele Siwela (South Africa)
Souru Phatsoane (Lesotho)
Fourth official:
Hélder Martins de Carvalho (Angola)
Video assistant referee:
Bamlak Tessema Weyesa (Ethiopia)
Assistant video assistant referees:
Mohammed Abdallah Ibrahim (Sudan)
Haythem Guirat (Tunisia)

**Match rules**
- 90 minutes.
- Penalty shoot-out if scores level.
- Nine named substitutes, of which up to five may be used. (Note: Each team was only given three opportunities to make substitutions, excluding substitutions made at half-time.)

=== Statistics ===
First half
Statistic	Al Ahly	Wydad AC
Goals scored	0	1
Total shots	5	6
Shots on target	0	1
Saves	0	0
Ball possession	68%	32%
Corner kicks	3	1
Yellow cards	0	1
Red cards	0	0

Second half
Statistic	Al Ahly	Wydad AC
Goals scored	0	1
Total shots	9	5
Shots on target	2	2
Saves	1	2
Ball possession	64%	36%
Corner kicks	0	3
Yellow cards	1	0
Red cards	1	0

Overall
Statistic	Al Ahly	Wydad AC
Goals scored	0	2
Total shots	14	11
Shots on target	2	3
Saves	1	2
Ball possession	66%	34%
Corner kicks	3	4
Yellow cards	1	1
Red cards	1	0

== See also ==
- 2022 CAF Confederation Cup Final
- 2022 CAF Super Cup
- Al Ahly SC in international football
- Wydad AC in international football
