= Wydad AC in international football =

Sports club in Casablanca, Morocco

- Club: Wydad AC
- Most appearances: Walid El Karti (71)
- Top scorer: Fabrice Ondama; Yahya Jabrane (12 goals each)
- First entry: 1987 African Cup of Champions Clubs
- Latest entry: 2025–26 CAF Confederation Cup

Titles
- Champions League: 3: 1992; 2017; 2021–22
- Cup Winners' Cup: 1: 2002
- Super Cup: 1: 2018
- Afro-Asian Cup: 1: 1993

Wydad Athletic Club is a Moroccan professional sports club based in Casablanca. The club has gained entry to all international competitions on several occasions from 1941.

The competition in which Wydad AC has had the most success is the CAF Champions League (formerly known as the African Cup of Champions Clubs); they have won three titles, the first of which came in 1992. The other two victories came in 2017 and 2022. The club has also won the now-defunct Cup Winners' Cup in 2002; the first and only Moroccan team to win the competition, the Super Cup in 2018 and the Afro-Asian Club Championship in 1993, and being a finalist on eight occasions (three in CAF Champions League, three in Super Cup, one in CAF Cup and one in African Football League).

== CAF competitions ==
All results (home, away and neutral) list Wydad's goal tally first.

Colour key

Wins
Draws
Losses
Competition winners
Competition runners-up

Key

- a.e.t. = After extra time
- N = Neutral venue
- a = Away goals rule
- p = Penalty shoot-out

Wydad AC results in CAF competition
Season	Competition	Round	Opposition	Home	Away	Aggregate	Ref.
1987	African Cup of Champions Clubs	First round	(Mauritania) ASC Police	3–1	Walkover (Note: ASC Police were disqualified after 1st leg because its federation didn't pay the first round entry fee.)	3–1	
1987	African Cup of Champions Clubs	Second round	(Ghana) Asante Kotoko	1–1	0–2	1–3	
1991	African Cup of Champions Clubs	First round	(Niger) Sahel SC	3–1	0–0	3–1	
1991	African Cup of Champions Clubs	Second round	(Algeria) JS Kabylie	3–0	0–1	3–1	
1991	African Cup of Champions Clubs	Quarter-Finals	(Tunisia) Club Africain	1–0	0–2	1–2	
1992	African Cup of Champions Clubs	First round	(Mali) Real Bamako	2–0	1–2	3–2	
1992	African Cup of Champions Clubs	Second round	(Nigeria) Julius Berger	2–1	0–0	2–1	
1992	African Cup of Champions Clubs	Quarter-Finals	(Zambia) Nkana Red Devils	3–1	1–2	4–3	
1992	African Cup of Champions Clubs	Semi-Finals	(Ivory Coast) ASEC Mimosas	2–0	1–3	3–3 (a)	
1992	African Cup of Champions Clubs	Final	(Sudan) Al-Hilal	2–0	0–0	2–0	
1993	CAF Super Cup	Final	(Ivory Coast) Africa Sports	2–2, (3–5 p)			
1993	African Cup of Champions Clubs	First round	(Senegal) ASEC Ndiambour	3–1	1–2	4–3	
1993	African Cup of Champions Clubs	Second round	(Nigeria) Stationery Stores	3–1	1–4	4–5	
1994	African Cup of Champions Clubs	First round	(Togo) Semassi	6–1	0–2	6–3	
1994	African Cup of Champions Clubs	Second round	(Gabon) AS Sogara	0–1	0–2	0–3	
1998	African Cup Winners' Cup	Second round	(Cameroon) Union Douala	4–0	0–1	4–1	
1998	African Cup Winners' Cup	Quarter-finals	(Mozambique) Costa do Sol	6–3	1–1	7–4	
1998	African Cup Winners' Cup	Semi-finals	(Tunisia) Espérance de Tunis	2–0	1–4	3–4	
1999	CAF Cup	First round	(Libya) Al-Ahly Benghazi	1–1	2–0	3–1	
1999	CAF Cup	Second round	(Senegal) ASC Diaraf	2–1	1–1	3–2	
1999	CAF Cup	Quarter-finals	(Algeria) USM Alger	1–0	1–2	2–2 (a)	
1999	CAF Cup	Semi-finals	(Cameroon) Canon Yaoundé	1–1	1–1	2–2 (6–5 p)	
1999	CAF Cup	Final	(Tunisia) Étoile du Sahel	2–1	0–1	2–2 (a)	
2000	CAF Cup	First round	(Liberia) Saint Anthony	Walkover			
2000	CAF Cup	Second round	(Ghana) Cape Coast Dwarfs	2–1	0–2	2–3	
2001	CAF Cup	Second round	(Senegal) ASC Ndiambour	1–1	2–0	3–1	
2001	CAF Cup	Quarter-finals	(Algeria) JS Kabylie	0–1	0–2	0–3	
2002	African Cup Winners' Cup	First round	(Senegal) ASC SONACOS	3–0	0–0	3–0	
2002	African Cup Winners' Cup	Second round	(Ivory Coast) Alliance Bouaké	5–0	1–1	6–1	
2002	African Cup Winners' Cup	Quarter-Finals	(Democratic Republic of the Congo) Vita Club	3–1	0–1	3–2	
2002	African Cup Winners' Cup	Semi-Finals	(Algeria) USM Alger	0–0	2–2	2–2 (a)	
2002	African Cup Winners' Cup	Final	(Ghana) Asante Kotoko	1–0	1–2	2–2 (a)	
2003	CAF Super Cup	Final	(Egypt) Zamalek	1–3			
2003	African Cup Winners' Cup	First round	(Mauritania) ASC Nasr	2–0	0–0	2–0	
2003	African Cup Winners' Cup	Second round	(Libya) Al Hilal	4–0	2–2	6–2	
2003	African Cup Winners' Cup	Quarter-Finals	(Zambia) Power Dynamos	1–0	1–2	2–2 (a)	
2003	African Cup Winners' Cup	Semi-Finals	(Tunisia) Étoile du Sahel	0–1	0–2	0–3	
2004	CAF Confederation Cup	First round	(Burkina Faso) Étoile Filante	0–0	1–0	1–0	
2004	CAF Confederation Cup	Second round	(Ivory Coast) Stella Club d'Adjamé	2–1	0–0	2–1	
2004	CAF Confederation Cup	Play-off round	(Ghana) Asante Kotoko	1–1	0–2	1–3	
2007	CAF Champions League	Preliminary round	(Mauritania) ASC Mauritel Mobile	4–0	1–2	5–2	
2007	CAF Champions League	First round	(Mali) Stade Malien	3–1	0–0	3–1	
2007	CAF Champions League	Second round	(Ivory Coast) ASEC Mimosas	0–0	0–2	0–2	
2007	CAF Confederation Cup	Play-off round	(Egypt) Ismaily	0–1	0–2	0–3	
2011	CAF Champions League	Preliminary round	(Ghana) Aduana Stars	3–0	0–1	3–1	
2011	CAF Champions League	First round	(Nigeria) Kano Pillars	2–0	0–0	2–0	
2011	CAF Champions League	Second round	(Democratic Republic of the Congo) TP Mazembe	Walkover (Note: TP Mazembe won 2–1 on aggregate, but were later disqualified for fielding an ineligible player in the first round. As a result, Wydad AC played against Tanzanian side Simba, which lost to TP Mazembe in the first round, in a play-off for a place in the group stage.)			
2011	CAF Champions League	Special play-off	(Tanzania) Simba	3–0			
2011	CAF Champions League	Group stage	(Egypt) Al-Ahly	1–1	3–3	2nd out of 4	
2011	CAF Champions League	Group stage	(Algeria) MC Alger	4–0	1–3	2nd out of 4	
2011	CAF Champions League	Group stage	(Tunisia) Espérance de Tunis	2–2	0–0	2nd out of 4	
2011	CAF Champions League	Semi-finals	(Nigeria) Enyimba	1–0	0–0	1–0	
2011	CAF Champions League	Final	(Tunisia) Espérance de Tunis	0–0	0–1	0–1	
2012	CAF Confederation Cup	First round	(Liberia) Invincible Eleven	4–1	2–0	6–1	
2012	CAF Confederation Cup	Second round	(Mali) Real Bamako	3–0	0–1	3–1	
2012	CAF Confederation Cup	Play-off round	(Ivory Coast) AFAD Djékanou	0–0	1–0	1–0	
2012	CAF Confederation Cup	Group stage	(Republic of the Congo) AC Léopards	3–1	1–1	3rd out of 4	
2012	CAF Confederation Cup	Group stage	(Mali) Stade Malien	1–1	3–3	3rd out of 4	
2012	CAF Confederation Cup	Group stage	(Mali) Djoliba	1–2	1–2	3rd out of 4	
2013	CAF Confederation Cup	First round	(Togo) AS Douanes	3–0	1–1	4–1	
2013	CAF Confederation Cup	Second round	(Mozambique) Liga Muçulmana	3–1	0–2	3–3 (a)	
2016	CAF Champions League	Preliminary round	(Niger) AS Douanes	2–0	1–2	3–2	
2016	CAF Champions League	First round	(Madagascar) CNaPS Sport	5–1	1–2	6–3	
2016	CAF Champions League	Second round	(Democratic Republic of the Congo) TP Mazembe	2–0	1–1	3–1	
2016	CAF Champions League	Group stage	(Ivory Coast) ASEC Mimosas	2–1	1–0	1st out of 4	
2016	CAF Champions League	Group stage	(Zambia) ZESCO United	2–0	1–1	1st out of 4	
2016	CAF Champions League	Group stage	(Egypt) Al-Ahly	0–1	0–0	1st out of 4	
2016	CAF Champions League	Semi-finals	(Egypt) Zamalek	5–2	0–4	5–6	
2017	CAF Champions League	First round	(Gabon) CF Mounana	1–0	0–1	1–1, (5–4 p)	
2017	CAF Champions League	Group stage	(Cameroon) Coton Sport	2–0	2–0	1st out of 4	
2017	CAF Champions League	Group stage	(Zambia) Zanaco	1–0	0–1	1st out of 4	
2017	CAF Champions League	Group stage	(Egypt) Al-Ahly	2–0	0–2	1st out of 4	
2017	CAF Champions League	Quarter-finals	(South Africa) Mamelodi Sundowns	1–0	0–1	1–1, (3–2 p)	
2017	CAF Champions League	Semi-finals	(Algeria) USM Alger	3–1	0–0	3–1	
2017	CAF Champions League	Final	(Egypt) Al-Ahly	1–0	1–1	2–1	
2018	CAF Super Cup	Final	(Democratic Republic of the Congo) TP Mazembe	1–0			
2018	CAF Champions League	First round	(Ivory Coast) Williamsville AC	7–2	0–2	7–4	
2018	CAF Champions League	Group stage	(South Africa) Mamelodi Sundowns	1–0	1–1	1st out of 4	
2018	CAF Champions League	Group stage	AS Togo-Port	3–0	0–0	1st out of 4	
2018	CAF Champions League	Group stage	(Guinea) Horoya AC	2–0	1–1	1st out of 4	
2018	CAF Champions League	Quarter-finals	(Algeria) ES Sétif	0–0	0–1	0–1	
2018–19	CAF Champions League	First round	(Senegal) ASC Diaraf	2–0	1–3	3–3 (a)	
2018–19	CAF Champions League	Group stage	(Ivory Coast) ASEC Mimosas	5–2	0–2	1st out of 4	
2018–19	CAF Champions League	Group stage	(South Africa) Mamelodi Sundowns	1–0	1–2	1st out of 4	
2018–19	CAF Champions League	Group stage	(Nigeria) Lobi Stars	0–0	1–0	1st out of 4	
2018–19	CAF Champions League	Quarter-finals	(Guinea) Horoya AC	5–0	0–0	5–0	
2018–19	CAF Champions League	Semi-finals	(South Africa) Mamelodi Sundowns	2–1	0–0	2–1	
2018–19	CAF Champions League	Final	(Tunisia) Espérance de Tunis	1–1	0–1	Abandoned (Note: With the score 1–0 in favor of Espérance de Tunis in the 59th minute, Walid El Karti scored a goal for Wydad Casablanca which was subsequently ruled offside by the linesman. Due to a failure of the video assistant referee system, a review of the decision could not be conducted. Believing the goal was valid, Wydad Casablanca protested the decision and the match was interrupted. After 80 minutes of stoppage, the referee ruled the match as a forfeit by Wydad Casablanca and awarded to Espérance de Tunis, securing them the CAF Champions League title. However, on 5 June 2019 the CAF Executive Committee ordered a replay of the second leg at a neutral venue, requiring Espérance de Tunis to return the trophy and medals. However, the decision to order a replay of the second leg was thrown out by the Court of Arbitration for Sport (CAS) on 31 July 2019, who required CAF to refer the case to its proper disciplinary structures for a decision. On 7 August 2019, Espérance de Tunis were again officially declared champions after the CAF Disciplinary Board ruled that Wydad Casablanca "is considered to have lost the game in the 2nd leg.")	
2019–20	CAF Champions League	First round	(Mauritania) FC Nouadhibou	4–1	2–0	6–1	
2019–20	CAF Champions League	Group stage	(Algeria) USM Alger	3–1	1–1	2nd out of 4	
2019–20	CAF Champions League	Group stage	(South Africa) Mamelodi Sundowns	0–0	0–1	2nd out of 4	
2019–20	CAF Champions League	Group stage	(Angola) Petro de Luanda	4–1	2–2	2nd out of 4	
2019–20	CAF Champions League	Quarter-finals	(Tunisia) Étoile du Sahel	2–0	0–1	2–1	
2019–20	CAF Champions League	Semi-finals	(Egypt) Al-Ahly	0–2	1–3	1–5	
2020–21	CAF Champions League	First round	(Mali) Stade Malien	3–0	0–1	3–1	
2020–21	CAF Champions League	Group stage	(South Africa) Kaizer Chiefs	4–0 (Note: The Wydad AC v Kaizer Chiefs match, originally to be played at Stade Mohammed V, Casablanca, was moved to Stade du 4 Août, Ouagadougou (Burkina Faso), due to restrictions related to the COVID-19 pandemic imposed by Morocco on travelers from South Africa out of concern of the variant 501.V2.)	0–1	1st out of 4	
2020–21	CAF Champions League	Group stage	(Angola) Petro de Luanda	2–0	1–0	1st out of 4	
2020–21	CAF Champions League	Group stage	(Guinea) Horoya AC	2–0	0–0	1st out of 4	
2020–21	CAF Champions League	Quarter-finals	(Algeria) MC Alger	1–0	1–1	2–1	
2020–21	CAF Champions League	Semi-finals	(South Africa) Kaizer Chiefs	0–1	0–0	0–1	
2021–22	CAF Champions League	Second round	(Ghana) Hearts of Oak	6–1	0–1	6–2	
2021–22	CAF Champions League	Group stage	(Angola) Sagrada Esperança	3–0	2–1	1st out of 4	
2021–22	CAF Champions League	Group stage	(Angola) Petro de Luanda	5–1	1–2	1st out of 4	
2021–22	CAF Champions League	Group stage	(Egypt) Zamalek	3–1	1–0	1st out of 4	
2021–22	CAF Champions League	Quarter-finals	(Algeria) CR Belouizdad	0–0	1–0	1–0	
2021–22	CAF Champions League	Semi-finals	(Angola) Petro de Luanda	1–1	3–1	4–2	
2021–22	CAF Champions League	Final	(Egypt) Al Ahly	2–0 (N) (Note: The 2022 CAF Champions League final was played at Wydad's home stadium, the Stade Mohammed V but this had been pre-arranged and it was technically a neutral venue.)			
2022	CAF Super Cup	Final	(Morocco) RS Berkane	0–2 (N)			
2022–23	CAF Champions League	Second round	(Nigeria) Rivers United	6–0	1–2	7–2	
2022–23	CAF Champions League	Group stage	(Democratic Republic of the Congo) Vita Club	1–0	0–0	1st out of 4	
2022–23	CAF Champions League	Group stage	(Algeria) JS Kabylie	3–0	0–1	1st out of 4	
2022–23	CAF Champions League	Group stage	(Angola) Petro de Luanda	1–0	2–0	1st out of 4	
2022–23	CAF Champions League	Quarter-finals	(Tanzania) Simba	1–0	0–1	1–1, (4–3 p)	
2022–23	CAF Champions League	Semi-finals	(South Africa) Mamelodi Sundowns	0–0	2–2	2–2 (a)	
2022–23	CAF Champions League	Final	(Egypt) Al Ahly	1–1	1–2	2–3	
2023	African Football League	Quarter-finals	(Nigeria) Enyimba	3–0	1–0	4–0	
2023	African Football League	Semi-finals	(Tunisia) Espérance de Tunis	1–0	0–1	1–1, (5–4 p)	
2023	African Football League	Final	(South Africa) Mamelodi Sundowns	2–1	0–2	2–3	
2023–24	CAF Champions League	Second round	(Guinea) Hafia	3–0	1–1	4–1	
2023–24	CAF Champions League	Group stage	(Botswana) Jwaneng Galaxy	0–1	1–0	3rd out of 4	
2023–24	CAF Champions League	Group stage	(Ivory Coast) ASEC Mimosas	1–0	0–1	3rd out of 4	
2023–24	CAF Champions League	Group stage	(Tanzania) Simba	1–0	0–2	3rd out of 4	
2025–26	CAF Confederation Cup	Second round	(Ghana) Ashante Kotoko	5–1	1–0	6–1	
2025–26	CAF Confederation Cup	Group stage	(Kenya) Neirobi United	3–0	1–0	1st out of 4	
2025–26	CAF Confederation Cup	Group stage	(Tanzania) Azam	2–0	1–0	1st out of 4	
2025–26	CAF Confederation Cup	Group stage	(Tanzania) Maniema Union	1–0	1–2	1st out of 4	

== Worldwide competitions ==
Wydad AC results in FIFA and CAF-AFC competition
Year	Competition	Round	Opposition	Home	Away	Aggregate	Ref.
1993	Afro-Asian Club Championship	Final	(Iran) PAS Tehran	2–0	0–0	2–0	
2017	FIFA Club World Cup	Second round	(Mexico) Pachuca	0–1 (a.e.t.)			
2017	FIFA Club World Cup	Match for fifth place	(Japan) Urawa Red Diamonds	2–3			
2022	FIFA Club World Cup	Second round	(Saudi Arabia) Al Hilal	1–1 (a.e.t.), (3–5 p)			
2025	FIFA Club World Cup	Group Stage	(England) Manchester City	0–2		4th out of 4	
2025	FIFA Club World Cup	Group Stage	(Italy) Juventus	1–4		4th out of 4	
2025	FIFA Club World Cup	Group Stage	(United Arab Emirates) Al-Ain	1–2		4th out of 4	

== UAFA competitions ==
Wydad AC results in UAFA competition
Season	Competition	Round	Opposition	First leg	Second leg	Aggregate	Ref.
1989	Arab Club Champions Cup	Group Stage	(Saudi Arabia) Al-Ettifaq	2–0		2nd out of 5	
1989	Arab Club Champions Cup	Group Stage	(Oman) Fanja SC	0–0		2nd out of 5	
1989	Arab Club Champions Cup	Group Stage	(Lebanon) Al-Ansar	2–0		2nd out of 5	
1989	Arab Club Champions Cup	Group Stage	(Tunisia) Étoile du Sahel	1–3		2nd out of 5	
1989	Arab Club Champions Cup	Semi-final	(Algeria) JS Kabylie	3–2			
1989	Arab Club Champions Cup	Final	(Saudi Arabia) Al-Hilal	3–1			
1992	Arab Elite Cup	Final Group	(Saudi Arabia) Al-Hilal	1–1		Champion	
1992	Arab Elite Cup	Final Group	(Morocco) Olympique Casablanca	1–1		Champion	
1992	Arab Elite Cup	Final Group	(Egypt) Al-Mokawloon	2–1		Champion	
2004–05	Arab Champions League	First round	(Bahrain) Riffa SC	1–0	2–1	3–1	
2004–05	Arab Champions League	Group stage	(Saudi Arabia) Al-Ahli Jeddah	1–1	1–1	1st out of 4	
2004–05	Arab Champions League	Group stage	(Algeria) NA Hussein Dey	3–0	1–1	1st out of 4	
2004–05	Arab Champions League	Group stage	(Tunisia) CA Bizertin	1–0	0–1	1st out of 4	
2004–05	Arab Champions League	Quarter-finals	(Saudi Arabia) Al-Hilal	0–1	1–1	1–2	
2005–06	Arab Champions League	Round of 32	(Libya) Al-Ittihad	2–1	3–1	5–2	
2005–06	Arab Champions League	Round of 16	(Saudi Arabia) Al-Ittihad Jeddah	0–2	2–0	2–2 (4–1 p)	
2005–06	Arab Champions League	Quarter-Finals	(Sudan) Al-Hilal	0–1	3–2	3–3 (a)	
2007–08	Arab Champions League	Round of 32	(Kuwait) Kazma SC	1–0	1–1	2–1	
2007–08	Arab Champions League	Round of 16	(Oman) Al-Oruba	3–2	4–1	7–3	
2007–08	Arab Champions League	Group stage	(Algeria) USM Alger	1–2	2–3	1st out of 4	
2007–08	Arab Champions League	Group stage	(Syria) Al-Taliya	3–1	2–0	1st out of 4	
2007–08	Arab Champions League	Group stage	(Egypt) Tala'ea El-Gaish	3–0	0–0	1st out of 4	
2007–08	Arab Champions League	Semi-finals	(Jordan) Al-Faisaly	2–1	0–0	2–1	
2007–08	Arab Champions League	Final	(Algeria) ES Setif	0–1	0–1	0–2	
2008–09	Arab Champions League	Round of 32	(Jordan) Shabab Al-Ordon	3–0	2–0	5–0	
2008–09	Arab Champions League	Round of 16	(Syria) Al-Ittihad Aleppo	0–1	2–0	2–1	
2008–09	Arab Champions League	Quarter-finals	(Jordan) Al-Wahdat	1–2	4–0	5–2	
2008–09	Arab Champions League	Semi-finals	(Tunisia) CS Sfaxien	1–1	2–0	3–1	
2008–09	Arab Champions League	Final	(Tunisia) Espérance de Tunis	0–1	1–1	1–2	
2018–19	Arab Club Champions Cup	First Round	(Libya) Al-Ahli Tripoli	1–1	1–1	2–2 (4–2 p)	
2018–19	Arab Club Champions Cup	Second Round	(Tunisia) Étoile du Sahel	0–0	0–1	0–1	
2019–20	Arab Club Champions Cup	First Round	(Sudan) Al-Merrikh	1–1	2–0	3–1	
2019–20	Arab Club Champions Cup	Second Round	(Morocco) Raja Casablanca	1–1	4–4	5–5 (a)	
2023	Arab Club Champions Cup	Group Stage	(Qatar) Al-Sadd	0–0		3rd out of 4	
2023	Arab Club Champions Cup	Group Stage	(Libya) Al-Ahli Tripoli	1–1		3rd out of 4	
2023	Arab Club Champions Cup	Group Stage	(Saudi Arabia) Al-Hilal	1–2		3rd out of 4	

== Statistics ==
=== By season ===
As of 3 December 2025

Key

- Pld = Played
- W = Games won
- D = Games drawn
- L = Games lost
- F = Goals for
- A = Goals against
- GS = Group stage
- PR = Preliminary round
- R1 = First round
- R2 = Second round
- PO = Play-off round
- R16 = Round of 16
- QF = Quarter-final
- SF = Semi-final

Key to colours and symbols:

W	Winners
RU	Runners-up

Wydad AC record in African football by season
Season	Competition	Pld	W	D	L	GF	GA	GD	Round
1987	African Cup of Champions Clubs	3	1	1	1	4	4	+0	R2
1991	African Cup of Champions Clubs	6	3	1	2	7	4	+3	QF
1992	African Cup of Champions Clubs	10	5	2	3	14	9	+5	W
1993	CAF Super Cup	1	0	1	0	2	2	+0	RU
1993	African Cup of Champions Clubs	4	2	0	2	10	8	+2	R2
1994	African Cup of Champions Clubs	4	1	0	3	6	6	+0	R2
1998	African Cup Winners' Cup	6	3	1	2	14	9	+5	SF
1999	CAF Cup	10	4	4	2	12	9	+3	RU
2000	CAF Cup	2	1	0	1	2	3	−1	R2
2001	CAF Cup	4	1	1	2	3	4	−1	QF
2002	African Cup Winners' Cup	10	4	4	2	16	7	+9	W
2003	CAF Super Cup	1	0	0	1	1	3	−2	RU
2003	African Cup Winners' Cup	8	3	2	3	10	7	+3	SF
2004	CAF Confederation Cup	6	2	3	1	4	4	+0	PO
2007	CAF Champions League	6	2	2	2	8	5	+3	R2
2007	CAF Confederation Cup	2	0	0	2	0	3	−3	PO
2011	CAF Champions League	15	5	7	3	20	11	+9	RU
2012	CAF Confederation Cup	12	5	4	3	20	12	+8	GS
2013	CAF Confederation Cup	4	2	1	1	7	4	+3	R2
2016	CAF Champions League	14	7	3	4	23	15	+8	SF
2017	CAF Champions League	14	8	2	4	14	10	+4	W
2018	CAF Super Cup	1	1	0	0	1	0	+1	W
2018	CAF Champions League	10	4	4	2	15	7	+8	QF
2018–19	CAF Champions League	14	6	4	4	19	12	+7	RU
2019–20	CAF Champions League	12	5	3	4	19	13	+6	SF
2020–21	CAF Champions League	12	6	3	3	14	4	+10	SF
2021–22	CAF Champions League	13	9	2	2	28	9	+19	W
2022	CAF Super Cup	1	0	0	1	0	2	−2	RU
2022–23	CAF Champions League	14	6	4	4	19	9	+10	RU
2023	African Football League	6	4	0	2	7	4	+3	RU
2023–24	CAF Champions League	8	4	1	3	7	5	+2	Grp
2025–26	CAF Confederation Cup	7	6	0	1	15	3	+12	TBD
Total		237	111	60	70	339	204	+132	

=== By competition ===
==== African competitions ====
As of 2 March 2024

CAF competitions
Competition	Seasons	Played	Won	Drawn	Lost	GF	GA	GD	Win%	Last season played
African Cup of Champions Clubs / CAF Champions League	16	159	74	39	46	225	128	+97	46.54	2023–24
African Football League	1	6	4	0	2	7	4	+3	66.67	2023
CAF Confederation Cup	4	24	9	8	7	31	23	+8	37.50	2013
CAF Super Cup	4	4	1	1	2	4	7	−3	25.00	2022
African Cup Winners' Cup (defunct)	3	24	10	7	7	40	23	+17	41.67	2003
CAF Cup (defunct)	3	16	6	5	5	17	16	+1	37.50	2001
Total	31	233	104	60	69	324	201	+123	44.64	

==== Worldwide competitions ====
As of 3 December 2025

CAF-AFC and FIFA competitions
Competition	Seasons	Played	Won	Drawn	Lost	GF	GA	GD	Win%	Last season played
FIFA Club World Cup	3	6	0	1	5	5	8	−3	0.00	2025
Afro-Asian Club Championship (defunct)	1	2	1	1	0	2	0	+2	50.00	1993
Total	4	8	1	2	5	7	8	−1	12.50	

==== Arabian competitions ====
As of 2 August 2023

UAFA competitions
Competition	Seasons	Played	Won	Drawn	Lost	GF	GA	GD	Win%	Last season played
Arab Club Champions Cup	8	57	25	18	14	82	51	+31	43.86	2023
Arab Elite Cup (defunct)	1	3	1	2	0	4	3	+1	33.33	1992
Total	9	60	26	20	14	86	54	+32	43.33	

== Statistics by country ==
As of 12 November 2023

=== CAF competitions ===
Country	Club	P	W	D	L	GF	GA	GD	W%
Algeria	JS Kabylie	6	2	0	4	6	5	+1	
Algeria	USM Alger	8	3	4	1	11	7	+4	
Algeria	MC Alger	4	2	1	1	7	4	+3	
Algeria	ES Sétif	2	0	1	1	0	1	−1	
Algeria	CR Belouizdad	2	1	1	0	1	0	+1	
Subtotal		22	8	7	7	25	17	+8	
Angola	Petro de Luanda	10	7	2	1	22	8	+14	
Angola	Sagrada Esperança	2	2	0	0	5	1	+4	
Subtotal		12	9	2	1	27	9	+18	
Botswana	Jwaneng Galaxy	2	1	0	1	1	1	0	
Subtotal		2	1	0	1	1	1	0	
Burkina Faso	Étoile Filante	2	1	1	0	1	0	+1	
Subtotal		2	1	1	0	1	0	+1	
Cameroon	Union Douala	2	1	0	1	4	1	+3	
Cameroon	Canon Yaoundé	2	0	2	0	2	2	0	
Cameroon	Coton Sport	2	2	0	0	4	0	+4	
Subtotal		6	3	2	1	10	3	+7	
(Republic of the Congo) Congo	AC Léopards	2	1	1	0	4	2	+2	
Subtotal		2	1	1	0	4	2	+2	
(Democratic Republic of the Congo) DR Congo	AS Vita Club	4	2	1	1	4	2	+2	
(Democratic Republic of the Congo) DR Congo	TP Mazembe	3	2	1	0	4	1	+3	
Subtotal		7	4	2	1	8	3	+5	
Egypt	Zamalek	5	3	0	2	10	10	0	
Egypt	Ismaily	2	0	0	2	0	3	−3	
Egypt	Al Ahly	13	3	5	5	13	16	−3	
Subtotal		20	6	5	9	23	29	−6	
Gabon	AS Sogara	2	0	0	2	0	3	−3	
Gabon	CF Mounana	2	1	0	1	1	1	0	
Subtotal		4	1	0	3	1	4	−3	
Ghana	Asante Kotoko	6	1	2	3	4	8	−4	
Ghana	Cape Coast Dwarfs	2	1	0	1	2	3	−1	
Ghana	Aduana Stars	2	1	0	1	3	1	+2	
Ghana	Hearts of Oak	2	1	0	1	6	2	+4	
Subtotal		12	4	2	6	15	14	+1	
Guinea	Horoya AC	6	3	3	0	10	1	+9	
Guinea	Hafia FC	2	1	1	0	4	1	+3	
Subtotal		8	4	4	0	14	2	+12	
Ivory Coast	ASEC Mimosas	10	5	1	4	12	11	+1	
Ivory Coast	Africa Sports	1	0	1	0	2	2	0	
Ivory Coast	Alliance Bouaké	2	1	1	0	6	1	+5	
Ivory Coast	Stella Club d'Adjamé	2	1	1	0	2	1	+1	
Ivory Coast	AFAD Djékanou	2	1	1	0	1	0	+1	
Ivory Coast	Williamsville AC	2	1	0	1	7	4	+3	
Subtotal		19	9	5	5	30	19	+11	
Liberia	Invincible Eleven	2	2	0	0	6	1	+5	
Subtotal		2	2	0	0	6	1	+5	
Libya	Al-Ahly Benghazi	2	1	1	0	3	1	+2	
Libya	Al Hilal	2	1	1	0	6	2	+4	
Subtotal		4	2	2	0	9	3	+6	
Madagascar	CNaPS Sport	2	1	0	1	6	3	+3	
Subtotal		2	1	0	1	6	3	+3	
Mali	AS Real Bamako	4	2	0	2	6	4	+2	
Mali	Stade Malien	6	2	3	1	10	6	+4	
Mali	Djoliba AC	2	0	0	2	2	4	−2	
Subtotal		12	4	3	5	18	14	+4	
Mauritania	ASC Police	1	1	0	0	3	1	+2	
Mauritania	ASC Nasr	2	1	1	0	2	0	+2	
Mauritania	ASC Mauritel Mobile	2	1	0	1	5	2	+3	
Mauritania	FC Nouadhibou	2	2	0	0	6	1	+5	
Subtotal		7	5	1	1	16	4	+12	
Morocco	RS Berkane	1	0	0	1	0	2	−2	
Subtotal		1	0	0	1	0	2	−2	
Mozambique	Costa do Sol	2	1	1	0	7	4	+3	
Mozambique	Liga Muçulmana	2	1	0	1	3	3	0	
Subtotal		4	2	1	1	10	7	+3	
Niger	Sahel SC	2	1	1	0	3	1	+2	
Niger	AS Douanes	2	1	0	1	3	2	+1	
Subtotal		4	2	1	1	6	3	+3	
Nigeria	Julius Berger	2	1	1	0	2	1	+1	
Nigeria	Stationery Stores	2	1	0	1	4	5	−1	
Nigeria	Kano Pillars	2	1	1	0	2	0	+2	
Nigeria	Enyimba	4	3	1	0	5	0	+5	
Nigeria	Lobi Stars	2	1	1	0	1	0	+1	
Nigeria	Rivers United	2	1	0	1	7	2	+5	
Subtotal		14	8	4	2	21	8	+13	
Senegal	ASEC Ndiambour	4	2	1	1	7	4	+3	
Senegal	ASC Diaraf	4	2	1	1	6	5	+1	
Senegal	ASC SONACOS	2	1	1	0	3	0	+3	
Subtotal		10	5	3	2	16	9	+7	
South Africa	Mamelodi Sundowns	14	5	5	4	11	10	+1	
South Africa	Kaizer Chiefs	4	1	1	2	4	2	+2	
Subtotal		18	6	6	6	15	12	+3	
Sudan	Al-Hilal	2	1	1	0	2	0	+2	
Subtotal		2	1	1	0	2	0	+2	
Tanzania	Simba	5	3	0	2	5	3	+1	
Subtotal		5	3	0	2	5	3	+1	
Togo	Semassi	2	1	0	1	6	3	+3	
Togo	AS Douanes	2	1	1	0	4	1	+3	
Togo	AS Togo-Port	2	1	1	0	3	0	+3	
Subtotal		6	3	2	1	13	4	+9	
Tunisia	Club Africain	2	1	0	1	1	2	−1	
Tunisia	Espérance de Tunis	10	2	4	4	7	10	−3	
Tunisia	Étoile du Sahel	6	2	0	4	4	6	−2	
Subtotal		18	5	4	9	12	18	−6	
Zambia	Nkana Red Devils	2	1	0	1	4	3	+1	
Zambia	Power Dynamos	2	1	0	1	2	2	0	
Zambia	ZESCO United	2	1	1	0	3	1	+2	
Zambia	Zanaco	2	1	0	1	1	1	0	
Subtotal		8	4	1	3	10	7	+3	
Total		233	104	60	69	324	201	+123	44.64

== African competitions goals ==
Since 2003 CAF Super Cup as of game against Zamalek on February 7, 2003 except 2004 CAF Confederation Cup

Statistics correct as of game against ES Tunis on 1 November 2023.

Rank	Player	CCL	AFL	CWC	~~CAC~~ CCC	SC	Total
1	(Republic of the Congo) Fabrice Ondama	10	–	–	2	–	12
1	(Morocco) Yahya Jabrane	11	1	–	–	–	12
3	(Morocco) Ismail El Haddad	11	–	–	–	–	11
3	(Morocco) Mohamed Nahiri	11	–	–	–	–	11
5	(Morocco) Walid El Karti	10	–	–	–	–	10
6	(Morocco) Rachid Daoudi	9	–	–	–	–	9
6	(Morocco) Zouhair El Moutaraji	9	–	–	–	–	9
8	(Morocco) Ayoub El Kaabi	8	–	–	–	–	8
8	(Senegal) Bouly Sambou	8	–	–	–	–	8
10	(Morocco) Mouhcine Iajour	5	–	–	2	–	7
11	(Morocco) Reda Hajhouj	6	–	–	–	–	6

=== Hat-tricks ===
N	Date	Player	Match	Score	Time of goals
1	8 March 1994	(Morocco) Youssef Fertout	Wydad AC – Semassi	6–1	', ', '
1	9 May 1998	(Morocco) Redouane Allali	Wydad AC – Union Douala	4–0	', ', '
1	6 September 1998	(Morocco) Rabie El Afoui	Wydad AC – Costa do Sol	6–3	', ', '
1	7 March 2018	(Morocco) Ismail El Haddad	Wydad AC – Williamsville AC	7–2	74', 89', 90'
1	28 December 2019	(Morocco) Ayoub El Kaabi	Wydad AC – Petro de Luanda	4–1	29', 79', 90+3'p

=== Braces ===
N	Date	Player	Match	Score	Competition
1	1 June 2003	(Morocco) Mourad Erraji (1)	Wydad AC – Al Hilal	4–0	Cup Winners' Cup
2	17 May 2003	(Morocco) Mourad Erraji (2)	Al Hilal – Wydad AC	2–2	Cup Winners' Cup
3	28 January 2007	(Morocco) Rafik Abdessamad	Wydad AC – ASC Mauritel Mobile	4–0	Champions League
4	17 July 2011	(Morocco) Mouhcine Iajour (1)	Al-Ahly – Wydad AC	3–3	Champions League
5	30 January 2011	(Morocco) Mouhcine Iajour (2)	Wydad AC – Aduana Stars	3–0	Champions League
6	20 March 2011	(Republic of the Congo) Fabrice Ondama (1)	Wydad AC – Kano Pillars	2–0	Champions League
7	16 March 2013	Bobley Anderson	Wydad AC – AS Douanes	3–0	Confederation Cup
8	5 May 2013	(Republic of the Congo) Fabrice Ondama (2)	Wydad AC – Liga Muçulmana	3–1	Confederation Cup
9	12 March 2016	(Morocco) Reda Hajhouj	Wydad AC – CNaPS Sport	5–1	Champions League
10	12 March 2016	(Liberia) William Jebor	Wydad AC – CNaPS Sport	5–1	Champions League
11	24 September 2016	(Republic of the Congo) Fabrice Ondama (3)	Wydad AC – Zamalek	5–2	Champions League
12	24 September 2016	(Liberia) William Jebor	Wydad AC – Zamalek	5–2	Champions League
13	21 October 2017	(Morocco) Achraf Bencharki	Wydad AC – USM Alger	3–1	Champions League
14	7 March 2018	(Morocco) Amin Tighazoui	Wydad AC – Williamsville AC	7–2	Champions League
15	13 April 2019	(Morocco) Walid El Karti	Wydad AC – Horoya AC	5–0	Champions League
16	29 February 2020	(Morocco) Mohamed Nahiri	Wydad AC – Étoile du Sahel	2–0	Champions League
17	6 January 2021	(Libya) Muaid Ellafi	Wydad AC – Stade Malien	3–0	Champions League
18	24 October 2021	(Tanzania) Saimon Msuva	Wydad AC – Hearts of Oak	6–1	Champions League
19	30 May 2022	(Morocco) Zouhair El Moutaraji	Al-Ahly – Wydad AC	0–2	Champions League
20	16 October 2022	(Senegal) Bouly Sambou (1)	Wydad AC – Rivers United	6–0	Champions League
21	16 October 2022	(Morocco) Yahya Jabrane	Wydad AC – Rivers United	6–0	Champions League
22	1 April 2023	(Senegal) Bouly Sambou (2)	Wydad AC – JS Kabylie	3–0	Champions League

== Worldwide Competitions goals ==
Rank	Player	FCWC	FAAC	Total
1	(Morocco) Rachid Daoudi	–	1	1
1	(Morocco) Fouad Sayeh	–	1	1
1	(Morocco) Ismail El Haddad	1	–	1
1	(Morocco) Reda Hajhouj	1	–	1
1	(Morocco) Ayoub El Amloud	1	–	1
1	(South Africa) Thembinkosi Lorch	1	–	1
1	(South Africa) Cassius Mailula	1	–	1

== Arabian competitions goals ==
P	Player	Goals
1	(Morocco) Mohamed Madihi	8
2	(Morocco) Moussa Ndao	7
=	(Morocco) Mustapha Bidoudane	7
4	(Morocco) Rafik Abdessamad	5
5	(Morocco) Hicham Jouiâa	4
=	(Morocco) Hassan Nader	4
=	(Morocco) Abderrahim Saidi	4
8	(Morocco) Jean-Jacques Gosso	3
9	(Morocco) Mohammed Benchrifa	2
=	(Morocco) Hicham Louissi	2
=	(Morocco) Redallah Doulyazal	2
=	(Morocco) Abderrazak Sakim	2
=	(Morocco) Faouzi El Brazi	2
=	(Morocco) Ahmed Talbi	2
=	(Morocco) Samir Sarsare	2
=	(Senegal) Sadio Sow	2
=	(Algeria) Hamza Yacef	2
=	(Morocco) Mohamed Nahiri	2
19	(Morocco) Rachid Daoudi	1
=	(Morocco) Hassan Benabicha	1
=	(Morocco) Boujemaa Kessab	1
=	(Morocco) Mohamed Benhalib	1
=	(Morocco) Abdelhaq Ait Laarif	1
=	(Morocco) Youssef Meriana	1
=	(Morocco) Mohamed Borji	1
=	(Morocco) Hakim Ajraoui	1
=	(Venezuela) Wuiwel Isea	1
=	(Senegal) Ibrahima Toure	1
=	(Morocco) Salaheddine Saidi	1
=	(Morocco) Ayoub El Amloud	1
=	(Morocco) Ismail El Haddad	1
=	(Morocco) Ayman El Hassouni	1
=	(Morocco) Younes Menkari	1
=	(Morocco) Ayoub El Kaabi	1
=	(Liberia) William Jebor	1
=	(Morocco) Badie Aouk	1
=	(Morocco) Mohamed Ounajem	1
=	(Morocco) Khalid Oumansour	1
=	(Morocco) Saifeddine Bouhra	1
