= El-Sayed Attia =

Egyptian footballer (born 2001)

Personal information
- Full name: El-Sayed Muhammad Attia
- Date of birth: 1 January 2001 (age 25)
- Position: Goalkeeper

Team information
- Current team: Zamalek
- Number: 32

Youth career
- –2020: Zamalek

Senior career*
| Years | Team | Apps | (Gls) |
| 2020– | Zamalek | 1 | (0) |

International career
| | Egypt U20 | 0 | (0) |
- * Club domestic league appearances and goals

El-Sayed Muhammad Attia (Arabic: السيد محمد عطية; born 1 January 2001) is an Egyptian professional footballer who plays as a goalkeeper for Egyptian Premier League club Zamalek.
