= Terry Sackor =

Liberian footballer (born 1993)

Personal information
- Date of birth: 1 April 1993 (age 33)
- Position: Forward

Team information
- Current team: LPRC Oilers

Senior career*
| Years | Team | Apps | (Gls) |
- LPRC Oilers

International career^{‡}
| 2019– | Liberia | 6 | (1) |
- * Club domestic league appearances and goals ‡ National team caps and goals as of 5 June 2024

Terry Sackor (born 1 April 1993) is a Liberian footballer who plays as a striker for LPRC Oilers.
