= Tony Edjomariegwe =

Nigerian professional footballer

Personal information
- Date of birth: 1 September 1992 (age 34)
- Place of birth: Nigeria
- Height: 1.80 m (5 ft 11 in)
- Position: Forward

Senior career*
Years	Team	Apps	(Gls)
2009–2011	Crown Ogbomosho		
2012	Kwara United		
2012–2013	Shooting Stars		
2014	Nasarawa United	3	(1)
2015	Kano Pillars	7	(3)
2015–2019	OC Safi	86	(9)
2019-2021	Maghreb Tetouan	27	(9)
2021-2022	Al-Merrikh SC		
2022–2023	Al-Tadamon		
2023–2024	Al-Kawkab		
2025–2026	Al-Ghottah		
2026	Al-Saqer		
- * Club domestic league appearances and goals as of 18:02, 15 December 2020 (UTC)

Tony Edjomariegwe is a Nigerian professional footballer who plays as a forward.

On 13 August 2023, Edjomariegwe joined Saudi Second Division club Al-Kawkab. On 23 September 2025, Edjomarigwe joined Al-Ghottah from the same league.
