= Yaser Muzamel =

Sudanese footballer

Personal information
- Full name: Yaser Muzamel Muhamed Altayeb
- Date of birth: 15 April 1993 (age 33)
- Place of birth: Sudan
- Height: 1.79 m (5 ft 10 in)
- Position: Winger

Team information
- Current team: Al-Hilal SC
- Number: 9

Senior career*
Years	Team	Apps	(Gls)
2013–2014	Mouais SC (Shendi)		
2015–2020	Al-Ahly Shendi		
2020–	Al-Hilal SC		

International career^{‡}
2018–	Sudan	48	(7)
- * Club domestic league appearances and goals as of 11 October 2021 ‡ National team caps and goals as of 16 November 2026

Yaser Muzamel Muhamed Altayeb (born 15 April 1993) is a Sudanese professional footballer who plays as a winger for Al-Hilal SC and the Sudan national football team.
