= Dramane Nikièma =

Burkinabé footballer (born 1988)

Personal information
- Date of birth: 17 October 1988 (age 38)
- Place of birth: Bobo-Dioulasso, Burkina Faso
- Height: 1.78 m (5 ft 10 in)
- Position: Midfielder

Team information
- Current team: Horoya

Senior career*
Years	Team	Apps	(Gls)
2007–2009	Étoile Filante		
2009–2012	US des Forces Armées		
2013	Santos		
2013–	Horoya		

International career^{‡}
2012–	Burkina Faso	7	(0)
- * Club domestic league appearances and goals as of 18:14, 9 January 2022 (UTC) ‡ National team caps and goals as of 18:14, 9 January 2022 (UTC)

Dramane Nikièma (born 17 October 1988) is a Burkinabé professional footballer who plays as a midfielder for Horoya and the Burkina Faso national team.
