= Gleison (footballer, born 1995) =

Brazilian footballer

Personal information
- Full name: Gleison Wilson da Silva Moreira
- Date of birth: 23 June 1995 (age 31)
- Place of birth: Campinas, Brazil
- Height: 1.74 m (5 ft 9 in)
- Position: Forward

Team information
- Current team: Al-Khaldiya SC
- Number: 21

Youth career
- 2014: Red Bull Brasil

Senior career*
Years	Team	Apps	(Gls)
2015	Portimonense	13	(2)
2015–2019	Porto B	65	(16)
2016–2017	→ Paços de Ferreira (loan)	9	(0)
2017	→ Portimonense (loan)	14	(1)
2017–2018	→ Penafiel (loan)	31	(4)
2019–2021	Portimonense	0	(0)
2019–2020	→ Penafiel (loan)	22	(1)
2020–2021	→ Covilhã (loan)	30	(3)
2021– 2023	Petro de Luanda	0	(0)
2023 -	Al-Khaldiya SC	9	(0)
- * Club domestic league appearances and goals as of 28 February 2025 @ 16:01PM

Gleison Wilson da Silva Moreira (born 23 June 1995), known as Gleison, is a Brazilian football player who plays for Angolan club Petro de Luanda.

== Club career ==
He made his professional debut in the Segunda Liga for Portimonense on 1 March 2015 in a game against Farense.

He made his Primeira Liga debut for Paços de Ferreira on 13 August 2016, when he was a starter in a 1–1 draw against Moreirense.
