= Zouhair El Moutaraji =

Moroccan footballer (born 1996)

Personal information
- Date of birth: 1 April 1996 (age 30)
- Place of birth: Deroua, Morocco
- Height: 1.82 m (6 ft 0 in)
- Position: Winger

Team information
- Current team: Wydad AC
- Number: 77

Senior career*
Years	Team	Apps	(Gls)
2014–2024	Wydad AC	101	(19)
2016–2017	→ Hassania Agadir (loan)	11	(0)
2017–2018	→ OCK (loan)	24	(10)
2024	Al-Khaldiya SC	5	(3)
2024–2025	Pharco FC	15	(2)
2025–	Wydad AC	10	(0)

International career
2011–2013	Morocco U17	20	(9)
2014–2016	Morocco U20	5	(9)
- * Club domestic league appearances and goals as of 23 June 2026 (UTC)

Zouhair El Moutaraji (Arabic: زهير مترجي; born 1 April 1996) is a Moroccan professional footballer who plays for Wydad AC as a winger.

== Career ==
El Moutaraji started his career with Wydad AC at the age of 18 as a replacement for the injured Reda Hajhouj. He was linked with a move to Italy's Juventus as a junior, but the move never materialised.

In 2017, El Moutaraji was loaned to Olympique Club de Khouribga, where he scored ten league goals, including one against Wydad. He finished tied for fifth in the league goalscoring table.

El Moutaraji returned to Wydad after his loan spell and played several games for them in the 2018–19 CAF Champions League, scoring goals against Horoya and ASEC Mimosas. On 30 May 2022, El Moutaraji scored a brace for Wydad in a 2–0 win over Al Ahly in the 2022 CAF Champions League Final, and won the man of the match award.

On 30 June 2022, El Moutaraji was nominated for the 2022 CAF inter club player of the year awards.

Zouhair El Moutaraji announced his departure from Wydad AC during the 2024 winter Mercato, after the two parties reached a final agreement to end the relationship between them.

Zouhair wrote a post on his official Instagram account "The end of one stage and the beginning of another. 14 years with the components of Wydad Casablanca, during which I graduated through many age categories until I reached the first team, and achieved, thanks to God and then the support of the public, a lot of success, Achievements and coronations".

== Honours ==
Wydad AC

- Botola Pro: 2014–15, 2018–19, 2020–21, 2021–22
- CAF Champions League: 2021–22; runner-up: 2018–19, 2022–23

Al-Khaldiya

- Bahraini Premier League: 2023–24

Individual

- CAF Champions League Goal of the Year: 2021–22
- Wydad AC Goal of the Year: 2021–22
