= 2018–19 Wydad AC season =

Wydad AC
2018–19 season
- President: Said Naciri
- Manager: Faouzi Benzarti
- Stadium: Stade Mohamed V Stade Père Jégo; Prince Moulay Abdellah Stadium
- Botola: 1st
- Throne Cup: Semi-finals
- Club Championship: Second round
- Champions League: 2018: Quarter-finals 2019: Runners–up
- Top goalscorer: League: Michael Babatunde (8 goals); All: Mohamed Nahiri (12 goals)
- Average home league attendance: 17,393
Home colours	Away colours

The 2018–19 season is Wydad AC's 79th season in its existence and the club's 63rd consecutive season in the top flight of Moroccan football. They have competed in the Botola, the Champions League, Arab Club Champions Cup, and the Throne Cup.

== Competitions ==
=== Overview ===
Competition	Record								Started round	Final position / round	First match	Last match
Competition	G	W	D	L	GF	GA	GD	Win %	Started round	Final position / round	First match	Last match
Botola Pro	30	17	8	5	56	30	+26	56.67	—N/a	Winners	7 September 2018	9 June 2019
Throne Cup	4	3	1	0	7	3	+4	75.00	Round of 32	Semi-finals	2 September 2018	2 November 2018
2018 Champions League	6	2	3	1	4	2	+2	33.33	Group stage	Quarter-finals	17 July 2018	21 September 2018
2019 Champions League	13	6	4	3	19	11	+8	46.15	First round	Runners–up	15 December 2018	31 May 2019
Club Champions Cup	4	0	3	1	2	3	−1	0.00	First round	Second round	24 September 2018	8 November 2018
Total	57	28	19	10	88	49	+39	49.12				

Updated to match played 7 March 2020
Source: Competitions

== League table ==
Pos	Team	Pld	W	D	L	GF	GA	GD	Pts	Qualification or relegation
1	Wydad Casablanca (C)	30	17	8	5	56	30	+26	59	Qualification for Champions League
2	Raja Casablanca	30	15	10	5	56	36	+20	55	Qualification for Champions League
3	Hassania Agadir	30	12	9	9	30	22	+8	45 (Note: Head-to-head: Hassania Agadir: 3 points, +2 GD; Olympic Safi: 3 points, −2 GD.)	Qualification for Confederation Cup
4	Olympic Safi	30	12	9	9	37	38	−1	45	Participation in Arab Club Champions Cup (Note: Wydad Casablanca and Raja Casablanca are also participated in the Arab Club Champions Cup.)
5	IR Tanger	30	9	13	8	27	30	−3	40	Participation in Arab Club Champions Cup

Source: frmf.ma
Rules for classification: 1) Points; 2) Head-to-head points; 3) Head-to-head goal difference; 4) Goal difference; 5) Goals scored; 6) Fair-play points; 7) Play-off.
(C) Champions

=== Results summary ===
Overall								Home						Away					
Pld	W	D	L	GF	GA	GD	Pts	W	D	L	GF	GA	GD	W	D	L	GF	GA	GD
30	17	8	5	56	30	+26	59	12	3	0	37	11	+26	5	5	5	19	19	0

Last updated: 24 February 2020.
Source: Competitive matches

=== Results by round ===
Round	1	2	3	4	5	6	7	8	9	10	11	12	13	14	15	16	17	18	19	20	21	22	23	24	25	26	27	28	29	30
Ground																														
Result																														
Position																														

Source: Competitive matches
A = Away; H = Home; W = Win; D = Draw; L = Loss

=== Matches ===
Win Draw Loss

7 September 2018 Round 1	Olympic Safi	2–1	Wydad AC	Safi
20:00	Mansouri 15'; Koffi Boua 48'		El Hassouni 90+4' (pen.)	Stadium: Stade El Massira; Referee: Youssef Haraoui

22 November 2018 Round 2	Wydad AC	3–2	Youssoufia Berrechid	Casablanca
14:30	Aouk 17'; Saidi 28'; Nahiri 59'		Rachid 43'; Aina 89'	Stadium: Stade Mohamed V Referee: Taoufik Gourar

26 November 2018 Round 3	Wydad AC	3–0	Fath Union Sport	Casablanca
18:00	Babatunde 23'; Jebor 63'; Ounajem 90+1'			Stadium: Stade Mohamed V Referee: Abderrahim Yaacoubi

29 November 2018 Round 4	Rapide Oued Zem	0–0	Wydad AC	Oued Zem
14:00				Stadium: Stade Municipal; Referee: Hicham Tiazi

21 October 2018 Round 5	Wydad AC	2–0	Mouloudia Oujda	Casablanca
21:00	Saidi 58'; El Hassouni 82'			Stadium: Stade Mohamed V Referee: Jamal Belbassri

2 December 2018 Round 6	Moghreb Tétouan	1–1	Wydad AC	Tétouan
14:00	Bellaaroussi 34'		Dari 90+5'	Stadium: Stade Saniat Rmel; Referee: Mohamed Nhayeh

5 December 2018 Round 7	Wydad AC	3–0	Difaâ El Jadidi	Casablanca
16:00	Jebor 27'; Ounajem 59', 90+4'			Stadium: Stade Mohamed V Referee: Redouane Jiyed

11 November 2018 Round 8	Chabab Rif Al Hoceima	2–1	Wydad AC	Imzouren
14:00	Ruyman 43'; Fikri 44'		El Ghanjaoui 8' (o.g.)	Stadium: Stade municipal d'Imzouren; Referee: Samir Guezzaz

26 December 2018 Round 9	Wydad AC	2–1	Hassania Agadir	Casablanca
17:00	Tighazoui 29'; Babatunde 68' (pen.)		Oubila 49'	Stadium: Stade Père Jégo; Referee: Abderrahim Yaacoubi

6 January 2019 Round 10	Raja Casablanca	0–1	Wydad AC	Marrakesh
13:00			El Haddad 78'	Stadium: Marrakesh Stadium; Referee: Redouane Jiyed

9 December 2018 Round 11	Wydad AC	1–0	FAR Rabat	Casablanca
16:00	El Karti 43'			Stadium: Stade Mohamed V Referee: Yassin Bouslim

19 December 2018 Round 12	Olympique Khouribga	0–1	Wydad AC	Khouribga
15:00			Nahiri 78'	Stadium: Complexe OCP; Referee: Samir Guezzaz

2 January 2019 Round 13	Wydad AC	0–0	RSB Berkane	Casablanca
14:00				Stadium: Stade Père Jégo; Referee: Taoufik Gourar

24 January 2019 Round 14	IR Tanger	1–0	Wydad AC	Tanger
18:00	Naghmi 53'			Stadium: Stade Ibn Batouta; Referee: Samir Guezzaz

27 January 2019 Round 15	Wydad AC	3–1	Kawkab Marrakesh	El Jadida
14:00	Ounajem 48' (pen.); Dari 83'; Jabrane 85' (pen.)		Amimi 7'	Stadium: Stade El Abdi; Referee: Abderrahim Yaacoubi

7 February 2019 Round 16	Wydad AC	1–0	Olympic Safi	Casablanca
14:00	El Hassouni 76'			Stadium: Stade Père Jégo; Referee: Redouane Jiyed

20 February 2019 Round 17	Youssoufia Berrechid	1–2	Wydad AC	Berrechid
14:00	Sadil 78'		Comara 58'; Nahiri 80'	Stadium: Stade Municipal; Referee: Adil Zourak

17 February 2019 Round 18	Fath Union Sport	0–1	Wydad AC	Rabat
14:00			Jabrane 78' (pen.)	Stadium: Stade Moulay Abdellah; Referee: Daki Radad

24 February 2019 Round 19	Wydad AC	3–0	Rapide Oued Zem	Casablanca
14:00	El Hassouni 51'; Nahiri 66'; Noussair 75'			Stadium: Stade Mohamed V Referee: Abderrahim Yaacoubi

28 February 2019 Round 20	Mouloudia Oujda	2–3	Wydad AC	Oujda
14:00	Comara 55' (o.g.); Halhoul 85'		El Karti 1'; El Moutaraji 24'; Gaddarine 74'	Stadium: Honneur Stadium; Referee: Hicham Tiazi

4 March 2019 Round 21	Wydad AC	2–1	Moghreb Tétouan	Casablanca
14:00	El Hassouni 48'; El Haddad 66'		El Makaazi 64'	Stadium: Stade Père Jégo; Referee: Adil Zourak

28 March 2019 Round 22	Difaâ El Jadidi	1–1	Wydad AC	El Jadida
17:00	Msuva 68'		Babatunde 1'	Stadium: Stade El Abdi; Referee: Issa Sy (Senegal)

1 April 2019 Round 23	Wydad AC	6–1	Chabab Rif Al Hoceima	Casablanca
16:00	Nahiri 8' (pen.); Babatunde 47', 53'; Ounnajem 49'; El Karti 64'; El Moutaraji 89'		Bengoa 81'	Stadium: Stade Père Jégo; Referee: Yassin Bouslim

18 April 2019 Round 24	Hassania Agadir	2–1	Wydad AC	Agadir
16:00	Seyam 38'; El Berkaoui 59'		Babatunde 68'	Stadium: Stade Adrar; Referee: Adil Zourak

21 April 2019 Round 25	Wydad AC	2–2	Raja Casablanca	Marrakesh
16:00	El Karti 13'; Saidi 46'		Rahimi 21'; Iajour 72'	Stadium: Marrakesh Stadium; Referee: Redouane Jiyed

9 May 2019 Round 26	FAR Rabat	1–1	Wydad AC	Rabat
22:00	Berrahma 90+6' (pen.)		Jebor 12' (pen.)	Stadium: Prince Moulay Abdellah Stadium; Referee: Yassin Bouslim

4 June 2019 Round 27	Wydad AC	4–1	Olympique Khouribga	Casablanca
22:00	El Moutaraji 16', 46'; Aouk 30'; Nahiri 41'		Hajhouj 78'	Stadium: Stade Père Jégo; Referee: Mohamed Nhayeh

13 May 2019 Round 28	RSB Berkane	3–2	Wydad AC	Berkane
22:00	Farhane 9'; Namsaoui 53'; Fo-Doh Laba 79'		El Karti 5'; Dari 73'	Stadium: Stade Municipal de Berkane; Referee: Hicham Tiazi

17 May 2019 Round 29	Wydad AC	2–2	IR Tanger	Casablanca
22:00	Babatunde 82'; Comara 86'		Gaadaoui 41'; Naghmi 89'	Stadium: Stade Père Jégo; Referee: Redouane Jiyed

9 June 2019 Round 30	Kawkab Marrakesh	3–3	Wydad AC	Marrakesh
16:00	Amimi 13', 53' (pen.); Zahraoui 25'		Babatunde 1'; El Moutaraji 40'; Nahiri 85' (pen.)	Stadium: Marrakesh Stadium; Referee: Redouane Jiyed

== Moroccan Throne Cup ==
2 September 2018 Round of 32	Kawkab Marrakech	1–2	Wydad AC	Marrakesh
21:30	Dahbi 45'		Jebor 51'; Ounajem 64'	Stadium: Marrakesh Stadium

3 October 2018 Round of 16	Wydad AC	2–0	IR Tanger	Casablanca
21:00	Gaddarine 30'; Jebor 34'			Stadium: Stade Mohamed V Referee: Redouane Jiyed

7 October 2018 Quarter-finals	Wydad AC	2–1	Olympic Safi	Casablanca
21:30	Noussir 41'; Ounajem 49'		Attiatallah 87'	Stadium: Stade Mohamed V Referee: Abderrahim Yaacoubi

2 November 2018 Semi-finals	RSB Berkane	1–1 (a.e.t.) (6–5 p)	Wydad AC	Fez
17:00	Fo-Doh Laba 61'		Comara 71'	Stadium: Fez Stadium; Referee: Redouane Jiyed
	Penalties
	Namsaoui (penalty scored); Laachir (penalty scored); Fo-Doh Laba (penalty missed); Mokadem (penalty scored); Dayo (penalty scored); Ouidar (penalty scored); Aziz (penalty scored)		(penalty missed) Tighazoui; (penalty scored) El Hassouni; (penalty scored) Ounajem; (penalty scored) Aouk; (penalty scored) Gaddarine; (penalty scored) Nahiri; (penalty missed) Comara

== Arab Club Championship Cup ==
=== First round ===
24 September 2018	Wydad AC (Morocco)	1–1	(Libya) Al-Ahli Tripoli	Casablanca
19:00 UTC+1	Jebor 35' (pen.)	Report	Taqtaq 23'	Stadium: Stade Mohammed V Referee: Lahlou Benbraham (Algeria)

28 September 2018	Al-Ahli Tripoli (Libya)	1–1 (2–4 p)	(Morocco) Wydad AC	Sfax (Tunisia)
20:00 UTC+1	Saltou 32'	Report	Ounajem 11'	Stadium: Stade Taïeb Mhiri; Referee: Sadok Selmi (Tunisia)
	Penalties
	Taqtaq (penalty scored); Aleyat (penalty missed); Ablo (penalty scored); Maatouk (penalty missed)		(penalty scored) Jebor; (penalty scored) Nahiri; (penalty scored) Ounajem; (penalty scored) El Moutaraji

=== Second round ===
27 October 2018	Wydad AC (Morocco)	0–0	(Tunisia) Étoile du Sahel	Casablanca
19:00 UTC+1		Report		Stadium: Stade Mohammed V Referee: Turki Al Khudair (Saudi Arabia)

8 November 2018	Étoile du Sahel (Tunisia)	1–0 (1–0 agg.)	(Morocco) Wydad AC	Sousse
20:00 UTC+1	Msakni 57'	Report		Stadium: Stade Olympique de Sousse; Referee: Mohanad Qassim (Iraq)

== 2018 Champions League ==
=== Group stage ===
==== Group C ====
Pos	Team	Pld	W	D	L	GF	GA	GD	Pts	Qualification	WAC	HOR	MSD	TGP
1	(Morocco) Wydad AC	6	3	3	0	8	2	+6	12	Quarter-finals	—	2–0	1–0	3–0
2	(Guinea) Horoya	6	2	3	1	7	7	0	9	Quarter-finals	1–1	—	2–2	2–1
3	(South Africa) Mamelodi Sundowns	6	1	3	2	5	6	−1	6		1–1	0–0	—	2–1
4	AS Togo-Port	6	1	1	4	4	9	−5	4		0–0	1–2	1–0	—

Source: CAF
Rules for classification: Group stage tiebreakers

17 July 2018 3	Horoya (Guinea)	1–1	(Morocco) Wydad AC	Conakry
16:00 UTC+0	Mandela 29'	Report	Haddad 26'	Stadium: Stade du 28 Septembre; Referee: Hamada Nampiandraza (Madagascar)

28 July 2018 4	Wydad AC (Morocco)	2–0	(Guinea) Horoya	Casablanca
20:00 UTC+1	Comara 12'; Ounajem 18'	Report		Stadium: Stade Mohammed V Referee: Joshua Bondo (Botswana)

17 August 2018 5	Wydad AC (Morocco)	1–0	(South Africa) Mamelodi Sundowns	Casablanca
20:00 UTC+1	El Asbahi 56'	Report		Stadium: Stade Mohammed V Referee: Mehdi Abid Charef (Algeria)

28 August 2018 6	AS Togo-Port	0–0	(Morocco) Wydad AC	Lomé
16:00 UTC+0		Report		Stadium: Stade Municipal; Referee: Hélder Martins de Carvalho (Angola)

=== knockout stage ===
==== Quarter-finals ====
14 September 2018	ES Sétif (Algeria)	1–0	(Morocco) Wydad AC	Sétif
20:00 UTC+1	Diomande 16'	Report		Stadium: Stade du 8-Mai-1945; Attendance: 23,000; Referee: Eric Otogo-Castane (Gabon)

21 September 2018	Wydad AC (Morocco)	0–0 (0–1 agg.)	(Algeria) ES Sétif	Casablanca
20:00 UTC+1		Report		Stadium: Stade Mohammed V Attendance: 43,000; Referee: Bernard Camille (Seychelles)

== 2018–19 Champions League ==
=== First round ===
15 December 2018	Wydad AC (Morocco)	2–0	(Senegal) ASC Diaraf	Casablanca
19:00 UTC+1	Jebor 18'; Nahiri 86'	Report		Stadium: Stade Mohammed V Referee: Daniel Laryea (Ghana)

22 December 2018	ASC Diaraf (Senegal)	3–1 (3– (a) 3 agg.)	(Morocco) Wydad AC	Dakar
17:00 UTC+0	O. Guèye 18'; Diène 47'; Ba 88'	Report	Ounajem 54' (pen.)	Stadium: Stade Léopold Sédar Senghor; Referee: Juste Ephrem Zio (Burkina Faso)

=== Group stage ===
==== Group A ====
Pos	Team	Pld	W	D	L	GF	GA	GD	Pts	Qualification	WAC	MSD	LOB	ASE
1	(Morocco) Wydad AC	6	3	1	2	8	6	+2	10 (Note: Head-to-head away goals scored: Wydad AC 1, Mamelodi Sundowns 0.)	Quarter-finals	—	1–0	0–0	5–2
2	(South Africa) Mamelodi Sundowns	6	3	1	2	9	5	+4	10	Quarter-finals	2–1	—	3–0	3–1
3	(Nigeria) Lobi Stars	6	2	1	3	4	6	−2	7 (Note: Head-to-head goal difference: Lobi Stars +1, ASEC Mimosas –1.)		0–1	2–1	—	2–0
4	(Ivory Coast) ASEC Mimosas	6	2	1	3	6	10	−4	7		2–0	0–0	1–0	—

Source: CAF
Notes:

11 January 2019 1	Wydad AC (Morocco)	5–2	(Ivory Coast) ASEC Mimosas	Rabat
20:00 UTC+1	El Haddad 16'; Babatunde 48'; El Moutaraji 56'; El Karti 69'; Aouk 80'	Report	Coulibaly 44'; Bagaté 85'	Stadium: Prince Moulay Abdellah Stadium; Referee: Maguette N'Diaye (Senegal)

19 January 2019 2	Mamelodi Sundowns (South Africa)	2–1	(Morocco) Wydad AC	Pretoria
21:00 UTC+2	Zwane 8', 64'	Report	Nahiri 35'	Stadium: Lucas Masterpieces Moripe Stadium; Referee: Hélder Martins de Carvalho (Angola)

2 February 2019 3	Lobi Stars (Nigeria)	0–1	(Morocco) Wydad AC	Enugu
14:00 UTC+1		Report	Nahiri 20' (pen.)	Stadium: Nnamdi Azikiwe Stadium; Referee: Jean-Jacques Ndala Ngambo (DR Congo)

12 February 2019 4	Wydad AC (Morocco)	0–0	(Nigeria) Lobi Stars	Rabat
20:00 UTC+1		Report		Stadium: Prince Moulay Abdellah Stadium; Referee: Eric Otogo-Castane (Gabon)

9 March 2019 5	ASEC Mimosas (Ivory Coast)	2–0	(Morocco) Wydad AC	Abidjan
16:00 UTC+0	Touré 68', 89'	Report		Stadium: Stade Félix Houphouët-Boigny; Referee: Louis Hakizimana (Rwanda)

16 March 2019 6	Wydad AC (Morocco)	1–0	(South Africa) Mamelodi Sundowns	Rabat
17:00 UTC+1	Nahiri 63'	Report		Stadium: Prince Moulay Abdellah Stadium; Referee: Pacifique Ndabihawenimana (Burundi)

=== knockout stage ===
==== Quarter-finals ====
6 April 2019	Horoya (Guinea)	0–0	(Morocco) Wydad AC	Conakry
16:00 UTC+0		Report		Stadium: Stade du 28 Septembre; Referee: Eric Otogo-Castane (Gabon)

13 April 2019	Wydad AC (Morocco)	5–0 (5–0 agg.)	(Guinea) Horoya	Rabat
20:00 UTC+1	El Karti 20', 30'; Noussir 34'; Nahiri 59'; El Moutaraji 85'	Report		Stadium: Prince Moulay Abdellah Stadium; Referee: Bamlak Tessema Weyesa (Ethiopia)

==== Semi-finals ====
26 April 2019	Wydad AC (Morocco)	2–1	(South Africa) Mamelodi Sundowns	Rabat
20:00 UTC+1	Saidi 26'; Aouk 47'	Report	Ngcongca 42'	Stadium: Prince Moulay Abdellah Stadium; Referee: Joshua Bondo (Botswana)

4 May 2019	Mamelodi Sundowns (South Africa)	0–0 (1–2 agg.)	(Morocco) Wydad AC	Pretoria
15:00 UTC+2		Report		Stadium: Lucas Masterpieces Moripe Stadium; Referee: Hélder Martins de Carvalho (Angola)

==== Final ====
24 May 2019	Wydad AC (Morocco)	1–1	(Tunisia) Espérance de Tunis	Rabat
22:00 UTC+0	Comara 79'	Report	Coulibaly 44'	Stadium: Prince Moulay Abdellah Stadium; Referee: Gehad Grisha (Egypt)

31 May 2019	Espérance de Tunis (Tunisia)	Abandoned (Note: With the score 1–0 in favor of Espérance de Tunis in the 59th minute, Walid El Karti scored a goal for Wydad Casablanca which was subsequently ruled offside by the linesman. Due to a failure of the video assistant referee system, a review of the decision could not be conducted. Believing the goal was valid, Wydad Casablanca protested the decision and the match was interrupted. After 80 minutes of stoppage, the referee ruled the match as a forfeit by Wydad Casablanca and awarded to Espérance de Tunis, securing them the CAF Champions League title. However, on 5 June 2019 the CAF Executive Committee ordered a replay of the second leg at a neutral venue, requiring Espérance de Tunis to return the trophy and medals. However, the decision to order a replay of the second leg was thrown out by the Court of Arbitration for Sport (CAS) on 31 July 2019, who required CAF to refer the case to its proper disciplinary structures for a decision. On 7 August 2019, Espérance de Tunis were again officially declared champions after the CAF Disciplinary Board ruled that Wydad Casablanca "is considered to have lost the game in the 2nd leg.")	(Morocco) Wydad AC	Radès
22:00 UTC+1	Belaïli 41'	Report		Stadium: Stade Olympique de Radès; Attendance: 60,000; Referee: Bakary Gassama (Gambia)

== Squad information ==
=== Playing statistics ===
No.	Pos	Nat	Player	Total		Botola		Throne Cup		Champions League		Championship Cup	
No.	Pos	Nat	Player	Apps	Goals	Apps	Goals	Apps	Goals	Apps	Goals	Apps	Goals
Goalkeepers
26	GK	(Morocco) MAR	Ahmed Reda Tagnaouti	46	0	27	0	4	0	15	0	0	0
27	GK	(Morocco) MAR	Mohamed Manar	1	0	1	0	0	0	0	0	0	0
12	GK	(Morocco) MAR	Badreddine Benachour	2	0	2	0	0	0	0	0	0	0
Defenders
30	DF	(Morocco) MAR	Mohamed Nahiri	40	12	21	7	3	0	16	5	0	0
28	DF	(Morocco) MAR	Abdelatif Noussir	46	3	24	1	4	1	18	1	0	0
22	DF	(Morocco) MAR	Ayoub El Amloud	16	0	12	0	0	0	4	0	0	0
24	DF	(Morocco) MAR	Hamza El Wasti	3	0	2	0	0	0	1	0	0	0
29	DF	(Ivory Coast) CIV	Cheick Comara	44	5	23	2	4	1	17	2	0	0
2	DF	(Morocco) MAR	Anas El Asbahi	14	1	8	0	0	0	6	1	0	0
Midfielders
4	MF	(Morocco) MAR	Salah Eddine Saidi	42	4	21	3	4	0	17	1	0	0
6	MF	(Morocco) MAR	Brahim Nekkach	41	0	22	0	4	0	15	0	0	0
15	MF	(Morocco) MAR	Yahya Jabrane	24	2	16	2	0	0	8	0	0	0
17	MF	(Morocco) MAR	Badie Aouk	27	4	19	2	2	0	6	2	0	0
8	MF	(Morocco) MAR	Badr Gaddarine	28	2	14	1	4	1	10	0	0	0
14	MF	(Morocco) MAR	Faycal Haddadi	1	0	0	0	0	0	1	0	0	0
19	MF	(Morocco) MAR	Amin Tighazoui	31	1	19	1	2	0	10	0	0	0
18	MF	(Morocco) MAR	Walid El Karti	50	8	27	5	4	0	19	3	0	0
14	MF	(Morocco) MAR	Achraf Dari	43	3	26	3	4	0	13	0	0	0
20	MF	(Morocco) MAR	Ayman El Hassouni	40	5	22	5	2	0	16	0	0	0
Forwards
33	FW	(Ivory Coast) CIV	Mohamed Ouattara	6	0	5	0	0	0	1	0	0	0
9	FW	(Nigeria) NGR	Michael Babatunde	39	9	23	8	1	0	15	1	0	0
25	FW	(Nigeria) NGR	Gabriel Okechukwu	8	0	5	0	1	0	2	0	0	0
5	FW	(Morocco) MAR	Zouhair El Moutaraji	26	7	16	5	1	0	9	2	0	0
7	FW	(Morocco) MAR	Mohamed Ounajem	43	9	23	5	4	2	16	2	0	0
10	FW	(Liberia) LBR	William Jebor	23	6	15	3	4	2	4	1	0	0
11	FW	(Morocco) MAR	Ismail El Haddad	43	4	21	2	3	0	19	2	0	0
Players transferred out during the season

Last updated: 8 June 2019
Source: fr.soccerway.com

=== Goalscorers ===
Includes all competitive matches. The list is sorted alphabetically by surname when total goals are equal.

No.	Nat.	Player	Pos.	B 1	TC	CL 1	ACC	TOTAL
30	(Morocco)	Mohamed Nahiri	DF	7	0	5	0	12
7	(Morocco)	Mohamed Ounajem	FW	5	2	2	1	10
9	(Nigeria)	Michael Babatunde	FW	8	0	1	0	9
18	(Morocco)	Walid El Karti	MF	5	0	3	0	8
5	(Morocco)	Zouhair El Moutaraji	FW	5	0	2	0	7
10	(Liberia)	William Jebor	FW	3	2	1	1	7
20	(Morocco)	Ayman El Hassouni	MF	5	0	0	0	5
29	(Ivory Coast)	Cheick Comara	DF	2	1	2	0	5
4	(Morocco)	Salah Eddine Saidi	MF	3	0	1	0	4
17	(Morocco)	Badie Aouk	MF	2	0	2	0	4
11	(Morocco)	Ismail El Haddad	FW	2	0	2	0	4
14	(Morocco)	Achraf Dari	MF	3	0	0	0	3
28	(Morocco)	Abdelatif Noussir	DF	1	1	1	0	3
15	(Morocco)	Yahya Jabrane	MF	2	0	0	0	2
8	(Morocco)	Badr Gaddarine	MF	1	1	0	0	2
19	(Morocco)	Amin Tighazoui	MF	1	0	0	0	1
2	(Morocco)	Anas El Asbahi	DF	0	0	1	0	1
Own Goals				1	0	0	0	1
Totals				56	7	23	2	88
