= 2019 CAF Champions League final =

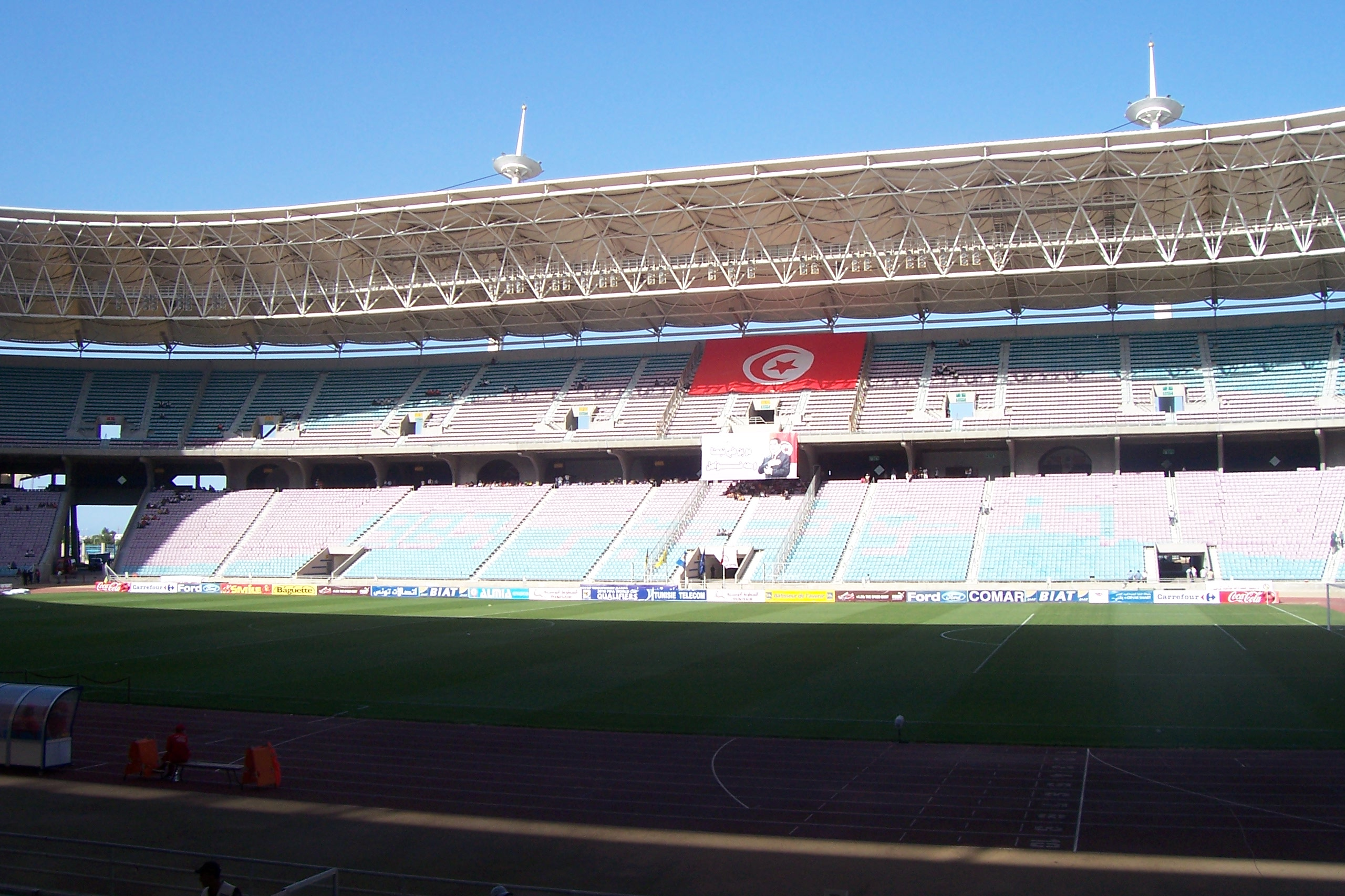
- ES Tunis were declared champions after the second leg in Radès was abandoned
- Event: 2018–19 CAF Champions League
Wydad AC	Espérance de Tunis
(Morocco)	(Tunisia)
1	2

First leg
Wydad AC	Espérance de Tunis
1	1
- Date: 24 May 2019
- Venue: Prince Moulay Abdellah Stadium, Rabat
- Referee: Gehad Grisha (Egypt)

Second leg
Espérance de Tunis	Wydad AC
1	0
- Match abandoned (Note: With the score 1–0 in favor of Espérance de Tunis in the 59th minute, Walid El Karti scored a goal for Wydad AC which was subsequently ruled offside by the linesman. Due to a failure of the video assistant referee system, a review of the decision could not be conducted. Believing the goal was valid, Wydad AC protested the decision and the match was interrupted. After 80 minutes of stoppage, the referee ruled the match as a forfeit by Wydad and awarded the win to Espérance de Tunis, securing them the CAF Champions League title. However, on 5 June 2019, the CAF Executive Committee ordered a replay of the second leg at a neutral venue, requiring Espérance de Tunis to return the trophy and medals. However, the decision to order a replay of the second leg was quashed by the Court of Arbitration for Sport (CAS) on 31 July 2019, who required CAF to refer the case to its proper disciplinary structures for a decision. On 7 August 2019, Espérance de Tunis was again officially declared champions after the CAF Disciplinary Board ruled that Wydad "is considered to have lost the game in the 2nd leg." On 18 September 2020, CAS dismissed Wydad's appeal over the final and confirmed Espérance de Tunis as champions.)
- Date: 31 May 2019
- Venue: Stade Olympique de Radès, Tunis
- Referee: Bakary Gassama (Gambia)

The 2019 CAF Champions League final was the final of the 2018–19 CAF Champions League, the 55th edition of Africa's premier club football tournament organized by the Confederation of African Football (CAF), and the 23rd edition under the current CAF Champions League title.

The final was originally contested in two-legged home-and-away format between Wydad AC from Morocco and defending champions Espérance de Tunis from Tunisia. The first leg was hosted by Wydad AC at the Prince Moulay Abdellah Stadium in Rabat on 24 May 2019, while the second leg was hosted by Espérance de Tunis at the Stade Olympique de Radès in Tunis on 31 May 2019.

Espérance de Tunis were initially declared winners following a refusal by Wydad AC to resume play following an issue with VAR, though CAF later ruled the second leg must be replayed in a neutral venue to decide the champions. However, the decision to order a replay was thrown out by the Court of Arbitration for Sport (CAS), who told the Confederation of African Football (CAF) to refer the case to its proper disciplinary structures for a decision, and on 7 August 2019, Espérance de Tunis were declared winners for a second time. As winners, they earned the right to play in the 2020 CAF Super Cup and the 2019 FIFA Club World Cup.

== Teams ==
In the following table, finals until 1996 were in the African Cup of Champions Club era, since 1997 were in the CAF Champions League era.

Team	Zone	Previous finals appearances (bold indicates winners)
(Morocco) Wydad AC	UNAF (North Africa)	3 (**1992**, 2011, **2017**)
(Tunisia) Espérance de Tunis	UNAF (North Africa)	7 (**1994**, 1999, 2000, 2010, **2011**, 2012, **2018**)

== Venues ==
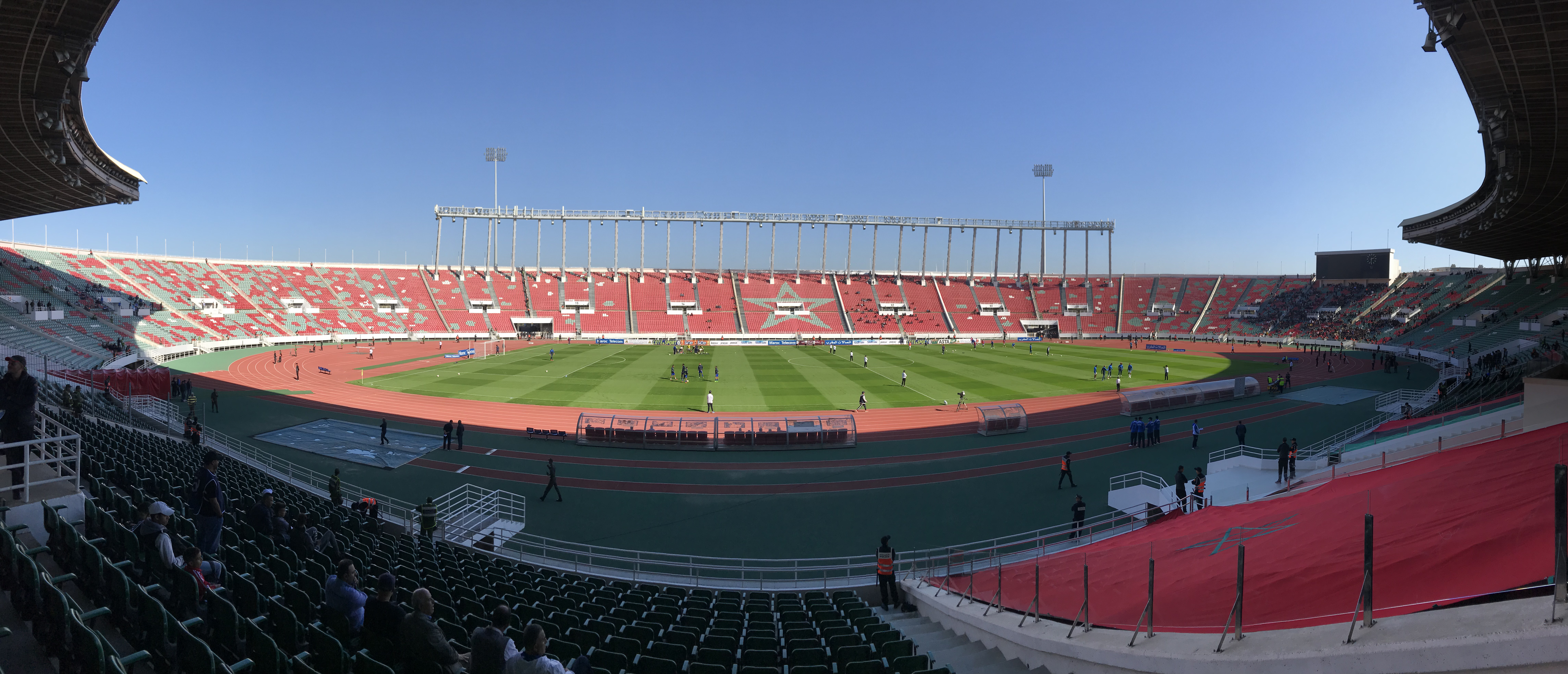
Prince Moulay Abdellah Stadium in Rabat, Morocco hosted the first leg.

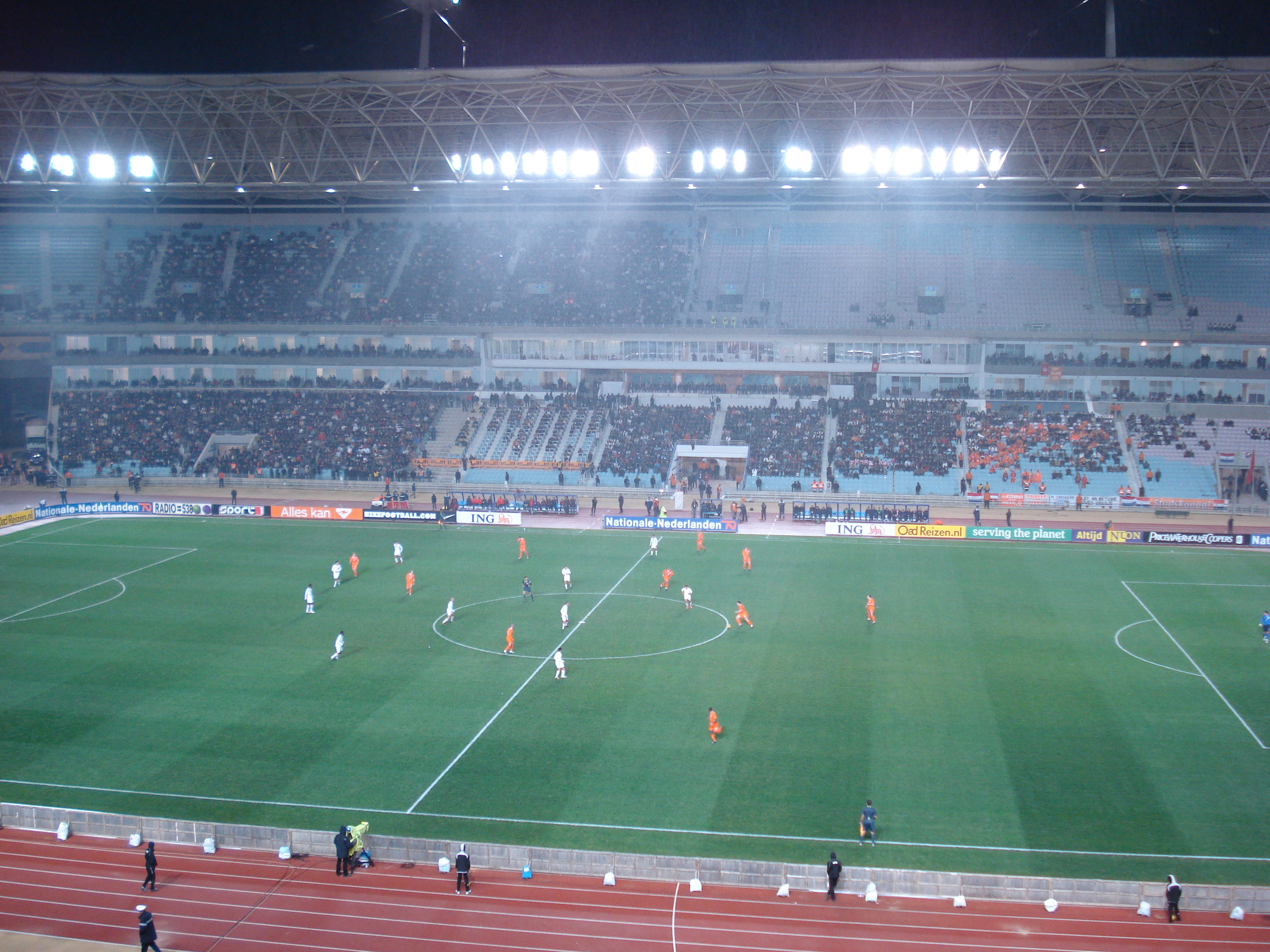
Stade Olympique de Radès in Tunis, Tunisia, hosted the second leg.

== Road to the final ==
Note: In all results below, the score of the finalist is given first (H: home; A: away).

(Morocco) Wydad AC				Round	(Tunisia) Espérance de Tunis			
Opponent	Agg.	1st leg	2nd leg	Qualifying rounds	Opponent	Agg.	1st leg	2nd leg
(Senegal) ASC Diaraf	3–3 (a)	2–0 (H)	1–3 (A)	First round	Bye			
Opponent	Result			Group stage	Opponent	Result		
(Ivory Coast) ASEC Mimosas	5–2 (H)			Matchday 1	(Guinea) Horoya	1–1 (A)		
(South Africa) Mamelodi Sundowns	1–2 (A)			Matchday 2	(Zimbabwe) FC Platinum	2–0 (H)		
(Nigeria) Lobi Stars	1–0 (A)			Matchday 3	(South Africa) Orlando Pirates	0–0 (A)		
(Nigeria) Lobi Stars	0–0 (H)			Matchday 4	(South Africa) Orlando Pirates	2–0 (H)		
(Ivory Coast) ASEC Mimosas	0–2 (A)			Matchday 5	(Guinea) Horoya	2–0 (H)		
(South Africa) Mamelodi Sundowns	1–0 (H)			Matchday 6	(Zimbabwe) FC Platinum	2–1 (A)		
**Group A winners**: Pos / Team / Pld / Pts; **1** / (Morocco) Wydad AC / **6** / **10**; 2 / (South Africa) Mamelodi Sundowns / 6 / **10**; 3 / (Nigeria) Lobi Stars / 6 / **7**; 4 / (Ivory Coast) ASEC Mimosas / 6 / **7**; Source: CAF				Final standings	**Group B winners**: Pos / Team / Pld / Pts; **1** / (Tunisia) Espérance de Tunis / **6** / **14**; 2 / (Guinea) Horoya / 6 / **10**; 3 / (South Africa) Orlando Pirates / 6 / **6**; 4 / (Zimbabwe) FC Platinum / 6 / **2**; Source: CAF			
Opponent	Agg.	1st leg	2nd leg	Knockout stage	Opponent	Agg.	1st leg	2nd leg
(Guinea) Horoya	5–0	0–0 (A)	5–0 (H)	Quarter-finals	(Algeria) CS Constantine	6–3	3–2 (A)	3–1 (H)
(South Africa) Mamelodi Sundowns	2–1	2–1 (H)	0–0 (A)	Semi-finals	(Democratic Republic of the Congo) TP Mazembe	1–0	1–0 (H)	0–0 (A)

== Format ==
The final was played on a home-and-away two-legged basis, with the order of legs determined by the knockout stage draw, which was held on 20 March 2019, 20:00 CAT (UTC+2), at the Marriott Hotel in Cairo, Egypt.

If the aggregate score was tied after the second leg, the away goals rule would have been applied, and if still tied, extra time would not have been played, and a penalty shoot-out would have been used to determine the winner.

== Matches ==
=== First leg ===
24 May 2019
22:00 UTC+0

Wydad AC (Morocco)	1–1	(Tunisia) Espérance de Tunis
Comara 79'	Report	Coulibaly 44'

Prince Moulay Abdellah Stadium, Rabat
Attendance: 50,000
Referee: Gehad Grisha (Egypt)

**Wydad AC**	**Espérance de Tunis**

GK	26	(Morocco) Ahmed Reda Tagnaouti
RB	28	(Morocco) Abdelatif Noussir
CB	3	(Morocco) Achraf Dari	(yellow card) 28'
CB	29	(Ivory Coast) Cheick Comara
LB	22	(Morocco) Ayoub El Amloud		(substituted off) 77'
RM	7	(Morocco) Mohamed Ounajem
CM	4	(Morocco) Salaheddine Saidi
CM	6	(Morocco) Brahim Nekkach (c)	(yellow card) 42' (yellow-red card) 49'
LM	11	(Morocco) Ismail El Haddad
CF	18	(Morocco) Walid El Karti		(substituted off) 63'
CF	9	(Nigeria) Michael Babatunde		(substituted off) 62'
Substitutes:
GK	12	(Morocco) Badreddine Benachour
DF	8	(Morocco) Badr Gaddarine		(substituted on) 77'
MF	21	(Morocco) Zouhair El Moutaraji
MF	24	(Morocco) Yahya Jabrane		(substituted on) 63'
FW	17	(Morocco) Badie Aouk
FW	20	(Morocco) Ayman El Hassouni	(yellow card) 90+4'	(substituted on) 62'
FW	25	(Nigeria) Gabriel Okechukwu
Manager:
(Tunisia) Faouzi Benzarti

GK	1	(Tunisia) Moez Ben Cherifia	(yellow card) 84'
RB	22	(Tunisia) Sameh Derbali	(yellow card) 68'
CB	5	(Tunisia) Chamseddine Dhaouadi	(yellow card) 23'
CB	12	(Tunisia) Khalil Chemmam (c)
LB	20	(Tunisia) Ayman Ben Mohamed
CM	30	(Cameroon) Franck Kom		(substituted off) 87'
CM	15	(Ivory Coast) Fousseny Coulibaly
RW	8	(Tunisia) Anice Badri
AM	25	(Tunisia) Ghailene Chaalali	(yellow card) 26'
LW	10	(Algeria) Youcef Belaïli		(substituted off) 90+5'
CF	29	(Nigeria) Junior Lokosa		(substituted off) 88'
Substitutes:
GK	23	(Tunisia) Ali Jemal
DF	6	(Tunisia) Mohamed Ali Yacoubi
DF	26	(Tunisia) Houcine Rabii
MF	17	(Libya) Hamdou Elhouni		(substituted on) 90+5'
MF	18	(Tunisia) Saad Bguir		(substituted on) 87'
MF	28	(Tunisia) Mohamed Amine Meskini
FW	11	(Tunisia) Taha Yassine Khenissi		(substituted on) 88'
Manager:
(Tunisia) Moïne Chaâbani

Assistant referees:
Waleed Ahmed (Sudan)
Abdelhak Etchiali (Algeria)
Fourth official:
Bernard Camille (Seychelles)

**Match rules**

- 90 minutes.
- Seven named substitutes, of which up to three may be used.

=== Second leg ===
31 May 2019
22:00 UTC+1

Espérance de Tunis (Tunisia)	Abandoned (1–0)	(Morocco) Wydad AC
Belaïli 41'	Report

Stade Olympique de Radès, Tunis
Attendance: 60,000
Referee: Bakary Gassama (Gambia)

**Espérance de Tunis**	**Wydad AC**

GK	19	(Tunisia) Rami Jridi
RB	22	(Tunisia) Sameh Derbali
CB	6	(Tunisia) Mohamed Ali Yacoubi
CB	12	(Tunisia) Khalil Chemmam (c)
LB	20	(Tunisia) Ayman Ben Mohamed
CM	15	(Ivory Coast) Fousseny Coulibaly	(yellow card) 10'
CM	30	(Cameroon) Franck Kom
RW	8	(Tunisia) Anice Badri
AM	18	(Tunisia) Saad Bguir
LW	10	(Algeria) Youcef Belaïli	(yellow card) 42'	(substituted off) 61'
CF	11	(Tunisia) Taha Yassine Khenissi
Substitutes:
GK	23	(Tunisia) Ali Jemal
DF	24	(Tunisia) Iheb Mbarki
DF	26	(Tunisia) Houcine Rabii
MF	17	(Libya) Hamdou Elhouni		(substituted on) 61'
MF	28	(Tunisia) Mohamed Amine Meskini
FW	14	(Tunisia) Haythem Jouini
FW	29	(Nigeria) Junior Lokosa
Manager:
(Tunisia) Moïne Chaâbani

GK	26	(Morocco) Ahmed Reda Tagnaouti
RB	28	(Morocco) Abdelatif Noussir (c)
CB	30	(Morocco) Mohamed Nahiri
CB	29	(Ivory Coast) Cheick Comara
LB	22	(Morocco) Ayoub El Amloud
DM	4	(Morocco) Salaheddine Saidi
RM	11	(Morocco) Ismail El Haddad
CM	18	(Morocco) Walid El Karti
CM	24	(Morocco) Yahya Jabrane
LM	17	(Morocco) Badie Aouk
CF	20	(Morocco) Ayman El Hassouni
Substitutes:
GK	12	(Morocco) Badreddine Benachour
DF	8	(Morocco) Badr Gaddarine
MF	2	(Morocco) Anas El Asbahi
MF	9	(Nigeria) Michael Babatunde
MF	21	(Morocco) Zouhair El Moutaraji
FW	19	(Morocco) Amin Tighazoui
FW	25	(Nigeria) Gabriel Okechukwu
Manager:
(Tunisia) Faouzi Benzarti

Assistant referees:
Djibril Camara (Senegal)
El Hadji Samba (Senegal)
Fourth official:
Joshua Bondo (Botswana)

**Match rules**

- 90 minutes.
- Penalty shoot-out if tied on aggregate and away goals.
- Seven named substitutes, of which up to three may be used.

== See also ==
- 2019 CAF Confederation Cup Final
- 2020 CAF Super Cup
