= 2018–19 JS Saoura season =

JS Saoura
2018–19 season
- Owner: Entreprise Nationale de Forage
- President: Mohamed Zerouati
- Head coach: Nabil Neghiz (until 20 January 2019); Karim Zaoui (from 30 January 2019)
- Stadium: Stade 20 Août 1955
- Ligue 1: 4th
- Algerian Cup: Round of 64
- Champions League: Group stage
- Top goalscorer: League: Mohamed El Amine Hammia (5); All: Mohamed El Amine Hammia (9)

In the 2018–19 season, the Algerian football club JS Saoura competed in Ligue 1 (the top league in Algeria) for the seventh season in a row. The club won 13 out of 30 league games (losing 9 and drawing the remaining 8) and finished 4th out of 16 teams, resulting in qualification for the 2019–20 Arab Club Champions Cup. The club also took part in the Algerian Cup, but were knocked out by IB Lakhdaria in their first match, and the CAF Champions League, where they reached the group stage. The midfielder Adel Bouchiba had the most appearances for the season (at 39), and top goalscorer was Mohamed El Amine Hammia (who scored 9 goals for the club: 5 in Ligue 1 and 4 in the Champions League). The club's head coach at the start of the season was Nabil Neghiz; he was replaced by Karim Zaoui in January 2019.

== Squad list ==
Players and squad numbers last updated on 18 November 2010.
Note: Flags indicate national team as has been defined under FIFA eligibility rules. Players may hold more than one non-FIFA nationality.

No.	Nat.	Position	Name	Date of Birth (Age)	Signed from
Goalkeepers
Defenders
Midfielders
Forwards

== Competitions ==
=== Overview ===
Competition	Record								Started round	Final position / round	First match	Last match
Competition	G	W	D	L	GF	GA	GD	Win %	Started round	Final position / round	First match	Last match
Ligue 1	30	13	8	9	33	22	+11	43.33	—N/a	4th	11 August 2018	26 May 2019
Algerian Cup	1	0	1	0	0	0	+0	0.00	Round of 64		27 December 2018	
Champions League	10	4	3	3	10	10	+0	40.00	Preliminary round	Group stage	27 November 2018	16 March 2019
Total	41	17	12	12	43	32	+11	41.46				

Updated to match played 28 May 2019
Source: Competitions

== League table ==
Pos	Team	Pld	W	D	L	GF	GA	GD	Pts	Qualification or relegation
2	JS Kabylie	30	15	7	8	38	25	+13	52	Qualification for Champions League
3	Paradou AC	30	14	6	10	38	24	+14	48	Qualification for Confederation Cup
4	JS Saoura	30	13	8	9	33	22	+11	47	Qualification for Arab Club Champions Cup
5	ES Sétif	30	13	6	11	34	24	+10	45	
6	MC Alger	30	11	10	9	35	36	−1	43	Qualification for Arab Club Champions Cup

Source: DZFoot
Rules for classification: 1) points; 2) head-to-head points; 3) head-to-head goal difference; 4) goal difference; 5) total goals; 6) fairplay ranking; 7) playoff.

=== Results summary ===
Overall								Home						Away					
Pld	W	D	L	GF	GA	GD	Pts	W	D	L	GF	GA	GD	W	D	L	GF	GA	GD
30	13	8	9	33	22	+11	47	10	3	2	28	10	+18	3	5	7	5	12	−7

Last updated: 28 May 2019.
Source: Competitive matches

=== Results by round ===
Round	1	2	3	4	5	6	7	8	9	10	11	12	13	14	15	16	17	18	19	20	21	22	23	24	25	26	27	28	29	30
Ground	A	H	A	H	A	H	A	A	H	A	H	A	H	A	H	H	A	H	A	H	A	H	H	A	H	A	H	A	H	A
Result	D	W	L	W	L	L	L	W	W	D	D	D	W	W	D	L	D	W	L	W	L	W	D	L	W	L	W	D	W	W
Position	9	4	8	4	9	10	12	8	5	6	6	7	6	4	4	5	6	4	6	6	6	5	6	7	5	6	4	5	4	4

Updated to match(es) played on 28 May 2019. Source: Competitive matches
A = Away; H = Home; W = Win; D = Draw; L = Loss

=== Matches ===
Win Draw Loss

11 August 2018 Round 1	JS Kabylie	0–0	JS Saoura	Tizi Ouzou
19:00		Soccerway report		Stadium: November 1, 1954 Stadium; Attendance: 0 (close doors); Referee: Mohamed Saïdi

17 August 2018 Round 2	JS Saoura	2–0	MC Oran	Béchar
20:00	Boulaouidet 57' (pen.), 85'	Soccerway report		Stadium: Stade 20 Août 1955; Referee: Farouk Mial

28 August 2018 Round 3	CS Constantine	1–0	JS Saoura	Constantine
19:00	Belkacemi 9'	Soccerway report		Stadium: Stade Mohamed Hamlaoui; Referee: Mustapha Bessiri

1 September 2018 Round 4	JS Saoura	3–0	USM Alger	Béchar
20:00	Zaidi 25', 45+2'; Konaté 45'	Soccerway report		Stadium: Stade 20 Août 1955; Referee: Ahmed Bouzrar

10 September 2018 Round 5	NA Hussein Dey	1–0	JS Saoura	Belouizdad
17:00	Gasmi 13'	Soccerway report		Stadium: Stade 20 Août 1955; Referee: Rafik Achouri

15 September 2018 Round 6	JS Saoura	0–1	CA Bordj Bou Arreridj	Béchar
20:00		Soccerway report	El Moudene 90+4'	Stadium: Stade 20 Août 1955; Referee: Merzoug Brahimi

22 September 2018 Round 7	DRB Tadjenanet	1–0	JS Saoura	Tadjenanet
16:00	Aribi 54' (pen.)	Soccerway report		Stadium: Lahoua Smaïl Stadium; Referee: Lotfi Bekouassa

29 September 2018 Round 8	MO Béjaïa	0–1	JS Saoura	Béjaïa
17:45		Soccerway report	Djallit 48'	Stadium: Stade de l'Unité Maghrébine; Referee: Mohamed Saïdi

5 October 2018 Round 9	JS Saoura	3–0	USM Bel Abbès	Béchar
19:00	Farhi 5'; Djallit 50' (pen.); Bekakchi 90+3'	Soccerway report		Stadium: Stade 20 Août 1955; Referee: Lahlou Benbraham

9 October 2018 Round 10	AS Ain M'lila	0–0	JS Saoura	Batna
15:00		Soccerway report		Stadium: November 1, 1954 Stadium; Referee: Amine Sekhraoui

19 October 2018 Round 11	JS Saoura	2–2	Paradou AC	Béchar
19:00	Boulaouidet 44'; Djallit 86'	Soccerway report	Bouabta 55'; Zorgane 82'	Stadium: Stade 20 Août 1955; Referee: Abderrezzak Arab

30 October 2018 Round 12	MC Alger	0–0	JS Saoura	Algiers
18:00		Soccerway report		Stadium: July 5, 1962 Stadium; Referee: Mustapha Ghorbal

6 November 2018 Round 13	JS Saoura	2–0	CR Belouizdad	Béchar
18:00	Hammia 9', 57' (pen.)	Soccerway report		Stadium: Stade 20 Août 1955; Referee: Farouk Mial

10 November 2018 Round 14	ES Sétif	0–1	JS Saoura	Sétif
17:00		Soccerway report	Hammia 32'	Stadium: Stade 8 Mai 1945; Referee: Ahmed Bouzrar

21 November 2018 Round 15	JS Saoura	0–0	Olympique de Médéa	Béchar
18:00		Soccerway report		Stadium: Stade 20 Août 1955; Referee: Abderrezzak Arab

4 January 2019 Round 16	JS Saoura	0–1	JS Kabylie	Béchar
18:00		Soccerway report	Fiston 52'	Stadium: Stade 20 Août 1955; Referee: Mohamed Saïdi

22 January 2019 Round 17	MC Oran	1–1	JS Saoura	Oran
17:45	Toumi 40'	Soccerway report	Yahia-Chérif 21'	Stadium: Ahmed Zabana Stadium; Referee: Lahlou Benbraham

26 January 2019 Round 19	USM Alger	2–0	JS Saoura	Bologhine
16:00	Chafaï 32'; Zouari 42'	Soccerway report Live TV: None		Stadium: Omar Hamadi Stadium; Attendance: 0 (close doors); Referee: Mustapha Ghorbal

7 February 2019 Round 20	JS Saoura	1–0	NA Hussein Dey	Béchar
18:00	Yahia-Chérif 71'	Soccerway report		Stadium: Stade 20 Août 1955; Referee: Farouk Mial

13 February 2019 Round 22	JS Saoura	2–0	DRB Tadjenanet	Béchar
18:00	Ulimwengu 82'; Boukbouka 90+2'	Soccerway report		Stadium: Stade 20 Août 1955; Referee: Amine Sekhraoui

22 February 2019 Round 21	CA Bordj Bou Arreridj	2–0	JS Saoura	Bordj Bou Arréridj
18:00	Djahnit 35', 36'	Soccerway report		Stadium: Stade 20 Août 1955; Referee: Ali Nader

1 April 2019 Round 25	JS Saoura	4–1	AS Ain M'lila	Béchar
19:00	Talah 4'; Boubekeur 17'; Hammar 59'; Yahia-Chérif 78'	Soccerway report	Tiaiba 64'	Stadium: Stade 20 Août 1955; Referee: Said Aouina

21 April 2019 Round 26	Paradou AC	2–0	JS Saoura	Bologhine
16:00	Naidji 44'; Bouzok 76'	Soccerway report		Stadium: Omar Hamadi Stadium; Referee: Mustapha Ghorbal

2 March 2019 Round 23	JS Saoura	0–0	MO Béjaïa	Béchar
18:00		Soccerway report		Stadium: Stade 20 Août 1955; Referee: Mohamed Saïdi

27 April 2019 Round 18	JS Saoura	3–1	CS Constantine	Béchar
18:00	Farhi 66', 85'; Hammar 89'	Soccerway report	Bahamboula 62'	Stadium: Stade 20 Août 1955; Referee: Ahmed Bouzrar

4 May 2019 Round 24	USM Bel Abbès	1–0	JS Saoura	Sidi Bel Abbès
16:00	Khali 10'	Soccerway report		Stadium: Stade 24 Fevrier 1956; Referee: Hamza Bouslimani

11 May 2019 Round 27	JS Saoura	4–3	MC Alger	Béchar
22:30	Bekakchi 22'; Hammia 36' (pen.); Lahmeri 50'; Saâd 67'	Soccerway report	Bendebka 31'; Frioui 45+1' (pen.); Nekkache 82'	Stadium: Stade 20 Août 1955; Referee: Farouk Mial

16 May 2019 Round 28	CR Belouizdad	1–1	JS Saoura	Belouizdad
22:30	Rabti 3'	Soccerway report	Hammia 8'	Stadium: Stade 20 Août 1955; Referee: Mehdi Abid Charef

21 May 2019 Round 29	JS Saoura	2–1	ES Sétif	Béchar
22:30	Zaidi 15'; Hammia 45+2'	Soccerway report	Bakir 45+1' (pen.)	Stadium: Stade 20 Août 1955; Referee: Lyés Bekouassa

26 May 2019 Round 30	Olympique de Médéa	0–1	JS Saoura	Médéa
16:00		Soccerway report	Zaidi 55'	Stadium: Stade Imam Lyes de Médéa; Referee: Ahmed Bouzrar

== Algerian Cup ==
27 December 2018 Round of 64	IB Lakhdaria	0–0 (a.e.t.) (4–3 p)	JS Saoura
14:00				Referee: Lahlou Benbraham

== Champions League ==
=== Preliminary round ===
27 November 2018 First leg	JS Saoura (Algeria)	2–0	(Ivory Coast) SC Gagnoa	Béchar
17:45 UTC+1	Hammia 9' (pen.); Boulaouidet 51' (pen.)	Report		Stadium: Stade 20 Août 1955; Referee: Haithem Kossaï (Tunisia)

5 December 2018 Second leg	SC Gagnoa (Ivory Coast)	0–0	(Algeria) JS Saoura	Abidjan
16:00 UTC+0		Report		Stadium: Stade Robert Champroux; Referee: Boureima Sanogo (Burkina Faso)

=== First round ===
15 December 2018 First leg	JS Saoura (Algeria)	2–0	(Morocco) Ittihad Tanger	Béchar
17:45 UTC+1	Hammia 68' (pen.); Konaté 79'	Report		Stadium: Stade 20 Août 1955; Referee: Boubou Traoré (Mali)

23 December 2018 Second leg	Ittihad Tanger (Morocco)	1–0	(Algeria) JS Saoura	Tangier
16:00 UTC+1	El Ouadi 48'	Report		Stadium: Stade Ibn Batouta; Referee: Sékou Ahmed Touré (Guinea)

=== Group stage ===
==== Group D ====
Pos	Team	Pld	W	D	L	GF	GA	GD	Pts	Qualification	AHL	SIM	JSS	VIT
1	(Egypt) Al-Ahly	6	3	1	2	11	3	+8	10	Quarter-finals	—	5–0	3–0	2–0
2	(Tanzania) Simba	6	3	0	3	6	13	−7	9	Quarter-finals	1–0	—	3–0	2–1
3	(Algeria) JS Saoura	6	2	2	2	6	9	−3	8		1–1	2–0	—	1–0
4	(Democratic Republic of the Congo) AS Vita Club	6	2	1	3	9	7	+2	7		1–0	5–0	2–2	—

Source: CAF

12 January 2019 1	Simba (Tanzania)	3–0	(Algeria) JS Saoura	Dar es Salaam
16:00 UTC+3	Okwi 45+3'; Kagere 52', 67'	Report		Stadium: National Stadium; Referee: Joshua Bondo (Botswana)

18 January 2019 2	JS Saoura (Algeria)	1–1	(Egypt) Al-Ahly	Béchar
20:00 UTC+1	Yahia-Chérif 59'	Report	Nedvěd 85'	Stadium: Stade 20 Août 1955; Referee: Eric Otogo-Castane (Gabon)

2 February 2019 3	AS Vita Club (Democratic Republic of the Congo)	2–2	(Algeria) JS Saoura	Kinshasa
17:00 UTC+1	Kasengu 14'; Mundele 37'	Report	Hammia 45' (pen.); Yahia-Chérif 88'	Stadium: Stade des Martyrs; Referee: Hélder Martins de Carvalho (Angola)

12 February 2019 4	JS Saoura (Algeria)	1–0	(Democratic Republic of the Congo) AS Vita Club	Béchar
20:00 UTC+1	Hammar 78'	Report		Stadium: Stade 20 Août 1955; Referee: Louis Hakizimana (Rwanda)

9 March 2019 5	JS Saoura (Algeria)	2–0	(Tanzania) Simba	Béchar
20:00 UTC+1	Yahia-Chérif 18'; Hammia 51' (pen.)	Report		Stadium: Stade 20 Août 1955; Referee: Jean-Jacques Ndala Ngambo (DR Congo)

16 March 2019 6	Al-Ahly (Egypt)	3–0	(Algeria) JS Saoura	Alexandria
18:00 UTC+2	Talah 30' (o.g.); M. Mohsen 45+2'; El Shahat 81'	Report		Stadium: Borg El Arab Stadium; Referee: Sadok Selmi (Tunisia)

== Squad information ==
=== Playing statistics ===
No.	Pos	Nat	Player	Total		Ligue 1		Algerian Cup		Champions League	
No.	Pos	Nat	Player	Apps	Goals	Apps	Goals	Apps	Goals	Apps	Goals
Goalkeepers
1	GK	(Algeria) ALG	Abderaouf Natèche	32	0	24	0	0	0	8	0
30	GK	(Algeria) ALG	Khaled Boukacem	11	0	8	0	1	0	2	0
Defenders
2	DF	(Algeria) ALG	Mohamed El Amine Barka	12	0	8	0	0	0	4	0
4	DF	(Algeria) ALG	Ibrahim Bekakchi	34	2	24	2	0	0	10	0
15	DF	(Algeria) ALG	Fateh Talah	30	1	22	1	0	0	8	0
20	DF	(Algeria) ALG	Nacereddine Khoualed	25	1	16	1	0	0	9	0
22	DF	(Algeria) ALG	Imadeddine Boubekeur	18	1	14	1	1	0	3	0
24	DF	(Algeria) ALG	Mohamed Tiboutine	27	0	21	0	1	0	5	0
29	DF	(Senegal) SEN	El Hadji Youssoupha Konaté	25	2	19	1	1	0	5	1
Midfielders
6	MF	(Algeria) ALG	Younes Koulkheir	9	0	6	0	0	0	3	0
7	MF	(Algeria) ALG	Abdeldjalil Taki Eddine Saâd	11	1	10	1	1	0	0	0
26	MF	(Algeria) ALG	Mohamed El Amine Hammia	35	9	25	5	0	0	10	4
27	MF	(Algeria) ALG	Ibrahim Farhi	26	3	24	3	1	0	1	0
25	MF	(Algeria) ALG	Adel Bouchiba	39	0	30	0	0	0	9	0
18	MF	(Algeria) ALG	Messala Merbah	30	0	21	0	0	0	9	0
9	MF	(Algeria) ALG	Ziri Hammar	16	3	9	2	1	0	6	1
	MF	(Algeria) ALG	Ilias Medafai	2	0	2	0	0	0	0	0
Forwards
8	FW	(Algeria) ALG	Sid Ali Yahia-Chérif	29	5	20	2	1	0	8	3
11	FW	(Algeria) ALG	Mohamed Boulaouidet	19	4	12	3	1	0	6	1
17	FW	(Algeria) ALG	Moustapha Djallit	17	3	12	3	1	0	4	0
19	FW	(Algeria) ALG	Hamza Zaidi	34	4	26	4	0	0	8	0
28	FW	(Algeria) ALG	Aimen Lahmeri	20	1	16	1	1	0	3	0
23	FW	(Tanzania) TAN	Thomas Ulimwengu	13	1	8	1	0	0	5	0
14	FW	(Algeria) ALG	Rafik Boukbouka	9	1	8	1	0	0	1	0
	FW	(Algeria) ALG	Mohamed Lamine Boutouala	1	0	1	0	0	0	0	0
	FW	(Algeria) ALG	Abderrazak Khelifi	2	0	2	0	0	0	0	0
Players transferred out during the season
13	MF	(Algeria) ALG	Nabil Bousmaha	9	0	6	0	1	0	2	0
14	MF	(Mali) MLI	Saïdouba Bissiri Camara	8	0	8	0	0	0	0	0
10	MF	(Algeria) ALG	Sid Ahmed Aouedj	12	0	8	0	1	0	3	0
21	DF	(Algeria) ALG	Ahmida Zenasni	6	0	5	0	1	0	0	0

Last updated: 9 June 2019
Source: fr.soccerway.com

== Squad list ==
As of August 11, 2018. Note: Flags indicate national team as defined under FIFA eligibility rules; some limited exceptions apply. Players may hold more than one non-FIFA nationality.

No.	Pos.	Nation	Player
1	GK	ALG	Abderaouf Natèche
2	DF	ALG	Mohamed El Amine Barka
4	DF	ALG	Ibrahim Bekakchi
6	MF	ALG	Younes Koulkheir
7	MF	ALG	Abdeldjalil Taki Eddine Saâd
8	FW	ALG	Sid Ali Yahia-Chérif
10	MF	ALG	Sid Ahmed Aouedj
11	FW	ALG	Mohamed Boulaouidet
13	MF	ALG	Nabil Bousmaha
14	MF	GUI	Saïdouba Bissiri Camara
15	DF	ALG	Fateh Talah
16	GK	ALG	Mohamed Zakaria Haouli
17	FW	ALG	Moustapha Djallit (captain)

No.	Pos.	Nation	Player
18	DF	ALG	Messala Merbah
19	FW	ALG	Hamza Zaidi
20	DF	ALG	Nacereddine Khoualed
21	DF	ALG	Ahmida Zenasni
22	MF	ALG	Imadeddine Boubekeur
24	DF	ALG	Mohamed Tiboutine
25	DF	ALG	Adel Bouchiba
26	MF	ALG	Mohamed El Amine Hammia
27	MF	ALG	Ibrahim Farhi Benhalima
28	FW	ALG	Aimen Lahmeri
29	DF	SEN	El Hadji Youssoupha Konaté
30	GK	ALG	Khaled Boukacem

== Transfers ==
=== In ===
Date	Pos	Player	From club	Transfer fee	Source
25 May 2018	GK	(Algeria) Abderaouf Natèche	MC Oran	Free transfer	
9 June 2018	MF	(Algeria) Sid Ahmed Aouedj	ES Sétif	Free transfer	
9 June 2018	MF	(Algeria) Adel Bouchiba	Olympique de Médéa	Free transfer	
13 June 2018	FW	(Algeria) Mohamed Boulaouidet	(Saudi Arabia) Ohod Club	Free transfer	
5 July 2018	MF	(Algeria) Younes Koulkheir	Olympique de Médéa	Free transfer	
19 July 2018	MF	(Guinea) Seydouba Bissiri Camara	(Guinea) AS Kaloum Star	Free transfer	
25 December 2018	FW	(Tanzania) Thomas Ulimwengu	(Sudan) Al-Hilal Club	Free transfer	

=== Out ===
Date	Pos	Player	To club	Transfer fee	Source
13 June 2018	MF	(Algeria) Abderrahmane Bourdim	MC Alger	Undisclosed	
