= 2018–19 CAF Champions League group stage =

- Dates: 11 January – 16 March 2019

Tournament statistics
- Matches played: 47
- Goals scored: 110 (2.34 per match)

The 2018–19 CAF Champions League group stage were played from 11 January to 16 March 2019. A total of 16 teams competed in the group stage to decide the eight places in the knockout stage of the 2018–19 CAF Champions League.

== Draw ==
The draw for the group stage was held on 28 December 2018, 19:00 CAT (UTC+2), at the Nile Ritz-Carlton in Cairo, Egypt. The 16 teams, including the title holders, Espérance de Tunis, and the 15 winners of the first round of qualifying, were drawn into four groups of four.

The teams were seeded by their performances in the CAF competitions for the previous five seasons (CAF 5-year ranking points shown in parentheses). Each group contained one team from each of Pot 1, Pot 2, Pot 3, and Pot 4, and each team was drawn into one of the positions in their group.

Pot	Pot 1	Pot 2	Pot 3	Pot 4
Teams	(Democratic Republic of the Congo) TP Mazembe (66 pts); (Egypt) Al-Ahly (62 pts); (Morocco) Wydad AC (51 pts); (Tunisia) Espérance de Tunis (45 pts)	(South Africa) Mamelodi Sundowns (40 pts); (Democratic Republic of the Congo) AS Vita Club (29 pts); (Guinea) Horoya (19 pts); (Tunisia) Club Africain (12 pts)	(Ivory Coast) ASEC Mimosas (8.5 pts); (South Africa) Orlando Pirates (8 pts); (Tanzania) Simba; (Algeria) CS Constantine	(Egypt) Ismaily; (Nigeria) Lobi Stars; (Zimbabwe) FC Platinum; (Algeria) JS Saoura

== Format ==
In the group stage, each group was played on a home-and-away round-robin basis. The winners and runners-up of each group advanced to the quarter-finals of the knockout stage.

=== Tiebreakers ===
The teams were ranked according to points (3 points for a win, 1 point for a draw, 0 points for a loss). If tied on points, tiebreakers were applied in the following order (Regulations III. 20 & 21):

1. Points in head-to-head matches among tied teams;
2. Goal difference in head-to-head matches among tied teams;
3. Goals scored in head-to-head matches among tied teams;
4. Away goals scored in head-to-head matches among tied teams;
5. If more than two teams are tied, and after applying all head-to-head criteria above, a subset of teams are still tied, all head-to-head criteria above are reapplied exclusively to this subset of teams;
6. Goal difference in all group matches;
7. Goals scored in all group matches;
8. Away goals scored in all group matches;
9. Drawing of lots.

== Schedule ==
The schedule of each matchday was as follows (matches scheduled in midweek in italics). Effective from the Champions League group stage, weekend matches were played on Fridays and Saturdays while midweek matches were played on Tuesdays, with some exceptions. Kick-off times were also fixed at 13:00 (Saturdays and Tuesdays only), 16:00 and 19:00 GMT.

Matchday	Dates	Matches
Matchday 1	11–12 January 2019	Team 1 vs. Team 4, Team 2 vs. Team 3
Matchday 2	18–19 January 2019	Team 3 vs. Team 1, Team 4 vs. Team 2
Matchday 3	1–2 February 2019	Team 4 vs. Team 3, Team 1 vs. Team 2
Matchday 4	12 February 2019	Team 3 vs. Team 4, Team 2 vs. Team 1
Matchday 5	8–9 March 2019	Team 4 vs. Team 1, Team 3 vs. Team 2
Matchday 6	15–16 March 2019	Team 1 vs. Team 3, Team 2 vs. Team 4

== Groups ==
=== Group A ===
Pos	Team	Pld	W	D	L	GF	GA	GD	Pts	Qualification	WAC	MSD	LOB	ASE
1	(Morocco) Wydad AC	6	3	1	2	8	6	+2	10 (Note: Head-to-head away goals scored: Wydad AC 1, Mamelodi Sundowns 0.)	Quarter-finals	—	1–0	0–0	5–2
2	(South Africa) Mamelodi Sundowns	6	3	1	2	9	5	+4	10	Quarter-finals	2–1	—	3–0	3–1
3	(Nigeria) Lobi Stars	6	2	1	3	4	6	−2	7 (Note: Head-to-head goal difference: Lobi Stars +1, ASEC Mimosas –1.)		0–1	2–1	—	2–0
4	(Ivory Coast) ASEC Mimosas	6	2	1	3	6	10	−4	7		2–0	0–0	1–0	—

Source: CAF
Rules for classification: Group stage tiebreakers
Notes:
11 January 2019
17:00 UTC+1

Lobi Stars (Nigeria)	2–1	(South Africa) Mamelodi Sundowns
Koné 45' (pen.); Mathias 52'	Report	Laffor 38'

Nnamdi Azikiwe Stadium, Enugu
Referee: Gehad Grisha (Egypt)
11 January 2019
20:00 UTC+1

Wydad AC (Morocco)	5–2	(Ivory Coast) ASEC Mimosas
El Haddad 16'; Babatunde 48'; El Moutaraji 56'; El Karti 69'; Aouk 80'	Report	Coulibaly 44'; Bagaté 85'

Prince Moulay Abdellah Stadium, Rabat
Referee: Maguette N'Diaye (Senegal)

19 January 2019
16:00 UTC+0

ASEC Mimosas (Ivory Coast)	1–0	(Nigeria) Lobi Stars
Diomandé 38' (pen.)	Report

Stade Félix Houphouët-Boigny, Abidjan
Referee: Mustapha Ghorbal (Algeria)
19 January 2019
21:00 UTC+2

Mamelodi Sundowns (South Africa)	2–1	(Morocco) Wydad AC
Zwane 8', 64'	Report	Nahiri 35'

Lucas Masterpieces Moripe Stadium, Pretoria
Referee: Hélder Martins de Carvalho (Angola)

1 February 2019
21:00 UTC+2

Mamelodi Sundowns (South Africa)	3–1	(Ivory Coast) ASEC Mimosas
Lebusa 10'; Zwane 56'; Tade 90+2'	Report	Diomandé 15' (pen.)

Loftus Versfeld Stadium, Pretoria
Referee: Sadok Selmi (Tunisia)
2 February 2019
14:00 UTC+1

Lobi Stars (Nigeria)	0–1	(Morocco) Wydad AC
	Report	Nahiri 20' (pen.)

Nnamdi Azikiwe Stadium, Enugu
Referee: Jean-Jacques Ndala Ngambo (DR Congo)

12 February 2019
16:00 UTC+0

ASEC Mimosas (Ivory Coast)	0–0	(South Africa) Mamelodi Sundowns
	Report

Stade Félix Houphouët-Boigny, Abidjan
Referee: Youssef Essrayri (Tunisia)
12 February 2019
20:00 UTC+1

Wydad AC (Morocco)	0–0	(Nigeria) Lobi Stars
	Report

Prince Moulay Abdellah Stadium, Rabat
Referee: Eric Otogo-Castane (Gabon)

9 March 2019
16:00 UTC+0

ASEC Mimosas (Ivory Coast)	2–0	(Morocco) Wydad AC
Touré 68', 89'	Report

Stade Félix Houphouët-Boigny, Abidjan
Referee: Louis Hakizimana (Rwanda)
9 March 2019
21:00 UTC+2

Mamelodi Sundowns (South Africa)	3–0	(Nigeria) Lobi Stars
Morena 2'; Zwane 38'; Maboe 39'	Report

Loftus Versfeld Stadium, Pretoria
Referee: Janny Sikazwe (Zambia)

16 March 2019
17:00 UTC+1

Lobi Stars (Nigeria)	2–0	(Ivory Coast) ASEC Mimosas
Sikiru 2', 39'	Report

Nnamdi Azikiwe Stadium, Enugu
Referee: Haythem Guirat (Tunisia)
16 March 2019
17:00 UTC+1

Wydad AC (Morocco)	1–0	(South Africa) Mamelodi Sundowns
Nahiri 63'	Report

Prince Moulay Abdellah Stadium, Rabat
Referee: Pacifique Ndabihawenimana (Burundi)

=== Group B ===
Pos	Team	Pld	W	D	L	GF	GA	GD	Pts	Qualification	EST	HOR	ORL	PLA
1	(Tunisia) Espérance de Tunis	6	4	2	0	9	2	+7	14	Quarter-finals	—	2–0	2–0	2–0
2	(Guinea) Horoya	6	3	1	2	6	7	−1	10	Quarter-finals	1–1	—	2–1	2–0
3	(South Africa) Orlando Pirates	6	1	3	2	6	6	0	6		0–0	3–0	—	2–2
4	(Zimbabwe) FC Platinum	6	0	2	4	3	9	−6	2		1–2	0–1	0–0	—

Source: CAF
Rules for classification: Group stage tiebreakers
11 January 2019
16:00 UTC+0

Horoya (Guinea)	1–1	(Tunisia) Espérance de Tunis
Mandela 67'	Report	Badri 90+3'

Stade du 28 Septembre, Conakry
Referee: El Fadil Mohamed (Sudan)
12 January 2019
15:00 UTC+2

FC Platinum (Zimbabwe)	0–0	(South Africa) Orlando Pirates
	Report

Barbourfields Stadium, Bulawayo
Referee: Jean Claude Ishimwe (Rwanda)

18 January 2019
14:00 UTC+1

Espérance de Tunis (Tunisia)	2–0	(Zimbabwe) FC Platinum
Khenissi 24', 65'	Report

Stade El Menzah, Tunis
Attendance: 0 (Note: The Espérance de Tunis v FC Platinum and Espérance de Tunis v Orlando Pirates matches were played behind closed doors due to crowd trouble during the Espérance de Tunis v Al-Ahly match (second leg of the 2018 CAF Champions League Final).)
Referee: Bakary Gassama (Gambia)
18 January 2019
18:00 UTC+2

Orlando Pirates (South Africa)	3–0	(Guinea) Horoya
Lorch 45+2'; Shonga 73', 76'	Report

Orlando Stadium, Johannesburg
Referee: Jean-Jacques Ndala Ngambo (DR Congo)

2 February 2019
15:00 UTC+2

FC Platinum (Zimbabwe)	0–1	(Guinea) Horoya
	Report	Assoko 51' (pen.)

Barbourfields Stadium, Bulawayo
Referee: Mustapha Ghorbal Algeria)
2 February 2019
21:00 UTC+2

Orlando Pirates (South Africa)	0–0	(Tunisia) Espérance de Tunis
	Report

Orlando Stadium, Johannesburg
Referee: Bamlak Tessema Weyesa (Ethiopia)

12 February 2019
14:00 UTC+1

Espérance de Tunis (Tunisia)	2–0	(South Africa) Orlando Pirates
Badri 16'; Jouini 89'	Report

Stade El Menzah, Tunis
Attendance: 0
Referee: Thierry Nkurunziza (Burundi)
12 February 2019
16:00 UTC+0

Horoya (Guinea)	2–0	(Zimbabwe) FC Platinum
Mandela 58'; Yakubu 78'	Report

Stade du 28 Septembre, Conakry
Referee: Bernard Camille (Seychelles)

8 March 2019
21:00 UTC+2

Orlando Pirates (South Africa)	2–2	(Zimbabwe) FC Platinum
Lorch 81'; Mulenga 87'	Report	Tigere 27'; Pavari 37'

Orlando Stadium, Johannesburg
Referee: Eric Otogo-Castane (Gabon)
8 March 2019
20:00 UTC+1

Espérance de Tunis (Tunisia)	2–0	(Guinea) Horoya
Assoko 23' (o.g.); Kom 83'	Report

Stade Olympique de Radès, Tunis
Referee: Hélder Martins de Carvalho (Angola)

16 March 2019
15:00 UTC+2

FC Platinum (Zimbabwe)	1–2	(Tunisia) Espérance de Tunis
Sadiki 62'	Report	Meskini 8'; Rjaïbi 83'

Barbourfields Stadium, Bulawayo
Referee: Joshua Bondo (Botswana)
16 March 2019
16:00 UTC+0

Horoya (Guinea)	2–1	(South Africa) Orlando Pirates
Ab. Camara 56'; Haba 72'	Report	Shonga 90+2'

Stade du 28 Septembre, Conakry
Referee: Bamlak Tessema Weyesa (Ethiopia)

=== Group C ===
Pos	Team	Pld	W	D	L	GF	GA	GD	Pts	Qualification	TPM	CSC	CA	ISM
1	(Democratic Republic of the Congo) TP Mazembe	6	3	2	1	13	4	+9	11	Quarter-finals	—	2–0	8–0	2–0
2	(Algeria) CS Constantine	6	3	1	2	8	6	+2	10 (Note: Goal difference in all group matches: CS Constantine +2, Club Africain –4.)	Quarter-finals	3–0	—	0–1	3–2
3	(Tunisia) Club Africain	6	3	1	2	5	9	−4	10		0–0	0–1	—	1–0
4	(Egypt) Ismaily (Note: The CAF announced on 23 January 2019 that Ismaily were disqualified for aggressive fans behaviors, including consistently throwing rocks and water bottles on the assistant referee and the away fans, and other incidents at their home match against Club Africain on 18 January 2019. All results of matches played by Ismaily were annulled and not taken into consideration according to the regulations. However, following an appeal by Ismaily, the CAF decided on 10 February 2019 to reinstate Ismaily to the competition.)	6	0	2	4	4	11	−7	2		1–1	1–1	0–3 (awd.) (Note: On 19 February 2019, following the suspension of the match involving Ismaily and Club Africain due to the aggressive behaviors Ismaily fans shown during the match, CAF decided to consider the match forfeited by Ismaily with a result of 3–0 in favour of Club Africain. The match was originally suspended on the 83rd minute with the score 1–2 for Club Africain.)	—

Source: CAF
Rules for classification: Group stage tiebreakers
Notes:
11 January 2019
20:00 UTC+1

Club Africain (Tunisia)	0–1	(Algeria) CS Constantine
	Report	Belkheir 89'

Stade Olympique de Sousse, Sousse
Attendance: 17,000
Referee: Eric Otogo-Castane (Gabon)
12 January 2019
15:00 UTC+2

TP Mazembe (Democratic Republic of the Congo)	2–0	(Egypt) Ismaily
Ushindi 83'; Mondeko 86'	Report

Stade TP Mazembe, Lubumbashi
Referee: Rédouane Jiyed (Morocco)

18 January 2019
18:00 UTC+2

Ismaily (Egypt)	0–3 Awarded	(Tunisia) Club Africain
Shilongo 8'	Report	Ayadi 40' (pen.), 45' (pen.)

Ismailia Stadium, Ismailia
Attendance: 13,000
Referee: Sidi Alioum (Cameroon)
19 January 2019
20:00 UTC+1

CS Constantine (Algeria)	3–0	(Democratic Republic of the Congo) TP Mazembe
Benayada 51'; Zaâlani 65'; Lamri 80'	Report

Mohamed Hamlaoui Stadium, Constantine
Referee: Noureddine El Jaafari (Morocco)

2 February 2019
15:00 UTC+2

TP Mazembe (Democratic Republic of the Congo)	8–0	(Tunisia) Club Africain
Mondeko 11', 39'; Mika 23'; Muleka 37', 61'; Mputu 76', 83'; Elia 80'	Report

Stade TP Mazembe, Lubumbashi
Referee: Victor Gomes (South Africa)

12 February 2019
17:00 UTC+1

Club Africain (Tunisia)	0–0	(Democratic Republic of the Congo) TP Mazembe
	Report

Stade Olympique de Radès, Tunis
Attendance: 25,000
Referee: Joshua Bondo (Botswana)

23 February 2019 (Note: The Ismaily v CS Constantine on Matchday 3, originally scheduled on 1 February 2019, 18:00 local time, was re-scheduled to 23 February 2019, 18:00 local time, after the reinstatement of Ismaily.)
18:00 UTC+2

Ismaily (Egypt)	1–1	(Algeria) CS Constantine
Shilongo 69'	Report	Hamdy 90+4' (o.g.)

Borg El Arab Stadium, Alexandria
Attendance: 0 (Note: The Ismaily v CS Constantine and Ismaily v TP Mazembe matches were played behind closed doors due to crowd trouble during the Ismaily v Club Africain match.)
Referee: Bakary Gassama (Gambia)

2 March 2019 (Note: The CS Constantine v Ismaily on Matchday 4, originally scheduled on 12 February 2019, 17:00 local time, was re-scheduled to 2 March 2019, 17:00 local time, after the reinstatement of Ismaily.)
17:00 UTC+1

CS Constantine (Algeria)	3–2	(Egypt) Ismaily
Zaâlani 45+2'; Yettou 67'; Bahamboula 81'	Report	Hamdy 13'; Shilongo 50'

Mohamed Hamlaoui Stadium, Constantine
Referee: El Fadil Mohamed (Sudan)

8 March 2019
18:00 UTC+2

Ismaily (Egypt)	1–1	(Democratic Republic of the Congo) TP Mazembe
A. Magdy 55'	Report	Elia 40'

Borg El Arab Stadium, Alexandria
Attendance: 0
Referee: Maguette N'Diaye (Senegal)
8 March 2019
17:00 UTC+1

CS Constantine (Algeria)	0–1	(Tunisia) Club Africain
	Report	Compaoré 45'

Mohamed Hamlaoui Stadium, Constantine
Referee: Rédouane Jiyed (Morocco)

16 March 2019
15:00 UTC+2

TP Mazembe (Democratic Republic of the Congo)	2–0	(Algeria) CS Constantine
Muleka 14' (pen.); Mputu 67'	Report

Stade TP Mazembe, Lubumbashi
Referee: Sidi Alioum (Cameroon)
16 March 2019
14:00 UTC+1

Club Africain (Tunisia)	1–0	(Egypt) Ismaily
Ayadi 75' (pen.)	Report

Stade Olympique de Radès, Tunis
Attendance: 35,000
Referee: El Fadil Mohamed (Sudan)

=== Group D ===
Pos	Team	Pld	W	D	L	GF	GA	GD	Pts	Qualification	AHL	SIM	JSS	VIT
1	(Egypt) Al-Ahly	6	3	1	2	11	3	+8	10	Quarter-finals	—	5–0	3–0	2–0
2	(Tanzania) Simba	6	3	0	3	6	13	−7	9	Quarter-finals	1–0	—	3–0	2–1
3	(Algeria) JS Saoura	6	2	2	2	6	9	−3	8		1–1	2–0	—	1–0
4	(Democratic Republic of the Congo) AS Vita Club	6	2	1	3	9	7	+2	7		1–0	5–0	2–2	—

Source: CAF
Rules for classification: Group stage tiebreakers
12 January 2019
16:00 UTC+3

Simba (Tanzania)	3–0	(Algeria) JS Saoura
Okwi 45+3'; Kagere 52', 67'	Report

National Stadium, Dar es Salaam
Referee: Joshua Bondo (Botswana)
12 January 2019
21:00 UTC+2

Al-Ahly (Egypt)	2–0	(Democratic Republic of the Congo) AS Vita Club
Maher 65'; Maâloul 79' (pen.)	Report

Borg El Arab Stadium, Alexandria
Attendance: 10,000
Referee: Sadok Selmi (Tunisia)

18 January 2019
20:00 UTC+1

JS Saoura (Algeria)	1–1	(Egypt) Al-Ahly
Yahia-Chérif 59'	Report	Nedvěd 85'

Stade 20 Août 1955, Béchar
Attendance: 20,000
Referee: Eric Otogo-Castane (Gabon)
19 January 2019
17:00 UTC+1

AS Vita Club (Democratic Republic of the Congo)	5–0	(Tanzania) Simba
Mundele 14', 74'; Bompunga 19'; Ngoma 45+4' (pen.); Kupa 71'	Report

Stade des Martyrs, Kinshasa
Referee: Mahamadou Keita (Mali)

2 February 2019
17:00 UTC+1

AS Vita Club (Democratic Republic of the Congo)	2–2	(Algeria) JS Saoura
Kasengu 14'; Mundele 37'	Report	Hammia 45' (pen.); Yahia-Chérif 88'

Stade des Martyrs, Kinshasa
Referee: Hélder Martins de Carvalho (Angola)
2 February 2019
21:00 UTC+2

Al-Ahly (Egypt)	5–0	(Tanzania) Simba
El Solia 3'; Maâloul 23'; Ajayi 31'; Nedvěd 33', 40'	Report

Borg El Arab Stadium, Alexandria
Attendance: 12,000
Referee: Maguette N'Diaye (Senegal)

12 February 2019
16:00 UTC+3

Simba (Tanzania)	1–0	(Egypt) Al-Ahly
Kagere 65'	Report

National Stadium, Dar es Salaam
Referee: Mahmood Ali Mahmood Ismail (Sudan)
12 February 2019
20:00 UTC+1

JS Saoura (Algeria)	1–0	(Democratic Republic of the Congo) AS Vita Club
Hammar 78'	Report

Stade 20 Août 1955, Béchar
Referee: Louis Hakizimana (Rwanda)

9 March 2019
17:00 UTC+1

AS Vita Club (Democratic Republic of the Congo)	1–0	(Egypt) Al-Ahly
Kisinda 84'	Report

Stade des Martyrs, Kinshasa
Referee: Victor Gomes (South Africa)
9 March 2019
20:00 UTC+1

JS Saoura (Algeria)	2–0	(Tanzania) Simba
Yahia-Chérif 18'; Hammia 51' (pen.)	Report

Stade 20 Août 1955, Béchar
Referee: Jean-Jacques Ndala Ngambo (DR Congo)

16 March 2019
18:00 UTC+2

Al-Ahly (Egypt)	3–0	(Algeria) JS Saoura
Talah 30' (o.g.); M. Mohsen 45+2'; El Shahat 81'	Report

Borg El Arab Stadium, Alexandria
Attendance: 20,000
Referee: Sadok Selmi (Tunisia)
16 March 2019
19:00 UTC+3

Simba (Tanzania)	2–1	(Democratic Republic of the Congo) AS Vita Club
Husseini 36'; Chama 90'	Report	Kasengu 13'

National Stadium, Dar es Salaam
Referee: Noureddine El Jaafari (Morocco)
