= 2018–19 CAF Champions League knockout stage =

The 2018–19 CAF Champions League knockout stage were played from 6 April to 31 May 2019. A total of eight teams competed in the knockout stage to decide the champions of the 2018–19 CAF Champions League.

== Qualified teams ==
The winners and runners-up of each of the four groups in the group stage advanced to the quarter-finals.

Group	Winners	Runners-up
A	(Morocco) Wydad AC	(South Africa) Mamelodi Sundowns
B	(Tunisia) Espérance de Tunis	(Guinea) Horoya
C	(Democratic Republic of the Congo) TP Mazembe	(Algeria) CS Constantine
D	(Egypt) Al-Ahly	(Tanzania) Simba

== Format ==
Each tie in the knockout phase was played over two legs, with each team playing one leg at home. The team that scored more goals on aggregate over the two legs advanced to the next round. If the aggregate score was level, the away goals rule was applied, i.e. the team that scored more goals away from home over the two legs advanced. If away goals were also equal, then extra time was not played and the winners were decided by a penalty shoot-out (Regulations III. 26 & 27).

== Schedule ==
The schedule of each round was as follows. Effective from the Champions League group stage, weekend matches were played on Fridays and Saturdays while midweek matches were played on Tuesdays, with some exceptions. Kick-off times were also fixed at 13:00 (Saturdays and Tuesdays only), 16:00 and 19:00 GMT.

Round	First leg	Second leg
Quarter-finals	6 April 2019	13 April 2019
Semi-finals	26–27 April 2019	4 May 2019
Final	24 May 2019	31 May 2019

== Bracket ==
The bracket of the knockout stage was determined as follows:

Round	Matchups
Quarter-finals	(Group winners hosted second leg, matchups decided by draw, teams from same group could not play each other): QF1; QF2; QF3; QF4
Semi-finals	(Matchups and order of legs decided by draw, between winners QF1, QF2, QF3, QF4): SF1; SF2
Final	(Winners SF1 hosted first leg, Winners SF2 hosted second leg): Winner SF1 vs. Winner SF2

The bracket was decided after the draw for the knockout stage (quarter-finals and semi-finals), which was held on 20 March 2019, 20:00 CAT (UTC+2), at the Marriot Hotel in Cairo, Egypt.

Quarter-finals
(Guinea) Horoya	0	0	0
(Morocco) Wydad AC	0	5	5
(South Africa) Mamelodi Sundowns	5	0	5
(Egypt) Al-Ahly	0	1	1
(Algeria) CS Constantine	2	1	3
(Tunisia) Espérance de Tunis	3	3	6
(Tanzania) Simba	0	1	1
(Democratic Republic of the Congo) TP Mazembe	0	4	4

Semi-finals
(Morocco) Wydad AC	2	0	2
(South Africa) Mamelodi Sundowns	1	0	1
(Tunisia) Espérance de Tunis	1	0	1
(Democratic Republic of the Congo) TP Mazembe	0	0	0

Final
(Morocco) Wydad AC	1	abd.
(Tunisia) Espérance de Tunis	1	abd.	awd.

== Quarter-finals ==
In the quarter-finals, the winners of one group played the runners-up of another group (teams from same group could not play each other), with the group winners hosting the second leg, and the matchups decided by draw.

Team 1	Agg.	Team 2	1st leg	2nd leg
CS Constantine (Algeria)	3–6	(Tunisia) Espérance de Tunis	2–3	1–3
Mamelodi Sundowns (South Africa)	5–1	(Egypt) Al-Ahly	5–0	0–1
Horoya (Guinea)	0–5	(Morocco) Wydad AC	0–0	0–5
Simba (Tanzania)	1–4	(Democratic Republic of the Congo) TP Mazembe	0–0	1–4

6 April 2019
20:00 UTC+1

CS Constantine (Algeria)	2–3	(Tunisia) Espérance de Tunis
Djabout 49'; Yettou 71'	Report	Belaïli 6' (pen.); Coulibaly 47'; Yacoubi 74'

Stade Mohamed Hamlaoui, Constantine
Referee: Gehad Grisha (Egypt)
13 April 2019
20:00 UTC+1

Espérance de Tunis (Tunisia)	3–1	(Algeria) CS Constantine
Bguir 23', 27'; Kom 86'	Report	Bahamboula 62'

Stade Olympique de Radès, Tunis
Referee: Noureddine El Jaafari (Morocco)

Espérance de Tunis won 6–3 on aggregate.

6 April 2019
15:00 UTC+2

Mamelodi Sundowns (South Africa)	5–0	(Egypt) Al-Ahly
Zwane 14'; Arendse 24'; Nascimento 47' (pen.); Sirino 61'; Mahlambi 83'	Report

Lucas Masterpieces Moripe Stadium, Pretoria
Referee: Maguette N'Diaye (Senegal)
13 April 2019
18:00 UTC+2

Al-Ahly (Egypt)	1–0	(South Africa) Mamelodi Sundowns
Azaro 68'	Report

Borg El Arab Stadium, Alexandria
Attendance: 50,000
Referee: Bakary Gassama (Gambia)

Mamelodi Sundowns won 5–1 on aggregate.

6 April 2019
16:00 UTC+0

Horoya (Guinea)	0–0	(Morocco) Wydad AC
	Report

Stade du 28 Septembre, Conakry
Referee: Eric Otogo-Castane (Gabon)
13 April 2019
20:00 UTC+1

Wydad AC (Morocco)	5–0	(Guinea) Horoya
El Karti 20', 30'; Noussir 34'; Nahiri 59'; El Moutaraji 85'	Report

Prince Moulay Abdellah Stadium, Rabat
Referee: Bamlak Tessema Weyesa (Ethiopia)

Wydad AC won 5–0 on aggregate.

6 April 2019
16:00 UTC+3

Simba (Tanzania)	0–0	(Democratic Republic of the Congo) TP Mazembe
	Report

National Stadium, Dar es Salaam
Referee: Mustapha Ghorbal (Algeria)
13 April 2019
15:00 UTC+2

TP Mazembe (Democratic Republic of the Congo)	4–1	(Tanzania) Simba
Chongo 23'; Elia 38'; Mputu 62'; Muleka 75'	Report	Okwi 2'

Stade TP Mazembe, Lubumbashi
Referee: Janny Sikazwe (Zambia)

TP Mazembe won 4–1 on aggregate.

== Semi-finals ==
In the semi-finals, the four quarter-final winners played in two ties, with the matchups and order of legs decided by draw.

Team 1	Agg.	Team 2	1st leg	2nd leg
Wydad AC (Morocco)	2–1	(South Africa) Mamelodi Sundowns	2–1	0–0
Espérance de Tunis (Tunisia)	1–0	(Democratic Republic of the Congo) TP Mazembe	1–0	0–0

26 April 2019
20:00 UTC+1

Wydad AC (Morocco)	2–1	(South Africa) Mamelodi Sundowns
Saidi 26'; Aouk 47'	Report	Ngcongca 42'

Prince Moulay Abdellah Stadium, Rabat
Referee: Joshua Bondo (Botswana)
4 May 2019
15:00 UTC+2

Mamelodi Sundowns (South Africa)	0–0	(Morocco) Wydad AC
	Report

Lucas Masterpieces Moripe Stadium, Pretoria
Referee: Hélder Martins de Carvalho (Angola)

Wydad AC won 2–1 on aggregate.

27 April 2019
17:00 UTC+1

Espérance de Tunis (Tunisia)	1–0	(Democratic Republic of the Congo) TP Mazembe
Belaïli 51'	Report

Stade Olympique de Radès, Tunis
Referee: Bakary Gassama (Gambia)
4 May 2019
15:00 UTC+2

TP Mazembe (Democratic Republic of the Congo)	0–0	(Tunisia) Espérance de Tunis
	Report

Stade TP Mazembe, Lubumbashi
Referee: Victor Gomes (South Africa)

Espérance de Tunis won 1–0 on aggregate.

== Final ==
In the final, the two semi-final winners play each other, with the order of legs determined by the semi-final draw.

24 May 2019
22:00 UTC+0

Wydad AC (Morocco)	1–1	(Tunisia) Espérance de Tunis
Comara 79'	Report	Coulibaly 44'

Prince Moulay Abdellah Stadium, Rabat
Attendance: 50,000
Referee: Gehad Grisha (Egypt)
31 May 2019
22:00 UTC+1

Espérance de Tunis (Tunisia)	Abandoned at the result 1–0 (Note: With the score 1–0 in favor of Espérance de Tunis in the 59th minute, Walid El Karti scored a goal for Wydad AC which was subsequently ruled offside by the linesman. Due to a failure of the video assistant referee system, a review of the decision could not be conducted. Believing the goal was valid, Wydad AC protested the decision and the match was interrupted. After 80 minutes of stoppage, the referee ruled the match as a forfeit by Wydad AC and awarded to Espérance de Tunis, securing them the CAF Champions League title. However, on 5 June 2019 the CAF Executive Committee ordered a replay of the second leg at a neutral venue, requiring Espérance de Tunis to return the trophy and medals. However, the decision to order a replay of the second leg was thrown out by the Court of Arbitration for Sport (CAS) on 31 July 2019, who required CAF to refer the case to its proper disciplinary structures for a decision. On 7 August 2019, Espérance de Tunis were again officially declared champions after the CAF Disciplinary Board ruled that Wydad AC "is considered to have lost the game in the 2nd leg." On 18 September 2020, CAS dismissed Wydad AC's appeal over the final and confirmed Espérance de Tunis as champions.)	(Morocco) Wydad AC
Belaïli 41'	Report

Stade Olympique de Radès, Tunis
Attendance: 60,000
Referee: Bakary Gassama (Gambia)

Espérance de Tunis were declared champions after second leg was abandoned.
