= 2019 Champions League =

2019 Champions League may refer to:

== Football ==
- 2018–19 UEFA Champions League
- 2019–20 UEFA Champions League
- 2019 AFC Champions League
- 2018–19 CAF Champions League
- 2019–20 CAF Champions League
