= 2019 CAF Champions League =

2019 CAF Champions League may refer to:

- 2018–19 CAF Champions League
- 2019–20 CAF Champions League
