= 2018 Malian Cup =

Tournament details
- Country: Mali

Final positions
- Champions: Stade Malien

The 2018 Coupe du Mali is the 57th edition of the Coupe du Mali, the knockout football competition of Mali.

== Round of 32 ==
AS Salmamy 0-2 1-5 Stade Malien

Renaissance G. 0-2 1-2 CASS (Mopti)

CO Bamako 14-0 6-0 Tériya de San

Djoliba 6-0 1-0 Renaissance H.

C. Salif Kéïta 4-1 0-2 AS Douanes de Sikasso

FC Naman 2-2 1-7 Elwidji

AS Alençon 1-1 0-1 FC Flambeau

AFE 4-0 5-0 Bronconi AC

AS Réal 1-0 0-0 US Bougouni

ASO Messira 10-0 2-0 AS Zégué

FC Balanzan 2-0 2-1 FC Simbo

CMB 1-0 0-0 Tombouctou FC

Académie Kayes 0-3 0-2 CS Duguwolofila

USC Kita 2-0 unk AS Performance [USC Kita qualified]

Sonni 2-3 unk US Sévaré [US Sévaré qualified]

Bakaridjan 2-2 unk AS Yiriba [AS Yiriba qualified]

== Round of 16 ==
[Aug 14]

Djoliba 6-0 FC Balanzan de Ségou

[Aug 15]

CASS (Mopti) 0-2 AFE

US Sévaré 1-5 CO Bamako

Stade Malien 4-0 AS Elwidji de Kidal

ASO Messira 4-0 Centre Maliano-Belge

CS Duguwolofila 1-1 AS Réal [5-4 pen]

AS Yiriba 1-2 Centre Salif Kéïta

USC Kita 2-0 FC Flambeau

== Quarterfinals ==
[Aug 25]

CO Bamako 2-1 Centre Salif Kéïta

AFE 1-0 CS Duguwolofila

[Aug 26]

ASO Messira 0-3 Stade Malien

[Sep 2]

Djoliba 5-0 USC Kita

== Semifinals ==
[Sep 15]

CO Bamako 1-1 Stade Malien [aet, 9-10 pen]

[Sep 16]

AFE 0-1 Djoliba

== Final ==
[Sep 23]

Stade Malien 2-1 Djoliba

As the league was not played in 2018, the cup winners qualify for the 2018–19 CAF Champions League and the cup runners-up qualify for the 2018–19 CAF Confederation Cup.
