= 2018–19 CAF Champions League =

2018–19 Total CAF Champions League

Tournament details
- Dates: 27 November 2018 – 31 May 2019
- Teams: 57 (from 46 associations)

Final positions
- Champions: (Tunisia) Espérance de Tunis (4th title)
- Runners-up: (Morocco) Wydad AC

Tournament statistics
- Matches played: 144
- Goals scored: 338 (2.35 per match)
- Top scorer: (South Africa) Themba Zwane (5 goals)

The 2018–19 CAF Champions League (officially the 2018–19 Total CAF Champions League for sponsorship reasons) was the 55th edition of Africa's premier club football tournament organized by the Confederation of African Football (CAF), and the 23rd edition under the current CAF Champions League title.

This season followed a transitional calendar which allows the CAF club competitions to switch from a February-to-November schedule to an August–to-May schedule, as per the decision of the CAF Executive Committee on 20 July 2017. It began in December 2018, right after the 2018 season had finished, and ended in May 2019, before the 2019 Africa Cup of Nations (which had been switched from a January/February to a June/July date). The next season then started after the Africa Cup of Nations and followed the new calendar.

Defending champions Espérance de Tunis won a second consecutive title, being declared the winners after their second leg match against Wydad AC in the final was abandoned.

As winners of the 2018–19 CAF Champions League, Espérance de Tunis qualified for the 2019 FIFA Club World Cup in Qatar, and earned the right to play against the winners of the 2018–19 CAF Confederation Cup, Zamalek, in the 2020 CAF Super Cup.

== Association team allocation ==
All 56 CAF member associations may enter the CAF Champions League, with the 12 highest ranked associations according to their CAF 5-year ranking eligible to enter two teams in the competition. As a result, theoretically a maximum of 68 teams could enter the tournament – although this level has never been reached.

For the 2018–19 CAF Champions League, the CAF uses the 2013–2017 CAF 5-year ranking, which calculates points for each entrant association based on their clubs' performance over those 5 years in the CAF Champions League and CAF Confederation Cup. The criteria for points are the following:

	CAF Champions League	CAF Confederation Cup
Winners	6 points	5 points
Runners-up	5 points	4 points
Losing semi-finalists	4 points	3 points
Losing quarter-finalists (from 2017)	3 points	2 points
3rd place in groups	2 points	1 point
4th place in groups	1 point	0.5 point

The points are multiplied by a coefficient according to the year as follows:

- 2017 – 5
- 2016 – 4
- 2015 – 3
- 2014 – 2
- 2013 – 1

== Teams ==
The following 57 teams from 46 associations entered the competition.

- For this season, the title holders (in **bold italics**) receive a bye to the group stage.
- Four teams (in **bold**) received a bye to the first round.
- The other 52 teams entered the preliminary round.

Associations are shown according to their 2013–2017 CAF 5-year ranking – those with a ranking score have their rank and score indicated.

Associations eligible to enter two teams (Ranked 1–12)
Association	Team	Qualifying method
Tunisia (1st – 116 pts)	**Espérance de Tunis**	Title holders (2018 CAF Champions League winners); 2017–18 Tunisian Ligue Professionnelle 1 champions
Tunisia (1st – 116 pts)	Club Africain	2017–18 Tunisian Ligue Professionnelle 1 runners-up
Egypt (2nd – 106.5 pts)	**Al-Ahly**	2017–18 Egyptian Premier League champions
Egypt (2nd – 106.5 pts)	Ismaily	2017–18 Egyptian Premier League runners-up
DR Congo (3rd – 90 pts)	**AS Vita Club**	2017–18 Linafoot champions
DR Congo (3rd – 90 pts)	**TP Mazembe**	2017–18 Linafoot runners-up
Morocco (4th – 84 pts)	Ittihad Tanger	2017–18 Botola champions
Morocco (4th – 84 pts)	**Wydad AC**	2017–18 Botola runners-up
Algeria (5th – 82.5 pts)	CS Constantine	2017–18 Algerian Ligue Professionnelle 1 champions
Algeria (5th – 82.5 pts)	JS Saoura	2017–18 Algerian Ligue Professionnelle 1 runners-up
South Africa (6th – 78.5 pts)	Mamelodi Sundowns	2017–18 South African Premier Division champions
South Africa (6th – 78.5 pts)	Orlando Pirates	2017–18 South African Premier Division runners-up
Sudan (7th – 53 pts)	Al-Hilal	2018 Sudan Premier League champions
Sudan (7th – 53 pts)	Al-Merrikh	2018 Sudan Premier League runners-up
Zambia (8th – 38 pts)	ZESCO United	2018 Zambia Super League champions
Zambia (8th – 38 pts)	Nkana	2018 Zambia Super League runners-up
Libya (9th – 19 pts)	Al-Nasr	2017–18 Libyan Premier League champions
Libya (9th – 19 pts)	Al-Ahly Benghazi	2017–18 Libyan Premier League runners-up
Cameroon (T-10th – 15 pts)	Coton Sport	2018 Elite One champions
Cameroon (T-10th – 15 pts)	UMS de Loum	2018 Elite One runners-up
Ivory Coast (T-10th – 15 pts)	ASEC Mimosas	2017–18 Côte d'Ivoire Ligue 1 champions
Ivory Coast (T-10th – 15 pts)	SC Gagnoa	2017–18 Côte d'Ivoire Ligue 1 runners-up
Mozambique (T-10th – 15 pts)	UD Songo (one entrant only)	2017 Moçambola champions

Associations eligible to enter one team
Association	Team	Qualifying method
Ethiopia (T-13th – 10.5 pts)	Jimma Aba Jifar	2017–18 Ethiopian Premier League champions
Nigeria (T-13th – 10.5 pts)	Lobi Stars	2018 Nigeria Professional Football League first place
Congo (15th – 10 pts)	AS Otohô	2018 Congo Ligue 1 champions
Mali (16th – 8 pts)	Stade Malien	2018 Malian Cup winners
Angola (17th – 6 pts)	1º de Agosto	2018 Girabola champions
Guinea (T-18th – 5 pts)	Horoya	2017–18 Guinée Championnat National champions
Eswatini (T-18th – 5 pts)	Mbabane Swallows	2017–18 Swazi Premier League champions
Uganda (T-18th – 5 pts)	Vipers	2017–18 Uganda Premier League champions
Zimbabwe (T-18th – 5 pts)	FC Platinum	2017 Zimbabwe Premier Soccer League champions
Gabon (23rd – 2.5 pts)	AS Mangasport	2018 Gabon Championnat National D1 champions
Tanzania (24th – 2 pts)	Simba	2017–18 Tanzanian Premier League champions
Botswana	Township Rollers	2017–18 Botswana Premier League champions
Burkina Faso	ASF Bobo Dioulasso	2017–18 Burkinabé Premier League champions
Burundi	Le Messager Ngozi	2017–18 Burundi Premier League champions
Central African Republic	Stade Centrafricaine	2018 Central African Republic League champions
Chad	Elect-Sport	2018 Chad Premier League champions
Comoros	Volcan Club	2018 Comoros Premier League champions
Djibouti	Djibouti Télécom	2017–18 Djibouti Premier League champions
Equatorial Guinea	Leones Vegetarianos	2018 Equatoguinean Primera División champions
Gambia	GAMTEL	2017–18 GFA League First Division champions
Kenya	Gor Mahia	2018 Kenyan Premier League champions
Lesotho	Bantu	2017–18 Lesotho Premier League champions
Liberia	Barrack Young Controllers	2018 Liberian First Division League champions
Madagascar	CNaPS Sport	2018 THB Champions League champions
Malawi	Nyasa Big Bullets	2017 Malawi Premier Division runners-up
Mauritania	FC Nouadhibou	2017–18 Ligue 1 Mauritania champions
Namibia	African Stars	2017–18 Namibia Premier League champions
Niger	AS SONIDEP	2017–18 Niger Premier League champions
Rwanda	APR	2017–18 Rwanda Premier League champions
Senegal	ASC Diaraf	2017–18 Senegal Premier League champions
Seychelles	Light Stars	2018 Seychelles League Cup winners
South Sudan	Al-Hilal Wau	2018 South Sudan Football Championship champions
Togo	US Koroki	2017–18 Togolese Championnat National champions
Zanzibar	JKU	2017–18 Zanzibar Premier League champions

Notes

1. Malawi (MWI): Malawi were represented by Nyasa Big Bullets, the 2017 Malawi Premier Division runners-up, as the 2018 Malawi Premier Division was not finished in time for the 2018–19 CAF competitions (Be Forward Wanderers, the 2017 Malawi Premier Division champions, chose not to enter).
2. Mali (MLI): Mali were represented by Stade Malien, the 2018 Malian Cup winners, as the Malian Première Division was not played in 2018.
3. Mozambique (MOZ): Mozambique were represented by UD Songo, the 2017 Moçambola champions, as the 2018 Moçambola was not finished in time for the 2018–19 CAF competitions (other teams chose not to enter despite Mozambique eligible for two entrants).
4. Nigeria (NGA): Nigeria were represented by Lobi Stars, the 2018 Nigeria Professional Football League leaders after 24 rounds when the league was deemed concluded, following a decision by the Nigeria Professional Football League.
5. Seychelles (SEY): Seychelles were represented by Light Stars, the 2018 Seychelles League Cup winners, as the 2018 Seychelles First Division was not finished in time for the 2018–19 CAF competitions.
6. Zimbabwe (ZIM): Zimbabwe were represented by FC Platinum, the 2017 Zimbabwe Premier Soccer League champions, as the 2018 Zimbabwe Premier Soccer League was not finished in time for the 2018–19 CAF competitions.

Associations which did not enter a team

- Benin
- Cape Verde
- Eritrea
- Ghana (22nd – 4 pts)
- Guinea-Bissau
- Mauritius
- Réunion
- São Tomé and Príncipe
- Sierra Leone (suspended by FIFA)
- Somalia
Location of teams of the 2018–19 CAF Champions League.
Red: Preliminary round; Green: First Round;
Brown: Group A; Orange: Group B; Yellow: Group C; Blue: Group D.

== Schedule ==
The schedule of the competition was as follows (matches scheduled in midweek in italics). Effective from the Champions League group stage, weekend matches were played on Fridays and Saturdays while midweek matches were played on Tuesdays, with some exceptions. Kick-off times were also fixed at 13:00 (Saturdays and Tuesdays only), 16:00 and 19:00 GMT.

Phase	Round	Draw date	First leg	Second leg
Qualifying	Preliminary round	3 November 2018 (Rabat, Morocco)	27–28 November 2018	4–5 December 2018
Qualifying	First round	3 November 2018 (Rabat, Morocco)	14–16 December 2018	21–23 December 2018
Group stage	Matchday 1	28 December 2018 (Cairo, Egypt)	11–12 January 2019	
Group stage	Matchday 2	28 December 2018 (Cairo, Egypt)	18–19 January 2019	
Group stage	Matchday 3	28 December 2018 (Cairo, Egypt)	1–2 February 2019	
Group stage	Matchday 4	28 December 2018 (Cairo, Egypt)	12 February 2019	
Group stage	Matchday 5	28 December 2018 (Cairo, Egypt)	8–9 March 2019	
Group stage	Matchday 6	28 December 2018 (Cairo, Egypt)	15–16 March 2019	
Knockout stage	Quarter-finals	20 March 2019 (Cairo, Egypt)	5–6 April 2019	12–13 April 2019
Knockout stage	Semi-finals	20 March 2019 (Cairo, Egypt)	26–27 April 2019	3–4 May 2019
Knockout stage	Final	20 March 2019 (Cairo, Egypt)	24–25 May 2019	31 May – 1 June 2019

== Qualifying rounds ==
The draw for the preliminary round and first round was held on 3 November 2018 in Rabat, Morocco, and was officially announced by the CAF on 9 November due to a special situation with the transitional calendar. In the qualifying rounds, each tie was played on a home-and-away two-legged basis. If the aggregate score was tied after the second leg, the away goals rule would be applied, and if still tied, extra time would not be played, and the penalty shoot-out would be used to determine the winner (Regulations III. 13 & 14).

=== Preliminary round ===
Team 1	Agg.	Team 2	1st leg	2nd leg
ASC Diaraf (Senegal)	1–1 (4–2 p)	(Togo) US Koroki	1–0	0–1
JS Saoura (Algeria)	2–0	(Ivory Coast) SC Gagnoa	2–0	0–0
Ittihad Tanger (Morocco)	1–0	(Chad) Elect-Sport	1–0	0–0
Le Messager Ngozi (Burundi)	1–3	(Egypt) Ismaily	0–1	1–2
ASF Bobo Dioulasso (Burkina Faso)	4–4 (3–5 p)	(Cameroon) Coton Sport	3–1	1–3
AS SONIDEP (Niger)	1–5	(Zambia) ZESCO United	1–2	0–3
Orlando Pirates (South Africa)	8–2	(Seychelles) Light Stars	5–1	3–1
Volcan Club (Comoros)	1–2	(Namibia) African Stars	0–0	1–2
FC Nouadhibou (Mauritania)	2–3	(Libya) Al-Ahly Benghazi	2–1	0–2
Leones Vegetarianos (Equatorial Guinea)	1–7	(South Africa) Mamelodi Sundowns	0–2	1–5
Gor Mahia (Kenya)	1–1 (4–3 p)	(Malawi) Nyasa Big Bullets	1–0	0–1
UMS de Loum (Cameroon)	1–2	(Nigeria) Lobi Stars	1–0	0–2
UD Songo (Mozambique)	1–3	(Zambia) Nkana	1–2	0–1
Simba (Tanzania)	8–1	(Eswatini) Mbabane Swallows	4–1	4–0
ASAS Djibouti Télécom	3–5	(Ethiopia) Jimma Aba Jifar	1–3	2–2
CS Constantine (Algeria)	1–0	(The Gambia) GAMTEL	0–0	1–0
Al-Merrikh (Sudan)	2–2 (a)	(Uganda) Vipers	2–1	0–1
Stade Centrafricaine (Central African Republic)	0–5	(Mali) Stade Malien	0–1	0–4
ASEC Mimosas (Ivory Coast)	1–0	(Gabon) AS Mangasport	1–0	0–0
Township Rollers (Botswana)	2–2 (2–4 p)	(Lesotho) Bantu	1–1	1–1
APR (Rwanda)	1–3	(Tunisia) Club Africain	0–0	1–3
Al-Hilal (Sudan)	6–0	(Zanzibar) JKU	4–0	2–0
Al-Nasr (Libya)	9–3	(South Sudan) Al-Hilal Wau	5–1	4–2
Horoya (Guinea)	2–0	(Liberia) Barrack Young Controllers	1–0	1–0
1º de Agosto (Angola)	4–4 (a)	(Republic of the Congo) AS Otohô	4–2	0–2
CNaPS Sport (Madagascar)	1–2	(Zimbabwe) FC Platinum	1–1	0–1

=== First round ===
The 15 winners of the first round advanced to the group stage to join Espérance de Tunis, who received a bye to the group stage as the title holders, while the 15 losers of the first round entered the Confederation Cup play-off round.

Team 1	Agg.	Team 2	1st leg	2nd leg
Wydad AC (Morocco)	3–3 (a)	(Senegal) ASC Diaraf	2–0	1–3
JS Saoura (Algeria)	2–1	(Morocco) Ittihad Tanger	2–0	0–1
Ismaily (Egypt)	3–2	(Cameroon) Coton Sport	2–0	1–2
TP Mazembe (Democratic Republic of the Congo)	2–1	(Zambia) ZESCO United	1–0	1–1
Orlando Pirates (South Africa)	1–0	(Namibia) African Stars	0–0	1–0
Al-Ahly Benghazi (Libya)	0–4	(South Africa) Mamelodi Sundowns	0–0	0–4
Gor Mahia (Kenya)	3–3 (a)	(Nigeria) Lobi Stars	3–1	0–2
Nkana (Zambia)	3–4	(Tanzania) Simba	2–1	1–3
Al-Ahly (Egypt)	2–1	(Ethiopia) Jimma Aba Jifar	2–0	0–1
CS Constantine (Algeria)	3–0	(Uganda) Vipers	1–0	2–0
Stade Malien (Mali)	0–2	(Ivory Coast) ASEC Mimosas	0–1	0–1
AS Vita Club (Democratic Republic of the Congo)	5–2	(Lesotho) Bantu	4–1	1–1
Club Africain (Tunisia)	3–2	(Sudan) Al-Hilal	3–1	0–1
Al-Nasr (Libya)	5–6	(Guinea) Horoya	3–0	2–6
AS Otohô (Republic of the Congo)	1–1 (a)	(Zimbabwe) FC Platinum	1–1	0–0

== Group stage ==
The draw for the group stage was held on 28 December 2018, 19:00 CAT (UTC+2), at the Nile Ritz-Carlton in Cairo, Egypt. The 16 teams, including the title holders, Espérance de Tunis, and the 15 winners of the first round of qualifying, were drawn into four groups of four.

The teams were seeded by their performances in the CAF competitions for the previous five seasons (CAF 5-year ranking points shown in parentheses). Each group contained one team from each of Pot 1, Pot 2, Pot 3, and Pot 4, and each team was drawn into one of the positions in their group.

Pot	Pot 1	Pot 2	Pot 3	Pot 4
Teams	(Democratic Republic of the Congo) TP Mazembe (66 pts); (Egypt) Al-Ahly (62 pts); (Morocco) Wydad AC (51 pts); (Tunisia) Espérance de Tunis (45 pts)	(South Africa) Mamelodi Sundowns (40 pts); (Democratic Republic of the Congo) AS Vita Club (29 pts); (Guinea) Horoya (19 pts); (Tunisia) Club Africain (12 pts)	(Ivory Coast) ASEC Mimosas (8.5 pts); (South Africa) Orlando Pirates (8 pts); (Tanzania) Simba; (Algeria) CS Constantine	(Egypt) Ismaily; (Nigeria) Lobi Stars; (Zimbabwe) FC Platinum; (Algeria) JS Saoura

In the group stage, each group was played on a home-and-away round-robin basis. The winners and runners-up of each group advanced to the quarter-finals of the knockout stage.

Tiebreakers
The teams were ranked according to points (3 points for a win, 1 point for a draw, 0 points for a loss). If tied on points, tiebreakers were applied in the following order (Regulations III. 20 & 21):
1. Points in head-to-head matches among tied teams;
2. Goal difference in head-to-head matches among tied teams;
3. Goals scored in head-to-head matches among tied teams;
4. Away goals scored in head-to-head matches among tied teams;
5. If more than two teams are tied, and after applying all head-to-head criteria above, a subset of teams are still tied, all head-to-head criteria above are reapplied exclusively to this subset of teams;
6. Goal difference in all group matches;
7. Goals scored in all group matches;
8. Away goals scored in all group matches;
9. Drawing of lots.

=== Group A ===
Pos	Team	Pld	W	D	L	GF	GA	GD	Pts	Qualification	WAC	MSD	LOB	ASE
1	(Morocco) Wydad AC	6	3	1	2	8	6	+2	10 (Note: Head-to-head away goals scored: Wydad AC 1, Mamelodi Sundowns 0.)	Quarter-finals	—	1–0	0–0	5–2
2	(South Africa) Mamelodi Sundowns	6	3	1	2	9	5	+4	10	Quarter-finals	2–1	—	3–0	3–1
3	(Nigeria) Lobi Stars	6	2	1	3	4	6	−2	7 (Note: Head-to-head goal difference: Lobi Stars +1, ASEC Mimosas –1.)		0–1	2–1	—	2–0
4	(Ivory Coast) ASEC Mimosas	6	2	1	3	6	10	−4	7		2–0	0–0	1–0	—

Source: CAF

=== Group B ===
Pos	Team	Pld	W	D	L	GF	GA	GD	Pts	Qualification	EST	HOR	ORL	PLA
1	(Tunisia) Espérance de Tunis	6	4	2	0	9	2	+7	14	Quarter-finals	—	2–0	2–0	2–0
2	(Guinea) Horoya	6	3	1	2	6	7	−1	10	Quarter-finals	1–1	—	2–1	2–0
3	(South Africa) Orlando Pirates	6	1	3	2	6	6	0	6		0–0	3–0	—	2–2
4	(Zimbabwe) FC Platinum	6	0	2	4	3	9	−6	2		1–2	0–1	0–0	—

Source: CAF

=== Group C ===
Pos	Team	Pld	W	D	L	GF	GA	GD	Pts	Qualification	TPM	CSC	CA	ISM
1	(Democratic Republic of the Congo) TP Mazembe	6	3	2	1	13	4	+9	11	Quarter-finals	—	2–0	8–0	2–0
2	(Algeria) CS Constantine	6	3	1	2	8	6	+2	10 (Note: Goal difference in all group matches: CS Constantine +2, Club Africain –4.)	Quarter-finals	3–0	—	0–1	3–2
3	(Tunisia) Club Africain	6	3	1	2	5	9	−4	10		0–0	0–1	—	1–0
4	(Egypt) Ismaily (Note: The CAF announced on 23 January 2019 that Ismaily were disqualified for aggressive fans behaviors, including consistently throwing rocks and water bottles on the assistant referee and the away fans, and other incidents at their home match against Club Africain on 18 January 2019. All results of matches played by Ismaily were annulled and not taken into consideration according to the regulations. However, following an appeal by Ismaily, the CAF decided on 10 February 2019 to reinstate Ismaily to the competition.)	6	0	2	4	4	11	−7	2		1–1	1–1	0–3 (awd.) (Note: On 19 February 2019, following the suspension of the match involving Ismaily and Club Africain due to the aggressive behaviors Ismaily fans shown during the match, CAF decided to consider the match forfeited by Ismaily with a result of 3–0 in favour of Club Africain. The match was originally suspended on the 83rd minute with the score 1–2 for Club Africain.)	—

Source: CAF

=== Group D ===
Pos	Team	Pld	W	D	L	GF	GA	GD	Pts	Qualification	AHL	SIM	JSS	VIT
1	(Egypt) Al-Ahly	6	3	1	2	11	3	+8	10	Quarter-finals	—	5–0	3–0	2–0
2	(Tanzania) Simba	6	3	0	3	6	13	−7	9	Quarter-finals	1–0	—	3–0	2–1
3	(Algeria) JS Saoura	6	2	2	2	6	9	−3	8		1–1	2–0	—	1–0
4	(Democratic Republic of the Congo) AS Vita Club	6	2	1	3	9	7	+2	7		1–0	5–0	2–2	—

Source: CAF

== Knockout stage ==
Each tie in the knockout phase was played over two legs, with each team playing one leg at home. The team that scored more goals on aggregate over the two legs advanced to the next round. If the aggregate score was level, the away goals rule was applied, i.e. the team that scored more goals away from home over the two legs advanced. If away goals were also equal, then extra time was not played and the winners were decided by a penalty shoot-out (Regulations III. 26 & 27).

=== Bracket ===
The bracket was decided after the draw for the knockout stage (quarter-finals and semi-finals), which was held on 20 March 2019, 20:00 CAT (UTC+2), at the Marriot Hotel in Cairo, Egypt.

Quarter-finals
(Guinea) Horoya	0	0	0
(Morocco) Wydad AC	0	5	5
(South Africa) Mamelodi Sundowns	5	0	5
(Egypt) Al-Ahly	0	1	1
(Algeria) CS Constantine	2	1	3
(Tunisia) Espérance de Tunis	3	3	6
(Tanzania) Simba	0	1	1
(Democratic Republic of the Congo) TP Mazembe	0	4	4

Semi-finals
(Morocco) Wydad AC	2	0	2
(South Africa) Mamelodi Sundowns	1	0	1
(Tunisia) Espérance de Tunis	1	0	1
(Democratic Republic of the Congo) TP Mazembe	0	0	0

Final
(Morocco) Wydad AC	1	abd.
(Tunisia) Espérance de Tunis	1	abd.	awd.

=== Quarter-finals ===
In the quarter-finals, the winners of one group played the runners-up of another group (teams from same group could not play each other), with the group winners hosting the second leg, and the matchups decided by draw.

Team 1	Agg.	Team 2	1st leg	2nd leg
CS Constantine (Algeria)	3–6	(Tunisia) Espérance de Tunis	2–3	1–3
Mamelodi Sundowns (South Africa)	5–1	(Egypt) Al-Ahly	5–0	0–1
Horoya (Guinea)	0–5	(Morocco) Wydad AC	0–0	0–5
Simba (Tanzania)	1–4	(Democratic Republic of the Congo) TP Mazembe	0–0	1–4

=== Semi-finals ===
In the semi-finals, the four quarter-final winners played in two ties, with the matchups and order of legs decided by draw.

Team 1	Agg.	Team 2	1st leg	2nd leg
Wydad AC (Morocco)	2–1	(South Africa) Mamelodi Sundowns	2–1	0–0
Espérance de Tunis (Tunisia)	1–0	(Democratic Republic of the Congo) TP Mazembe	1–0	0–0

=== Final ===
In the final, the two semi-final winners play each other, with the order of legs determined by the semi-final draw.

24 May 2019
22:00 UTC+0

Wydad AC (Morocco)	1–1	(Tunisia) Espérance de Tunis
Comara 79'	Report	Coulibaly 44'

Prince Moulay Abdellah Stadium, Rabat
Attendance: 50,000
Referee: Gehad Grisha (Egypt)
31 May 2019
22:00 UTC+1

Espérance de Tunis (Tunisia)	Abandoned (Note: With the score 1–0 in favor of Espérance de Tunis in the 59th minute, Walid El Karti scored a goal for Wydad AC which was subsequently ruled offside by the linesman. Due to a failure of the video assistant referee system, a review of the decision could not be conducted. Believing the goal was valid, Wydad AC protested the decision and the match was interrupted. After 80 minutes of stoppage, the referee ruled the match as a forfeit by Wydad and awarded the win to Espérance de Tunis, securing them the CAF Champions League title. However, on 5 June 2019, the CAF Executive Committee ordered a replay of the second leg at a neutral venue, requiring Espérance de Tunis to return the trophy and medals. However, the decision to order a replay of the second leg was quashed by the Court of Arbitration for Sport (CAS) on 31 July 2019, who required CAF to refer the case to its proper disciplinary structures for a decision. On 7 August 2019, Espérance de Tunis was again officially declared champions after the CAF Disciplinary Board ruled that Wydad "is considered to have lost the game in the 2nd leg." On 18 September 2020, CAS dismissed Wydad's appeal over the final and confirmed Espérance de Tunis as champions.) (1–0)	(Morocco) Wydad AC
Belaïli 41'	Report

Stade Olympique de Radès, Tunis
Attendance: 60,000
Referee: Bakary Gassama (Gambia)

Espérance de Tunis were declared champions after second leg was abandoned.

== Top goalscorers ==
Team eliminated / inactive for this round.

Rank	Player	Team	MD1	MD2	MD3	MD4	MD5	MD6	QF1	QF2	SF1	SF2	F1	F2	Total
1	(South Africa) Themba Zwane	(South Africa) Mamelodi Sundowns		2	1		1		1						5
2	(Democratic Republic of the Congo) Trésor Mputu	(Democratic Republic of the Congo) TP Mazembe			2			1		1					4
2	(Democratic Republic of the Congo) Jackson Muleka	(Democratic Republic of the Congo) TP Mazembe			2			1		1					4
2	(Morocco) Mohamed Nahiri	(Morocco) Wydad AC		1	1			1		1					4
5	(Tunisia) Ghazi Ayadi	(Tunisia) Club Africain		2				1							3
5	(Algeria) Youcef Belaïli	(Tunisia) Espérance de Tunis							1			1		1	3
5	(Morocco) Walid El Karti	(Morocco) Wydad AC	1							2					3
5	(Democratic Republic of the Congo) Meschak Elia	(Democratic Republic of the Congo) TP Mazembe			1		1			1					3
5	(Rwanda) Meddie Kagere	(Tanzania) Simba	2			1									3
5	(Democratic Republic of the Congo) Kévin Mondeko	(Democratic Republic of the Congo) TP Mazembe	1		2										3
5	(Democratic Republic of the Congo) Jean-Marc Makusu Mundele	(Democratic Republic of the Congo) AS Vita Club		2	1										3
5	(Egypt) Nedvěd	(Egypt) Al-Ahly		1		2									3
5	(Namibia) Benson Shilongo	(Egypt) Ismaily		1	1	1									3
5	(Zambia) Justin Shonga	(South Africa) Orlando Pirates		2				1							3
5	(Algeria) Sid Ali Yahia-Chérif	(Algeria) JS Saoura		1	1		1								3

== See also ==
- 2018–19 CAF Confederation Cup
- 2020 CAF Super Cup
- 2019 FIFA Club World Cup
