= Hamed Hervé Diomandé =

Ivorian footballer

Hervé Diomandé
Personal information
- Full name: Hamed Hervé Diomandé
- Date of birth: 17 June 1988 (age 38)
- Place of birth: Odienne, Ivory Coast
- Height: 1.83 m (6 ft 0 in)
- Position: Midfielder

Team information
- Current team: ASEC Mimosas
- Number: 15

Senior career*
Years	Team	Apps	(Gls)
2005–2012	ASEC Mimosas		
2012–2013	Hassania Agadir		
2015–2017	SC Gagnoa		
2017–2019	ASEC Mimosas		

International career
2016–2018	Ivory Coast	4	(0)
- * Club domestic league appearances and goals as of 6 August 2019

Hamed Hervé Diomandé (born 17 June 1988) is an Ivorian former professional footballer who played as a midfielder.

== Honours ==
ASEC Mimosas

- Côte d'Ivoire Premier Division: 2006, 2009, 2010, 2018.
- Côte d'Ivoire Cup: 2007, 2008, 2011
- Félix Houphouët-Boigny Cup: 2006, 2007, 2008, 2009, 2011
