= Ghazi Ayadi =

Tunisian footballer

Personal information
- Date of birth: 19 July 1996 (age 30)
- Height: 1.79 m (5 ft 10 in)
- Position: Midfielder

Youth career
- Club Africain

Senior career*
Years	Team	Apps	(Gls)
2013–2020	Club Africain	84	(6)
2020	Damac	10	(0)
2021–2023	Al-Ittihad	0	(0)
2023	Al-Kawkab		
2023–2025	Stade Tunisien	29	(3)
2026	Abu Salim	7	(1)

International career^{‡}
2018–	Tunisia	1	(0)
- * Club domestic league appearances and goals as of 23:33, 19 July 2026 (UTC) ‡ National team caps and goals as of 20:31, 20 February 2021 (UTC)

Ghazi Ayadi (born 19 July 1996) is a Tunisian footballer who plays as a midfielder.

== Club career ==
He began his career with Club Africain. On 6 March 2020, he signed for Saudi club Damac.

On 26 December 2022, Ayadi joined Al-Kawkab.

On 24 July 2023, Ayadi joined Stade Tunisien on a two-year contract.

In February 2026 he signed for Libyan club Abu Salim.

== International career ==
He made his international debut for Tunisia in 2018.
