= Michael Babatunde =

Nigerian footballer (born 1992)

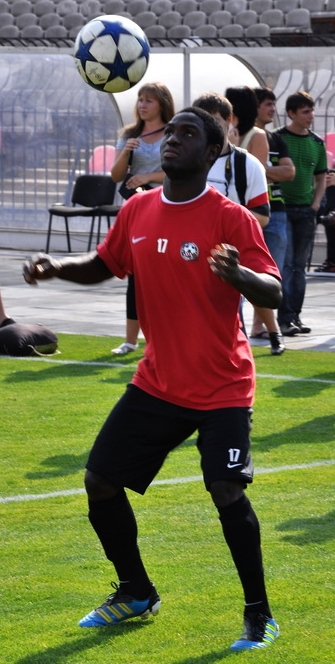
- Babatunde with Kryvbas Kryvyi Rih in 2011

Personal information
- Date of birth: 24 December 1992 (age 33)
- Place of birth: Lagos, Nigeria
- Height: 1.79 m (5 ft 10 1/2 in)
- Position: Winger

Team information
- Current team: Dhaka Abahani
- Number: 12

Youth career
- Water FC

Senior career*
Years	Team	Apps	(Gls)
2010	Heartland	29	(15)
2011–2013	Kryvbas Kryvyi Rih	44	(2)
2013–2015	Volyn Lutsk	36	(4)
2015	Dnipro Dnipropetrovsk	2	(0)
2015–2016	Raja Casablanca	14	(3)
2016–2018	Qatar SC	25	(20)
2018–2021	Wydad AC	32	(12)
2022–2023	Laçi	24	(2)
2024	Mash’al Mubarek	19	(3)
2025	KS Pogradeci	9	(1)
2026–	Dhaka Abahani	0	(0)

International career^{‡}
2013–2016	Nigeria	11	(0)
- * Club domestic league appearances and goals as of 29 August 2026 ‡ National team caps and goals as of 18 February 2026

Michael Babatunde (born 24 December 1992) is a Nigerian footballer who plays as a winger for Bangladesh Premier League club Dhaka Abahani.

He began his playing career in Nigeria before playing for clubs in Ukraine, Morocco, and Qatar. He also represented the Nigeria national team, participating in the 2013 FIFA Confederations Cup and the 2014 FIFA World Cup.

== Club career ==
Babatunde moved to Ukraine in 2011, joining Kryvbas Kryvyi Rih and beginning his career in Europe. He later played for Volyn Lutsk, and on 13 August 2015, he signed a one-year contract with Dnipro. Upon joining Dnipro, he described the club as one of the biggest clubs in Ukraine and said that playing for the club had been his dream.

In December 2015, Babatunde joined Raja Casablanca in Morocco. He played in the Botola Pro during the 2015–16 season, scoring three goals. His performances as a foreign player attracted attention in the Moroccan league's foreign player category at the end of the season.

On 31 May 2016, he moved to Qatar SC, a club in the Qatar Stars League. Qatar SC were in the second tier at the time, and Babatunde helped the team earn promotion, finishing as runners-up in the 2016–17 Qatar Second Division and securing promotion to the top flight.

In 2018, he returned to Morocco and signed a three-year contract with Wydad AC. With Wydad AC, he won the Botola Pro title in the 2018–19 season and also reached the final of the CAF Champions League in the same season.

== International career ==
Babatunde played for the Nigeria national team from 2013 to 2016. He made his debut at the 2013 FIFA Confederations Cup, coming on as a substitute in Nigeria's group-stage match against Uruguay.

At the 2014 FIFA World Cup in Brazil, he appeared in the group-stage matches against Iran, Bosnia and Herzegovina, and Argentina. He featured against Bosnia and Herzegovina and Argentina during the group stage, as Nigeria finished second in the group and advanced to the round of 16.

Babatunde continued to represent Nigeria and in May 2016, he appeared in friendly matches against Mali and Luxembourg. He made a total of 11 appearances for the national team.

== Honours ==
Qatar SC

- Qatari Second Division: 2016–17

Wydad

- Botola: 2018–19
- CAF Champions League runner-up: 2018–19
