= Sid Ali Yahia-Chérif =

Algerian footballer (born 1985)

Personal information
- Full name: Sid Ali Yahia-Chérif
- Date of birth: January 4, 1985 (age 41)
- Place of birth: Hydra, Algiers, Algeria
- Height: 1.85 m (6 ft 1 in)
- Position: Forward

Youth career
- ES Kouba
- ES Ben Aknoun
- 2003–2005: RC Kouba

Senior career*
Years	Team	Apps	(Gls)
2005–2009	RC Kouba	95	(27)
2009–2011	JS Kabylie	68	(13)
2011–2013	Istres	77	(16)
2013–2014	MC Alger	32	(2)
2014–2015	JSM Béjaïa	16	(10)
2015–2017	CR Belouizdad	63	(10)
2017–2021	JS Saoura	98	(25)
2021–2025	RC Kouba	0	(0)
2025–2026	JS El Biar	0	(0)

International career^{‡}
2008–2011	Algeria A'	6	(1)
- * Club domestic league appearances and goals as of 14 November 2025 ‡ National team caps and goals as of 00:00, September 24, 2013 (EST)

Sid Ali «Alilou» Yahia-Chérif, (born January 4, 1985) is an Algerian football player

== Club career ==
Growing up in Algiers, Yahia-Chérif began playing on the streets and in neighborhood tournaments. He played briefly for two local sides: ES Kouba and ES Ben Aknoun. In 2003, at age 18, he signed with the RC Kouba junior team, quickly making his mark at the club, and just two years later, he was promoted to the senior side. In the 2007/2008 season, Yahia-Chérif helped the club win promotion to the top flight. However, they would be relegated the following season with Yahia-Chérif leaving the club at the end of the 2008/2009 season.

=== JS Kabylie ===
In the summer of 2009, he was linked with a move to a number of French clubs including AS Monaco, FC Metz, FC Istres and Stade Reims. However, Yahia-Chérif chose to stay close to home, signing a three-year contract with JS Kabylie.

In his first season with the club, he made 31 league appearances, scoring 10 goals, as JS Kabylie finished third in the domestic league. He also played a role in the teams run to the semi-finals of the 2010 CAF Champions League. In the first round of the competition, he scored the only goal in the return leg against Tunisian side Club Africain as JS Kabylie won 1-0 and advanced 2–1 on aggregate.

In his second season, he made just 10 league appearances and failed to find the back of the net. However, on May 1, 2011, he started in the 2011 Algerian Cup Final, as JS Kabylie went on to win 1–0 against USM El Harrach, to win its first Algerian Cup since 1994.

=== FC Istres ===
On 6 July 2011, Yahia-Chérif signed a three-year contract with French Ligue 2 side Istres.

== International career ==
On April 17, 2008, he was called up to the Algerian A' National Team for a qualifier against Morocco for the 2009 African Championship of Nations. He was the only player in the squad playing in the second division. He has also been capped for Algeria at the Under-23 level.

== Honours ==
- Won the Algerian Cup once with JS Kabylie in 2011
- Won the Algerian Cup once with CR Belouizdad in 2017
- Won the Algerian cup once with MC Alger in 2014
