= Fousseny Coulibaly =

Ivorian footballer (born 1992)

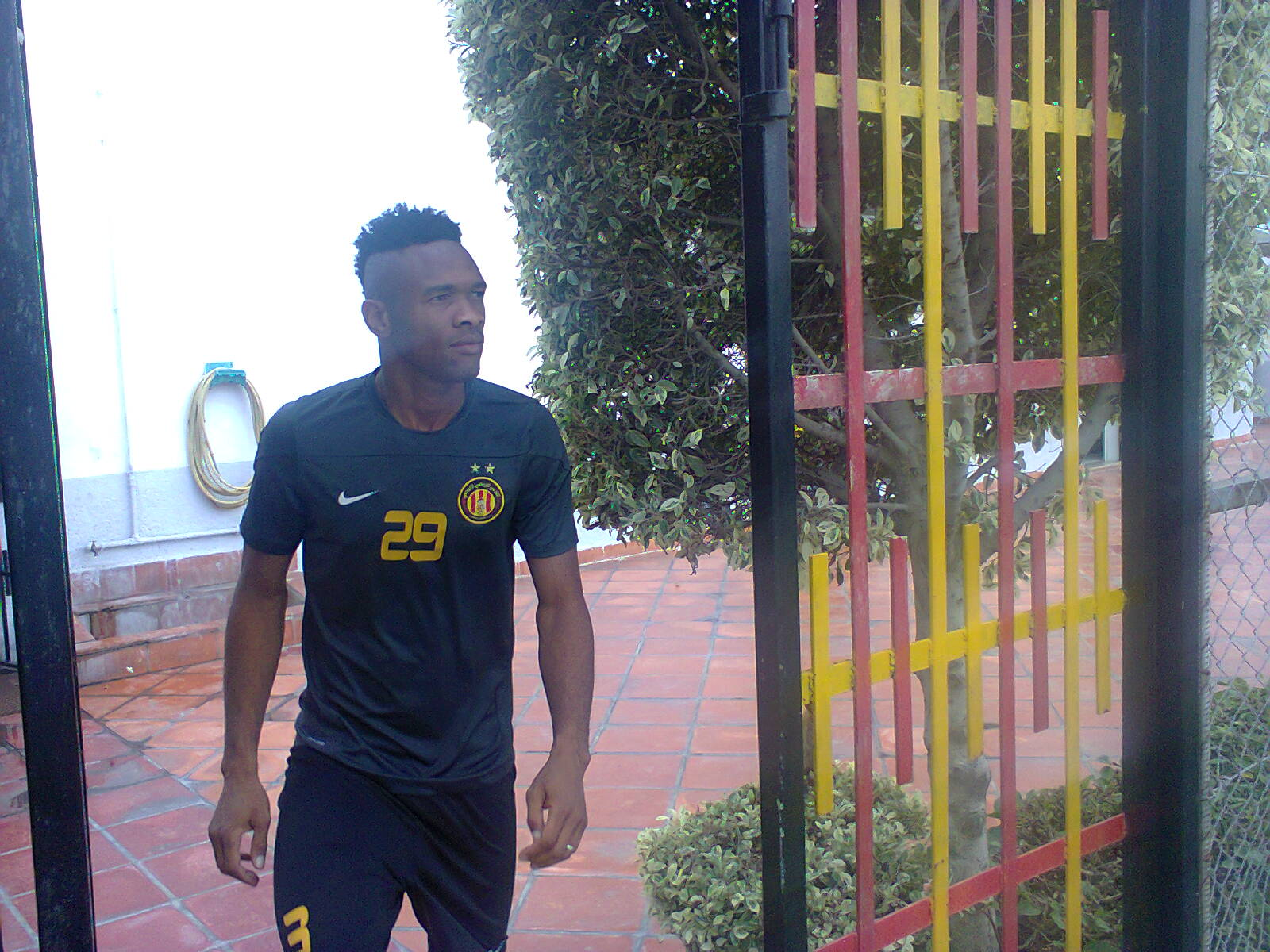
- Coulibaly in 2015

Personal information
- Full name: Fousseny Coulibaly
- Date of birth: 12 December 1992 (age 33)
- Place of birth: Ivory Coast
- Height: 1.93 m (6 ft 4 in)
- Position: Midfielder

Senior career*
Years	Team	Apps	(Gls)
2010–2013	Stella Club		
2013–2014	Union Monastirienne	28	(2)
2014–2023	Espérance de Tunis	175	(8)
2015	→ Stade Tunisien (loan)	7	(0)

International career^{‡}
2013–2022	Ivory Coast	4	(0)
- * Club domestic league appearances and goals as of 30 June 2023 ‡ National team caps and goals as of 15:08, 14 March 2026 (UTC)

Fousseny Coulibaly (born 12 December 1992) is an Ivorian professional footballer who plays as a midfielder.

== Club career ==
Coulibaly has played for Stella Club, Union Monastirienne, Espérance de Tunis and Stade Tunisien.

== International career ==
Coulibaly made one appearance for Ivory Coast in 2013. In December 2017 he announced his intention to apply for Tunisian citizenship and to represesent the Tunisian national team. In February 2018 it was announced that Coulibaly's application would not be processed in time for the 2018 FIFA World Cup. He made his return to the Ivorian team during the 2021 Africa Cup of Nations qualification, appeared as a substitution in Ivory Coast's 3–0 win over Niger.
