= Eric Otogo-Castane =

Gabonese football referee (born 1976)

Eric Otogo-Castane (born 13 April 1976) is a Gabonese association football referee.

He was one of the referees for the Africa Cup of Nations in 2013, 2015, 2017, and 2019.
