= Cheick Comara =

Ivorian footballer

Personal information
- Full name: Cheick Ibrahim Comara
- Date of birth: 14 October 1993 (age 33)
- Place of birth: Abidjan, Ivory Coast
- Height: 1.83 m (6 ft 0 in)
- Position: Defender

Team information
- Current team: Al-Jandal
- Number: 3

Senior career*
Years	Team	Apps	(Gls)
2012–2014	CO Korhogo		
2014–2017	Academie de Foot Amadou Diallo		
2017	Ekenäs IF	7	(0)
2017–2022	Wydad AC	85	(6)
2022–2024	Al-Arabi	57	(3)
2024–	Al-Jandal	11	(0)

International career^{‡}
2015–	Ivory Coast	11	(0)
- * Club domestic league appearances and goals as of 11 June 2024 ‡ National team caps and goals as of 11:48, 14 July 2019 (UTC)

Cheick Ibrahim Comara (born 14 October 1993) is an Ivorian professional footballer who plays for Saudi Arabian club Al-Jandal and the Ivory Coast national team. He participated in the 2017 FIFA Club World Cup, with Wydad Casablanca, representing the CAF.

== Career statistics ==
=== Club ===
As of 27 November 2024.

Appearances and goals by club, season and competition
Club	Season	League			Cup (Note: Includes Suomen Cup, Moroccan Throne Cup and Saudi King's Cup)		Continental		Other		Total	
Club	Season	Division	Apps	Goals	Apps	Goals	Apps	Goals	Apps	Goals	Apps	Goals
Ekenäs IF	2017	Ykkönen	7	0	0	0	–		–		7	0
Wydad	2017–18	Botola Pro	22	1	0	0	11 (Note: Includes FIFA Club World Cup, CAF Super Cup and CAF Champions League)	1	–		33	2
Wydad	2018–19	Botola Pro	23	2	3	0	11 (Note: Includes CAF Champions League)	1	–		37	3
Wydad	2019–20	Botola Pro	14	2	1	0	10	0	–		25	2
Wydad	2020–21	Botola Pro	9	0	0	0	6	0	–		15	0
Wydad	2021–22	Botola Pro	16	1	2	0	4	0	–		22	1
Wydad	2022–23	Botola Pro	1	0	0	0	0	0	–		1	0
Wydad	Total		85	6	6	0	42	2	0	0	133	8
Al-Arabi	2022–23	Saudi First Division	28	2	–		–		–		28	2
Al-Arabi	2023–24	Saudi First Division	29	1	1	0	–		–		30	1
Al-Arabi	Total		57	3	1	0	0	0	0	0	58	3
Al-Jandal	2024–25	Saudi First Division	11	0	2	0	–		–		13	0
Career total			160	9	9	0	42	2	0	0	211	11

=== International ===
As of matches played on 14 July 2019

Ivory Coast
Year	Apps	Goals
2015	1	0
2016	7	0
2017	1	0
2018	0	0
2019	2	0
Total	11	0
