= Badie Aouk =

Moroccan footballer

Personal information
- Full name: Badie Aouk
- Date of birth: 29 March 1995 (age 31)
- Place of birth: Agadir, Morocco
- Height: 1.66 m (5 ft 5 in)
- Position: Winger

Team information
- Current team: Olympique Dcheira
- Number: 17

Senior career*
Years	Team	Apps	(Gls)
2014–2018	Hassania Agadir	88	(28)
2018–2023	Wydad AC	96	(13)
2023-2024	Union Touarga		
2025-2026	Kenitra AC		
2026-	Olympique Dcheira		

International career
2015–	Morocco U23	5	(3)
- * Club domestic league appearances and goals

Badi Aouk (born 29 March 1995) is a Moroccan professional footballer who plays as a winger for Kenitra AC.
