= Mohamed Nahiri =

Moroccan footballer

Personal information
- Full name: Mohamed Nahiri
- Date of birth: 22 October 1991 (age 35)
- Place of birth: El Jadida, Morocco
- Height: 1.80 m (5 ft 11 in)
- Positions: Full-back; midfielder

Team information
- Current team: Raja CA
- Number: 16

Senior career*
Years	Team	Apps	(Gls)
2011–2013	DHJ	6	(0)
2013–2017	FUS Rabat	113	(15)
2018–2020	Wydad AC	97	(33)
2020–2021	Al-Ain	15	(0)
2021–	Raja CA	40	(7)

International career^{‡}
2014	Morocco U23	5	(1)
2014–	Morocco A'	17	(2)
Medal record
Men's football
Representing Morocco
African Nations Championship
Winner	2018 Morocco
- * Club domestic league appearances and goals as of 26 June 2023 ‡ National team caps and goals as of 26 June 2023

Mohamed Nahiri (born 22 October 1991) is a Moroccan professional footballer who plays for Botola Pro side Raja as a full-back and midfielder.

== International career ==
Scores and results list Morocco's goal tally first.

No.	Date	Venue	Opponent	Score	Result	Competition
1.	19 October 2019	Stade Municipal, Berkane, Morocco	Algeria	3–0	3–0	2020 African Nations Championship qualification
2.	1 December 2021	Al Janoub Stadium, Al Wakrah, Qatar	Palestine	1–0	4–0	2021 FIFA Arab Cup
3.	11 December 2021	Al Thumama Stadium, Doha, Qatar	Algeria	1–1	2–2	2021 FIFA Arab Cup

== Honours ==
Fus Rabat

- Botola: 2015–16
- Moroccan Throne Cup: 2014

Wydad Casablanca

- Botola Pro: 2018–19
- CAF Super Cup: 2018

Morocco

- African Nations Championship: 2018
