= 2019–20 Wydad AC season =

Wydad AC
2019–20 season
- President: Said Naciri
- Manager: Zoran Manojlovic (until 13 January 2020); Sébastien Desabre (from 21 January 2020) (until 24 February 2020); Juan Carlos Garrido (from 25 February 2020) (until 10 September 2020); Miguel Ángel Gamondi (from 10 September 2020)
- Stadium: Stade Mohamed V
- Botola: Runners-up
- Throne Cup: Round of 32
- Club Championship: Second round
- Champions League: Semi-finals
- Top goalscorer: League: Kazadi Kasengu (8 goals); All: Ayoub El Kaabi (10 goals)
Home colours	Away colours	Third colours

The 2019–20 season is Wydad AC's 80th season in their existence and the club's 64th consecutive season in the top flight of Moroccan football. They have competed in the Botola, the Champions League, Arab Club Champions Cup, and the Throne Cup. The season started on 14 September 2019, and was scheduled to end on 1 July 2020. However, the season was suspended in March 2020, due to COVID-19 pandemic in Morocco, then resumed in July and ended in 11 October 2020. Wydad drew an average home attendance of 25,305 in the 2019–20 edition of the Moroccan top-flight football league.

== Competitions ==
=== Overview ===
Competition	Record								Started round	Final position / round	First match	Last match
Competition	G	W	D	L	GF	GA	GD	Win %	Started round	Final position / round	First match	Last match
Botola	30	17	8	5	52	28	+24	56.67	—N/a	Runners–up	6 October 2019	11 October 2020
Throne Cup	1	0	0	1	1	3	−2	0.00	Round of 32		24 September 2019	
Arab Club Champions Cup	4	1	3	0	8	6	+2	25.00	First round	Second round	31 August 2019	23 November 2019
Champions League	12	5	3	4	19	13	+6	41.67	First round	Semi-finals	15 September 2019	23 October 2020
Total	47	23	14	10	80	50	+30	48.94				

Updated to match played 23 October 2020
Source: Competitions

== League table ==
Pos	Team	Pld	W	D	L	GF	GA	GD	Pts	Qualification or relegation
1	Raja Casablanca (C, Q)	30	17	9	4	43	23	+20	60	Qualification for Champions League
2	Wydad Casablanca (Q)	30	17	8	5	52	28	+24	59	Qualification for Champions League
3	RS Berkane (Q)	30	15	12	3	35	23	+12	57	Qualification for Confederation Cup
4	FUS Rabat	30	13	10	7	39	30	+9	49	
5	Mouloudia Oujda	30	12	12	6	35	28	+7	48	

Updated to match(es) played on 11 October 2020. Source: frmf.ma
Rules for classification: 1) Points; 2) Head-to-head points; 3) Head-to-head goal difference; 4) Goal difference; 5) Goals scored; 6) Fair-play points; 7) Play-off.
(C) Champions; (Q) Qualified for the phase indicated

=== Results summary ===
Overall								Home						Away					
Pld	W	D	L	GF	GA	GD	Pts	W	D	L	GF	GA	GD	W	D	L	GF	GA	GD
30	17	8	5	52	28	+24	59	9	4	2	28	13	+15	8	4	3	24	15	+9

Last updated: 11 October 2020.
Source: Competitive matches

=== Results by round ===
Round	1	2	3	4	5	6	7	8	9	10	11	12	13	14	15	16	17	18	19	20	21	22	23	24	25	26	27	28	29	30
Ground	A	H	H	A	H	A	H	A	H	A	H	A	H	A	H	H	A	A	H	A	H	A	H	A	H	A	H	A	H	A
Result	W	W	W	D	L	W	W	W	D	L	W	W	W	W	D	L	L	W	D	L	W	D	W	W	D	D	W	D	W	W
Position	4	2	1	1	2	2	2	1	2	2	2	2	1	1	1	1	1	1	1	2	2	2	2	2	2	2	2	2	2	2

Updated to match(es) played on 24 February 2020. Source: Competitive matches
A = Away; H = Home; W = Win; D = Draw; L = Loss

=== Matches ===
Unless otherwise noted, all times in WAT
Win Draw Loss

6 October 2019 Round 1	Difaâ El Jadidi	0–1	Wydad AC	El Jadida
20:00		Soccerway report	Nahiri 21' (pen.)	Stadium: Stade Ben Ahmed El-Abdi; Referee: Adil Zourak

27 October 2019 Round 2	Wydad AC	3–1	Youssoufia Berrechid	Casablanca
17:00	Tighazoui 8'; El Kaabi 73'; Babatunde 89'	Soccerway report	Fati 63'	Stadium: Stade Mohammed V Referee: Mohamed Nhayeh

6 November 2019 Round 3	Wydad AC	4–0	IR Tanger	Casablanca
19:00	El Kaabi 12', 66'; El Moutaraji 21'; Babatunde 71'	Soccerway report		Stadium: Stade Mohammed V Referee: Yassine Bouslim

23 October 2019 Round 4	Mouloudia Oujda	1–1	Wydad AC	Oujda
18:00	Khafi 29' (pen.)	Soccerway report	Haddad 16'	Stadium: Honneur Stadium; Referee: Abdelaziz Lamsallek

10 November 2019 Round 5	Wydad AC	0–1	RS Berkane	Casablanca
17:00		Soccerway report	Dayo 42'	Stadium: Stade Mohammed V Referee: Daki Reddad

11 December 2019 Round 6	Olympique Khouribga	0–4	Wydad AC	Khouribga
17:00		Soccerway report	Babatunde 6', 75'; Gaddarine 13'; Haddad 16'	Stadium: Stade du Phosphate; Referee: Abdelaziz Lamsallek

15 December 2019 Round 7	Wydad AC	1–0	FAR de Rabat	Casablanca
17:00	Aouk 69' (pen.)	Soccerway report		Stadium: Stade Mohammed V Referee: Hicham Tamsamani

18 December 2019 Round 8	Raja Beni Mellal	1–2	Wydad AC	Oued Zem
15:00	Jaadi 8'	Soccerway report	El Kaabi 29'; Aouk 34'	Stadium: Stade Municipal; Referee: Jamal Belbasri

5 January 2020 Round 9	Wydad AC	1–1	Nahdat Zemamra	Casablanca
17:00	Aouk 53' (pen.)	Soccerway report	Atchabao 38'	Stadium: Stade Mohammed V Referee: Rédouane Jiyed

22 December 2019 Round 10	Raja Casablanca	1–0	Wydad AC	Casablanca
15:00	Ahadad 81'	Soccerway report		Stadium: Stade Mohammed V Referee: Rédouane Jiyed

2 January 2020 Round 11	Wydad AC	2–1	Moghreb Tétouan	Casablanca
19:00	Kasengu 63', 79'	Soccerway report	Lakhal 76' (pen.)	Stadium: Stade Mohammed V Referee: Abderrahim Yaagoubi

20 January 2020 Round 12	Olympic Safi	1–2	Wydad AC	Safi
19:00	Al Gaadaoui 33'	Soccerway report	Kasengu 55', 88'	Stadium: Stade El Massira; Referee: Abdelaziz Lamsallek

16 January 2020 Round 13	Wydad AC	3–2	Hassania Agadir	Casablanca
19:00	Jabrane 36' (pen.); Kasengu 62'; Asrir 80'	Soccerway report	El Berkaoui 40', 46'	Stadium: Stade Mohammed V Referee: Yassine Bouslim

6 February 2020 Round 14	Rapide Oued Zem	1–2	Wydad AC	Oued Zem
15:00	El Bahraoui 60'	Soccerway report	El Moutaraji 19'; Jabrane 90+3' (pen.)	Stadium: Stade Municipal; Referee: Rédouane Jiyed

10 February 2020 Round 15	Wydad AC	1–1	FUS Rabat	Casablanca
17:00	Comara 29'	Soccerway report	Zerhouni 84'	Stadium: Stade Mohammed V Referee: Adil Zourak

15 February 2020 Round 16	Wydad AC	0–1	Difaâ El Jadidi	Casablanca
19:00		Soccerway report	Msuva 20'	Stadium: Stade Mohammed V Referee: Mohamed Nhayeh

22 February 2020 Round 17	Youssoufia Berrechid	3–2	Wydad AC	Berrechid
17:00	Aboulfath 44'; Niani 62', 67'	Soccerway report	Gbagbo 59', 63'	Stadium: Stade Municipal de Berrechid; Referee: Abderrahim Yaagoubi

12 March 2020 Round 18	IR Tanger	0–2	Wydad AC	Tangier
16:00		Soccerway report	Nahiri 63'; Jabrane 90+3' (pen.)	Stadium: Stade Ibn Batouta; Attendance: 0 (close doors); Referee: Adil Zourak
Note: due to coronavirus outbreak, Royal Moroccan Football Federation decide to play all games behind closed doors.

28 July 2020 Round 19	Wydad AC	1–1	Mouloudia Oujda	Casablanca
22:00	Comara 87'	Soccerway report	Sadaoui 43'	Stadium: Stade Mohammed V Attendance: 0 (close doors); Referee: Adil Zourak
Note: due to coronavirus outbreak, Royal Moroccan Football Federation decide to play all games behind closed doors.

6 August 2020 Round 20	RS Berkane	2–1	Wydad AC	Berkane
22:00	Nemsaoui 44'; Aziz 60' (pen.)	Soccerway report	Kasengu 14'	Stadium: Stade Municipal de Berkane; Attendance: 0 (close doors); Referee: Samir Guezzaz

10 August 2020 Round 21	Wydad AC	3–2	Olympique Khouribga	Casablanca
20:00	El Haddad 41'; Najmeddine 47'; Kasengu 70'	Soccerway report	Asrir 21' (o.g.); El Fakih 90+7' (pen.)	Stadium: Stade Mohammed V Attendance: 0 (close doors); Referee: Mohamed Ballout

9 September 2020 Round 22	FAR de Rabat	1–1	Wydad AC	Rabat
17:00	Goudali 85'	Soccerway report	El Haddad 17'	Stadium: Stade Moulay Abdellah; Attendance: 0 (close doors); Referee: Daki Reddad

16 September 2020 Round 23	Wydad AC	3–0	Raja Beni Mellal	Casablanca
21:30	El Haddad 65'; Jabrane 90+3' (pen.); El Hassouni 90+5'	Soccerway report		Stadium: Stade Mohammed V Attendance: 0 (close doors); Referee: Abdelaziz Lamsallek

20 September 2020 Round 24	Nahdat Zemamra	1–2	Wydad AC	Zemamra
19:15	Benbouabdellah 59'	Soccerway report	El Haddad 8'; Jabrane 88' (pen.)	Stadium: Stade Municipal; Attendance: 0 (close doors); Referee: Abderrahim Yaagoubi

24 September 2020 Round 25	Wydad AC	0–0	Raja Casablanca	Casablanca
19:15		Soccerway report		Stadium: Stade Mohammed V Attendance: 0 (close doors); Referee: Rédouane Jiyed

27 September 2020 Round 26	Moghreb Tétouan	1–1	Wydad AC	Tétouan
21:30	Bengoa 52'	Soccerway report	Jabrane 45+7' (pen.)	Stadium: Stade Saniat Rmel; Attendance: 0 (close doors); Referee: Slimane El Atifi

30 September 2020 Round 27	Wydad AC	4–1	Olympic Safi	Casablanca
19:00	Aouk 21', 87'; Jabrane 43' (pen.); Kasengu 76' (pen.)	Soccerway report	Khabba 82'	Stadium: Stade Mohammed V Attendance: 0 (close doors); Referee: Yassine Bouslim

4 October 2020 Round 28	Hassania Agadir	1–1	Wydad AC	Agadir
19:00	Rami 40'	Soccerway report	Jabrane 74' (pen.)	Stadium: Stade Adrar; Attendance: 0 (close doors); Referee: Daki Reddad

7 October 2020 Round 29	Wydad AC	2–1	Rapide Oued Zem	Casablanca
19:00	El Hassouni 36'; El Haddad 90'	Soccerway report	El Bahraoui 90+5'	Stadium: Stade Mohammed V Attendance: 0 (close doors); Referee: Rédouane Jiyed

11 October 2020 Round 30	FUS Rabat	1–2	Wydad AC	Rabat
19:00	Kombous 32' (pen.)	Soccerway report	Gbagbo 40'; El Moutaraji 88'	Stadium: Stade Belvédère; Attendance: 0 (close doors); Referee: Samir Guezzaz

== Moroccan Throne Cup ==
24 September 2019 Round of 32	Wydad AC	1–3	FAR de Rabat	Casablanca
20:00	El Kaabi 90'		Gnadou 50'; Slim 86', 90+3'	Stadium: Stade Mohammed V Referee: Redouane Jiyed

== Club Championship Cup ==
=== First round ===
31 August 2019	Al-Merrikh (Sudan)	1–1	(Morocco) Wydad AC	Omdurman
20:00 UTC+2	El Karti 4' (o.g.)	Report	Nahiri 45+5' (pen.)	Stadium: Al-Merrikh Stadium; Referee: Adham Makhadmeh (Jordan)

3 October 2019	Wydad AC (Morocco)	2–0 (3–1 agg.)	(Sudan) Al-Merrikh	Casablanca
20:00 UTC+1	Saidi 62'; El Amloud 75'	Report		Stadium: Stade Mohammed V Referee: Mahmoud El Banna (Egypt)

=== Second round ===
2 November 2019	Raja Casablanca (Morocco)	1–1	(Morocco) Wydad AC	Casablanca
19:00 UTC+1	Ngoma 48'	Report	El Haddad 33'	Stadium: Stade Mohammed V Referee: Mohammed Abdulla Hassan Mohamed (United Arab Emirates)
Note: Lineup for Wydad Casablanca - Tagnaouti, El Amloud, Comara, Dari, Gaddarine, Jabrane, Nekkach, El Haddad, Tighazoui, El Moutaraji, El Kaabi. (Aouk, 75') (Babatunde, 65') (El Asbahi, 82')

23 November 2019	Wydad AC (Morocco)	4–4 (5– (a) 5 agg.)	(Morocco) Raja Casablanca	Casablanca
20:00 UTC+1	Nahiri 13' (pen.); El Hassouni 55'; El Kaabi 57'; Aouk 71'	Report	Moutouali 49' (pen.), 88' (pen.); Ahaddad 74'; Malango 90+4'	Stadium: Stade Mohammed V Referee: Mahmoud El Banna (Egypt)
Note: Lineup for Wydad Casablanca - Tagnaouti, Dari, Nahiri, Comara, Nekkach, Gaddarine (El Asbahi, 77'), Babatunde (Kamal, 78'), Aouk, El Amloud, El Kaabi, El Haddad. (El Hassouni, 46')

== Champions League ==
=== First round ===
15 September 2019	FC Nouadhibou (Mauritania)	0–2	(Morocco) Wydad AC	Nouakchott
17:00 UTC+0		Report	Nahiri 34'; El Haddad 73'	Stadium: Stade Cheikha Ould Boïdiya; Referee: Kokou Ognankotan Ntale (Togo)

29 September 2019	Wydad AC (Morocco)	4–1 (6–1 agg.)	(Mauritania) FC Nouadhibou	Casablanca
20:00 UTC+1	Nahiri 13' (pen.); El Haddad 25'; El Hassouni 26'; El Kaabi 38'		Bagili 67'	Stadium: Stade Mohammed V Referee: Sadok Selmi (Tunisia)

=== Group stage ===
==== Group C ====
Pos	Team	Pld	W	D	L	GF	GA	GD	Pts	Qualification	MSD	WAC	PET	USM
1	(South Africa) Mamelodi Sundowns	6	4	2	0	9	3	+6	14	Advance to knockout stage	—	1–0	3–0	2–1
2	(Morocco) Wydad AC	6	2	3	1	10	6	+4	9	Advance to knockout stage	0–0	—	4–1	3–1
3	(Angola) Petro de Luanda	6	0	4	2	8	14	−6	4		2–2	2–2	—	1–1
4	(Algeria) USM Alger	6	0	3	3	6	10	−4	3		0–1	1–1	2–2	—

Source: CAF

30 November 2019 Matchday 1	USM Alger (Algeria)	1–1	(Morocco) Wydad AC	Blida (Note: USM Alger played their home matches at Mustapha Tchaker Stadium, Blida, and at Stade 20 Août 1955, Algiers, instead of their regular home stadium Omar Hamadi Stadium, Algiers, which did not meet CAF requirements.)
16:00 (17:00 UTC+1)	Zouari 5'	Report (Soccerway)	Aouk 89'	Stadium: Mustapha Tchaker Stadium; Referee: Bernard Camille (Seychelles)

7 December 2019 Matchday 2	Wydad AC (Morocco)	0–0	(South Africa) Mamelodi Sundowns	Casablanca
19:00 (20:00 UTC+1)		Report (Soccerway)		Stadium: Stade Mohammed V Referee: Jean-Jacques Ndala Ngambo (DR Congo)

28 December 2019 Matchday 3	Wydad AC (Morocco)	4–1	(Angola) Petro de Luanda	Casablanca
19:00 (20:00 UTC+1)	El Kaabi 29', 79', 90+3' (pen.); Wilson 84' (o.g.)	Report (Soccerway)	Toni 68'	Stadium: Stade Mohammed V Referee: Janny Sikazwe (Zambia)

11 January 2020 Matchday 4	Petro de Luanda (Angola)	2–2	(Morocco) Wydad AC	Luanda
16:00 (17:00 UTC+1)	Herenilson 21'; Dany 45+1'	Report (Soccerway)	Kasengu 14'; Jabrane 58' (pen.)	Stadium: Estádio 11 de Novembro; Referee: Kalilou Traoré (Ivory Coast)

24 January 2020 Matchday 5	Wydad AC (Morocco)	3–1	(Algeria) USM Alger	Casablanca
19:00 (20:00 UTC+1)	El Karti 7'; Aouk 24'; Kasengu 45+1'	Report (Soccerway)	Meftah 79'	Stadium: Stade Mohammed V Referee: Eric Otogo-Castane (Gabon)

1 February 2020 Matchday 6	Mamelodi Sundowns (South Africa)	1–0	(Morocco) Wydad AC	Pretoria
13:00 (15:00 UTC+2)	Nascimento 45+1' (pen.)	Report (Soccerway)		Stadium: Lucas Masterpieces Moripe Stadium; Referee: Daouda Guèye (Senegal)

=== knockout stage ===
==== Quarter-finals ====
29 February 2020	Wydad AC (Morocco)	2–0	(Tunisia) Étoile du Sahel	Casablanca
19:00 (20:00 UTC+1)	Nahiri 11', 54'	Report (Soccerway)		Stadium: Stade Mohammed V Referee: Sidi Alioum (Cameroon)

7 March 2020	Étoile du Sahel (Tunisia)	1–0 (1–2 agg.)	(Morocco) Wydad AC	Radès (Note: Étoile du Sahel play their home matches at Stade Olympique de Radès, Radès, instead of their regular home stadium Stade Olympique de Sousse, Sousse, which is undergoing renovation.)
19:00 (20:00 UTC+1)	Aribi 58'	Report (Soccerway)		Stadium: Stade Olympique de Radès; Referee: Maguette N'Diaye (Senegal)

==== Semi-finals ====
17 October 2020	Wydad AC (Morocco)	0–2	(Egypt) Al-Ahly	Casablanca
19:00 (20:00 UTC+1)		Report	Magdy 4'; Maâloul 62' (pen.)	Stadium: Stade Mohammed V Attendance: 0 (close doors); Referee: Janny Sikazwe (Zambia)

23 October 2020	Al-Ahly (Egypt)	3–1 (5–1 agg.)	(Morocco) Wydad AC	Cairo
19:00 (21:00 UTC+2)	Mohsen 5'; El Shahat 26'; Ibrahim 59'	Report	El Moutaraji 82'	Stadium: Al Ahly WE Stadium; Attendance: 0 (close doors); Referee: Victor Gomes (South Africa)

== Squad information ==
=== Playing statistics ===
As of 12 October 2020

No.	Pos	Nat	Player	Total		Botola		Throne Cup		Champions League		Championship Cup	
No.	Pos	Nat	Player	Apps	Goals	Apps	Goals	Apps	Goals	Apps	Goals	Apps	Goals
Goalkeepers
26	GK	(Morocco) MAR	Ahmed Reda Tagnaouti	40	0	30	0	0	0	8	0	2	0
27	GK	(Morocco) MAR	Aissa Sioudi	0	0	0	0	0	0	0	0	0	0
	GK	(Morocco) MAR	Yassine El Kharroubi	1	0	0	0	1	0	0	0	0	0
Defenders
2	DF	(Morocco) MAR	Anas El Asbahi	2	0	0	0	0	0	0	0	2	0
2	DF	(Morocco) MAR	Adil Rhaili	5	0	2	0	0	0	3	0	0	0
13	DF	(Morocco) MAR	Brahim Najmeddine	15	1	14	1	0	0	1	0	0	0
21	DF	(Belgium) BEL	Soufiane Karkache	2	0	2	0	0	0	0	0	0	0
22	DF	(Morocco) MAR	Ayoub El Amloud	26	0	17	0	0	0	7	0	2	0
25	DF	(Morocco) MAR	Youssef Chaina	11	0	11	0	0	0	0	0	0	0
28	DF	(Morocco) MAR	Abdelatif Noussir	19	0	15	0	1	0	3	0	0	0
29	DF	(Ivory Coast) CIV	Cheick Comara	23	2	14	2	1	0	6	0	2	0
30	DF	(Morocco) MAR	Mohamed Nahiri	12	4	7	1	1	0	3	2	1	1
Midfielders
3	MF	(Morocco) MAR	Achraf Dari	14	0	9	0	1	0	2	0	2	0
4	MF	(Morocco) MAR	Salaheddine Saidi	13	0	13	0	0	0	0	0	0	0
5	MF	(Morocco) MAR	Yahya Jabrane	33	9	23	8	1	0	8	1	1	0
6	MF	(Morocco) MAR	Brahim Nekkach	27	0	19	0	0	0	6	0	2	0
8	MF	(Morocco) MAR	Badr Gaddarine	28	1	18	1	0	0	8	0	2	0
14	MF	(Morocco) MAR	Haytham El Bahja	9	0	8	0	0	0	1	0	0	0
16	MF	(Morocco) MAR	Hamza Asrir	27	1	21	1	0	0	6	0	0	0
17	MF	(Morocco) MAR	Badie Aouk	34	8	24	5	1	0	7	2	2	1
18	MF	(Morocco) MAR	Walid El Karti	37	1	28	0	1	0	8	1	0	0
19	MF	(France) FRA	Amin Tighazoui	15	1	9	1	0	0	5	0	1	0
20	MF	(Morocco) MAR	Ayman El Hassouni	33	3	23	2	1	0	8	0	1	1
10	MF	(Nigeria) NGR	Michael Babatunde	12	4	7	4	1	0	2	0	2	0
15	MF	(Morocco) MAR	Mohamed Kamal	3	0	2	0	0	0	0	0	1	0
Forwards
	FW	(Morocco) MAR	Yahia Attiyat allah	15	0	14	0	0	0	1	0	0	0
	FW	(Nigeria) NGR	Gabriel Okechukwu	3	0	2	0	0	0	1	0	0	0
7	FW	(Morocco) MAR	Zouhair El Moutaraji	24	3	19	3	1	0	3	0	1	0
9	FW	(Democratic Republic of the Congo) COD	Kazadi Kasengu	22	10	18	8	0	0	4	2	0	0
15	FW	(Uganda) UGA	Joel Madondo	2	0	2	0	0	0	0	0	0	0
11	FW	(Morocco) MAR	Ismail El Haddad	30	8	21	7	1	0	6	0	2	1
15	FW	(Ivory Coast) CIV	Laurent Magby Gbagbo	10	3	8	3	0	0	2	0	0	0
33	FW	(Morocco) MAR	Mohammed Saidani	8	0	8	0	0	0	0	0	0	0
Players transferred out during the season
	FW	(Morocco) MAR	Ayoub El Kaabi	15	9	9	4	1	1	3	3	2	1

Last updated: 8 June 2019
Source: fr.soccerway.com

=== Goalscorers ===
Includes all competitive matches. The list is sorted alphabetically by surname when total goals are equal.

No.	Nat.	Player	Pos.	B 1	TC	ACC	CL 1	TOTAL
	(Morocco)	Ayoub El Kaabi	FW	4	1	1	4	10
9	(Democratic Republic of the Congo)	Kazadi Kasengu	FW	8	0	0	2	10
11	(Morocco)	Ismail El Haddad	FW	7	0	1	2	10
5	(Morocco)	Yahya Jabrane	MF	8	0	0	1	9
30	(Morocco)	Mohamed Nahiri	DF	2	0	2	4	8
17	(Morocco)	Badie Aouk	MF	5	0	1	2	8
9	(Nigeria)	Michael Babatunde	FW	4	0	0	0	4
20	(Morocco)	Ayman El Hassouni	MF	2	0	1	1	4
7	(Morocco)	Zouhair El Moutaraji	FW	3	0	0	1	4
15	(Ivory Coast)	Laurent Magby Gbagbo	FW	3	0	0	0	3
29	(Ivory Coast)	Cheick Comara	DF	2	0	0	0	2
16	(Morocco)	Hamza Asrir	MF	1	0	0	0	1
8	(Morocco)	Badr Gaddarine	MF	1	0	0	0	1
19	(France)	Amin Tighazoui	MF	1	0	0	0	1
13	(France)	Brahim Najmeddine	DF	1	0	0	0	1
4	(Morocco)	Salaheddine Saidi	MF	0	0	1	0	1
18	(Morocco)	Walid El Karti	MF	0	0	0	1	1
22	(Morocco)	Ayoub El Amloud	DF	0	0	1	0	1
Own Goals				0	0	0	1	1
Totals				52	1	8	19	80

== Squad list ==
Players and squad numbers last updated on 8 January 2020. Note: Flags indicate national team as defined under FIFA eligibility rules; some limited exceptions apply. Players may hold more than one non-FIFA nationality.

No.	Pos.	Nation	Player
1	GK	MAR	Yanis Henin
26	GK	MAR	Ahmed Reda Tagnaouti
27	GK	MAR	Aissa Sioudi
–	GK	MAR	Yassine El Kharroubi
2	DF	MAR	Adil Rhaili
3	DF	MAR	Achraf Dari
8	DF	MAR	Badr Gaddarine
13	DF	MAR	Ibrahim Najm Eddine
16	DF	MAR	Hamza Asrir
22	DF	MAR	Ayoub El Amloud
23	DF	MAR	Ayoub Moudden
24	DF	MAR	Mohamed Rahim
25	DF	MAR	Youssef Chaina
28	DF	MAR	Abdelatif Noussir (2nd captain)
29	DF	CIV	Cheick Comara
30	DF	MAR	Mohamed Nahiri

No.	Pos.	Nation	Player
–	MF	MAR	Yahia Attiyat allah
4	MF	MAR	Salaheddine Saidi
5	MF	MAR	Yahya Jabrane
6	MF	MAR	Brahim Nekkach (1er captain)
9	MF	NGR	Michael Babatunde
14	MF	MAR	Haytham El Bahja
18	MF	MAR	Walid El Karti
21	MF	MAR	Soufiane Karkache
7	FW	MAR	Zouhair El Moutaraji
9	FW	COD	Kazadi Kasengu
10	FW	CIV	Laurent Magby
11	FW	MAR	Ismail Haddad
17	FW	MAR	Badie Aouk
19	FW	MAR	Amin Tighazoui
20	FW	MAR	Ayman El Hassouni
–	FW	BFA	Mohamed Ouatara
15	FW	UGA	Joel Madondo

== Transfers ==
=== In ===
Date	Pos	Player	From club	Transfer fee	Source
1 July 2019	DF	(Morocco) Brahim Najmeddine	Kawkab Marrakech	Undisclosed	
20 December 2019	GK	(Morocco) Aissa Sioudi	SCC Mohammédia	Undisclosed	
25 December 2019	DF	(Morocco) Youssef Chaina	Youssoufia Berrechid	56,000 €	
25 December 2019	FW	(Democratic Republic of the Congo) Kazadi Kasengu	SCC Mohammédia	170,000 €	
1 January 2020	DF	(Belgium) Soufiane Karkache	RS Berkane	200,000 €	
10 January 2020	FW	(Uganda) Joel Madondo	(Uganda) Hippos FC	Undisclosed	
13 January 2020	DF	(Morocco) Ayoub El Amloud	KAC Kénitra	56,000 €	
15 January 2020	DF	(Morocco) Adil Rhaili	(Qatar) Umm Salal SC	Free transfer	

=== Out ===
Date	Pos	Player	To club	Transfer fee	Source
6 December 2019	FW	(Morocco) Ayoub El Kaabi	Hebei China Fortune	Loan Return	
