= 2019–20 JS Saoura season =

JS Saoura
2019–20 season
- Owner: Entreprise Nationale de Forage
- President: Mohamed Zerouati
- Head coach: Moez Bouakaz (from 2 July 2019) (until 6 August 2019); Moustapha Djallit (from 12 August 2019) (until 13 September 2019); Lyamine Bougherara (from 13 September 2019) (until 24 December 2019); Meziane Ighil (from 2 January 2020)
- Stadium: Stade 20 Août 1955
- Ligue 1: 7th
- Algerian Cup: Round of 32
- Club Championship: First round
- Top goalscorer: League: Sid Ali Yahia-Chérif (4 goals); All: Billel Messaoudi (7 goals)

In the 2019–20 season, JS Saoura competed in the Ligue 1 for the 8th season, as well as the Algerian Cup. On March 15, 2020, the Ligue de Football Professionnel (LFP) decided to halt the season due to the COVID-19 pandemic in Algeria. On July 29, 2020, the LFP declared that season is over and CR Belouizdad to be the champion, the promotion of four teams from the League 2, and scraping the relegation for the current season.

== Squad list ==
Players and squad numbers last updated on 18 November 2010.
Note: Flags indicate national team as has been defined under FIFA eligibility rules. Players may hold more than one non-FIFA nationality.

No.	Nat.	Position	Name	Date of birth (age)	Signed from
Goalkeepers
Defenders
Midfielders
Forwards

== Competitions ==
=== Overview ===
Competition	Record								Started round	Final position / round	First match	Last match
Competition	G	W	D	L	GF	GA	GD	Win %	Started round	Final position / round	First match	Last match
Ligue 1	22	9	6	7	19	18	+1	40.91	—N/a	7th	15 August 2019	15 March 2020
Algerian Cup	2	1	0	1	4	2	+2	50.00	Round of 64	Round of 32	28 December 2019	5 January 2020
Club Champions Cup	5	3	0	2	8	5	+3	60.00	Preliminary round	First round	19 August 2019	1 October 2019
Total	29	13	6	10	31	25	+6	44.83				

Updated to match played 3 June 2019
Source: Competitions

== League table ==
Pos	Team	Pld	W	D	L	GF	GA	GD	Pts	PPG
5	CS Constantine	22	9	7	6	32	23	+9	34	1.55
6	USM Alger	21	9	5	7	25	22	+3	32 (Note: USM Alger were deducted 3 points due to their withdrawal in their game against MC Alger. The decision has been appealed to the Court of Arbitration for Sport. On August 28, 2020, after postponing several times the final decision was made without appeal, which is to return the three points and repeat the match.)	1.52
7	JS Saoura	22	9	6	7	19	18	+1	33	1.50
8	AS Aïn M'lila	22	8	8	6	26	25	+1	32	1.45
9	MC Oran	22	7	9	6	28	24	+4	30	1.36

Updated to match(es) played on 15 March 2020. Source: dzfoot.com
Rules for classification: 1) points; 2) head-to-head points; 3) head-to-head goal difference; 4) goal difference; 5) total goals; 6) fairplay ranking; 7) playoff.

=== Results summary ===
Overall								Home						Away					
Pld	W	D	L	GF	GA	GD	Pts	W	D	L	GF	GA	GD	W	D	L	GF	GA	GD
22	9	6	7	19	18	+1	33	7	2	2	12	5	+7	2	4	5	7	13	−6

Last updated: 15 March 2020.
Source: Competitive matches

=== Results by round ===
Round	1	2	3	4	5	6	7	8	9	10	11	12	13	14	15	16	17	18	19	20	21	22	23	24	25	26	27	28	29	30
Ground																							A	H	A	H	A	H	A	H
Result	W	D	L	W	L	D	W	W	L	W	D	D	L	L	L	D	W	L	W	W	D	W	C	C	C	C	C	C	C	C
Position	3	7	9	6	7	7	4	3	5	5	4	5	7	8	11	11	8	11	7	7	7	6	7	7	7	7	7	7	7	7

Updated to match(es) played on 15 March 2020. Source: Competitive matches
A = Away; H = Home; W = Win; D = Draw; L = Loss

=== Matches ===
Win Draw Loss

15 August 2019 Round 1	JS Saoura	1–0	CS Constantine	Béchar
20:00	Yahia-Chérif 50'	Soccerway report		Stadium: Stade 20 Août 1955; Referee: Nabil Boukhalfa

31 August 2019 Round 3	JS Saoura	0–1	MC Alger	Béchar
20:30		Soccerway report	Belkheir 61'	Stadium: Stade 20 Août 1955; Referee: Yazid Ibrir

16 September 2019 Round 2	AS Ain M'lila	0–0	JS Saoura	Aïn M'lila
16:00		Soccerway report		Stadium: Touhami Zoubir Khelifi Stadium; Referee: Lyés Bekouassa

6 October 2019 Round 7	CA Bordj Bou Arreridj	1–2	JS Saoura	Bordj Bou Arréridj
17:00	Benayad 2'	Soccerway report	Boubekeur 4'; Messaoudi 72'	Stadium: August 20, 1955 Stadium; Referee: Nabil Boukhalfa

12 October 2019 Round 4	JS Saoura	1–0	Paradou AC	Béchar
19:00	Saâd 87'	Soccerway report		Stadium: Stade 20 Août 1955; Referee: Mustapha Ghorbal

23 October 2019 Round 8	JS Saoura	3–0	NC Magra	Béchar
19:00	Khoualed 25'; Zaidi 45+3'; Elmammeri 64'	Soccerway report		Stadium: Stade 20 Août 1955; Referee: Hamza Boucetta

30 October 2019 Round 9	NA Hussein Dey	1–0	JS Saoura	Dar El Beïda
15:00	Belaïd 48'	Soccerway report		Stadium: Omar Benrabah Stadium; Referee: Mehdi Abid Charef

4 November 2019 Round 5	USM Alger	4–1	JS Saoura	Bologhine
17:45	Meftah 13' (pen.); Mahious 74'; Ellafi 88' (pen.); Zouari 90'	Soccerway report	Hamidi 18'	Stadium: Omar Hamadi Stadium; Referee: Mohamed Saïdi

9 November 2019 Round 10	JS Saoura	2–1	US Biskra	Béchar
18:00	Hammia 57', 65' (pen.)	Soccerway report	Messadia 7'	Stadium: Stade 20 Août 1955; Referee: Farouk Mial

16 November 2019 Round 6	JS Saoura	1–1	MC Oran	Béchar
18:00	Hammia 42'	Soccerway report	Fourloul 29'	Stadium: Stade 20 Août 1955; Referee: Youcef Gamouh

23 November 2019 Round 11	JS Kabylie	0–0	JS Saoura	Tizi Ouzou
16:00		Soccerway report		Stadium: Stade 1er Novembre 1954; Attendance: 0 (close doors); Referee: Abderrezzak Arab

30 November 2019 Round 12	JS Saoura	0–0	ASO Chlef	Béchar
18:00		Soccerway report		Stadium: Stade 20 Août 1955; Referee: Redouane Necib

7 December 2019 Round 13	CR Belouizdad	1–0	JS Saoura	Belouizdad
15:00		Soccerway report	Sayoud 39'	Stadium: Stade 20 Août 1955; Referee: Yazid Ibrir

16 December 2019 Round 14	JS Saoura	0–1	USM Bel Abbès	Béchar
17:00		Soccerway report	Metref 79'	Stadium: Stade 20 Août 1955; Referee: Amine Sekhraoui

21 December 2019 Round 15	ES Sétif	2–0	JS Saoura	Sétif
16:00	Ghacha 38'; Touré 42'	Soccerway report		Stadium: Stade 8 Mai 1945; Referee: Lyés Bekouassa

1 February 2020 Round 16	CS Constantine	2–2	JS Saoura	Constantine
16:00	Belkacemi 56', 82'	Soccerway report	Yahia-Chérif 9', 24'	Stadium: Stade Mohamed Hamlaoui; Attendance: 0 (close doors); Referee: Said Aouina

8 February 2020 Round 17	JS Saoura	2–1	AS Aïn M'lila	Béchar
17:00	Farhi 76'; Messaoudi 87'	Soccerway report	Demane 73'	Stadium: Stade 20 Août 1955; Referee: Farouk Mial

15 February 2020 Round 18	MC Alger	1–0	JS Saoura	Bologhine
16:00	Bourdim 42'	Soccerway report		Stadium: Omar Hamadi Stadium; Attendance: 0 (close doors); Referee: Lahlou Benbraham

22 February 2020 Round 19	Paradou AC	0–1	JS Saoura	Bologhine
16:00		Soccerway report	Yahia-Chérif 20'	Stadium: Omar Hamadi Stadium; Referee: Redouane Necib

29 February 2020 Round 20	JS Saoura	1–0	USM Alger	Béchar
18:00	Lahmeri 45+2' (pen.)	Soccerway report		Stadium: Stade 20 Août 1955; Referee: Mustapha Bessiri

7 March 2020 Round 21	MC Oran	1–1	JS Saoura	Oran
16:00	Mansouri 78'	Soccerway report	Saâd 45+3'	Stadium: Ahmed Zabana Stadium; Referee: Lyés Bekouassa

15 March 2020 Round 22	JS Saoura	1–0	CA Bordj Bou Arreridj	Béchar
18:30	Lahmeri 30'	Soccerway report		Stadium: Stade 20 Août 1955; Attendance: 0 (close doors); Referee: Mehdi Abid Charef
Note: due to coronavirus outbreak, Ministry of Health, Population and Hospital Reform decided to be all matches played behind closed doors.

Round 23	NC Magra	Cancelled	JS Saoura	Magra
				Stadium: Boucheligue Brothers Stadium

Round 24	JS Saoura	Cancelled	NA Hussein Dey	Béchar
				Stadium: Stade 20 Août 1955

Round 25	US Biskra	Cancelled	JS Saoura	Biskra
				Stadium: Stade du 18 Février

Round 26	JS Saoura	Cancelled	JS Kabylie	Béchar
				Stadium: Stade 20 Août 1955

Round 27	ASO Chlef	Cancelled	JS Saoura	Chlef
				Stadium: Stade Mohamed Boumezrag

Round 28	JS Saoura	Cancelled	CR Belouizdad	Béchar
				Stadium: Stade 20 Août 1955

Round 29	USM Bel Abbès	Cancelled	JS Saoura	Sidi Bel Abbès
				Stadium: Stade 24 Fevrier 1956

Round 30	JS Saoura	Cancelled	ES Sétif	Béchar
				Stadium: Stade 20 Août 1955

== Algerian Cup ==
28 December 2019 Round of 64	JS Saoura	3–0	DRB Tadjenanet	Béchar
14:00	Hamidi 15' (pen.); Hammia 45+1'; Messaoudi 90'	Report		Stadium: Stade 20 Août 1955; Referee: Bouabdallah, Sarraj, Amrane
Note: Lineup for JS Saoura - Bouziani, Khoualed, Talah, Boubekeur, Kaddour, Khlifi, Bouchiba, Hamidi, Lahmeri, Saâd (Hammar 65’), Hammia (Messaoudi 65’).

5 January 2020 Round of 32	CS Constantine	2–1	JS Saoura	Constantine
16:00	Benayada 41', 77'	Report	Messaoudi 20' (pen.)	Stadium: Stade Mohamed Hamlaoui; Referee: Lahlou Benbraham
Note: Lineup for JS Saoura - Bouziani, Kasim, Boubekeur, Kaddour, Khoualed, Khlifi, Bouchiba, Messaoudi, Yahia-Chérif (Hammar 80’), Saâd, Lahmeri

== Club Championship Cup ==
=== Preliminary round ===
==== Group B ====
Pos	Team	Pld	W	D	L	GF	GA	GD	Pts	Qualification
1	(Algeria) JS Saoura	3	3	0	0	7	0	+7	9	Advance to First round
2	(Tunisia) CA Bizertin	3	2	0	1	10	1	+9	6	
3	ASAS Djibouti Télécom	3	1	0	2	3	6	−3	3	
4	(Comoros) Fomboni	3	0	0	3	2	15	−13	0	

Updated to match(es) played on 25 August 2019. Source: Goalzz
Rules for classification: 1) Points; 2) Goal difference; 3) Goals scored.

19 August 2019 Round 1	JS Saoura (Algeria)	5–0	(Comoros) Volcan Club	Berrechid
21:00	Messaoudi 40', 44', 63'; Meddahi 72'; Hammia 85'	Report		Stadium: Stade Municipal de Berrechid; Referee: Ahmed Faisal Al-Ali (Jordan)
Note: Lineup for JS Saoura -

22 August 2019 Round 2	JS Saoura (Algeria)	1–0	ASAS Djibouti Télécom	Berrechid
18:00	Talah 90'	report		Stadium: Stade Municipal de Berrechid; Referee: Samir Guezzaz (Morocco)
Note: Lineup for JS Saoura - Bouziani - Kaddour, Khoualed (c), Aid, Talah - Farhi, Hamidi, Semahi - El Mammeri, Zaidi, Hammia

25 August 2019 Round 3	CA Bizertin (Tunisia)	0–1	(Algeria) JS Saoura	Berrechid
19:00			Khoualed 90'	Stadium: Stade Municipal de Berrechid; Referee: Amin Mohamed Omar (Egypt)
Note: Lineup for JS Saoura - Saidi - Kaddour, Khoualed, Boubekeur, Meddahi - Bouchiba, Merbah M., Beldjilali - Lahmeri, Yahia Cherif (c), Messaoudi

=== First round ===
23 September 2019 First leg	JS Saoura (Algeria)	1–3	(Saudi Arabia) Al-Shabab	Béchar
20:00 UTC+1	Yahia-Chérif 14'	Report	Sebá 62'; Al-Hamdan 66'; Asprilla 68'	Stadium: Stade 20 Août 1955; Referee: Ali Sabah (Iraq)
Note: Lineup for JS Saoura - Haouli - Meddahi (Daouadji 85'), Khoualed, Boubekeur, Saâd (Toumi 62') - Bouchiba, Farhi (Messaoudi 69'), Kaddour - Hammia, Yahia Cherif (c), Semahi

1 October 2019 Second leg	Al-Shabab (Saudi Arabia)	2–0	(Algeria) JS Saoura	Riyadh
19:45 UTC+3	Al-Hamdan 71'; Al-Sahlawi 84'	Report		Stadium: Prince Faisal bin Fahd Stadium; Referee: Qasim Al-Hatmi (Oman)
Note: Lineup for JS Saoura - Haouli - Kaddour, Khoualed, Boubekeur, Talah, Bouchiba, Semahi (Daouadji 77'), Hamidi (Farhi 62') - Hammia (Toumi 84'), Yahia Cherif (c), Zaidi.

== Squad information ==
=== Playing statistics ===
No.	Pos	Nat	Player	Total		Ligue 1		Algerian Cup		Club Championship	
No.	Pos	Nat	Player	Apps	Goals	Apps	Goals	Apps	Goals	Apps	Goals
Goalkeepers
16	GK	(Algeria) ALG	Mohamed Zakaria Haouli	4	0	2	0	0	0	2	0
	GK	(Algeria) ALG	Zakaria Bouziani	2	0	0	0	2	0	0	0
	GK	(Algeria) ALG	Zakaria Saidi	20	0	20	0	0	0	0	0
Defenders
2	DF	(Algeria) ALG	Mohamed El Amine Barka	0	0	0	0	0	0	0	0
12	DF	(Algeria) ALG	Walid Salma	0	0	0	0	0	0	0	0
15	DF	(Algeria) ALG	Fateh Talah	12	0	10	0	1	0	1	0
20	DF	(Algeria) ALG	Nacereddine Khoualed	20	1	16	1	2	0	2	0
25	DF	(Algeria) ALG	Adel Bouchiba	25	0	21	0	2	0	2	0
	DF	(Algeria) ALG	Oussama Meddahi	21	0	20	0	0	0	1	0
	DF	(Algeria) ALG	Oussama Kaddour	20	0	16	0	2	0	2	0
	DF	(Algeria) ALG	Mehdi Kaiouz	0	0	0	0	0	0	0	0
	DF	(Algeria) ALG	Mohamed Achref Aib	7	1	7	1	0	0	0	0
	DF	(Algeria) ALG	Riyane Akacem	2	0	1	0	1	0	0	0
	DF	(Algeria) ALG	Brahim Salah Eddine Bernou	2	0	2	0	0	0	0	0
Midfielders
7	MF	(Algeria) ALG	Abdeldjalil Taki Eddine Saâd	13	1	10	1	2	0	1	0
9	MF	(Algeria) ALG	Ziri Hammar	10	0	8	0	2	0	0	0
22	MF	(Algeria) ALG	Imadeddine Boubekeur	24	1	20	1	2	0	2	0
26	MF	(Algeria) ALG	Mohamed El Amine Hammia	17	4	14	3	1	1	2	0
27	MF	(Algeria) ALG	Ibrahim Farhi	13	1	12	1	0	0	1	0
	MF	(Algeria) ALG	Khalil Semahi	13	0	11	0	0	0	2	0
	MF	(Algeria) ALG	Belaid Hamidi	17	2	15	1	2	1	0	0
	MF	(Algeria) ALG	Djelloul Daouadji	2	0	0	0	0	0	2	0
	MF	(Algeria) ALG	Hamza Yadroudj	7	0	7	0	0	0	0	0
	MF	(Algeria) ALG	Abderrazak Khelifi	13	0	11	0	2	0	0	0
Forwards
8	FW	(Algeria) ALG	Sid Ali Yahia-Chérif	18	5	15	4	1	0	2	1
14	FW	(Algeria) ALG	Rafik Boukbouka	0	0	0	0	0	0	0	0
19	FW	(Algeria) ALG	Hamza Zaidi	15	1	14	1	0	0	1	0
23	FW	(Tanzania) TAN	Thomas Ulimwengu	0	0	0	0	0	0	0	0
28	FW	(Algeria) ALG	Aimen Lahmeri	16	2	14	2	2	0	0	0
	FW	(Algeria) ALG	Mohamed Toumi Sief	2	0	0	0	0	0	2	0
	FW	(Algeria) ALG	Billel Messaoudi	22	4	19	2	2	2	1	0
Players transferred out during the season
18	DF	(Algeria) ALG	Messala Merbah	2	0	2	0	0	0	0	0
10	MF	(Algeria) ALG	Kaddour Beldjilali	12	0	12	0	0	0	0	0
	FW	(Algeria) ALG	Abdellah Daouadji	2	0	2	0	0	0	0	0
	FW	(Algeria) ALG	Mohamed Toumi	2	0	2	0	0	0	0	0
	FW	(Algeria) ALG	Billel Elmammeri	6	2	6	2	0	0	0	0

Last updated: 9 June 2019

=== Goalscorers ===
Includes all competitive matches. The list is sorted alphabetically by surname when total goals are equal.

No.	Nat.	Player	Pos.	L 1	AC	CC 4	TOTAL
	(Algeria)	Billel Messaoudi	FW	2	2	3	7
8	(Algeria)	Sid Ali Yahia-Chérif	FW	4	0	1	5
26	(Algeria)	Mohamed El Amine Hammia	MF	3	1	1	5
	(Algeria)	Belaid Hamidi	MF	1	1	0	2
20	(Algeria)	Nacereddine Khoualed	DF	1	0	1	2
28	(Algeria)	Aimen Lahmeri	FW	2	0	0	2
	(Algeria)	Billel Elmammeri	FW	2	0	0	2
	(Algeria)	Oussama Meddahi	DF	0	0	1	1
15	(Algeria)	Fateh Talah	DF	0	0	1	1
	(Algeria)	Mohamed Achref Aib	DF	1	0	0	1
7	(Algeria)	Abdeldjalil Taki Eddine Saâd	MF	1	0	0	1
27	(Algeria)	Ibrahim Farhi	MF	1	0	0	1
19	(Algeria)	Hamza Zaidi	FW	1	0	0	1
Own Goals				0	0	0	0
Totals				19	4	8	31

== Squad list ==
As of 15 August 2019. Note: Flags indicate national team as defined under FIFA eligibility rules; some limited exceptions apply. Players may hold more than one non-FIFA nationality.

No.	Pos.	Nation	Player
1	GK	ALG	Zakaria Saidi
4	DF	ALG	Achref Aïb
6	DF	ALG	Brahim Salah Eddine Bernou
7	MF	ALG	Abdeldjalil Taki Eddine Saâd
8	FW	ALG	Sid Ali Yahia-Chérif (captain)
9	MF	ALG	Ziri Hammar
10	MF	ALG	Kaddour Beldjilali
11	FW	ALG	Seif Zine Toumi
12	DF	ALG	Oussama Kaddour
13	MF	ALG	Khalil Semahi
14	DF	ALG	Oussama Meddahi
15	DF	ALG	Fateh Talah
16	GK	ALG	Zakaria Haouli
17	FW	ALG	Billel El Mammeri

No.	Pos.	Nation	Player
18	DF	ALG	Messala Merbah
19	FW	ALG	Hamza Zaidi
20	DF	ALG	Nacereddine Khoualed
21	MF	ALG	Belaid Hamidi
22	MF	ALG	Imadeddine Boubekeur
23	FW	TAN	Thomas Ulimwengu
24	MF	ALG	Djelloul Daouadji
25	DF	ALG	Adel Bouchiba
26	MF	ALG	Mohamed El Amine Hammia
27	MF	ALG	Ibrahim Farhi Benhalima
28	FW	ALG	Aimen Lahmeri
29	FW	ALG	Billel Messaoudi
30	GK	ALG	Zakaria Bouziani

== Transfers ==
=== In ===
Date	Pos	Player	from club	Transfer fee	Source
7 June 2019	MF	(Algeria) Khalil Semahi	MO Béjaïa	Free transfer	
9 June 2019	MF	(Algeria) Oussama Medahi	DRB Tadjenanet	Free transfer	
27 June 2019	MF	(Algeria) Kaddour Beldjilali	CS Constantine	Free transfer	

=== Out ===
Date	Pos	Player	to club	Transfer fee	Source
30 June 2019	FW	(Algeria) Moustapha Djallit	Retired	—N/a	
13 July 2019	DF	(Algeria) Mohamed Tiboutine	USM Alger	Free transfer	
15 July 2019	GK	(Algeria) Abderaouf Natèche	(Saudi Arabia) Ohod	Free transfer	
22 July 2019	FW	(Algeria) Mohamed Boulaouidet	(Sudan) Al-Hilal Club	Free transfer	
26 July 2019	DF	(Algeria) Ibrahim Bekakchi	ES Sétif	Free transfer	
1 August 2019	DF	(Senegal) El Hadji Youssoupha Konaté	(Morocco) IR Tanger	Free transfer	
20 January 2020	MF	(Algeria) Kaddour Beldjilali	ASO Chlef	Free transfer	
21 January 2020	MF	(Algeria) Abdellah Daouadji	CA Bordj Bou Arreridj	Free transfer	
