= 2019–20 Arab Club Champions Cup preliminary round =

The 2019–20 Arab Club Champions Cup preliminary round began on 18 August and ended on 25 August 2019.

A total of 8 teams competed in the preliminary round of the 2019–20 Arab Club Champions Cup to decide the 2 remaining places in the first knockout stage.

All times are WAT (UTC+1), as listed by UAFA.

== Teams ==
The draw for the preliminary round was held on 27 July 2019, shortly before the first round draw.

Group	Group A	Group B
Teams	(Iraq) Al-Zawraa; (Somalia) Horseed; (Morocco) Ittihad Tanger; (Bahrain) Al-Riffa	(Tunisia) CA Bizertin; ASAS Djibouti Télécom; (Comoros) Fomboni; (Algeria) JS Saoura

== Officials ==
Referees

- Samir Guezzaz (Morocco)
- Saad Khalefah (Kuwait)
- Amin Omar (Egypt)
- Qassim Al-Hatmi (Oman)
- Ammar Mahfoodh (Bahrain)
- Ahmed Faisal Al-Ali (Jordan)
- Feras Taweel (Syria)
- (Saudi Arabia) Majed Al-Shamrani (Saudi Arabia)
- (United Arab Emirates) Hamad Al-Ali (United Arab Emirates)
- (United Arab Emirates) Adel Ali Al-Naqbi (United Arab Emirates)

Assistant Referees

- Mustapha Akerdad (Morocco)
- Humoud Al Sahli (Kuwait)
- Samir Gamal Saad Mohamed (Egypt)
- Abdullah Al-Shammakhi (Oman)
- Salah Al-Janahi (Bahrain)
- Abd Alsalam Halawah (Palestine)
- (Saudi Arabia) Omar Ali Al Jamal (Saudi Arabia)
- (Saudi Arabia) Hesham Al-Refaei (Saudi Arabia)
- (United Arab Emirates) Jasem Al Ali (United Arab Emirates)
- Ali Al-Hasani (Yemen)

== Format ==
In each group, teams played against each other on a neutral ground. The group winners advanced to the first knockout stage.

=== Tiebreakers ===
Teams are ranked according to points (3 points for a win, 1 point for a draw, 0 points for a loss), and if tied on points, the following tiebreaking criteria are applied, in the order given, to determine the rankings:

1. Goal difference in all group matches;
2. Goals scored in all group matches.

== Summary ==
=== Group A ===
Pos	Team	Pld	W	D	L	GF	GA	GD	Pts	Qualification	RSC	IRT	ZSC	HOR
1	(Bahrain) Al-Riffa	3	3	0	0	8	0	+8	9	Advance to First round	—			5–0
2	(Morocco) Ittihad Tanger	3	2	0	1	9	3	+6	6		0–2	—	3–0	
3	(Iraq) Al-Zawraa	3	1	0	2	2	4	−2	3		0–1		—	2–0
4	(Somalia) Horseed	3	0	0	3	1	13	−12	0			1–6		—

Updated to match(es) played on 24 August 2019. Source: Goalzz
Rules for classification: 1) Points; 2) Goal difference; 3) Goals scored.
18 August 2019
18:00

Al-Zawraa (Iraq)	2–0	(Somalia) Horseed
Abbas 62'; Abdulameer 74'	Report

Stade Mohammed V, Casablanca
Referee: Qassim Al-Hatmi (Oman)
18 August 2019
21:00

Ittihad Tanger (Morocco)	0–2	(Bahrain) Al-Riffa
	Report	Al Aswad 71'; Isa 79'

Stade Mohammed V, Casablanca
Referee: Adel Ali Al-Naqbi (United Arab Emirates)

21 August 2019
18:00

Al-Riffa (Bahrain)	5–0	(Somalia) Horseed
Al Aswad 44' (pen.), 56', 66' (pen.); Isa 47'; Abduljabbar 76'	Report

Stade Mohammed V, Casablanca
Referee: Feras Taweel (Syria)
21 August 2019
21:00

Ittihad Tanger (Morocco)	3–0	(Iraq) Al-Zawraa
Echaraf 26'; El Amrawy 28'; Said 60' (pen.)	Report

Stade Mohammed V, Casablanca
Referee: Amin Omar (Egypt)

24 August 2019
19:00

Horseed (Somalia)	1–6	(Morocco) Ittihad Tanger
Abed Al Kader 48'	Report	Ed-dyb 9', 17' (pen.); Aarab 34'; Anouar 43', 45'; Chentouf 75'

Stade El Abdi, El Jadida
Referee: Hamad Al-Ali (United Arab Emirates)
24 August 2019
19:00

Al-Zawraa (Iraq)	0–1	(Bahrain) Al-Riffa
	Report	Abduljabbar 83'

Stade Municipal de Berrechid, Berrechid
Referee: Adel Ali Al-Naqbi (United Arab Emirates)

=== Group B ===
Pos	Team	Pld	W	D	L	GF	GA	GD	Pts	Qualification	JSS	CAB	TEL	FOM
1	(Algeria) JS Saoura	3	3	0	0	7	0	+7	9	Advance to First round	—		1–0	
2	(Tunisia) CA Bizertin	3	2	0	1	10	1	+9	6		0–1	—	3–0	
3	ASAS Djibouti Télécom	3	1	0	2	3	6	−3	3				—	3–2
4	(Comoros) Fomboni	3	0	0	3	2	15	−13	0		0–5	0–7		—

Updated to match(es) played on 25 August 2019. Source: Goalzz
Rules for classification: 1) Points; 2) Goal difference; 3) Goals scored.
19 August 2019
18:00

CA Bizertin (Tunisia)	3–0	ASAS Djibouti Télécom
Habbessi 31'; Sahraoui 69'; Dridi 78'	Report

Stade Municipal de Berrechid, Berrechid
Referee: Majed Al-Shamrani (Saudi Arabia)
19 August 2019
21:00

Fomboni (Comoros)	0–5	(Algeria) JS Saoura
	Report	Messaoudi 38', 44', 64'; Meddahi 73'; Hammia 89'

Stade Municipal de Berrechid, Berrechid
Referee: Ahmed Faisal Al-Ali (Jordan)

22 August 2019
18:00

JS Saoura (Algeria)	1–0	ASAS Djibouti Télécom
Talah 90+1'	Report

Stade Municipal de Berrechid, Berrechid
Referee: Samir Guezzaz (Morocco)
22 August 2019
21:00

Fomboni (Comoros)	0–7	(Tunisia) CA Bizertin
	Report	Jendoubi 4', 32'; Sahraoui 6'; Chettal 11'; Habbessi 14', 35'; Ounalli 28'

Stade Municipal de Berrechid, Berrechid
Referee: Ammar Mahfoodh (Bahrain)

25 August 2019
19:00

ASAS Djibouti Télécom	3–2	(Comoros) Fomboni
Odutola 25' (pen.); Mahabeh 31', 43'	Report	Othmani 78'; Islam 90+3'

Stade El Abdi, El Jadida
Referee: Saad Khalefah (Kuwait)
25 August 2019
19:00

CA Bizertin (Tunisia)	0–1	(Algeria) JS Saoura
	Report	Khoualed 90'

Stade Municipal de Berrechid, Berrechid
Referee: Amin Omar (Egypt)
