= 2019–20 Arab Club Champions Cup knockout stage =

Arab football contest

The 2019–20 Arab Club Champions Cup knockout stage began on 20 August 2019 and ended on 21 August 2021 with the final at the Prince Moulay Abdellah Stadium in Rabat, Morocco, to decide the champions of the 2019–20 Arab Club Champions Cup. A total of 32 teams competed in the knockout stage.

== Round and draw dates ==
The schedule is as follows. The tournament was postponed for ten months in 2020 due to the COVID-19 pandemic.

Round	Draw date	First leg	Second leg
Preliminary round	27 July 2019	18–25 August 2019	
First round	27 July 2019	20 August – 24 September 2019	30 August – 3 October 2019
Second round	5 October 2019	23 October – 8 November 2019	4 November – 16 December 2019
Quarter-finals	4 December 2019	23 December 2019 – 15 January 2020	20 January – 15 February 2020
Semi-finals	4 December 2019	16 February – 2 December 2020	4 January – 11 January 2021
Final	4 December 2019	21 August 2021 at Prince Moulay Abdellah Stadium, Rabat	

== Format ==
Each tie in the knockout stage, apart from the final, is played over two legs, with each team playing one leg at home. The team that scores more goals on aggregate over the two legs advances to the next round. If the aggregate score is level, the away goals rule is applied, i.e. the team that scores more goals away from home over the two legs advances. If away goals are also equal, extra time will not be played and the winners are decided by a penalty shoot-out.

== Qualified teams ==
The knockout stage involves 32 teams: the 30 teams which enter the competition from this stage, and the two teams which qualify from the preliminary round.

Teams were seeded based on their association rank in their respective region.

Pot	Pot 1	Pot 2
Teams	(Algeria) CS Constantine; (Algeria) MC Alger; (Egypt) Ismaily; (Egypt) Al-Ittihad Alexandria; (Iraq) Al-Quwa Al-Jawiya; (Iraq) Al-Shorta; (Morocco) Olympic Safi; (Morocco) Raja Casablanca; (Morocco) Wydad Casablanca; (Saudi Arabia) Al-Shabab; (Saudi Arabia) Al-Ittihad Jeddah; (Syria) Al-Jaish; (Tunisia) Espérance de Tunis; (Tunisia) Étoile du Sahel; (United Arab Emirates) Al-Jazira; (United Arab Emirates) Al-Wasl	(Algeria) JS Saoura (Note: The advancing teams from the qualifying round were listed as Qualifier A (Al-Riffa) and Qualifier B (JS Saoura) at the time of the first round draw as the identity of the teams had not been confirmed.); (Bahrain) Al-Muharraq; (Bahrain) Al-Riffa; (Jordan) Shabab Al-Ordon; (Kuwait) Al-Arabi; Al-Kuwait; (Kuwait) Al-Salmiya; (Lebanon) Al-Ahed; (Lebanon) Nejmeh; (Libya) Al-Ahly Benghazi; (Mauritania) FC Nouadhibou; (Oman) Dhofar; (Oman) Al-Nasr; (Palestine) Hilal Al-Quds; (Sudan) Al-Hilal; (Sudan) Al-Merrikh

== Bracket ==
First round
(Algeria) JS Saoura	1	0	1
(Saudi Arabia) Al-Shabab	3	2	5
(Jordan) Shabab Al-Ordon	2	1	3
(Tunisia) Étoile du Sahel	1	0	1
(Syria) Al-Jaish	1	0	1
(Mauritania) FC Nouadhibou	1	1	2
Al-Kuwait	3	0	3
(Iraq) Al-Shorta (a)	1	2	3
(United Arab Emirates) Al-Wasl	2	1	3
(Sudan) Al-Hilal	0	2	2
(Saudi Arabia) Al-Ittihad Jeddah	3	0	3
(Lebanon) Al-Ahed	0	0	0
(Morocco) Olympic Safi	1	1	2
(Bahrain) Al-Riffa	1	0	1
(Lebanon) Nejmeh	1	0	1
(Tunisia) Espérance de Tunis	1	2	3
(Kuwait) Al-Arabi	0	0	0
(Egypt) Al-Ittihad Alexandria	1	2	3
(Algeria) CS Constantine	3	0	3
(Bahrain) Al-Muharraq (a)	1	2	3
(Egypt) Ismaily	4	0	4
(Libya) Al-Ahly Benghazi	2	1	3
(Oman) Al-Nasr	0	1	1
(United Arab Emirates) Al-Jazira	1	3	4
(Iraq) Al-Quwa Al-Jawiya	3	1	4
(Kuwait) Al-Salmiya	1	1	2
(Algeria) MC Alger	1	1	2
(Oman) Dhofar	0	1	1
(Morocco) Raja Casablanca	1	2	3
(Palestine) Hilal Al-Quds	0	0	0
(Sudan) Al-Merrikh	1	0	1
(Morocco) Wydad Casablanca	1	2	3

Second round
(Saudi Arabia) Al-Shabab	1	1	2
(Jordan) Shabab Al-Ordon	0	1	1
(Mauritania) FC Nouadhibou	0	0	0
(Iraq) Al-Shorta	1	5	6
(United Arab Emirates) Al-Wasl	1	0	1
(Saudi Arabia) Al-Ittihad Jeddah	2	2	4
(Morocco) Olympic Safi (p)	1	1	2 (4)
(Tunisia) Espérance de Tunis	1	1	2 (2)
(Egypt) Al-Ittihad Alexandria	2	1	3
(Bahrain) Al-Muharraq	0	0	0
(Egypt) Ismaily	2	2	4
(United Arab Emirates) Al-Jazira	0	0	0
(Iraq) Al-Quwa Al-Jawiya	0	0	0 (2)
(Algeria) MC Alger (p)	0	0	0 (4)
(Morocco) Raja Casablanca (a)	1	4	5
(Morocco) Wydad Casablanca	1	4	5

Quarter-finals
(Saudi Arabia) Al-Shabab	6	1	7
(Iraq) Al-Shorta	0	0	0
(Saudi Arabia) Al-Ittihad Jeddah	1	1	2
(Morocco) Olympic Safi	1	0	1
(Egypt) Al-Ittihad Alexandria	0	0	0
(Egypt) Ismaily	1	0	1
(Algeria) MC Alger	1	1	2
(Morocco) Raja Casablanca (a)	2	0	2

Semi-finals
(Saudi Arabia) Al-Shabab	2	1	3
(Saudi Arabia) Al-Ittihad Jeddah	2	2	4
(Egypt) Ismaily	1	0	1
(Morocco) Raja Casablanca	0	3	3

Final
(Saudi Arabia) Al-Ittihad Jeddah	4 (3)
(Morocco) Raja Casablanca (p)	4 (4)

== First round ==
=== Summary ===
Team 1	Agg.	Team 2	1st leg	2nd leg
Al-Quwa Al-Jawiya (Iraq)	4–2	(Kuwait) Al-Salmiya	3–1	1–1
Shabab Al-Ordon (Jordan)	3–1	(Tunisia) Étoile du Sahel	2–1	1–0
Al-Jaish (Syria)	1–2	(Mauritania) FC Nouadhibou	1–1	0–1
Al-Merrikh (Sudan)	1–3	(Morocco) Wydad Casablanca	1–1	0–2
Ismaily (Egypt)	4–3	(Libya) Al-Ahly Benghazi	4–2	0–1
Al-Nasr (Oman)	1–4	(United Arab Emirates) Al-Jazira	0–1	1–3
Al-Wasl (United Arab Emirates)	3–2	(Sudan) Al-Hilal	2–0	1–2
Al-Arabi (Kuwait)	0–3	(Egypt) Al-Ittihad Alexandria	0–1	0–2
Olympic Safi (Morocco)	2–1	(Bahrain) Al-Riffa	1–1	1–0
Nejmeh (Lebanon)	1–3	(Tunisia) Espérance de Tunis	1–1	0–2
MC Alger (Algeria)	2–1	(Oman) Dhofar	1–0	1–1
Al-Kuwait	3–3 (a)	(Iraq) Al-Shorta	3–1	0–2
Raja Casablanca (Morocco)	3–0	(Palestine) Hilal Al-Quds	1–0	2–0
JS Saoura (Algeria)	1–5	(Saudi Arabia) Al-Shabab	1–3	0–2
CS Constantine (Algeria)	3–3 (a)	(Bahrain) Al-Muharraq	3–1	0–2
Al-Ittihad Jeddah (Saudi Arabia)	3–0 (Note: Order of legs reversed after original draw.)	(Lebanon) Al-Ahed	3–0	0–0

=== Matches ===
29 August 2019
19:00 UTC+3

Al-Quwa Al-Jawiya (Iraq)	3–1	(Kuwait) Al-Salmiya
Midani 45'; Bayesh 47'; Jabbar 60'	Report	Neda 8' (pen.)

Karbala International Stadium, Karbala
Referee: Sadok Selmi (Tunisia)
24 September 2019
20:15 UTC+3

Al-Salmiya (Kuwait)	1–1	(Iraq) Al-Quwa Al-Jawiya
Al Faneni 7'	Report	Qasim 51'

Thamir Stadium, Salmiya
Referee: Ali Al Samahiji (Bahrain)

Al-Quwa Al-Jawiya won 4–2 on aggregate.

29 August 2019
19:00 UTC+3

Shabab Al-Ordon (Jordan)	2–1	(Tunisia) Étoile du Sahel
Al-Naber 34'; Mustafa 53'	Report	Jemal 50'

King Abdullah II Stadium, Amman
Referee: Turki Al-Khudair (Saudi Arabia)
24 September 2019
17:00 UTC+1

Étoile du Sahel (Tunisia)	0–1	(Jordan) Shabab Al-Ordon
	Report	Khalid 49'

Stade Mustapha Ben Jannet, Monastir
Referee: Gehad Grisha (Egypt)

Shabab Al-Ordon won 3–1 on aggregate.

1 September 2019
19:00 UTC+3

Al-Jaish (Syria)	1–1	(Mauritania) FC Nouadhibou
Krouma 15'	Report	Al Hamwi 67' (o.g.)

Karbala International Stadium, Karbala (Iraq) (Note: Teams from Syria played their home matches outside the country due to security concerns from the ongoing civil war.)
Referee: Mohanad Qasim Sarray (Iraq)
3 October 2019
17:00 UTC+0

FC Nouadhibou (Mauritania)	1–0	(Syria) Al-Jaish
Sy 19'	Report

Stade Cheikha Ould Boïdiya, Nouakchott
Referee: Adil Zourak (Morocco)

FC Nouadhibou won 2–1 on aggregate.

31 August 2019
20:00 UTC+2

Al-Merrikh (Sudan)	1–1	(Morocco) Wydad Casablanca
El Karti 4' (o.g.)	Report	Nahiri 45+5' (pen.)

Al-Merrikh Stadium, Omdurman
Referee: Adham Makhadmeh (Jordan)
3 October 2019
20:00 UTC+1

Wydad Casablanca (Morocco)	2–0	(Sudan) Al-Merrikh
Saidi 62'; El Amloud 75'	Report

Stade Mohammed V, Casablanca
Referee: Mahmoud El Banna (Egypt)

Wydad Casablanca won 3–1 on aggregate.

13 September 2019
18:00 UTC+2

Ismaily (Egypt)	4–2	(Libya) Al-Ahly Benghazi
Abdel Hakim 4', 21'; Madbouly 33'; A. Magdy 87'	Report	Ben Omran 29'; David 63'

Ismailia Stadium, Ismailia
Referee: Rédouane Jiyed (Morocco)
27 September 2019
16:00 UTC+1

Al-Ahly Benghazi (Libya)	1–0	(Egypt) Ismaily
Bouakila 83'	Report

Stade Mustapha Ben Jannet, Monastir (Tunisia) (Note: Teams from Libya played their home matches outside the country due to security concerns from the ongoing civil war.)
Referee: Haythem Guirat (Tunisia)

Ismaily won 4–3 on aggregate.

14 September 2019
16:15 UTC+4

Al-Nasr (Oman)	0–1	(United Arab Emirates) Al-Jazira
	Report	Al-Ameri 22'

Salalah Sports Complex, Salalah
Referee: Amin Omar (Egypt)
23 September 2019
18:45 UTC+4

Al-Jazira (United Arab Emirates)	3–1	(Oman) Al-Nasr
Al-Ameri 7', 67'; Batna 82'	Report	Khasib 45'

Mohammed bin Zayed Stadium, Abu Dhabi
Referee: Turki Al-Khudair (Saudi Arabia)

Al-Jazira won 4–1 on aggregate.

20 August 2019
19:15 UTC+4

Al-Wasl (United Arab Emirates)	2–0	(Sudan) Al-Hilal
Lima 29'; Saleh 80'	Report

Zabeel Stadium, Dubai
Referee: Ali Sabah (Iraq)
30 August 2019
20:00 UTC+2

Al-Hilal (Sudan)	2–1	(United Arab Emirates) Al-Wasl
Al-Shoala 12', 79'	Report	Lima 87'

Al-Hilal Stadium, Omdurman
Referee: Mehdi Abid Charef (Algeria)

Al-Wasl won 3–2 on aggregate.

26 August 2019
20:15 UTC+3

Al-Arabi (Kuwait)	0–1	(Egypt) Al-Ittihad Alexandria
	Report	Kamar 49' (pen.)

Sabah Al-Salem Stadium, Kuwait City
Referee: Mohammed Al-Hoish (Saudi Arabia)
26 September 2019
19:00 UTC+2

Al-Ittihad Alexandria (Egypt)	2–0	(Kuwait) Al-Arabi
Kamar 17'; Cissé 80'	Report

Borg El Arab Stadium, Alexandria
Referee: Mustapha Ghorbal (Algeria)

Al-Ittihad Alexandria won 3–0 on aggregate.

20 September 2019
19:00 UTC+1

Olympic Safi (Morocco)	1–1	(Bahrain) Al-Riffa
Boua 2'	Report	Naji 73' (o.g.)

Stade El Massira, Safi
Referee: El Fadil Mohamed (Sudan)
1 October 2019
18:30 UTC+3

Al-Riffa (Bahrain)	0–1	(Morocco) Olympic Safi
	Report	Boua 86'

Khalifa Sports City Stadium, Isa Town
Referee: Adham Makhadmeh (Jordan)

Olympic Safi won 2–1 on aggregate.

30 August 2019
19:00 UTC+3

Nejmeh (Lebanon)	1–1	(Tunisia) Espérance de Tunis
Hedhli 69'	Report	Bedrane 90+2'

Camille Chamoun Sports City Stadium, Beirut
Referee: Masoud Tufaylieh (Syria)
2 October 2019
19:00 UTC+1

Espérance de Tunis (Tunisia)	2–0	(Lebanon) Nejmeh
Khenissi 20', 79'	Report

Stade Olympique de Radès, Radès
Referee: Adel Al-Naqbi (United Arab Emirates)

Espérance de Tunis won 3–1 on aggregate.

24 September 2019
20:30 UTC+1

MC Alger (Algeria)	1–0	(Oman) Dhofar
Azzi 59'	Report

Stade du 5 Juillet, Algiers
Referee: Noureddine El Jaafari (Morocco)
30 September 2019
20:30 UTC+4

Dhofar (Oman)	1–1	(Algeria) MC Alger
Al-Muqbali 61'	Report	Nekkache 75'

Salalah Sports Complex, Salalah
Referee: Sultan Al-Marzooqi (United Arab Emirates)

MC Alger won 2–1 on aggregate.

28 August 2019
20:15 UTC+3

Al-Kuwait	3–1	(Iraq) Al-Shorta
Nasser 4' (pen.); Calderón 30'; Zayid 85'	Report	Hussein 45+1'

Al-Kuwait Sports Club Stadium, Kuwait City
Referee: Mahmoud El Banna (Egypt)
23 September 2019
19:00 UTC+3

Al-Shorta (Iraq)	2–0	Al-Kuwait
Mapuku 79', 90+5'	Report

Karbala International Stadium, Karbala
Referee: Youssef Essrayri (Tunisia)

3–3 on aggregate. Al-Shorta won on away goals.

23 September 2019
20:00 UTC+1

Raja Casablanca (Morocco)	1–0	(Palestine) Hilal Al-Quds
Moutouali 12' (pen.)	Report

Stade Mohammed V, Casablanca
Referee: Beida Dahane (Mauritania)
3 October 2019
19:00 UTC+3

Hilal Al-Quds (Palestine)	0–2	(Morocco) Raja Casablanca
	Report	Ngoma 47'; Nanah 82'

Faisal Al-Husseini International Stadium, Al-Ram
Referee: Ahmed Yacoub (Jordan)

Raja Casablanca won 3–0 on aggregate.

23 September 2019
20:00 UTC+1

JS Saoura (Algeria)	1–3	(Saudi Arabia) Al-Shabab
Yahia-Chérif 14'	Report	Sebá 62'; Al-Hamdan 66'; Asprilla 68'

Stade 20 Août 1955, Béchar
Referee: Ali Sabah (Iraq)
1 October 2019
19:45 UTC+3

Al-Shabab (Saudi Arabia)	2–0	(Algeria) JS Saoura
Al-Hamdan 71'; Al-Sahlawi 84'	Report

Prince Faisal bin Fahd Stadium, Riyadh
Referee: Qasim Al-Hatmi (Oman)

Al-Shabab won 5–1 on aggregate.

27 August 2019
20:30 UTC+1

CS Constantine (Algeria)	3–1	(Bahrain) Al-Muharraq
Djabout 39'; Amokrane 85'; Belkacemi 90+4'	Report	Abdullatif 51'

Mohamed Hamlaoui Stadium, Constantine
Referee: Noureddine El Jaafari (Morocco)
17 September 2019
18:00 UTC+3

Al-Muharraq (Bahrain)	2–0	(Algeria) CS Constantine
Tiago 45+5'; Augusto 80'	Report

Sheikh Ali Bin Mohamad Stadium, Muharraq
Referee: Ahmed Yacoub (Jordan)

3–3 on aggregate. Al-Muharraq won on away goals.

20 August 2019
20:45 UTC+3

Al-Ittihad Jeddah (Saudi Arabia)	3–0	(Lebanon) Al-Ahed
Romarinho 14'; Da Costa 28'; Prijović 38'	Report

King Abdullah Sports City, Jeddah
Referee: Ali Al Samahiji (Bahrain)
31 August 2019
19:00 UTC+3

Al-Ahed (Lebanon)	0–0	(Saudi Arabia) Al-Ittihad Jeddah
	Report

Camille Chamoun Sports City Stadium, Beirut
Referee: Gehad Grisha (Egypt)

Al-Ittihad Jeddah won 3–0 on aggregate.

== Second round ==
=== Summary ===
Team 1	Agg.	Team 2	1st leg	2nd leg
Al-Quwa Al-Jawiya (Iraq)	0–0 (2–4 p)	(Algeria) MC Alger	0–0	0–0
Al-Ittihad Alexandria (Egypt)	3–0	(Bahrain) Al-Muharraq	2–0	1–0
Al-Shabab (Saudi Arabia)	2–1	(Jordan) Shabab Al-Ordon	1–0	1–1
Raja Casablanca (Morocco)	5–5 (a)	(Morocco) Wydad Casablanca	1–1	4–4
FC Nouadhibou (Mauritania)	0–6	(Iraq) Al-Shorta	0–1	0–5
Ismaily (Egypt)	4–0	(United Arab Emirates) Al-Jazira	2–0	2–0
Olympic Safi (Morocco)	2–2 (4–2 p)	(Tunisia) Espérance de Tunis	1–1	1–1
Al-Wasl (United Arab Emirates)	1–4	(Saudi Arabia) Al-Ittihad Jeddah	1–2	0–2

=== Matches ===
8 November 2019
16:00 UTC+3

Al-Quwa Al-Jawiya (Iraq)	0–0	(Algeria) MC Alger
	Report

Franso Hariri Stadium, Erbil
Referee: Masoud Tufaylieh (Syria)
16 December 2019 (Note: The second leg fixture between MC Alger and Al-Quwa Al-Jawiya, originally scheduled to be played on 24 November 2019, was postponed following issues concerning the travels of Al-Quwa Al-Jawiya due to security concerns from the 2019–20 Iraqi protests. The UAFA later announced that the match would take place on 16 December 2019.)
20:00 UTC+1

MC Alger (Algeria)	0–0	(Iraq) Al-Quwa Al-Jawiya
	Report
Penalties
Lamara (penalty scored); Frioui (penalty scored); Ouertani (penalty scored); Bendebka (penalty scored)	4–2	(penalty missed) Abboud; (penalty scored) Bayesh; (penalty scored) Nsayef; (penalty missed) Karrar

Mustapha Tchaker Stadium, Blida
Referee: Mohammed Al-Hoish (Saudi Arabia)

0–0 on aggregate. MC Alger won 4–2 on penalties.

3 November 2019
20:00 UTC+2

Al-Ittihad Alexandria (Egypt)	2–0	(Bahrain) Al-Muharraq
Refaat 45+2' (pen.); Kamar 66'	Report

Alexandria Stadium, Alexandria
Referee: Mohanad Qasim Sarray (Iraq)
24 November 2019
18:30 UTC+3

Al-Muharraq (Bahrain)	0–1	(Egypt) Al-Ittihad Alexandria
	Report	Kamar 73'

Sheikh Ali Bin Mohamad Stadium, Muharraq
Referee: Lahlou Benbraham (Algeria)

Al-Ittihad Alexandria won 3–0 on aggregate.

28 October 2019
19:15 UTC+3

Al-Shabab (Saudi Arabia)	1–0	(Jordan) Shabab Al-Ordon
Muath 90'	Report

Prince Faisal bin Fahd Stadium, Riyadh
Referee: Ali Al Samahiji (Bahrain)
8 November 2019
17:30 UTC+2

Shabab Al-Ordon (Jordan)	1–1	(Saudi Arabia) Al-Shabab
Gamal 78'	Report	Benlamri 86'

King Abdullah II Stadium, Amman
Referee: Mehdi Abid Charef (Algeria)

Al-Shabab won 2–1 on aggregate.

2 November 2019
19:00 UTC+1

Raja Casablanca (Morocco)	1–1	(Morocco) Wydad Casablanca
Ngoma 48'	Report	El Haddad 33'

Stade Mohammed V, Casablanca
Referee: Mohammed Abdulla Hassan Mohamed (United Arab Emirates)
23 November 2019
20:00 UTC+1

Wydad Casablanca (Morocco)	4–4	(Morocco) Raja Casablanca
Nahiri 13' (pen.); El Hassouni 56'; El Kaabi 58'; Aouk 71'	Report	Moutouali 50' (pen.), 89' (pen.); Ahaddad 74'; Malango 90+4'

Stade Mohammed V, Casablanca
Referee: Mahmoud El Banna (Egypt)

5–5 on aggregate. Raja Casablanca won on away goals.

6 November 2019
17:00 UTC+0

FC Nouadhibou (Mauritania)	0–1	(Iraq) Al-Shorta
	Report	Abdul-Zahra 56'

Stade Cheikha Ould Boïdiya, Nouakchott
Referee: Mustapha Ghorbal (Algeria)
25 November 2019
19:00 UTC+3

Al-Shorta (Iraq)	5–0	(Mauritania) FC Nouadhibou
Attwan 8', 34', 38'; Sabah 12', 50'	Report

Al Khor SC Stadium, Al Khor (Qatar) (Note: The second leg fixture between Al-Shorta and FC Nouadhibou, originally scheduled to be played at the Karbala International Stadium in Karbala, Iraq, was played at Al Khor SC Stadium in Al Khor, Qatar due to security concerns from the 2019–20 Iraqi protests.)
Referee: El Fadil Mohamed (Sudan)

Al-Shorta won 6–0 on aggregate.

23 October 2019
19:00 UTC+2

Ismaily (Egypt)	2–0	(United Arab Emirates) Al-Jazira
Shilongo 40', 64'	Report

Ismailia Stadium, Ismailia
Referee: Noureddine El Jaafari (Morocco)
26 November 2019
18:00 UTC+4

Al-Jazira (United Arab Emirates)	0–2	(Egypt) Ismaily
	Report	Tariq 87'; Morsy 90+3'

Mohammed bin Zayed Stadium, Abu Dhabi
Referee: Rédouane Jiyed (Morocco)

Ismaily won 4–0 on aggregate.

3 November 2019
19:00 UTC+1

Olympic Safi (Morocco)	1–1	(Tunisia) Espérance de Tunis
El Morabit 85'	Report	El Houni 33'

Stade El Massira, Safi
Referee: Ali Sabah (Iraq)
23 November 2019
18:00 UTC+1

Espérance de Tunis (Tunisia)	1–1	(Morocco) Olympic Safi
Bonsu 52'	Report	Mouaoui 20'
Penalties
Badri (penalty scored); Bonsu (penalty scored); Rabii (penalty missed); Jouini (penalty missed)	2–4	(penalty scored) El Morabit; (penalty scored) Sabbar; (penalty scored) Lahlali; (penalty scored) Khaba

Stade Olympique de Radès, Radès
Referee: Gehad Grisha (Egypt)

2–2 on aggregate. Olympic Safi won 4–2 on penalties.

23 October 2019
19:30 UTC+4

Al-Wasl (United Arab Emirates)	1–2	(Saudi Arabia) Al-Ittihad Jeddah
Welliton 52'	Report	Romarinho 24', 90+3'

Zabeel Stadium, Dubai
Referee: Sadok Selmi (Tunisia)
4 November 2019
20:00 UTC+3

Al-Ittihad Jeddah (Saudi Arabia)	2–0	(United Arab Emirates) Al-Wasl
Prijović 29' (pen.); Romarinho 55'	Report

King Abdullah Sports City, Jeddah
Referee: Ahmed Al-Kaf (Oman)

Al-Ittihad Jeddah won 4–1 on aggregate.

== Quarter-finals ==
=== Summary ===
Team 1	Agg.	Team 2	1st leg	2nd leg
Al-Shabab (Saudi Arabia)	7–0	(Iraq) Al-Shorta	6–0	1–0
Al-Ittihad Jeddah (Saudi Arabia)	2–1	(Morocco) Olympic Safi	1–1	1–0
Al-Ittihad Alexandria (Egypt)	0–1	(Egypt) Ismaily	0–1	0–0
MC Alger (Algeria)	2–2 (a)	(Morocco) Raja Casablanca	1–2	1–0

=== Matches ===
23 December 2019
19:00 UTC+3

Al-Shabab (Saudi Arabia)	6–0	(Iraq) Al-Shorta
Asprilla 6', 8', 44'; Sebá 19' (pen.), 72'; Guanca 22'	Report

Prince Faisal bin Fahd Stadium, Riyadh
Referee: Amin Omar (Egypt)
20 January 2020
16:30 UTC+2

Al-Shorta (Iraq)	0–1	(Saudi Arabia) Al-Shabab
	Report	Guanca 89'

King Abdullah II Stadium, Amman (Jordan) (Note: The second leg fixture between Al-Shorta and Al-Shabab, originally scheduled to be played at the Karbala International Stadium in Karbala, Iraq, was played at King Abdullah II Stadium in Amman, Jordan due to security concerns from the 2019–20 Iraqi protests.)
Referee: Ammar Ashkanani (Kuwait)

Al-Shabab won 7–0 on aggregate.

15 January 2020
20:15 UTC+3

Al-Ittihad Jeddah (Saudi Arabia)	1–1	(Morocco) Olympic Safi
Al-Malki 46'	Report	Gaadaoui 28'

King Abdullah Sports City, Jeddah
Referee: Mustapha Ghorbal (Algeria)
15 February 2020
19:00 UTC+1

Olympic Safi (Morocco)	0–1	(Saudi Arabia) Al-Ittihad Jeddah
	Report	Romarinho 49'

Stade El Massira, Safi
Referee: Ammar Al-Jeneibi (United Arab Emirates)

Al-Ittihad Jeddah won 2–1 on aggregate.

28 December 2019
19:30 UTC+2

Al-Ittihad Alexandria (Egypt)	0–1	(Egypt) Ismaily
	Report	El Shamy 33'

Alexandria Stadium, Alexandria
Referee: Turki Al-Khudair (Saudi Arabia)
26 January 2020
18:00 UTC+2

Ismaily (Egypt)	0–0	(Egypt) Al-Ittihad Alexandria
	Report

Ismailia Stadium, Ismailia
Referee: Rédouane Jiyed (Morocco)

Ismaily won 1–0 on aggregate.

4 January 2020
20:00 UTC+1

MC Alger (Algeria)	1–2	(Morocco) Raja Casablanca
Frioui 29'	Report	Moutouali 58' (pen.); Malango 82'

Mustapha Tchaker Stadium, Blida
Referee: Adel Al-Naqbi (United Arab Emirates)
9 February 2020
20:00 UTC+1

Raja Casablanca (Morocco)	0–1	(Algeria) MC Alger
	Report	Frioui 42' (pen.)

Stade Mohammed V, Casablanca
Referee: Mohammed Al-Hoish (Saudi Arabia)

2–2 on aggregate. Raja Casablanca won on away goals.

== Semi-finals ==
=== Summary ===
Team 1	Agg.	Team 2	1st leg	2nd leg
Al-Shabab (Saudi Arabia)	3–4	(Saudi Arabia) Al-Ittihad Jeddah	2–2	1–2
Ismaily (Egypt)	1–3	(Morocco) Raja Casablanca	1–0	0–3

=== Matches ===
2 December 2020
19:45 UTC+3

Al-Shabab (Saudi Arabia)	2–2	(Saudi Arabia) Al-Ittihad Jeddah
Guanca 49'; Lichnovsky 79'	Report	Romarinho 11'; Rodrigues 82'

Prince Khalid bin Sultan Stadium, Riyadh
Referee: Ahmed Al-Kaf (Oman)
4 January 2021
20:00 UTC+3

Al-Ittihad Jeddah (Saudi Arabia)	2–1	(Saudi Arabia) Al-Shabab
Romarinho 74'; Prijović 90+2'	Report	Fábio Martins 1'

King Abdul Aziz Stadium, Mecca
Referee: Majed Al Shamrani (Saudi Arabia)

16 February 2020
18:00 UTC+2

Ismaily (Egypt)	1–0	(Morocco) Raja Casablanca
Ben Youssef 52' (pen.)	Report

Ismailia Stadium, Ismailia
Referee: Ahmed Al-Kaf (Oman)
11 January 2021
19:00 UTC+1

Raja Casablanca (Morocco)	3–0	(Egypt) Ismaily
Moutouali 60' (pen.); Malango 67'; Benhalib 86'	Report

Marrakesh Stadium, Marrakesh
Referee: Mohanad Qasim Sarray (Iraq)

== Final ==
The final was played on 21 August 2021 at the Prince Moulay Abdellah Stadium in Rabat, Morocco. The "home" team (for administrative purposes) was determined by an additional draw held after the quarter-final and semi-final draws.

21 August 2021
21:00 WAT (UTC+1)

Al-Ittihad Jeddah (Saudi Arabia)	4–4	(Morocco) Raja CA
Bruno Henrique 4'; Romarinho 28' (pen.), 53', 64' (pen.)	Report	Haddad 5'; Benhalib 13'; El Wardi 37'; S. Rahimi 50'
Penalties
Bruno Henrique (penalty missed); Romarinho (penalty scored); Coronado (penalty scored); Al-Muwallad (penalty missed); Al-Malki (penalty scored)	3–4	(penalty scored) S. Rahimi; (penalty scored) Zrida; (penalty missed) Madkour; (penalty scored) Hafidi; (penalty scored) Arjoune

Prince Moulay Abdellah Stadium, Rabat
Attendance: 0 (closed doors)
Referee: Mahmoud El Banna (Egypt)

== Top goalscorers ==
Team eliminated / inactive for this round.

Rank	Player	Team	FR1	FR2	SR1	SR2	QF1	QF2	SF1	SF2	F	Total
1	(Brazil) Romarinho	(Saudi Arabia) Al-Ittihad Jeddah	1		2	1		1	1	1	3	10
2	(Morocco) Mouhcine Moutouali	(Morocco) Raja Casablanca	1			2	1			1		5
3	(Colombia) Danilo Asprilla	(Saudi Arabia) Al-Shabab	1				3					4
3	(Egypt) Khaled Kamar	(Egypt) Al-Ittihad Alexandria	1	1	1	1						4
5	(Democratic Republic of the Congo) Ben Malango	(Morocco) Raja Casablanca				1	1			1		3
5	(Serbia) Aleksandar Prijović	(Saudi Arabia) Al-Ittihad Jeddah	1			1				1		3
5	(Iraq) Amjad Attwan	(Iraq) Al-Shorta				3						3
5	(United Arab Emirates) Zaid Al-Ameri	(United Arab Emirates) Al-Jazira	1	2								3
5	(Brazil) Sebá	(Saudi Arabia) Al-Shabab	1				2					3
5	(Argentina) Cristian Guanca	(Saudi Arabia) Al-Shabab					1	1	1			3
11	(Egypt) Wagih Abdel Hakim	(Egypt) Ismaily	2									2
11	(Sudan) Waleed Bakhet	(Sudan) Al-Hilal		2								2
11	(Ivory Coast) Koffi Boua	(Morocco) Olympic Safi	1	1								2
11	(Algeria) Samy Frioui	(Algeria) MC Alger					1	1				2
11	(Saudi Arabia) Abdullah Al-Hamdan	(Saudi Arabia) Al-Shabab	1	1								2
11	(Tunisia) Taha Yassine Khenissi	(Tunisia) Espérance de Tunis		2								2
11	(Brazil) Fábio Lima	(United Arab Emirates) Al-Wasl	1	1								2
11	(Democratic Republic of the Congo) Junior Mapuku	(Iraq) Al-Shorta		2								2
11	(Morocco) Mohamed Nahiri	(Morocco) Wydad Casablanca	1			1						2
11	(Democratic Republic of the Congo) Fabrice Ngoma	(Morocco) Raja Casablanca		1	1							2
11	(Namibia) Benson Shilongo	(Egypt) Ismaily			2							2
11	(Iraq) Nabeel Sabah	(Iraq) Al-Shorta				2						2
11	(Morocco) Mahmoud Benhalib	(Morocco) Raja Casablanca								1	1	2
