= Ayoub El Kaabi =

Moroccan footballer (born 1993)

- El Kaabi with Morocco in 2026

Personal information
- Date of birth: 25 June 1993 (age 33)
- Place of birth: Casablanca, Morocco
- Height: 1.82 m (6 ft 0 in)
- Position: Striker

Team information
- Current team: Olympiacos
- Number: 9

Youth career
- CH Khadija

Senior career*
Years	Team	Apps	(Gls)
2014–2017	Racing de Casablanca	33	(25)
2017–2018	RS Berkane	24	(12)
2018–2019	Hebei China Fortune	28	(9)
2019–2021	Wydad	38	(22)
2021–2023	Hatayspor	53	(26)
2023	Al Sadd	7	(2)
2023–	Olympiacos	91	(53)

International career^{‡}
2016–2017	Morocco U23	4	(0)
2018–	Morocco	72	(35)
Medal record
Men's football
Representing Morocco
Africa Cup of Nations
Winner	2025 Morocco
African Nations Championship
Winner	2018 Morocco
Winner	2020 Cameroon
- * Club domestic league appearances and goals as of 20:20, 5 September 2026 (UTC) ‡ National team caps and goals as of 08:55, 25 June 2026 (UTC)

Ayoub El Kaabi (Arabic: أيوب الكعبي, Berber languages: ⴰⵢⵢⵓⴱ ⵍⴽⵄⴱⵉ; born 25 June 1993) is a Moroccan professional footballer who plays as a striker for Super League Greece club Olympiacos and the Morocco national team.

Born in Casablanca, El Kaabi left school at the age of 15 and worked as a carpenter, before he started his professional career playing for Racing de Casablanca. After a career at various teams and a short spell at Al Sadd, he signed for Greek club Olympiacos.

While with Olympiacos, El Kaabi emerged as the top scorer of the 2023–24 UEFA Europa Conference League, with eleven goals, and joint top scorer of the 2024–25 UEFA Europa League, with seven goals in just eight appearances. With Olympiacos, he has won one Conference League title, as well as one Super League 1 title and one Greek Cup title.

A full international for Morocco since 2018, El Kaabi represented the nation at the 2018 and 2026 FIFA World Cup, three Africa Cup of Nations tournaments, two African Nations Championship tournaments, claiming three international titles: the 2018 African Nations Championship, 2020 African Nations Championship and the 2025 Africa Cup of Nations. He was the top goalscorer of the 2018 African Nations Championship, with a record nine goals.

== Early life ==
Ayoub El Kaabi was born and raised in the disadvantaged neighborhood of Derb Milla in Casablanca. His family is from Zagora in southern Morocco, but moved to the region of Mediouna near Casablanca. The El Kaabi family went through difficult times in the 1990s. As a result, El Kaabi left school at the age of 15 and worked at a shop in the Mediouna district as an apprentice carpenter. As he explained in an interview with the Moroccan press: "I was born into a modest family. To support myself, I had to learn a trade. That's how I got into carpentry."

Like nearly all young people in the city, El Kaabi was interested in football from a young age and he played football with his neighborhood friends. Realising his unique talent, his entourage advised him to join a club in the Hay Khadija district. After only a few months, he came to the attention of the scouts of Racing de Casablanca who were impressed with his technical ability and physical presence. El Kaabi gave up carpentry to devote himself to football and signed his first professional contract at the age of 21 with Racing Club in 2014.

== Club career ==
=== Racing de Casablanca ===
After playing for CH Khadija as a youth player, El Kaabi joined Racing de Casablanca in 2014. Prior to breaking into the first team at Racing de Casablanca, El Kaabi played for amateur sides Ettifaq Lalla Meryem and Club Chaâb de Casablanca on loan. El Kaabi initially began his career at Racing de Casablanca as a left-back due to his speed and stamina, the club switched him to defensive midfielder, and then to forward after Racing de Casablanca's manager saw his great finishing ability. He was credited with helping the club gain promotion to the Botola Pro.

=== RS Berkane ===
Ayoub El Kaabi joined RS Berkane on transfer from Racing during summer 2017 as top scorer in the Botola 2 during the 2016–17 season with 25 goals. El Kaabi won the 2018 Moroccan Throne Cup when Berkane defeated Wydad de Fès in the final on penalties.

=== Hebei China Fortune ===
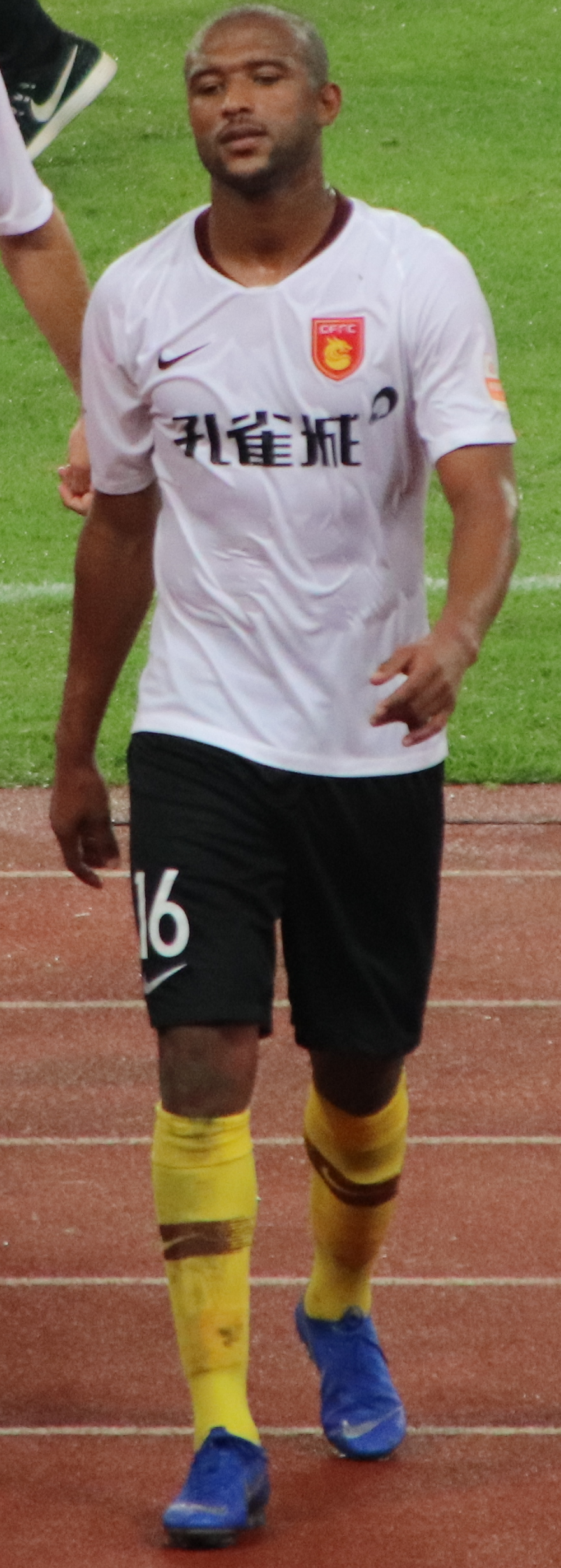
El Kaabi playing for Hebei China Fortune

In 2018, El Kaabi was purchased by Hebei China Fortune for a transfer fee of €6.5 million.

On 2 August, El Kaabi scored his first goal for the club against Beijing Guoan.

=== Wydad ===
In July 2019, El Kaabi joined Wydad AC. He took part in the qualifying stages of the 2019–20 CAF Champions League before signing to the Turkish side Hatayspor. During the competition El Kaabi managed to score a hat-trick against Atlético Petróleos de Luanda marking his final match for Wydad. He finished as the top scorer of the Botola in the 2020–21 season with 18 goals.

=== Hatayspor ===
In 2021, El Kaabi signed a two-year contract until June 2023 with Hatayspor, after having made the heyday of Wydad in Casablanca.

On 23 August 2021, El Kaabi made his debut for the team, after being substituted in 76th minute for Mame Diouf against Galatasaray, the game ended in a 2–1 loss. On 28 August he scored his first goal with the team after a 5–0 victory against Alanyaspor. On 27 February 2022, El Kaabi scored his first hat-trick for the club in a 5–2 win against Yeni Malatyaspor. Due to the 2023 Turkey–Syria earthquake, the club withdrew from the league after the club's quarters in Antakya collapsed. This forced El Kaabi to search for another club.

=== Al Sadd ===
On 1 March 2023, Qatari club Al Sadd SC reached an agreement with El Kaabi to join the club until the end of the current season. On 3 March, he came on in the 81st minute in place of Akram Afif and played his first match against Al-Sailiya SC. On 7 March 2023, El Kaabi scored his first goal in his second appearance for the club. In the league, he received his first start on 17 March against Al-Shamal SC.

El Kaabi ended the season as third in the championship and finalist in the Qatar Cup played on 6 April 2023 against Al-Duhail SC in Doha.

=== Olympiacos ===
On 6 August 2023, it was announced that El Kaabi would join Greek side Olympiacos. El Kaabi made his debut four days later against K.R.C. Genk in the 2023–24 UEFA Europa League qualifying phase and play-off round. He managed to score a brace in his fourth appearance for the team in a 3–1 victory against FK Čukarički. On 21 September 2023, El Kaabi scored a brace against SC Freiburg in the Europa League group stage. Six days later, El Kaabi went on to score another brace against Aris Thessaloniki. In the 2023–24 UEFA Europa Conference League, El Kaabi scored a goal in the first and second leg of the knockout round play-offs, thus qualifying them for the round of 16. In the round of 16, Olympiacos faced Maccabi Tel Aviv, with El Kaabi scoring a goal in the first leg and a brace in the second, again qualifying them for the final 8.

On 2 May, El Kaabi scored a hat-trick in a 4–2 away win over Aston Villa in the Europa Conference League semi-final first leg, the first ever hat-trick at the semifinal phase of Conference League. A week later, on 9 May, he scored a brace in a 2–0 victory against Aston Villa in the second leg, sending his club to the Conference League final, the first European final in their history. He scored the only goal of the final in extra time as Olympiacos defeated Fiorentina 1–0 to become the first Greek side to win a major European trophy. El Kaabi scored a total of 11 goals at the knockout phase, more than any other player during any single UEFA club competition, while the total of 14 goals during the group stage and knockout phases is a record for an African player.

During a match against AEK in the 2024–25 Super League Greece play-offs, he scored the only goal of the game at 55 minutes. Olympiacos thus defeated AEK and were crowned champions. On 17 May 2025, El Kaabi scored in the final of the Greek Cup to defeat OFI to help the club secure a domestic double.

On 5 September 2026, during a match against Volos F.C. in the 2026–27 Super League Greece season, he sustained a leg fracture following a collision with the opposing team's goalkeeper and was carried off the pitch. He successfully underwent surgery the following day.

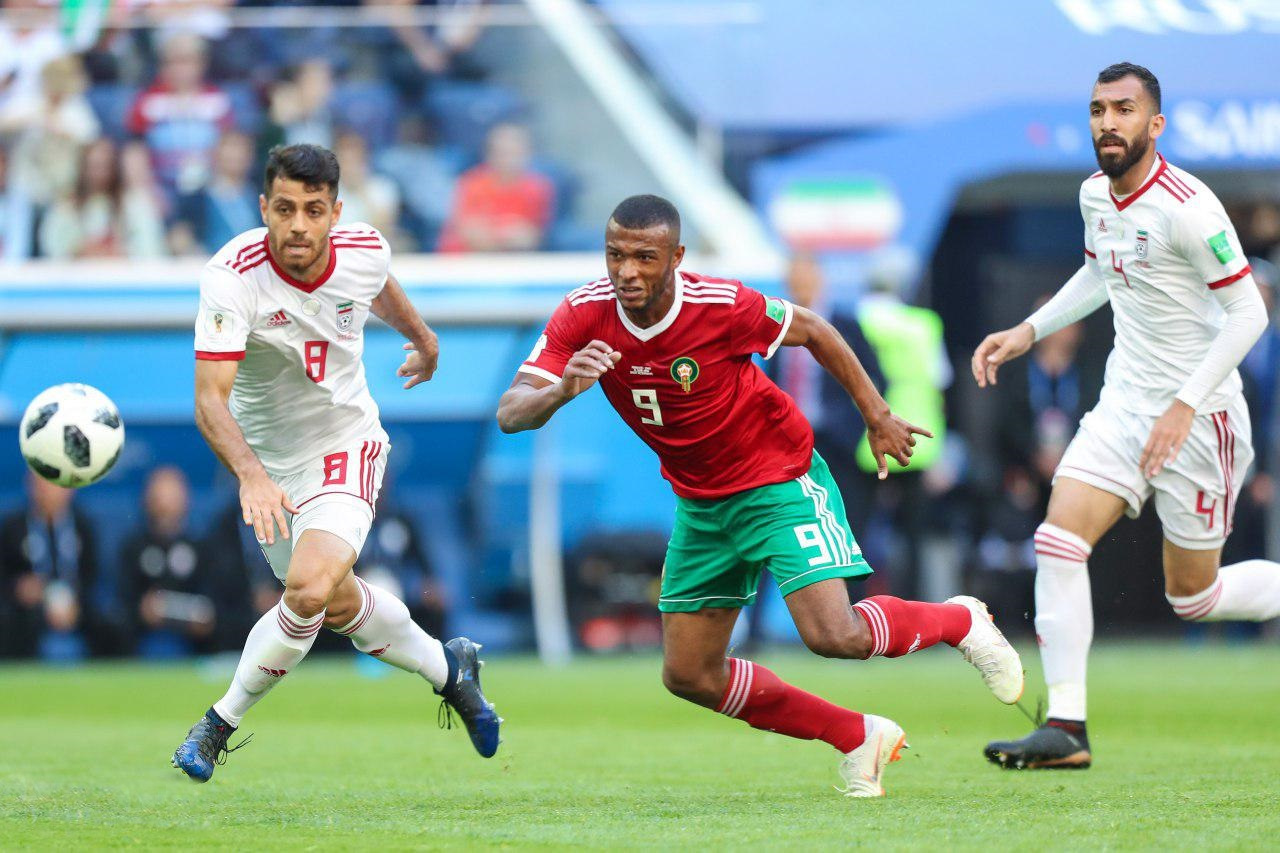
El Kaabi vs Iran in the 2018 World Cup

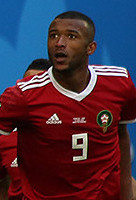
El Kaabi with Morocco during the 2018 FIFA World Cup

== International career ==
El Kaabi made his international debut for the Morocco national team on 13 January 2018 in a 2018 Africa Nations Championship group stage match against Mauritania, scoring two goals.

The footballer was named Man of The Match on 31 January after Morocco's match against Libya during CHAN's semi-final match. Morocco won the game 3–1. Morocco was set to face Nigeria in the finals. On 4 February 2018, Morocco defeated Nigeria 4–0, El Kaabi scored a goal in the 73rd minute of the match. The Confederation of African Football (CAF) chose El Kaabi as the best player of the tournament, and he was top scorer with 9 goals in 5 matches. El Kaabi scored his first international hat trick for the local national team on 17 January 2018 against Guinea. In May 2018, he was named in Morocco's 23-man squad for the 2018 FIFA World Cup in Russia. He played only 2 matches out of the 3 in the World Cup, played the first match as the starting 11 against Iran and coming on the 69th minute as substitute for Khalid Boutaib against Portugal. El Kaabi represented Morocco in the 2020 African Nations Championship, scoring a total of three goals which helped his country to achieve the title and becoming the first and only country to win the Championship back to back. His most appreciated goal is the goal he scored in the final against Mali in the 79th minute that guaranteed them the win. After his performances with the Moroccan A' for two years achieving two African titles, the coach of the main Morocco national team, Vahid Halilhodžić, was impressed and decided to call him up to represent Morocco in 2022 World Cup qualifiers. In his first six matches with the team, he managed to score five goals. On 28 December 2023, he was named in the 27-man squad for the 2023 Africa Cup of Nations in Ivory Coast. On 11 June 2024, El Kaabi scored his first hat-trick for the national team in a 6–0 victory against Congo during the 2026 World Cup qualification.

On 11 December 2025, El Kaabi was called up to the Morocco squad for the 2025 Africa Cup of Nations. On 17 March 2026, El Kaabi's Morocco were crowned AFCON winners after CAF overturned Senegal's result and awarded a 3‑0 victory.

On 26 May 2026, El Kaabi was selected in the 26-man squad for the 2026 FIFA World Cup.

== Playing style ==
A competition ambassador at the 2018 African Nations Championship, Adel Chedli, described El Kaabi as reminiscent of Didier Drogba, Samuel Eto'o and Florent Malouda.

== Personal life ==
El Kaabi married his wife, Chaimae, in a traditional ceremony in Casablanca on 26 November 2018. The wedding was attended by family, friends, and notable figures from the football community.

On 9 September 2023, El Kaabi, along with his national teammates, donated blood to those injured in the 2023 Marrakesh-Safi earthquake.

== Career statistics ==
=== Club ===
As of match played 5 September 2026

Appearances and goals by club, season and competition
Club	Season	League			National cup (Note: Includes Moroccan Throne Cup, Turkish Cup, Emir Cup, Greek Cup)		League cup (Note: Includes Qatari Stars Cup)		Continental		Other		Total	
Club	Season	Division	Apps	Goals	Apps	Goals	Apps	Goals	Apps	Goals	Apps	Goals	Apps	Goals
RAC	2016–17	Botola Pro D2	33	25	0	0	–		–		–		33	25
RS Berkane	2017–18	Botola Pro	24	12	6	5	–		8 (Note: Appearances in CAF Confederation Cup)	6	–		38	23
Hebei China Fortune	2018	Chinese Super League	13	5	0	0	–		–		–		13	5
Hebei China Fortune	2019	Chinese Super League	15	4	0	0	–		–		–		15	4
Hebei China Fortune	Total		28	9	0	0	–		–		–		28	9
Wydad AC	2019–20	Botola Pro	9	4	1	1	–		4 (Note: Appearances in CAF Champions League)	4	4 (Note: Appearances in Arab Club Champions Cup)	1	18	10
Wydad AC	2020–21	Botola Pro	29	18	4	4	–		10	4	–		43	26
Wydad AC	Total		38	22	5	5	–		14	8	4	1	61	36
Hatayspor	2021–22	Süper Lig	32	18	2	0	–		–		–		34	18
Hatayspor	2022–23	Süper Lig	21	8	0	0	–		–		–		21	8
Hatayspor	Total		53	26	2	0	–		–		–		55	26
Al-Sadd	2022–23	Qatar Stars League	7	2	4	3	1	1	–		1 (Note: Appearance in Qatar Cup)	0	13	6
Olympiacos	2023–24	Super League Greece	31	17	0	0	–		19 (Note: Ten appearances and five goals in UEFA Europa League, nine appearances and eleven goals in UEFA Europa Conference League)	16	–		50	33
Olympiacos	2024–25	Super League Greece	29	18	7	2	–		8 (Note: Appearances in UEFA Europa League)	7	–		44	27
Olympiacos	2025–26	Super League Greece	28	18	2	1	–		10 (Note: Appearances in UEFA Champions League)	2	–		40	21
Olympiacos	2026–27	Super League Greece	3	0	0	0	–		2	1	–		5	1
Olympiacos	Total		91	53	9	3	–		38	26	–		139	82
Career total			275	150	26	16	1	1	60	40	5	1	367	207

=== International ===
As of match played 24 June 2026

Appearances and goals by national team and year
National team	Year	Apps	Goals
Morocco	2018	14	11
Morocco	2019	2	0
Morocco	2020	0	0
Morocco	2021	12	8
Morocco	2022	8	1
Morocco	2023	4	2
Morocco	2024	13	4
Morocco	2025	10	6
Morocco	2026	9	3
Total		72	35

Scores and results list Morocco score listed first, score column indicates score after each El Kaabi goal.

List of international goals scored by Ayoub El Kaabi
No.	Date	Venue	Opponent	Score	Result	Competition
1	13 January 2018	Stade Mohammed V, Casablanca, Morocco	Mauritania	1–0	4–0	2018 African Nations Championship
2	13 January 2018	Stade Mohammed V, Casablanca, Morocco	Mauritania	3–0	4–0	2018 African Nations Championship
3	17 January 2018	Stade Mohammed V, Casablanca, Morocco	Guinea	1–0	3–1	2018 African Nations Championship
4	17 January 2018	Stade Mohammed V, Casablanca, Morocco	Guinea	2–1	3–1	2018 African Nations Championship
5	17 January 2018	Stade Mohammed V, Casablanca, Morocco	Guinea	3–1	3–1	2018 African Nations Championship
6	27 January 2018	Stade Mohammed V, Casablanca, Morocco	Namibia	1–0	2–0	2018 African Nations Championship
7	31 January 2018	Stade Mohammed V, Casablanca, Morocco	Libya	1–0	3–1	2018 African Nations Championship
8	31 January 2018	Stade Mohammed V, Casablanca, Morocco	Libya	2–1	3–1	2018 African Nations Championship
9	4 February 2018	Stade Mohammed V, Casablanca, Morocco	Nigeria	4–0	4–0	2018 African Nations Championship
10	27 March 2018	Stade Mohammed V, Casablanca, Morocco	Uzbekistan	1–0	2–0	Friendly
11	4 June 2018	Stade de Genève, Geneva, Switzerland	Slovakia	1–1	2–1	Friendly
12	26 January 2021	Stade de la Réunification, Douala, Cameroon	Uganda	1–1	5–2	2020 African Nations Championship
13	31 January 2021	Stade de la Réunification, Douala, Cameroon	Zambia	3–0	3–1	2020 African Nations Championship
14	7 February 2021	Stade Ahmadou Ahidjo, Yaoundé, Cameroon	Mali	2–0	2–0	2020 African Nations Championship
15	6 October 2021	Prince Moulay Abdellah Stadium, Rabat, Morocco	Guinea-Bissau	4–0	5–0	2022 FIFA World Cup qualification
16	9 October 2021	Stade Mohammed V, Casablanca, Morocco	Guinea-Bissau	1–0	3–0	2022 FIFA World Cup qualification
17	9 October 2021	Stade Mohammed V, Casablanca, Morocco	Guinea-Bissau	2–0	3–0	2022 FIFA World Cup qualification
18	12 October 2021	Moulay Abdellah Stadium, Rabat, Morocco	Guinea	1–0	4–1	2022 FIFA World Cup qualification
19	16 November 2021	Moulay Abdellah Stadium, Rabat, Morocco	Guinea	3–0	3–0	2022 FIFA World Cup qualification
20	9 June 2022	Moulay Abdellah Stadium, Rabat, Morocco	South Africa	2–1	2–1	2023 Africa Cup of Nations qualification
21	14 October 2023	Felix Houphouet Boigny Stadium, Abidjan, Ivory Coast	Ivory Coast	1–1	1–1	Friendly
22	17 October 2023	Adrar Stadium, Agadir, Morocco	Liberia	2–0	3–0	2023 Africa Cup of Nations qualification
23	11 June 2024	Adrar Stadium, Agadir, Morocco	Congo	3–0	6–0	2026 FIFA World Cup qualification
24	11 June 2024	Adrar Stadium, Agadir, Morocco	Congo	4–0	6–0	2026 FIFA World Cup qualification
25	11 June 2024	Adrar Stadium, Agadir, Morocco	Congo	5–0	6–0	2026 FIFA World Cup qualification
26	6 September 2024	Adrar Stadium, Agadir, Morocco	Gabon	4–1	4–1	2025 Africa Cup of Nations qualification
27	6 June 2025	Fez Stadium, Fez, Morocco	Tunisia	2–0	2–0	Friendly
28	9 June 2025	Fez Stadium, Fez, Morocco	Benin	1–0	1–0	Friendly
29	5 September 2025	Prince Moulay Abdellah Stadium, Rabat, Morocco	Niger	3–0	5–0	2026 FIFA World Cup qualification
30	21 December 2025	Prince Moulay Abdellah Stadium, Rabat, Morocco	Comoros	2–0	2–0	2025 Africa Cup of Nations
31	29 December 2025	Prince Moulay Abdellah Stadium, Rabat, Morocco	Zambia	1–0	3–0	2025 Africa Cup of Nations
32	29 December 2025	Prince Moulay Abdellah Stadium, Rabat, Morocco	Zambia	3–0	3–0	2025 Africa Cup of Nations
33	26 May 2026	Mohammed VI Football Complexe, Salé, Morocco	Burundi	1–0	5–0	Friendly
34	26 May 2026	Mohammed VI Football Complexe, Salé, Morocco	Burundi	2–0	5–0	Friendly
35	2 June 2026	Prince Moulay Abdellah Stadium, Rabat, Morocco	Madagascar	4–0	4–0	Friendly

== Honours ==
RS Berkane

- Moroccan Throne Cup: 2018

Wydad AC

- Botola Pro: 2020–21

Olympiacos

- Super League Greece: 2024–25
- Greek Cup: 2024–25
- UEFA Europa Conference League: 2023–24

Morocco A'

- African Nations Championship: 2018, 2020

Morocco

- Africa Cup of Nations: 2025

Individual

- Botola Pro D2 top scorer: 2016–17
- Moroccan Throne Cup top scorer: 2017–18, 2019–20
- RS Berkane Player of the Season: 2018
- African Nations Championship Best Player: 2018
- African Nations Championship top scorer: 2018
- African Nations Championship Team of the Tournament: 2018, 2020
- Botola Pro top scorer: 2020–21
- Botola Pro Team of the Season: 2020–21
- Wydad AC Player of the Season: 2020–21
- Süper Lig Team of the Season: 2021–22
- Super League Greece Player of the Month: September 2023
- Super League Greece Player of the Season: 2023–24
- Super League Greece Best Foreign Player: 2023–24, 2024–25
- Super League Greece Team of the Season: 2023–24, 2024–25, 2025–26
- Super League Greece top scorer: 2025–26
- Greek Cup Final Man of the Match: 2025
- Super League Greece Best Goal: 2025–26 Regular season (Matchday 4, Matchday 7)
- Olympiacos Player of the Season: 2023–24
- L'Équipe's African Team of the Year: 2024
- IFFHS CAF Best Goal Scorer: 2024
- UEFA Europa Conference League Player of the Season: 2023–24
- UEFA Europa Conference League top scorer: 2023–24
- UEFA Europa Conference League Team of the Season: 2023–24
- UEFA Europa Conference League Goal of the Season: 2023−24
- UEFA Europa Conference League Final Man of the Match: 2024
- UEFA Europa League top scorer: 2024–25 (joint)

=== Records ===
- Morocco A' All-time Top scorer
- Top scorer in a single CHAN edition
- Current top scorer of CHAN
- First player to hit double digit goals In CHAN history
- First African player to finish as top scorer in a European club competition (16 goals)
- First player to score in a European final for a Greek club Olympiacos
- Most European goals in a season for Olympiacos
- Most goals scored in a Europa Conference League knockout campaign (11 goals)
- Most goals scored in a season in the knockout stage of any single UEFA club competition (11 goals)
- Top scorer in the history of Olympiacos in European competitions
