= Kazadi Kasengu =

Democratic Republic of the Congo footballer

Personal information
- Full name: Kazadi Kasengu
- Date of birth: 20 July 1992 (age 34)
- Place of birth: Kinshasa, Zaire
- Height: 1.74 m (5 ft 9 in)
- Position: Forward

Team information
- Current team: Singida United
- Number: 17

Senior career*
Years	Team	Apps	(Gls)
2013–2016	AS Vita Club		
2016–2018	Daring Club Motema Pembe	22	(8)
2018–2019	AS Vita Club	30	(18)
2019	SCC Mohammédia	0	(0)
2020	Wydad Casablanca	17	(8)
2021	Al Masry	23	(2)
2021–2022	Tala'ea El Gaish	23	(2)
2023–	Singida United		

International career^{‡}
2017–	DR Congo	5	(1)
- * Club domestic league appearances and goals as of 31 December 2022 ‡ National team caps and goals as of 11:48, 15 October 2021 (UTC)

Kazadi Kasengu (born 20 July 1992) is an DR Congolese professional footballer who plays as a forward for Singida United in Tanzania

== Career statistics ==
=== International ===
Appearances and goals by national team and year
National team	Year	Apps	Goals
DR Congo	2017	1	0
DR Congo	2018	1	0
DR Congo	2019	–	
DR Congo	2020	1	0
DR Congo	2021	2	1
Total		5	1

Scores and results list DR Congo's goal tally first, score column indicates score after each Kasengu goal.

List of international goals scored by Kazadi Kasengu
No.	Date	Venue	Opponent	Score	Result	Competition
1	29 March 2021	Stade des Martyrs, Kinshasa, DR Congo	Gambia	1–0	1–0	2021 Africa Cup of Nations qualification
