= 2019–20 Arab Club Champions Cup =

2019–20 Mohammed VI Champions Cup

Tournament details
- Dates: Qualifying: 18–25 August 2019; Competition proper: 20 August 2019 – 21 August 2021
- Teams: Competition proper: 32; Total: 38 (from 20 associations)

Final positions
- Champions: (Morocco) Raja CA (2nd title)
- Runners-up: (Saudi Arabia) Al-Ittihad Jeddah

Tournament statistics
- Top scorer(s): (Brazil) Romarinho (10 goals)

The 2019–20 Arab Club Champions Cup, officially named the 2019–20 Mohammed VI Champions Cup (Arabic: كأس محمد السادس للأندية الأبطال 2019–20) after Mohammed VI of Morocco, where the final was hosted, was the 29th season (Note: Not including the cancelled 1990 edition.) of the Arab Club Champions Cup, the Arab world's club football tournament organised by UAFA.

Étoile du Sahel were the defending champions, having won their first title in the previous edition. They were eliminated by Shabab Al-Ordon in the first round. The tournament was postponed for ten months in 2020 due to the COVID-19 pandemic, and the final was played on 21 August 2021, where Raja Casablanca defeated Al-Ittihad Jeddah on penalties after a 4–4 draw to earn their second title.

== Teams ==
A total of 38 teams participated in the tournament; 19 from Africa and 19 from Asia. 8 clubs started in the preliminary round where two of them advanced to the first round which consisted of 32 teams. From then on, the tournament was played in a knockout format with home and away legs, until the final which was a one-leg match played at the Prince Moulay Abdellah Stadium in Rabat, Morocco.

Asia Zone
Team	League position	App (Last)
First round entrants
(Saudi Arabia) Al-Shabab	2018–19 Saudi Professional League fifth place	5th (2007–08)
(Saudi Arabia) Al-Ittihad Jeddah	2018–19 Saudi Professional League tenth place	11th (2018–19)
(United Arab Emirates) Al-Jazira	2018–19 UAE Pro-League fifth place	2nd (2018–19)
(United Arab Emirates) Al-Wasl	2018–19 UAE Pro-League ninth place	3rd (2018–19)
(Iraq) Al-Shorta	2018–19 Iraqi Premier League champions	3rd (2003)
(Iraq) Al-Quwa Al-Jawiya	2018–19 Iraqi Premier League runners-up	5th (2018–19)
(Jordan) Shabab Al-Ordon	2018–19 Jordanian Pro League fourth place	5th (2012–13)
(Syria) Al-Jaish	2018–19 Syrian Premier League champions	9th (2018–19)
(Lebanon) Al-Ahed	2018–19 Lebanese Football League champions	3rd (2017)
(Lebanon) Nejmeh	2018–19 Lebanese Football League third place	8th (2018–19)
(Bahrain) Al-Muharraq	2018–19 Bahraini Premier League third place	6th (2018–19)
(Oman) Dhofar	2018–19 Oman Professional League champions	2nd (2008–09)
(Oman) Al-Nasr	2018–19 Oman Professional League runners-up	2nd (2003–04)
(Palestine) Hilal Al-Quds	2018–19 West Bank Premier League champions	5th (2001)
Al-Kuwait	2018–19 Kuwaiti Premier League champions	8th (2018–19)
(Kuwait) Al-Salmiya	2018–19 Kuwaiti Premier League third place	3rd (2018–19)
(Kuwait) Al-Arabi	2018–19 Kuwaiti Premier League fifth place	5th (2012–13)
Preliminary round entrants
(Iraq) Al-Zawraa	2018–19 Iraqi Premier League third place	3rd (Note: Not including the club's appearance in the cancelled 1990 edition.) (2005–06)
(Bahrain) Al-Riffa	2018–19 Bahraini Premier League champions	10th (2018–19)

Africa Zone
Team	League position	App (Last)
First round entrants
(Morocco) Wydad Casablanca	2018–19 Botola champions	7th (2018–19)
(Morocco) Raja Casablanca	2018–19 Botola runners-up	10th (2018–19)
(Morocco) Olympic Safi	2018–19 Botola fourth place	2nd (2005–06)
(Tunisia) Espérance de Tunis	2018–19 Tunisian Ligue Professionnelle 1 champions	9th (2018–19)
(Tunisia) Étoile du Sahel	2018–19 Tunisian Ligue Professionnelle 1 runners-up	5th (2018–19)
(Egypt) Ismaily	2018–19 Egyptian Premier League seventh place	8th (2018–19)
(Egypt) Al-Ittihad Alexandria	2018–19 Egyptian Premier League eleventh place	2nd (2018–19)
(Algeria) MC Alger	2018–19 Algerian Ligue Professionnelle 1 sixth place	5th (2018–19)
(Algeria) CS Constantine	2018–19 Algerian Ligue Professionnelle 1 seventh place	1st
(Sudan) Al-Merrikh	2018–19 Sudan Premier League champions	12th (2018–19)
(Sudan) Al-Hilal	2018–19 Sudan Premier League runners-up	10th (2008–09)
(Libya) Al-Ahly Benghazi	2017–18 Libyan Premier League runners-up	1st
(Mauritania) FC Nouadhibou	2018–19 Ligue 1 Mauritania champions	2nd (2003–04)
Preliminary round entrants
(Morocco) Ittihad Tanger	2018–19 Botola fifth place	1st
(Tunisia) CA Bizertin	2018–19 Tunisian Ligue Professionnelle 1 sixth place	6th (2012–13)
(Algeria) JS Saoura	2018–19 Algerian Ligue Professionnelle 1 fourth place	1st
(Comoros) Fomboni	2019 Comoros Premier League champions	1st
ASAS Djibouti Télécom	2018–19 Djibouti Premier League third place	3rd (2018–19)
(Somalia) Horseed	2019 Somali First Division runners-up	1st

Associations which did not enter a team
- Qatar
- Yemen

== Prize money ==
The prize money is as follows:

- Winners: $6,000,000
- Runners-up: $2,500,000
- Semi-finalists: $500,000
- Quarter-finalists: $200,000
- Second round: $50,000
- First round: $20,000

== Round and draw dates ==
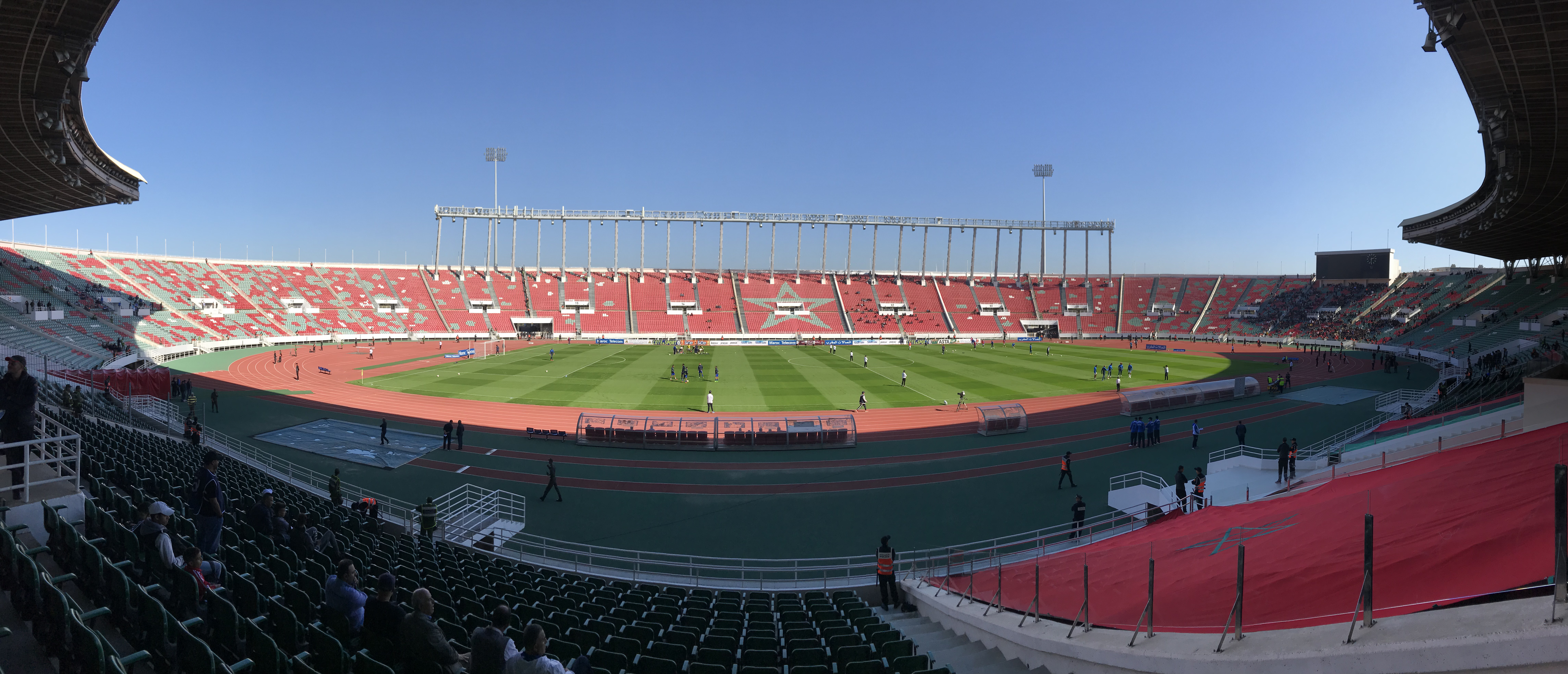
The Prince Moulay Abdellah Stadium in Rabat hosted the final.

The schedule is as follows.

Round	Draw date	First leg	Second leg
Preliminary round	27 July 2019	18–25 August 2019	
First round	27 July 2019	20 August – 24 September 2019	30 August – 3 October 2019
Second round	5 October 2019	23 October – 8 November 2019	4 November – 16 December 2019
Quarter-finals	4 December 2019	23 December 2019 – 15 January 2020	20 January – 15 February 2020
Semi-finals	4 December 2019	16 February – 2 December 2020	4 January – 11 January 2021
Final	4 December 2019	21 August 2021 at Prince Moulay Abdellah Stadium, Rabat	

== Preliminary round ==
=== Group A ===
Pos	Team	Pld	W	D	L	GF	GA	GD	Pts	Qualification	RSC	IRT	ZSC	HOR
1	(Bahrain) Al-Riffa	3	3	0	0	8	0	+8	9	Advance to First round	—			5–0
2	(Morocco) Ittihad Tanger	3	2	0	1	9	3	+6	6		0–2	—	3–0	
3	(Iraq) Al-Zawraa	3	1	0	2	2	4	−2	3		0–1		—	2–0
4	(Somalia) Horseed	3	0	0	3	1	13	−12	0			1–6		—

Updated to match(es) played on 24 August 2019. Source: Goalzz
Rules for classification: 1) Points; 2) Goal difference; 3) Goals scored.

=== Group B ===
Pos	Team	Pld	W	D	L	GF	GA	GD	Pts	Qualification	JSS	CAB	TEL	FOM
1	(Algeria) JS Saoura	3	3	0	0	7	0	+7	9	Advance to First round	—		1–0	
2	(Tunisia) CA Bizertin	3	2	0	1	10	1	+9	6		0–1	—	3–0	
3	ASAS Djibouti Télécom	3	1	0	2	3	6	−3	3				—	3–2
4	(Comoros) Fomboni	3	0	0	3	2	15	−13	0		0–5	0–7		—

Updated to match(es) played on 25 August 2019. Source: Goalzz
Rules for classification: 1) Points; 2) Goal difference; 3) Goals scored.

== Knockout stage ==
=== Bracket ===
First round
(Algeria) JS Saoura	1	0	1
(Saudi Arabia) Al-Shabab	3	2	5
(Jordan) Shabab Al-Ordon	2	1	3
(Tunisia) Étoile du Sahel	1	0	1
(Syria) Al-Jaish	1	0	1
(Mauritania) FC Nouadhibou	1	1	2
Al-Kuwait	3	0	3
(Iraq) Al-Shorta (a)	1	2	3
(United Arab Emirates) Al-Wasl	2	1	3
(Sudan) Al-Hilal	0	2	2
(Saudi Arabia) Al-Ittihad Jeddah	3	0	3
(Lebanon) Al-Ahed	0	0	0
(Morocco) Olympic Safi	1	1	2
(Bahrain) Al-Riffa	1	0	1
(Lebanon) Nejmeh	1	0	1
(Tunisia) Espérance de Tunis	1	2	3
(Kuwait) Al-Arabi	0	0	0
(Egypt) Al-Ittihad Alexandria	1	2	3
(Algeria) CS Constantine	3	0	3
(Bahrain) Al-Muharraq (a)	1	2	3
(Egypt) Ismaily	4	0	4
(Libya) Al-Ahly Benghazi	2	1	3
(Oman) Al-Nasr	0	1	1
(United Arab Emirates) Al-Jazira	1	3	4
(Iraq) Al-Quwa Al-Jawiya	3	1	4
(Kuwait) Al-Salmiya	1	1	2
(Algeria) MC Alger	1	1	2
(Oman) Dhofar	0	1	1
(Morocco) Raja Casablanca	1	2	3
(Palestine) Hilal Al-Quds	0	0	0
(Sudan) Al-Merrikh	1	0	1
(Morocco) Wydad Casablanca	1	2	3

Second round
(Saudi Arabia) Al-Shabab	1	1	2
(Jordan) Shabab Al-Ordon	0	1	1
(Mauritania) FC Nouadhibou	0	0	0
(Iraq) Al-Shorta	1	5	6
(United Arab Emirates) Al-Wasl	1	0	1
(Saudi Arabia) Al-Ittihad Jeddah	2	2	4
(Morocco) Olympic Safi (p)	1	1	2 (4)
(Tunisia) Espérance de Tunis	1	1	2 (2)
(Egypt) Al-Ittihad Alexandria	2	1	3
(Bahrain) Al-Muharraq	0	0	0
(Egypt) Ismaily	2	2	4
(United Arab Emirates) Al-Jazira	0	0	0
(Iraq) Al-Quwa Al-Jawiya	0	0	0 (2)
(Algeria) MC Alger (p)	0	0	0 (4)
(Morocco) Raja Casablanca (a)	1	4	5
(Morocco) Wydad Casablanca	1	4	5

Quarter-finals
(Saudi Arabia) Al-Shabab	6	1	7
(Iraq) Al-Shorta	0	0	0
(Saudi Arabia) Al-Ittihad Jeddah	1	1	2
(Morocco) Olympic Safi	1	0	1
(Egypt) Al-Ittihad Alexandria	0	0	0
(Egypt) Ismaily	1	0	1
(Algeria) MC Alger	1	1	2
(Morocco) Raja Casablanca (a)	2	0	2

Semi-finals
(Saudi Arabia) Al-Shabab	2	1	3
(Saudi Arabia) Al-Ittihad Jeddah	2	2	4
(Egypt) Ismaily	1	0	1
(Morocco) Raja Casablanca	0	3	3

Final
(Saudi Arabia) Al-Ittihad Jeddah	4 (3)
(Morocco) Raja Casablanca (p)	4 (4)

=== First round ===
The draw for the first round was held on 27 July 2019.

Team 1	Agg.	Team 2	1st leg	2nd leg
Al-Quwa Al-Jawiya (Iraq)	4–2	(Kuwait) Al-Salmiya	3–1	1–1
Shabab Al-Ordon (Jordan)	3–1	(Tunisia) Étoile du Sahel	2–1	1–0
Al-Jaish (Syria)	1–2	(Mauritania) FC Nouadhibou	1–1	0–1
Al-Merrikh (Sudan)	1–3	(Morocco) Wydad Casablanca	1–1	0–2
Ismaily (Egypt)	4–3	(Libya) Al-Ahly Benghazi	4–2	0–1
Al-Nasr (Oman)	1–4	(United Arab Emirates) Al-Jazira	0–1	1–3
Al-Wasl (United Arab Emirates)	3–2	(Sudan) Al-Hilal	2–0	1–2
Al-Arabi (Kuwait)	0–3	(Egypt) Al-Ittihad Alexandria	0–1	0–2
Olympic Safi (Morocco)	2–1	(Bahrain) Al-Riffa	1–1	1–0
Nejmeh (Lebanon)	1–3	(Tunisia) Espérance de Tunis	1–1	0–2
MC Alger (Algeria)	2–1	(Oman) Dhofar	1–0	1–1
Al-Kuwait	3–3 (a)	(Iraq) Al-Shorta	3–1	0–2
Raja Casablanca (Morocco)	3–0	(Palestine) Hilal Al-Quds	1–0	2–0
JS Saoura (Algeria)	1–5	(Saudi Arabia) Al-Shabab	1–3	0–2
CS Constantine (Algeria)	3–3 (a)	(Bahrain) Al-Muharraq	3–1	0–2
Al-Ittihad Jeddah (Saudi Arabia)	3–0 (Note: Order of legs reversed after original draw.)	(Lebanon) Al-Ahed	3–0	0–0

=== Second round ===
The draw for the second round was held on 5 October 2019.

Team 1	Agg.	Team 2	1st leg	2nd leg
Al-Quwa Al-Jawiya (Iraq)	0–0 (2–4 p)	(Algeria) MC Alger	0–0	0–0
Al-Ittihad Alexandria (Egypt)	3–0	(Bahrain) Al-Muharraq	2–0	1–0
Al-Shabab (Saudi Arabia)	2–1	(Jordan) Shabab Al-Ordon	1–0	1–1
Raja Casablanca (Morocco)	5–5 (a)	(Morocco) Wydad Casablanca	1–1	4–4
FC Nouadhibou (Mauritania)	0–6	(Iraq) Al-Shorta	0–1	0–5
Ismaily (Egypt)	4–0	(United Arab Emirates) Al-Jazira	2–0	2–0
Olympic Safi (Morocco)	2–2 (4–2 p)	(Tunisia) Espérance de Tunis	1–1	1–1
Al-Wasl (United Arab Emirates)	1–4	(Saudi Arabia) Al-Ittihad Jeddah	1–2	0–2

=== Quarter-finals ===
The draw for the quarter-finals was held on 4 December 2019.

Team 1	Agg.	Team 2	1st leg	2nd leg
Al-Shabab (Saudi Arabia)	7–0	(Iraq) Al-Shorta	6–0	1–0
Al-Ittihad Jeddah (Saudi Arabia)	2–1	(Morocco) Olympic Safi	1–1	1–0
Al-Ittihad Alexandria (Egypt)	0–1	(Egypt) Ismaily	0–1	0–0
MC Alger (Algeria)	2–2 (a)	(Morocco) Raja Casablanca	1–2	1–0

=== Semi-finals ===
The draw for the semi-finals was held on 4 December 2019 (after the quarter-finals draw).

Team 1	Agg.	Team 2	1st leg	2nd leg
Al-Shabab (Saudi Arabia)	3–4	(Saudi Arabia) Al-Ittihad Jeddah	2–2	1–2
Ismaily (Egypt)	1–3	(Morocco) Raja Casablanca	1–0	0–3

=== Final ===
The final was played on 21 August 2021 at the Prince Moulay Abdellah Stadium in Rabat, Morocco. The "home" team (for administrative purposes) was determined by an additional draw held after the quarter-final and semi-final draws.

21 August 2021
21:00 WAT (UTC+1)

Al-Ittihad Jeddah (Saudi Arabia)	4–4	(Morocco) Raja CA
Bruno Henrique 4'; Romarinho 28' (pen.), 53', 64' (pen.)	Report	Haddad 5'; Benhalib 13'; El Wardi 37'; S. Rahimi 50'
Penalties
Bruno Henrique (penalty missed); Romarinho (penalty scored); Coronado (penalty scored); Al-Muwallad (penalty missed); Al-Malki (penalty scored)	3–4	(penalty scored) S. Rahimi; (penalty scored) Zrida; (penalty missed) Madkour; (penalty scored) Hafidi; (penalty scored) Arjoune

Prince Moulay Abdellah Stadium, Rabat
Attendance: 0 (closed doors)
Referee: Mahmoud El Banna (Egypt)

== Top goalscorers ==
Statistics exclude preliminary round.

Team eliminated / inactive for this round.

Rank	Player	Team	FR1	FR2	SR1	SR2	QF1	QF2	SF1	SF2	F	Total
1	(Brazil) Romarinho	(Saudi Arabia) Al-Ittihad Jeddah	1		2	1		1	1	1	3	10
2	(Morocco) Mouhcine Moutouali	(Morocco) Raja Casablanca	1			2	1			1		5
3	(Colombia) Danilo Asprilla	(Saudi Arabia) Al-Shabab	1				3					4
3	(Egypt) Khaled Kamar	(Egypt) Al-Ittihad Alexandria	1	1	1	1						4
5	(Democratic Republic of the Congo) Ben Malango	(Morocco) Raja Casablanca				1	1			1		3
5	(Serbia) Aleksandar Prijović	(Saudi Arabia) Al-Ittihad Jeddah	1			1				1		3
5	(Iraq) Amjad Attwan	(Iraq) Al-Shorta				3						3
5	(United Arab Emirates) Zaid Al-Ameri	(United Arab Emirates) Al-Jazira	1	2								3
5	(Brazil) Sebá	(Saudi Arabia) Al-Shabab	1				2					3
5	(Argentina) Cristian Guanca	(Saudi Arabia) Al-Shabab					1	1	1			3
11	(Egypt) Wagih Abdel Hakim	(Egypt) Ismaily	2									2
11	(Sudan) Waleed Bakhet	(Sudan) Al-Hilal		2								2
11	(Ivory Coast) Koffi Boua	(Morocco) Olympic Safi	1	1								2
11	(Algeria) Samy Frioui	(Algeria) MC Alger					1	1				2
11	(Saudi Arabia) Abdullah Al-Hamdan	(Saudi Arabia) Al-Shabab	1	1								2
11	(Tunisia) Taha Yassine Khenissi	(Tunisia) Espérance de Tunis		2								2
11	(Brazil) Fábio Lima	(United Arab Emirates) Al-Wasl	1	1								2
11	(Democratic Republic of the Congo) Junior Mapuku	(Iraq) Al-Shorta		2								2
11	(Morocco) Mohamed Nahiri	(Morocco) Wydad Casablanca	1			1						2
11	(Democratic Republic of the Congo) Fabrice Ngoma	(Morocco) Raja Casablanca		1	1							2
11	(Namibia) Benson Shilongo	(Egypt) Ismaily			2							2
11	(Iraq) Nabeel Sabah	(Iraq) Al-Shorta				2						2
11	(Morocco) Mahmoud Benhalib	(Morocco) Raja Casablanca								1	1	2

== Broadcasting ==
2019–20 Mohammed VI Champions Cup Media Coverage
Country/Region	Television Channel
Middle East and North Africa	AD Sports
