= Amin Omar =

Egyptian football referee

Amin Mohamed Omar
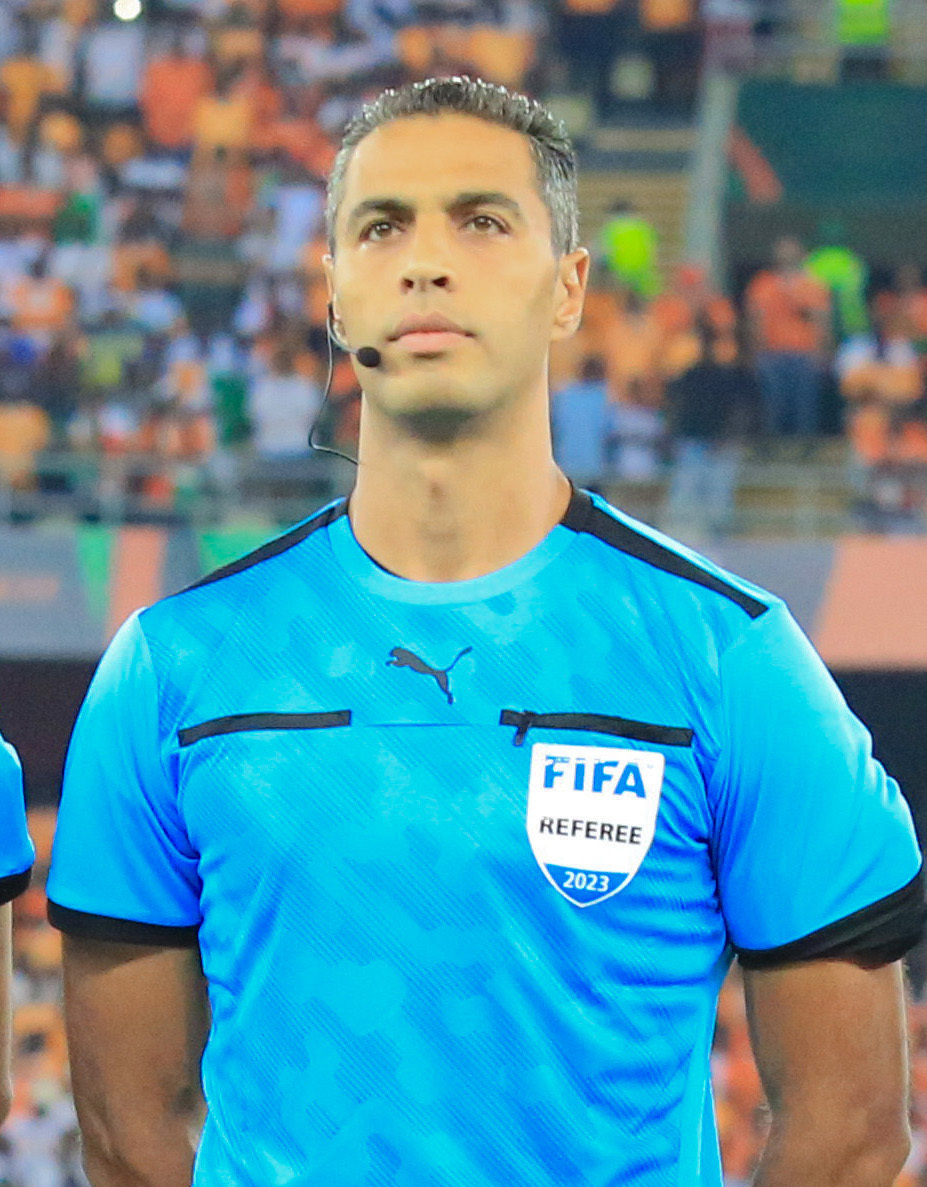
- Omar in 2024
- Full name: Amin Mohamed Omar
- Born: September 25, 1985 (age 41); Egypt
- Other occupation: Lawyer

Domestic
Years	League	Role
2013–	Egyptian Premier League	Referee

International
Years	League	Role
2017–	FIFA listed	Referee

Amin Mohamed Omar (Arabic: أمين محمد عمر) is an Egyptian football referee. He became a FIFA referee in 2017.

Omar made his first appearance as a referee in the Egyptian Premier League in 2013. In 2019, he was selected to officiate at the 2019 FIFA U-17 World Cup in Brazil. He is a referee at the 2026 FIFA World Cup.

== Selected performances ==
2026 FIFA World Cup
Date	Match	Venue	Round	Attendance
11 June 2026	South Korea vs Czech Republic	Estadio Akron, Zapopan	Group stage	44,985
22 June 2026	Argentina vs Austria	AT&T Stadium, Arlington	Group stage	70,649
