= 2017–18 Wydad AC season =

Wydad AC
2017–18 season
- President: Saïd Naciri
- manager: Hussein Amotta (until 9 January 2018); Faouzi Benzarti (from 18 January 2018)
- Stadium: Stade Mohamed V
- Botola: Runners–up
- Throne Cup: Round of 16
- Champions League: 2017: Winners; 2018: Quarter-finals
- Club World Cup: Fifth place
- CAF Super Cup: Winners
- Top goalscorer: League: Mohamed Nahiri (9 goals); All: Mohamed Nahiri (10 goals); Ismail El Haddad (10 goals)

The 2017–18 season is Wydad AC's 78th season in their existence and the club's 62nd consecutive season in the top flight of Moroccan football. They have competed in the Botola, the 2017 CAF Champions League, the 2018 CAF Champions League and the Throne Cup.

== Squad list ==
Players and squad numbers last updated on 10 September 2017.
Note: Flags indicate national team as has been defined under FIFA eligibility rules. Players may hold more than one non-FIFA nationality.

| No. | Nat. | Position | Name | Date of birth (age) | Signed from |
Goalkeepers
| 1 | (Morocco) | GK | Yassine El Kharroubi | 29 March 1990 (aged 27) | (Bulgaria) Lokomotiv Plovdiv |
| 12 | (Morocco) | GK | Badreddine Benachour | 8 September 1994 (aged 23) | (Morocco) Youth system |
| 22 | (Morocco) | GK | Zouhair Laaroubi | 30 July 1984 (aged 33) | (Morocco) Difaâ Hassani El Jadidi |
Defenders
| 16 | (Morocco) | CB | Naïm Aarab | 7 February 1988 (aged 29) | (Belgium) Sint-Truidense |
| 13 | (Morocco) | CB | Youssef Rabeh | 13 April 1985 (aged 32) | (Morocco) Moghreb Tétouan |
| 5 | (Morocco) | CB | Amine Atouchi | 7 January 1992 (aged 25) | (Morocco) Youth system |
| 25 | (Burkina Faso) | CB / LB | Mohamed Ouattara | 7 March 1993 (aged 24) | (Burkina Faso) Étoile Filante |
| 29 | (Ivory Coast) | CB | Cheick Comara | 14 October 1993 (aged 23) | (Finland) Ekenäs IF |
| | (Morocco) | CB | Achraf Dari | 6 May 1999 (aged 18) | (Morocco) Youth system |
| 15 | (Morocco) | CB / LB | Abdelhamid El Kaoutari | 17 March 1990 (aged 27) | (Italy) Palermo |
| 28 | (Morocco) | RB / LB | Abdelatif Noussir | 20 February 1990 (aged 27) | (Morocco) MAS Fes |
| 30 | (Morocco) | CB / RB / DM | Mohamed Nahiri | 22 October 1991 (aged 25) | (Morocco) FUS Rabat |
| 27 | (Morocco) | RB / LB | Zakaria El Hachimi | 4 August 1987 (aged 30) | (Morocco) Raja Casablanca |
| 3 | (Morocco) | LB | Fahd Aktaou | 13 January 1993 (aged 24) | (Netherlands) Heracles Almelo |
| 8 | (Morocco) | LB | Badr Gaddarine | 20 October 1997 (aged 19) | (Morocco) Youth system |
Midfielders
| 24 | (Morocco) | DM | Jamel Aït Ben Idir | 10 January 1984 (aged 33) | (France) AJ Auxerre |
| 6 | (Morocco) | DM / RB | Brahim Nekkach | 15 February 1982 (aged 35) | (Morocco) Difaâ Hassani El Jadidi |
| 4 | (Morocco) | DM / CB / CM | Salaheddine Saidi | 6 February 1987 (aged 30) | (United Arab Emirates) Dubai CSC |
| 14 | (Morocco) | CM | Faycal Haddadi | 24 April 1996 (aged 21) | (Morocco) TAS de Casablanca |
| 2 | (Morocco) | DM | Anas El Asbahi | 15 October 1993 (aged 23) | (Morocco) Raja Casablanca |
| 11 | (Morocco) | LW | Ismail El Haddad | 3 August 1990 (aged 27) | (Morocco) Hassania Agadir |
| 19 | (Morocco) | RW | Amin Tighazoui | 20 April 1989 (aged 28) | (Morocco) OC Khouribga |
| 26 | (Morocco) | RW | Abdeladim Khadrouf | 3 January 1985 (aged 32) | (Morocco) Moghreb Tétouan |
| 21 | (Morocco) | AM | Rachid Housni | 2 May 1990 (aged 27) | (Morocco) Chabab Rif Al Hoceima |
| 10 | (Morocco) | CM / AM | Walid El Karti | 23 July 1994 (aged 23) | (Morocco) OC Khouribga |
| 19 | (Ghana) | AM | Daniel Nii Adjei | 29 September 1988 (aged 28) | (Democratic Republic of the Congo) TP Mazembe |
Forwards
| | (Ivory Coast) | | Guillaume Nicaise Daho | 20 December 1994 (aged 22) | (Ivory Coast) Africa Sports |
| 23 | (Nigeria) | | Chisom Chikatara | 24 November 1994 (aged 22) | (Nigeria) Abia Warriors |
| 7 | (Morocco) | RW | Mohamed Ounajem | 4 January 1992 (aged 25) | (Morocco) Chabab Atlas Khénifra |
| 25 | (Argentina) | | Alejandro Quintana | 20 February 1992 (aged 25) | (Bolivia) Club Blooming |
| 9 | (Morocco) | | Mohammed Aoulad | 29 August 1991 (aged 26) | (Belgium) Union Saint-Gilloise |
| 20 | (Morocco) | | Ayman El Hassouni | 22 February 1995 (aged 22) | (Morocco) Youth system |
| | (Morocco) | | Hicham Massaki | 6 August 1998 (aged 19) | (Morocco) Youth system |
| 17 | (Morocco) | | Achraf Bencharki | 24 September 1994 (aged 22) | (Morocco) Maghreb de Fès |
| 37 | (Morocco) | RW | Reda Hajhouj | 2 July 1994 (aged 23) | (Morocco) Youth system |

== Competitions ==
=== Overview ===
| Competition | Record | | | | | | | | Started round | Final position / round | First match | Last match |
| Competition | G | W | D | L | GF | GA | GD | Win % | Started round | Final position / round | First match | Last match |
|---|---|---|---|---|---|---|---|---|---|---|---|---|
| Botola Pro | 30 | 14 | 9 | 7 | 44 | 26 | +18 | 46.67 | —N/a | Runners–up | 10 September 2017 | 20 May 2018 |
| Throne Cup | 4 | 2 | 1 | 1 | 5 | 3 | +2 | 50.00 | Round of 32 | Round of 16 | 23 August 2017 | 12 October 2017 |
| 2017 Champions League | 6 | 3 | 2 | 1 | 6 | 3 | +3 | 50.00 | Group stage | Winners | 17 September 2017 | 4 November 2017 |
| FIFA Club World Cup | 2 | 0 | 0 | 2 | 2 | 4 | −2 | 0.00 | Second round | Fifth place | 9 December 2017 | 12 December 2017 |
| CAF Super Cup | 1 | 1 | 0 | 0 | 1 | 0 | +1 | 100.00 | Final | Winners | 24 February 2018 | |
| 2018 Champions League | 4 | 2 | 1 | 1 | 11 | 5 | +6 | 50.00 | First round | Group stage | 7 March 2018 | 15 May 2018 |
| Total | 47 | 22 | 13 | 12 | 69 | 41 | +28 | 46.81 | | | | |

Updated to match played 7 March 2020
Source: Competitions

=== Botola Pro ===
==== League table ====
| Pos | Team | Pld | W | D | L | GF | GA | GD | Pts | Qualification or relegation |
|---|---|---|---|---|---|---|---|---|---|---|
| 1 | IR Tanger (C) | 30 | 14 | 10 | 6 | 34 | 23 | +11 | 52 | Qualification for the CAF Champions League |
| 2 | Wydad Casablanca | 30 | 14 | 9 | 7 | 44 | 26 | +18 | 51 (Note: Wydad Casablanca finished ahead of Hassania Agadir on goals scored: Wydad Casablanca 44, hassania Agadir 40) | Qualification for the CAF Champions League |
| 3 | Hassania Agadir | 30 | 13 | 12 | 5 | 40 | 22 | +18 | 51 | Qualification for the CAF Confederation Cup |
| 4 | FUS Rabat | 30 | 13 | 10 | 7 | 34 | 26 | +8 | 49 | |
| 5 | Difaâ El Jadidi | 30 | 13 | 9 | 8 | 49 | 33 | +16 | 48 (Note: Difaa Jadidi finished ahead of Raja Casablanca on head-to-head goal difference: Difaa Jadidi 2–1 Raja Casablanca, Raja Casablanca 3–2 Difaa Jadidi) | |

Source: frmf.ma
Rules for classification: 1) Points; 2) Head-to-head points; 3) Head-to-head goal difference; 4) Goal difference; 5) Goals scored; 6) Fair-play points; 7) Play-off.
(C) Champions

==== Results summary ====
| Overall | | | | | | | | Home | | | | | | Away | | | | | |
| Pld | W | D | L | GF | GA | GD | Pts | W | D | L | GF | GA | GD | W | D | L | GF | GA | GD |
|---|---|---|---|---|---|---|---|---|---|---|---|---|---|---|---|---|---|---|---|
| 30 | 14 | 9 | 7 | 44 | 26 | +18 | 51 | 9 | 2 | 4 | 26 | 15 | +11 | 5 | 7 | 3 | 18 | 11 | +7 |

Last updated: 24 September 2017.
Source: Competitive matches

=== Results by round ===
| Round | 1 | 2 | 3 | 4 | 5 | 6 | 7 | 8 | 9 | 10 | 11 | 12 | 13 | 14 | 15 | 16 | 17 | 18 | 19 | 20 | 21 | 22 | 23 | 24 | 25 | 26 | 27 | 28 | 29 | 30 |
|---|---|---|---|---|---|---|---|---|---|---|---|---|---|---|---|---|---|---|---|---|---|---|---|---|---|---|---|---|---|---|
| Ground | H | A | A | H | A | H | A | H | A | H | A | H | A | H | A | A | H | H | A | H | A | H | A | H | A | H | A | H | A | H |
| Result | L | D | D | W | W | W | L | D | W | L | L | L | L | L | D | W | W | W | W | D | D | W | W | W | D | W | D | W | D | W |
| Position | 15 | 13 | 12 | 10 | 5 | 4 | 6 | 7 | 4 | 6 | 7 | 10 | 12 | 13 | 12 | 11 | 9 | 7 | 5 | 6 | 7 | 6 | 5 | 3 | 3 | 2 | 4 | 2 | 3 | 2 |

Source: Competitive matches
A = Away; H = Home; W = Win; D = Draw; L = Loss

==== Matches ====
| 10 September 2017 1 | Wydad AC | 1–3 | FUS Rabat | Casablanca |
| 21:30 | Atouchi 38' | | El Bahraoui 5'; El Aroui 47'; Diakité 62' | Stadium: Stade Mohamed V Referee: Hassan Rahmani |

| 10 November 2017 2 | Rapide Oued Zem | 1–1 | Wydad AC | Kasba Tadla |
| 16:00 | Safsafi 30' | | Daho 20' | Stadium: Stade Municipal de Tadla; Referee: Samir Guezzaz |

| 15 November 2017 3 | FAR de Rabat | 0–0 | Wydad AC | Rabat |
| 18:00 | | | | Stadium: Stade Moulay Abdellah |

| 19 November 2017 8 | Wydad AC | 0–0 | Racing de Casablanca | Rabat |
| 20:00 | | | | Stadium: Stade Moulay Abdellah; Referee: Karim Sabri |

| 22 November 2017 4 | Wydad AC | 2–1 | Difaâ El Jadidi | Casablanca |
| 18:00 | Khadrouf 37' (pen.); Comara 52' | | Msuva 65' | Stadium: Stade Mohamed V Referee: Redouane Jiyed |

| 26 November 2017 9 | Olympique Khouribga | 0–5 | Wydad AC | Khouribga |
| 16:00 | | | Aoulad 8', 24' (pen.); El Karti 46'; Tighazoui 53' (pen.); Noussir 73' | Stadium: Complexe OCP; Referee: Abderrahim Yaacoubi |

| 29 November 2017 5 | Moghreb Tétouan | 1–2 | Wydad AC | Tétouan |
| 16:00 | Ismaili 26' | | Aoulad 13', 45+2' | Stadium: Stade Saniat Rmel; Referee: Adil Zourak |

| 18 December 2017 12 | Wydad AC | 0–1 | IR Tanger | Rabat |
| 16:00 | | | Naghmi 57' | Stadium: Stade Moulay Abdellah; Referee: Youssef Haraoui |

| 21 December 2017 6 | Wydad AC | 1–0 | Chabab Rif Al Hoceima | Casablanca |
| 16:00 | El Haddad 90+5' | | | Stadium: Stade Mohamed V Referee: Redouane Jiyed |

| 25 December 2017 13 | Hassania Agadir | 1–0 | Wydad AC | Agadir |
| 19:00 | Daoudi 26' (pen.) | | | Stadium: Stade Adrar; Referee: Samir Guezzaz |

| 28 December 2017 14 | Wydad AC | 0–1 | Olympic Safi | Rabat |
| 16:00 | | | Attiatallah 23' | Stadium: Complexe Sportif Moulay Abdallah; Referee: Hicham Tiazi |

| 31 December 2017 15 | Chabab Atlas Khénifra | 0–0 | Wydad AC | Khénifra |
| 16:00 | | | | Stadium: Stade Municipal de Khenifra; Referee: Abderrahim El Yaakoubi |

| 4 January 2018 7 | RSB Berkane | 2–1 | Wydad AC | Oujda |
| 15:30 | Hilali 13' (pen.); Laachir 77' | | Daho 32' | Stadium: Stade d'Honneur D'oujda; Referee: Adil Zaourak |

| 8 January 2018 11 | Kawkab Marrakesh | 2–1 | Wydad AC | Marrakesh |
| 20:00 | El Haki 22'; El Baraka 89' | | Daho 16' | Stadium: Marrakesh Stadium; Referee: Taoufik Gourar |

| 10 February 2018 10 | Wydad AC | 1–2 | Raja Casablanca | Casablanca |
| 16:00 | Boutayeb 20' (o.g.) | | Iajour 33'; Benoun 88' | Stadium: Stade Mohamed V Referee: Noureddine Jaafari |

| 14 February 2018 16 | FUS Rabat | 2–4 | Wydad AC | Rabat |
| | Anouar 37', 89' (pen.) | | Nahiri 1', 82'; Amsif 68' (o.g.); El Haddad 73' | Stadium: Stade Moulay Hassan; Referee: Redoane Jiyed |

| 18 February 2018 17 | Wydad AC | 3–1 | Rapide Oued Zem | Casablanca |
| | Tighazoui 45'; Noussir 68'; Quintana 88' | | Diarra 54' | Stadium: Stade Mohamed V Referee: Abderrahim El Yaakoubi |

| 28 February 2018 18 | Wydad AC | 3–1 | FAR de Rabat | Casablanca |
| | El Haddad 10'; Nahiri 17'; Tighazoui 40' | | Ijroten 40' | Stadium: Stade Mohamed V |

| 4 March 2018 19 | Difaâ El Jadidi | 0–1 | Wydad AC | El Jadida |
| | | | Chikatara 79' | Stadium: Stade El Abdi; Referee: Samir Guezzaz |

| 11 March 2018 20 | Wydad AC | 0–0 | Moghreb Tétouan | Casablanca |
| | | | | Stadium: Stade Mohamed V Referee: Mohamed Nhayeh |

| 29 March 2018 21 | Chabab Rif Al Hoceima | 0–0 | Wydad AC | Al Hoceima |
| | | | | Stadium: Stade Mimoun Al Arsi |

| 25 April 2018 22 | Wydad AC | 2–1 | RSB Berkane | Casablanca |
| 20:30 | Noussir 6'; Atouchi 84' | | El Kaabi 35' | Stadium: Stade Mohamed V Referee: Hicham Tiazi |

| 2 April 2018 23 | Racing de Casablanca | 0–1 | Wydad AC | Casablanca |
| | | | Aarab 73' | Stadium: Stade Père-Jégo; Referee: Jalal Jiyed |

| 8 April 2018 24 | Wydad AC | 5–2 | Olympique Khouribga | Casablanca |
| 21:00 | Nahiri 11'; Ounajem 41'; Quintana 47'; El Haddad 85'; Atouchi 89' (pen.) | | El Moutaraji 21', 35' | Stadium: Stade Mohamed V Referee: Taoufik Gourar |

| 14 April 2018 25 | Raja Casablanca | 1–1 | Wydad AC | Casablanca |
| | Benoun 88' | | Atouchi 38' | Stadium: Stade Mohamed V Referee: Redouane Jiyed |

| 21 April 2018 26 | Wydad AC | 4–1 | Kawkab Marrakesh | Casablanca |
| | Tighazoui 43'; Nahiri 48', 90+4'; Ounajem 88' | | Amimi 89' | Stadium: Stade Mohamed V Referee: Samir Guezzaz |

| 29 April 2018 27 | IR Tanger | 0–0 | Wydad AC | Tanger |
| 17:00 | | | | Stadium: Stade Marshan; Referee: Abderrahim Yaacoubi |

| 9 May 2018 28 | Wydad AC | 1–0 | Hassania Agadir | Casablanca |
| 21:00 | Nahiri 82' | | | Stadium: Stade Mohamed V Referee: Adil Zourak |

| 12 May 2018 29 | Olympic Safi | 1–1 | Wydad AC | Safi |
| 20:00 | Edjomariegwe 62' | | El Haddad 83' | Stadium: Stade El Massira; Referee: Hicham Tiazi |

| 20 May 2018 30 | Wydad AC | 3–1 | Chabab Atlas Khénifra | Casablanca |
| | Tighazoui 25' (pen.), 60'; Nahiri 70' | | Laâroubi 79' (o.g.) | Stadium: Stade Mohamed V Referee: Taoufik Gourar |

== Moroccan Throne Cup ==
| 23 August 2017 R32 1st leg | Kawkab Marrakech | 0–1 | Wydad AC | Marrakesh |
| 22:00 | | | Bencharki 53' | Stadium: Marrakesh Stadium |

| 27 August 2017 R32 2nd leg | Wydad AC | 2–0 (3–0 agg.) | Kawkab Marrakech | Casablanca |
| 21:00 | El Asbahi 51'; Atouchi 62' | | | Stadium: Stade Mohammed V Referee: Redouane Jiyed |

| 3 October 2017 R16 1st leg | Wydad AC | 1–1 | RSB Berkane | Casablanca |
| 21:00 | Khadrouf 90+9' | | El Kaabi 56' | Stadium: Stade Mohammed V Referee: Samir Guezzaz |

| 12 October 2017 R16 2nd leg | RSB Berkane | 2–1 (3–2 agg.) | Wydad AC | Oujda |
| 16:00 | Fo-Doh Laba 41' (pen.); Namsaoui 89' | | Aoulad 34' (pen.) | Stadium: Stade d'Honneur D'oujda; Referee: Redouane Jiyed |

== 2017 CAF Champions League ==
=== knockout stage ===
==== Quarter-finals ====
| 17 September 2017 First leg | Mamelodi Sundowns (South Africa) | 1–0 | (Morocco) Wydad AC | Pretoria |
| 15:00 UTC+2 | Zakri 71' | Report | | Stadium: Lucas Masterpieces Moripe Stadium; Referee: Bamlak Tessema Weyesa (Ethiopia) |

| 23 September 2017 Second leg | Wydad AC (Morocco) | 1–0 (3–2 p) | (South Africa) Mamelodi Sundowns | Rabat |
| 21:00 UTC+1 | Saidi 26' | Report | | Stadium: Prince Moulay Abdellah Stadium; Referee: Ali Lemghaifry (Mauritania) |
| | Penalties |
| | Atouchi (penalty missed); Khadrouf (penalty scored); Bencharki (penalty scored); Ounajem (penalty scored) | | (penalty scored) Lebese; (penalty missed) Tau; (penalty scored) Madisha; (penalty missed) Zakri; (penalty missed) Bangaly |

==== Semi-finals ====
| 29 September 2017 First leg | USM Alger (Algeria) | 0–0 | (Morocco) Wydad AC | Algiers |
| 18:00 UTC+1 | | Report | | Stadium: Stade du 5 Juillet; Referee: Sidi Alioum (Cameroon) |

| 21 October 2017 Second leg | Wydad AC (Morocco) | 3–1 (3–1 agg.) | (Algeria) USM Alger | Casablanca |
| 20:00 UTC+1 | El Karti 26'; Bencharki 54', 90+3' | Report | Abdellaoui 67' | Stadium: Stade Mohammed V Referee: Malang Diedhiou (Senegal) |

==== Final ====
| 28 October 2017 First leg | Al-Ahly (Egypt) | 1–1 | (Morocco) Wydad AC | Alexandria |
| 19:00 UTC+2 | Zakaria 3' | Report | Bencharki 16' | Stadium: Borg El Arab Stadium; Referee: Bamlak Tessema Weyesa (Ethiopia) |

| 4 November 2017 Second leg | Wydad AC (Morocco) | 1–0 (2–1 agg.) | (Egypt) Al-Ahly | Casablanca |
| 20:00 UTC+0 | El Karti 69' | Report | | Stadium: Stade Mohammed V Referee: Bakary Gassama (Gambia) |

== FIFA Club World Cup ==
| 9 December 2017 Second round | Pachuca (Mexico) | 1–0 (a.e.t.) | (Morocco) Wydad AC | Abu Dhabi |
| 17:00 UTC+4 | Guzmán 112' | Report | | Stadium: Zayed Sports City Stadium; Attendance: 12,488; Referee: Ravshan Irmatov (Uzbekistan) |

| 12 December 2017 Fifth place | Wydad AC (Morocco) | 2–3 | (Japan) Urawa Red Diamonds | Al Ain |
| 18:00 UTC+4 | Haddad 21'; Hajhouj 90+4' (pen.) | Report | Maurício 18', 60'; Kashiwagi 26' | Stadium: Hazza bin Zayed Stadium; Attendance: 4,281; Referee: Matt Conger (New Zealand) |

== CAF Super Cup ==
| 24 February 2018 | Wydad AC (Morocco) | 1–0 | (Democratic Republic of the Congo) TP Mazembe | Casablanca |
| 16:30 UTC+0 | Tighazoui 83' | Report | | Stadium: Stade Mohammed V Attendance: 45,000; Referee: Janny Sikazwe (Zambia) |

== 2018 CAF Champions League ==
=== First round ===
| 7 March 2018 First leg | Wydad AC (Morocco) | 7–2 | (Ivory Coast) Williamsville AC | Casablanca |
| 18:00 UTC+0 | Aoulad 6'; Tighazoui 16', 62'; Nahiri 52'; Haddad 74', 89', 90' | Report | J.-W. N'da 2'; J.-F. N'da 37' | Stadium: Stade Mohammed V Referee: Eric Otogo-Castane (Gabon) |

| 17 March 2018 Second leg | Williamsville AC (Ivory Coast) | 2–0 (4–7 agg.) | (Morocco) Wydad AC | Abidjan |
| 16:00 UTC+0 | Kouassi 39' (pen.), 83' (pen.) | Report | | Stadium: Stade Robert Champroux; Referee: Daniel Laryea (Ghana) |

=== Group stage ===
==== Group C ====
| Pos | Team | Pld | W | D | L | GF | GA | GD | Pts | Qualification | WAC | HOR | MSD | TGP |
|---|---|---|---|---|---|---|---|---|---|---|---|---|---|---|
| 1 | (Morocco) Wydad AC | 6 | 3 | 3 | 0 | 8 | 2 | +6 | 12 | Quarter-finals | — | 2–0 | 1–0 | 3–0 |
| 2 | (Guinea) Horoya | 6 | 2 | 3 | 1 | 7 | 7 | 0 | 9 | Quarter-finals | 1–1 | — | 2–2 | 2–1 |
| 3 | (South Africa) Mamelodi Sundowns | 6 | 1 | 3 | 2 | 5 | 6 | −1 | 6 | | 1–1 | 0–0 | — | 2–1 |
| 4 | AS Togo-Port | 6 | 1 | 1 | 4 | 4 | 9 | −5 | 4 | | 0–0 | 1–2 | 1–0 | — |

Source: CAF

| 5 May 2018 Matchday 1 | Mamelodi Sundowns (South Africa) | 1–1 | (Morocco) Wydad AC | Pretoria |
| 21:00 UTC+2 | Vilakazi 3' | Report | Haddad 20' | Stadium: Lucas Masterpieces Moripe Stadium; Referee: Sidi Alioum (Cameroon) |

| 15 May 2018 Matchday 2 | Wydad AC (Morocco) | 3–0 | AS Togo-Port | Casablanca |
| 19:00 UTC+0 | Ounajem 2'; Aarab 6'; Nahiri 56' | Report | | Stadium: Stade Mohammed V Referee: Bernard Camille (Seychelles) |

== Squad information ==
=== Playing statistics ===
| No. | Pos | Nat | Player | Total | | Botola | | Throne Cup | | Champions League | | Other (Note: Includes the CAF Super Cup and FIFA Club World Cup) | |
| No. | Pos | Nat | Player | Apps | Goals | Apps | Goals | Apps | Goals | Apps | Goals | Apps | Goals |
Goalkeepers
| 1 | GK | (Morocco) MAR | Yassine El Kharroubi | 6 | 0 | 6 | 0 | 0 | 0 | 0 | 0 | 0 | 0 |
| 22 | GK | (Morocco) MAR | Zouhair Laaroubi | 24 | 0 | 21 | 0 | 1 | 0 | 0 | 0 | 2 | 0 |
| 12 | GK | (Morocco) MAR | Badreddine Benachour | 6 | 0 | 3 | 0 | 2 | 0 | 0 | 0 | 1 | 0 |
Defenders
| 16 | DF | (Morocco) MAR | Naïm Aarab | 10 | 1 | 8 | 1 | 1 | 0 | 0 | 0 | 1 | 0 |
| 13 | DF | (Morocco) MAR | Youssef Rabeh | 10 | 0 | 9 | 0 | 0 | 0 | 0 | 0 | 1 | 0 |
| 5 | DF | (Morocco) MAR | Amine Atouchi | 28 | 5 | 22 | 4 | 4 | 1 | 0 | 0 | 2 | 0 |
| 29 | DF | (Ivory Coast) CIV | Cheick Comara | 25 | 1 | 21 | 1 | 2 | 0 | 0 | 0 | 2 | 0 |
| | DF | (Morocco) MAR | Achraf Dari | 3 | 0 | 3 | 0 | 0 | 0 | 0 | 0 | 0 | 0 |
| 15 | DF | (Morocco) MAR | Abdelhamid El Kaoutari | 4 | 0 | 4 | 0 | 0 | 0 | 0 | 0 | 0 | 0 |
| 28 | DF | (Morocco) MAR | Abdelatif Noussir | 30 | 3 | 26 | 3 | 2 | 0 | 0 | 0 | 2 | 0 |
| 30 | DF | (Morocco) MAR | Mohamed Nahiri | 24 | 8 | 22 | 8 | 0 | 0 | 0 | 0 | 2 | 0 |
| 27 | DF | (Morocco) MAR | Zakaria El Hachimi | 15 | 0 | 13 | 0 | 1 | 0 | 0 | 0 | 1 | 0 |
| 8 | DF | (Morocco) MAR | Badr Gaddarine | 9 | 0 | 7 | 0 | 1 | 0 | 0 | 0 | 1 | 0 |
Midfielders
| 24 | MF | (Morocco) MAR | Jamel Aït Ben Idir | 7 | 0 | 5 | 0 | 1 | 0 | 0 | 0 | 1 | 0 |
| 6 | MF | (Morocco) MAR | Brahim Nekkach | 27 | 0 | 22 | 0 | 3 | 0 | 0 | 0 | 2 | 0 |
| 4 | MF | (Morocco) MAR | Salaheddine Saidi | 30 | 0 | 27 | 0 | 0 | 0 | 0 | 0 | 3 | 0 |
| 14 | MF | (Morocco) MAR | Faycal Haddadi | 0 | 0 | 0 | 0 | 0 | 0 | 0 | 0 | 0 | 0 |
| 2 | MF | (Morocco) MAR | Anas El Asbahi | 5 | 1 | 4 | 0 | 1 | 1 | 0 | 0 | 0 | 0 |
| 11 | MF | (Morocco) MAR | Ismail Haddad | 25 | 6 | 22 | 5 | 0 | 0 | 0 | 0 | 3 | 1 |
| 19 | MF | (Morocco) MAR | Amin Tighazoui | 31 | 7 | 28 | 6 | 1 | 0 | 0 | 0 | 2 | 1 |
| 21 | MF | (Morocco) MAR | Rachid Housni | 12 | 0 | 10 | 0 | 2 | 0 | 0 | 0 | 0 | 0 |
| 10 | MF | (Morocco) MAR | Walid El Karti | 28 | 1 | 23 | 1 | 2 | 0 | 0 | 0 | 3 | 0 |
| 19 | DF | (Ghana) GHA | Daniel Nii Adjei | 1 | 0 | 1 | 0 | 0 | 0 | 0 | 0 | 0 | 0 |
Forwards
| 23 | FW | (Nigeria) NGA | Chisom Chikatara | 5 | 1 | 4 | 1 | 0 | 0 | 0 | 0 | 1 | 0 |
| 7 | FW | (Morocco) MAR | Mohamed Ounajem | 15 | 2 | 14 | 2 | 1 | 0 | 0 | 0 | 0 | 0 |
| 25 | FW | (Argentina) ARG | Alejandro Quintana | 14 | 2 | 13 | 2 | 0 | 0 | 0 | 0 | 1 | 0 |
| 9 | FW | (Morocco) MAR | Mohammed Aoulad | 20 | 5 | 16 | 4 | 2 | 1 | 0 | 0 | 2 | 0 |
| 20 | FW | (Morocco) MAR | Ayman El Hassouni | 14 | 0 | 13 | 0 | 0 | 0 | 0 | 0 | 1 | 0 |
| | FW | (Morocco) MAR | Hicham Massaki | 1 | 0 | 1 | 0 | 0 | 0 | 0 | 0 | 0 | 0 |
Players transferred out during the season
| 25 | DF | (Burkina Faso) BFA | Mohamed Ouattara | 5 | 0 | 2 | 0 | 2 | 0 | 0 | 0 | 1 | 0 |
| 26 | MF | (Morocco) MAR | Abdeladim Khadrouf | 16 | 2 | 11 | 1 | 3 | 1 | 0 | 0 | 2 | 0 |
| 17 | FW | (Morocco) MAR | Achraf Bencharki | 8 | 1 | 5 | 0 | 2 | 1 | 0 | 0 | 1 | 0 |
| | FW | (Ivory Coast) CIV | Guillaume Nicaise Daho | 15 | 3 | 12 | 3 | 2 | 0 | 0 | 0 | 1 | 0 |
| 37 | FW | (Morocco) MAR | Reda Hajhouj | 13 | 1 | 9 | 0 | 2 | 0 | 0 | 0 | 2 | 1 |

Last updated: 8 June 2019

=== Goalscorers ===
Includes all competitive matches. The list is sorted alphabetically by surname when total goals are equal.

| No. | Nat. | Player | Pos. | B 1 | TC | CL 1 | CWC | SC | TOTAL |
|---|---|---|---|---|---|---|---|---|---|
| 30 | (Morocco) | Mohamed Nahiri | DF | 8 | 0 | 2 | 0 | 0 | 10 |
| 11 | (Morocco) | Ismail Haddad | MF | 5 | 0 | 4 | 1 | 0 | 10 |
| 19 | (Morocco) | Amin Tighazoui | MF | 6 | 0 | 2 | 0 | 1 | 9 |
| 9 | (Morocco) | Mohammed Aoulad | FW | 4 | 1 | 1 | 0 | 0 | 6 |
| 5 | (Morocco) | Amine Atouchi | DF | 4 | 1 | 0 | 0 | 0 | 5 |
| 17 | (Morocco) | Achraf Bencharki | FW | 0 | 1 | 3 | 0 | 0 | 4 |
| | (Ivory Coast) | Guillaume Nicaise Daho | FW | 3 | 0 | 0 | 0 | 0 | 3 |
| 28 | (Morocco) | Abdelatif Noussir | DF | 3 | 0 | 0 | 0 | 0 | 3 |
| 7 | (Morocco) | Mohamed Ounajem | FW | 2 | 0 | 1 | 0 | 0 | 3 |
| 10 | (Morocco) | Walid El Karti | MF | 1 | 0 | 2 | 0 | 0 | 3 |
| 25 | (Argentina) | Alejandro Quintana | FW | 2 | 0 | 0 | 0 | 0 | 2 |
| 26 | (Morocco) | Abdeladim Khadrouf | MF | 1 | 1 | 0 | 0 | 0 | 2 |
| 16 | (Morocco) | Naïm Aarab | DF | 1 | 0 | 1 | 0 | 0 | 2 |
| 23 | (Nigeria) | Chisom Chikatara | FW | 1 | 0 | 0 | 0 | 0 | 1 |
| 29 | (Ivory Coast) | Cheick Comara | DF | 1 | 0 | 0 | 0 | 0 | 1 |
| 37 | (Morocco) | Reda Hajhouj | FW | 0 | 0 | 0 | 1 | 0 | 1 |
| 2 | (Morocco) | Anas El Asbahi | MF | 0 | 1 | 0 | 0 | 0 | 1 |
| 4 | (Morocco) | Salaheddine Saidi | MF | 0 | 0 | 1 | 0 | 0 | 1 |
| Own Goals | | | | 2 | 0 | 0 | 0 | 0 | 2 |
| Totals | | | | 44 | 5 | 17 | 2 | 1 | 69 |

== Transfers ==
=== In ===
| Date | Pos | Player | From club | Transfer fee | Source |
|---|---|---|---|---|---|
| 12 July 2017 | DF | (Morocco) Zakaria El Hachimi | Raja Casablanca | Free transfer | |
| 28 July 2017 | FW | (Morocco) Mohammed Aoulad | (Belgium) Union Saint-Gilloise | Free transfer | |
| 29 July 2017 | GK | (Morocco) Yassine El Kharroubi | (Bulgaria) Lokomotiv Plovdiv | Free transfer | |
| 9 August 2017 | DF | (Ivory Coast) Cheick Comara | (Finland) Ekenäs IF | Undisclosed | |
| 12 August 2017 | DF | (Morocco) Mohamed Nahiri | FUS Rabat | 220,000 € | |
| 22 September 2017 | MF | (Morocco) Amin Tighazoui | OC Khouribga | 268,000 € | |
| 4 January 2018 | MF | (Ghana) Daniel Nii Adjei | (Democratic Republic of the Congo) TP Mazembe | Undisclosed | |
| 12 January 2018 | DF | (Morocco) Abdelhamid El Kaoutari | (Italy) Palermo | Undisclosed | |
| 16 January 2018 | FW | (Argentina) Alejandro Quintana | (Bolivia) Club Blooming | Undisclosed | |

=== Out ===
| Date | Pos | Player | To club | Transfer fee | Source |
|---|---|---|---|---|---|
| 14 January 2018 | FW | (Morocco) Reda Hajhouj | (Algeria) USM Alger | Free transfer | |
| 22 January 2018 | FW | (Morocco) Achraf Bencharki | (Saudi Arabia) Al-Hilal | 9,000,000 $ | |
