= 2017 FIFA Club World Cup squads =

Each team in the 2017 FIFA Club World Cup had to name a 23-man squad (three of whom must be goalkeepers). Injury replacements were allowed until 24 hours before the team's first match.

== Al Jazira ==
Manager: (Netherlands) Henk ten Cate

Note: Flags indicate national team as defined under FIFA eligibility rules; some limited exceptions apply. Players may hold more than one non-FIFA nationality.

No.	Pos.	Nation	Player
1	GK	UAE	Ali Khasif
3	DF	UAE	Salem Al-Eidi
4	DF	UAE	Mohammed Ali Ayed
5	DF	UAE	Musallem Fayez
6	DF	UAE	Saif Khalfan
7	FW	UAE	Ali Mabkhout
9	MF	UZB	Sardor Rashidov
10	MF	MAR	Mbark Boussoufa
12	DF	UAE	Salem Rashid Obaid
14	DF	UAE	Eisa Al-Otaibah
15	MF	UAE	Khalfan Mubarak
21	MF	UAE	Yaqoub Al Hosani

No.	Pos.	Nation	Player
27	DF	UAE	Salem Abdullah
31	FW	BRA	Romarinho
35	MF	EGY	Abdullah Ramadan
36	GK	OMA	Khaled Al-Senani
40	DF	UAE	Mohammed Al Attas
44	DF	UAE	Fares Juma Al Saadi
45	FW	UAE	Ahmed Rabee
51	DF	UAE	Khalifa Al Hammadi
56	GK	UAE	Abdurahman Al-Ameri
70	FW	UAE	Ahmed Al Attas
80	DF	UAE	Salem Ali Ibrahim

== Auckland City ==
Auckland City named their squad on 27 November 2017.

Manager: (Spain) Ramon Tribulietx

Note: Flags indicate national team as defined under FIFA eligibility rules; some limited exceptions apply. Players may hold more than one non-FIFA nationality.

No.	Pos.	Nation	Player
1	GK	ESP	Eñaut Zubikarai
2	DF	NZL	Liam Graham
3	DF	JPN	Takuya Iwata
4	MF	CRO	Mario Bilen
5	DF	ESP	Ángel Berlanga (captain)
6	MF	NZL	Te Atawhai Hudson-Wihongi
7	MF	NZL	Cameron Howieson
8	MF	ESP	Albert Riera
9	DF	ENG	Darren White
10	FW	NZL	Ryan De Vries
11	MF	MEX	Fabrizio Tavano
12	FW	NZL	Kris Bright

No.	Pos.	Nation	Player
13	DF	NZL	Alfie Rogers
15	MF	NZL	Dan Morgan
16	DF	KOR	Kim Dae-wook
17	MF	NZL	Reid Drake
19	MF	SOL	Micah Lea'alafa
20	FW	ARG	Emiliano Tade
21	DF	NZL	Harry Edge
23	DF	SRB	Marko Đorđević
24	GK	NZL	Conor Tracey
26	FW	NZL	Callum McCowatt
30	GK	NZL	Cameron Brown

== Grêmio ==
Manager: (Brazil) Renato Portaluppi

Note: Flags indicate national team as defined under FIFA eligibility rules; some limited exceptions apply. Players may hold more than one non-FIFA nationality.

No.	Pos.	Nation	Player
1	GK	BRA	Marcelo Grohe
2	DF	BRA	Edílson
3	DF	BRA	Pedro Geromel (vice-captain)
4	DF	ARG	Walter Kannemann
5	MF	BRA	Michel
6	DF	BRA	Leonardo Gomes
7	FW	BRA	Luan
8	MF	BRA	Maicon (captain)
9	FW	BRA	Jael
11	FW	BRA	Éverton
12	DF	BRA	Bruno Cortez
14	DF	BRA	Bruno Rodrigo

No.	Pos.	Nation	Player
15	DF	BRA	Rafael Thyere
17	MF	BRA	Ramiro
18	FW	PAR	Lucas Barrios
21	FW	BRA	Fernandinho
22	DF	BRA	Bressan
25	MF	BRA	Jailson
26	DF	BRA	Marcelo Oliveira (3rd captain)
28	MF	BRA	Kaio
30	GK	BRA	Bruno Grassi
48	GK	BRA	Paulo Victor
88	DF	BRA	Léo Moura

== Pachuca ==
Manager: (Uruguay) Diego Alonso

Note: Flags indicate national team as defined under FIFA eligibility rules; some limited exceptions apply. Players may hold more than one non-FIFA nationality.

No.	Pos.	Nation	Player
2	MF	JPN	Keisuke Honda
4	DF	USA	Omar Gonzalez
5	MF	MEX	Víctor Guzmán
6	DF	MEX	Raúl López
7	FW	CHI	Ángelo Sagal
9	FW	ARG	Germán Cano
10	MF	URU	Jonathan Urretaviscaya
11	FW	CHI	Edson Puch
12	DF	MEX	Emmanuel García
13	GK	MEX	Alfonso Blanco
14	MF	MEX	Érick Aguirre
15	MF	MEX	Érick Gutiérrez (captain)

No.	Pos.	Nation	Player
16	MF	MEX	Jorge Hernández (vice-captain)
18	DF	MEX	Joaquín Martínez
19	MF	MEX	Tony Figueroa
21	GK	MEX	Óscar Pérez
22	GK	MEX	Abraham Romero
23	DF	COL	Óscar Murillo
25	DF	MEX	Alexis Peña
26	DF	URU	Robert Herrera
29	FW	ARG	Franco Jara
89	FW	MEX	Roberto de la Rosa
98	MF	MEX	Erick Sánchez

== Real Madrid ==
Manager: (France) Zinedine Zidane

Note: Flags indicate national team as defined under FIFA eligibility rules; some limited exceptions apply. Players may hold more than one non-FIFA nationality.

No.	Pos.	Nation	Player
1	GK	CRC	Keylor Navas
2	DF	ESP	Dani Carvajal
4	DF	ESP	Sergio Ramos (captain)
5	DF	FRA	Raphaël Varane
6	DF	ESP	Nacho
7	FW	POR	Cristiano Ronaldo (3rd captain)
8	MF	GER	Toni Kroos
9	FW	FRA	Karim Benzema (4th captain)
10	MF	CRO	Luka Modrić
11	FW	WAL	Gareth Bale
12	DF	BRA	Marcelo (vice-captain)
13	GK	ESP	Kiko Casilla

No.	Pos.	Nation	Player
14	MF	BRA	Casemiro
15	DF	FRA	Théo Hernandez
17	FW	ESP	Lucas Vázquez
18	MF	ESP	Marcos Llorente
19	DF	MAR	Achraf Hakimi
20	MF	ESP	Marco Asensio
21	FW	ESP	Borja Mayoral
22	MF	ESP	Isco
23	MF	CRO	Mateo Kovačić
24	MF	ESP	Dani Ceballos
35	GK	ESP	Moha Ramos

== Urawa Red Diamonds ==
Manager: (Japan) Takafumi Hori

Note: Flags indicate national team as defined under FIFA eligibility rules; some limited exceptions apply. Players may hold more than one non-FIFA nationality.

No.	Pos.	Nation	Player
1	GK	JPN	Shusaku Nishikawa
2	DF	BRA	Maurício Antônio
3	MF	JPN	Tomoya Ugajin
4	DF	JPN	Daisuke Nasu
5	DF	JPN	Tomoaki Makino
6	DF	JPN	Wataru Endo
7	MF	JPN	Tsukasa Umesaki
8	FW	BRA	Rafael Silva
9	FW	JPN	Yuki Muto
10	MF	JPN	Yōsuke Kashiwagi
13	FW	JPN	Toshiyuki Takagi
15	MF	JPN	Kazuki Nagasawa

No.	Pos.	Nation	Player
16	MF	JPN	Takuya Aoki
18	MF	JPN	Yoshiaki Komai
20	FW	JPN	Tadanari Lee
21	FW	SLO	Zlatan Ljubijankić
22	MF	JPN	Yuki Abe (captain)
23	GK	JPN	Nao Iwadate
25	GK	JPN	Tetsuya Enomoto
30	FW	JPN	Shinzo Koroki
38	MF	JPN	Daisuke Kikuchi
39	MF	JPN	Shinya Yajima
46	DF	JPN	Ryota Moriwaki

== Wydad AC ==
Manager: (Morocco) Hussein Amotta

Note: Flags indicate national team as defined under FIFA eligibility rules; some limited exceptions apply. Players may hold more than one non-FIFA nationality.

No.	Pos.	Nation	Player
4	MF	MAR	Salaheddine Saidi (vice-captain)
5	DF	MAR	Amine Atouchi
6	MF	MAR	Brahim Nekkach (captain)
7	FW	MAR	Mohamed Ounajem
8	DF	MAR	Badr Gaddarine
9	FW	MAR	Mohammed Aoulad
10	FW	CIV	Guillaume Nicaise Daho
11	MF	MAR	Ismail El Haddad
12	GK	MAR	Badreddine Benachour
13	DF	MAR	Youssef Rabeh
17	FW	MAR	Achraf Bencharki
18	MF	MAR	Walid El Karti

No.	Pos.	Nation	Player
19	MF	MAR	Amin Tighazoui
22	GK	MAR	Zouhair Laaroubi
24	MF	MAR	Jamel Aït Ben Idir
25	DF	BFA	Mohamed Ouattara
26	MF	MAR	Abdeladim Khadrouf
27	FW	MAR	Zakaria El Hachimi
28	DF	MAR	Abdelatif Noussir
29	GK	MAR	Yassine El Kharroubi
30	MF	MAR	Mohamed Nahiri
31	DF	CIV	Cheick Comara
37	FW	MAR	Reda Hajhouj
