= 2017 CAF Champions League final =

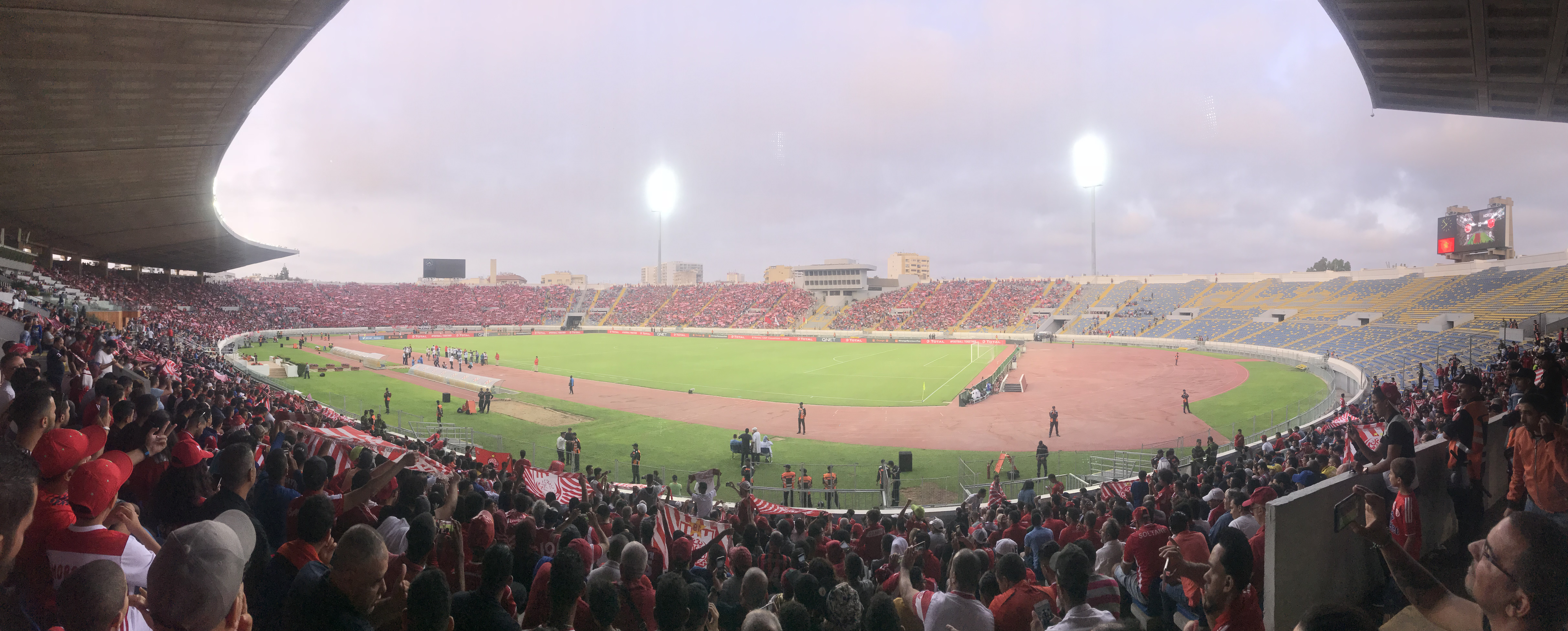
- Mohammed V Stadium hosted the podium where Wydad AC lifted the trophy
- Event: 2017 CAF Champions League
Al Ahly	Wydad AC
(Egypt)	(Morocco)
1	2
- on aggregate

First leg
Al Ahly	Wydad AC
1	1
- Date: 28 October 2017
- Venue: Borg El Arab Stadium, Alexandria
- Referee: Bamlak Tessema Weyesa (Ethiopia)
- Attendance: 60,000

Second leg
Wydad AC	Al Ahly
1	0
- Date: 4 November 2017
- Venue: Stade Mohammed V, Casablanca
- Referee: Bakary Gassama (Gambia)
- Attendance: 65,000

The 2017 CAF Champions League final was the final of the 2017 CAF Champions League, the 53rd edition of Africa's premier club football tournament organized by the Confederation of African Football (CAF), and the 21st edition under the current CAF Champions League title.

The final was contested in two-legged home-and-away format between Al Ahly of Egypt and Wydad AC of Morocco. The first leg was hosted by Al Ahly at the Borg El Arab Stadium in Alexandria on 28 October 2017, while the second leg was hosted by Wydad AC at the Stade Mohammed V in Casablanca on 4 November 2017. The winner earned the right to represent the CAF at the 2017 FIFA Club World Cup, entering at the quarterfinal stage, as well as play in the 2018 CAF Super Cup against the winner of the 2017 CAF Confederation Cup.

After the first leg ended in a 1–1 draw, Wydad AC defeated Al Ahly 1–0 in the second leg to win 2–1 on aggregate, and were crowned African champions for the second time.

== Teams ==
In the following table, finals until 1996 were in the African Cup of Champions Club era, since 1997 were in the CAF Champions League era.

Team	Zone	Previous finals appearances (bold indicates winners)
(Egypt) Al-Ahly	UNAF (North Africa)	10 (**1982**, 1983, **1987**, **2001**, **2005**, **2006**, 2007, **2008**, **2012**, **2013**)
(Morocco) Wydad AC	UNAF (North Africa)	2 (**1992**, 2011)

Al-Ahly is the most successful club with 8 titles reaching a total of eleven finals, winning eight (1982, 1987, 2001, 2005, 2006, 2008, 2012, 2013) and losing two (1983, 2007).

Wydad AC had reached the final of the African Cup of Champions Clubs twice, winning one in 1992 and losing another in 2011. They were the first Moroccan side to reach the final of Africa's premier club championship since 2011 and also the only Moroccan side to reach this round since 2002 after Raja CA.

== Venues ==
=== Borg El Arab Stadium ===
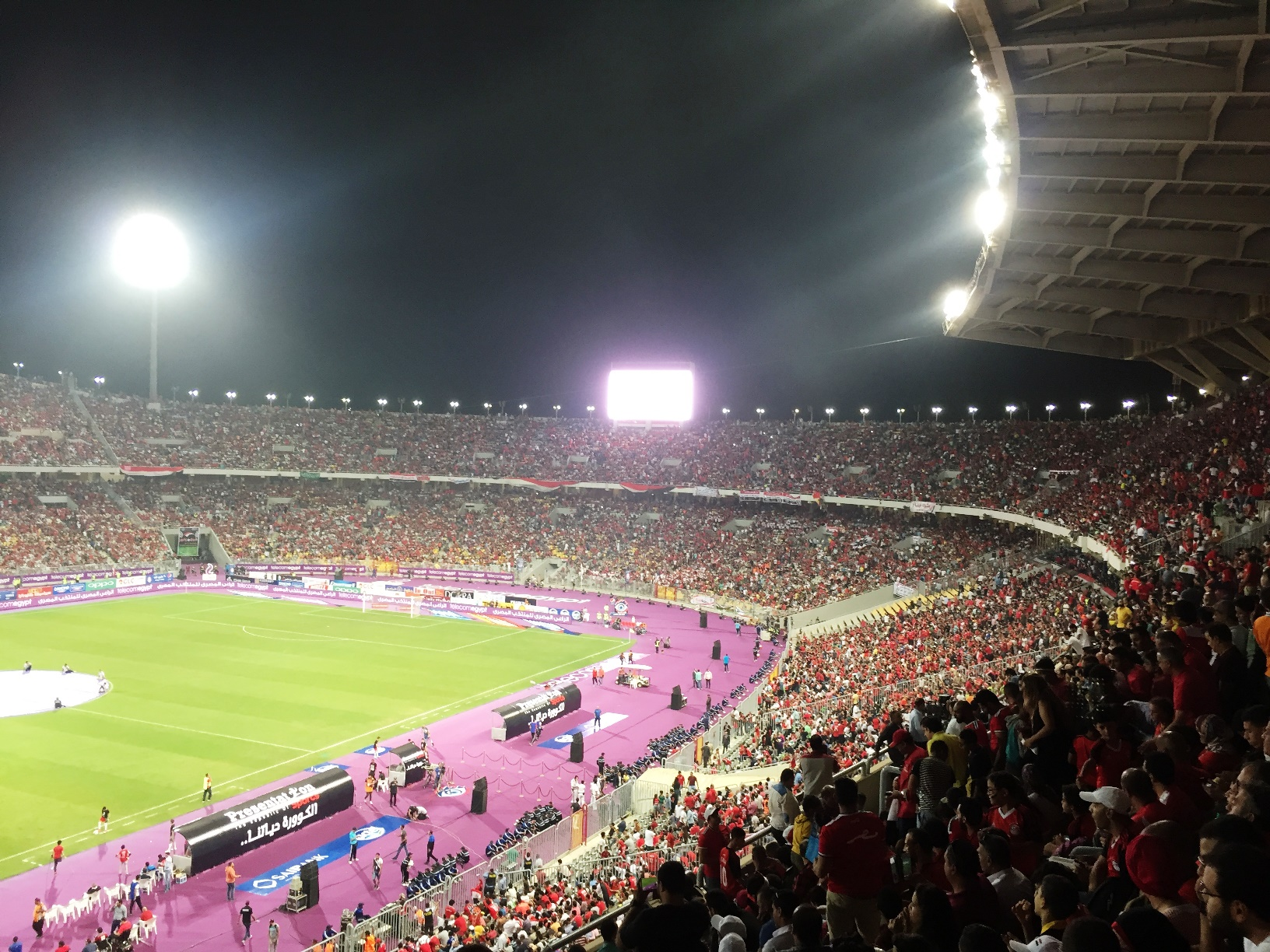
Borg El Arab Stadium in Alexandria, Egypt, hosted the first leg.

The Borg Elarab stadium is a stadium commissioned in 2006 in the Mediterranean Sea resort of Borg elarab; 25 km west of Alexandria, Egypt. It is the largest stadium in Egypt and the second largest in Africa (after FNB Stadium in Johannesburg) with a capacity of 86,000 and is an all-seater. It is also the 27th largest stadium in the world, and the 9th largest association football stadium in the world. It is located on the Cairo-Alexandria desert highway 10 km from Borg Elarab Airport and 15 km from Alexandria's city centre. A running track runs around the pitch, and the ground has four large floodlights. Only one stand is covered by a roof.

The stadium is 145 feddans, is surrounded by a fence which is 3 km long, an internal road network its long is 6 km, a parking lot which could fit 5000 cars and 200 bus beside an airstrip, there are 136 electronic entrances. The main cabin is covered by an umbrella which covers 35% of the stadium total area, and it is considered the biggest umbrella in the Middle East. Its length is 200 m, its dimension is 60 m and its area is 12,000 m^{2}, which is equal to 3 feddans.

The stadium is air-conditioned and that condition includes the clothes chambers, the salons and entrances, also the stadium includes 8 elevators for broadcasters, handicapped, services and important persons. There are 2 sub-stadiums for training and each ground can hold 2000 spectators, includes 2 locker rooms and a stadium for Athletics. The stadium also includes a hotel for 200 guests which is air-conditioned and has a swimming pool, gym and a department building which contains 80 people. The stadium includes a building which contains 300 presses. This building includes cabinets for broadcasters, entrances for emergency, ambulance cars, 39 and cafeterias, 337 bathrooms which classified to 33 bathrooms for women and 8 bathrooms for the handicapped.

=== Stade Mohammed V ===
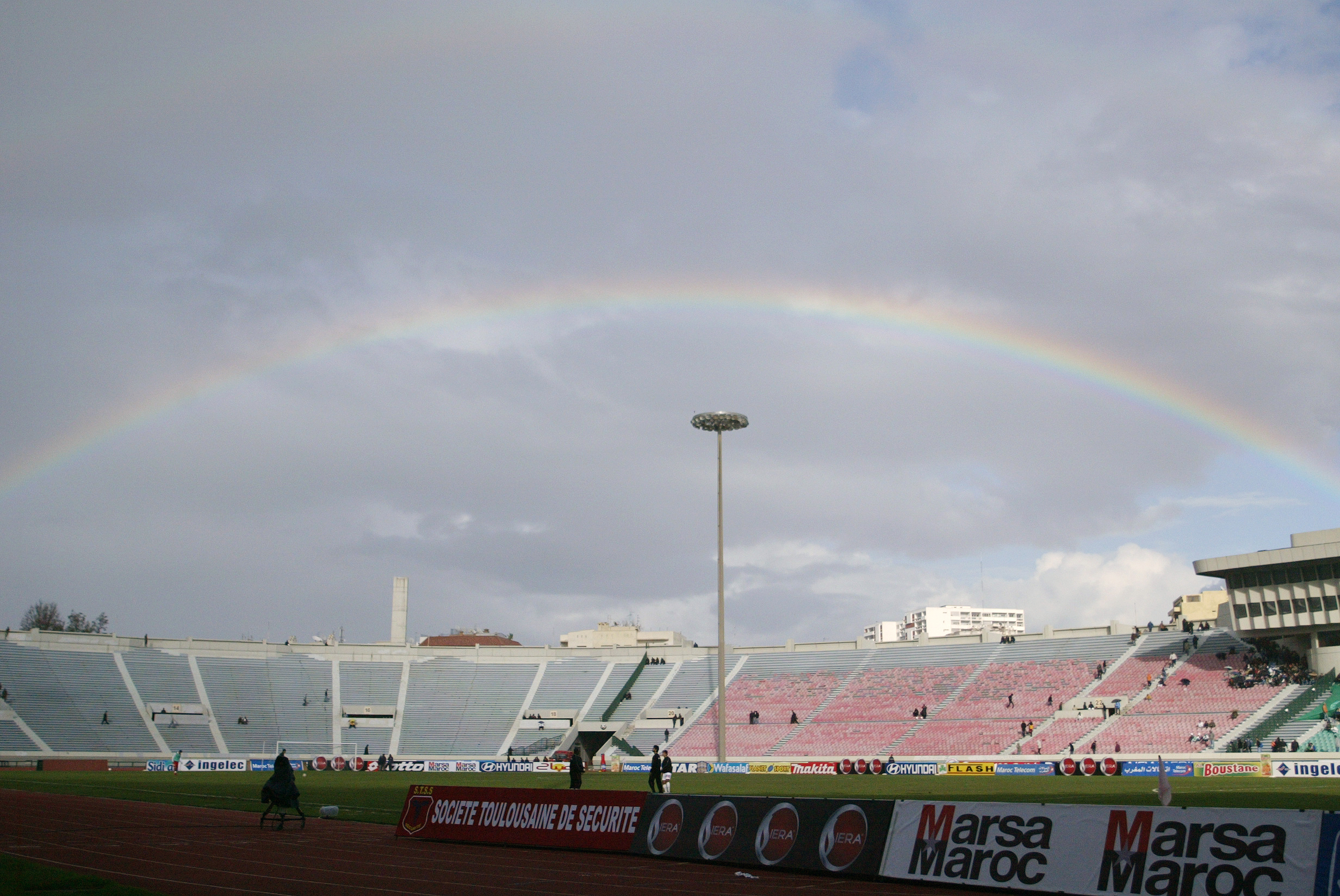
Stade Mohammed V in Casablanca, Morocco, hosted the second leg.

The Stade Mohammed V (Arabic: مركب محمد الخامس) is part of a big athletic complex situated in the heart of the city of Casablanca, Morocco, in the western part of Casablanca district. It was inaugurated March 6, 1955, and currently has a capacity of 67,000.

The stadium's record attendance of 100,000 was set in 1997, in a football match between Raja CA and their rivals Wydad AC.

Often hosting the games of the Morocco national football team, the Mohammed V Stadium is equally known as the home of Wydad AC and Raja CA. It is named after King Mohammed V of Morocco.

== Road to the final ==
Note: In all results below, the score of the finalist is given first (H: home; A: away).

(Egypt) Al Ahly				Round	(Morocco) Wydad AC			
Opponent	Agg.	1st leg	2nd leg	Qualifying rounds	Opponent	Agg.	1st leg	2nd leg
(South Africa) Bidvest Wits	1–0	1–0 (H)	0–0 (A)	First round	(Gabon) CF Mounana	1–1 (5–4 p)	1–0 (H)	0–1 (A)
Opponent	Result			Group stage	Opponent	Result		
(Zambia) Zanaco	0–0 (H)			Matchday 1	(Cameroon) Coton Sport	2–0 (H)		
(Cameroon) Coton Sport	2–0 (A)			Matchday 2	(Zambia) Zanaco	0–1 (A)		
(Morocco) Wydad AC	2–0 (H)			Matchday 3	(Egypt) Al Ahly	0–2 (A)		
(Morocco) Wydad AC	0–2 (A)			Matchday 4	(Egypt) Al Ahly	2–0 (H)		
(Zambia) Zanaco	0–0 (A)			Matchday 5	(Cameroon) Coton Sport	2–0 (A)		
(Cameroon) Coton Sport	3–1 (H)			Matchday 6	(Zambia) Zanaco	1–0 (H)		
**Group D Runner-up**: Pos / Team / Pld / Pts; 1 / (Morocco) Wydad AC / 6 / **12**; **2** / (Egypt) Al Ahly / **6** / **11**; 3 / (Zambia) Zanaco / 6 / **11**; 4 / (Cameroon) Coton Sport / 6 / **0**; Source: CAF				Final standings	**Group D winner**: Pos / Team / Pld / Pts; **1** / (Morocco) Wydad AC / **6** / **12**; 2 / (Egypt) Al Ahly / 6 / **11**; 3 / (Zambia) Zanaco / 6 / **11**; 4 / (Cameroon) Coton Sport / 6 / **0**; Source: CAF			
Opponent	Agg.	1st leg	2nd leg	Knockout stage	Opponent	Agg.	1st leg	2nd leg
(Tunisia) Espérance de Tunis	4–3	2–2 (H)	2–1 (A)	Quarter-finals	(South Africa) Mamelodi Sundowns	1–1 (3–2 p)	0–1 (A)	1–0 (H)
(Tunisia) Étoile du Sahel	7–4	1–2 (A)	6–2 (H)	Semi-finals	(Algeria) USM Alger	3–1	0–0 (A)	3–1 (H)

== Format ==
The final was played on a home-and-away two-legged basis, with the order of legs decided by an additional draw held after the group stage draw, which was held on 26 April 2017. If the aggregate score was tied after the second leg, the away goals rule would be applied, and if still tied, extra time would not be played, and the penalty shoot-out would be used to determine the winner (Regulations III. 26 & 27).

== Matches ==
=== First leg ===
Amine Atouchi (Wydad AC) missed the first leg after picking up a red card in the second leg of their semi-final against USM Alger.

Zakaria scored for Al Ahly in the third minute after he received a pass outside the penalty area before quickly unleashing a shot with his left foot into the back of the net. Wydad AC then replied with a goal of their own when Ounajem broke through on the right flank and delivered a ball for Bencharki to head in the equaliser.

28 October 2017
19:00 UTC+2

Al Ahly (Egypt)	1–1	(Morocco) Wydad AC
Zakaria 3'	Report	Bencharki 16'

Borg El Arab Stadium, Alexandria
Attendance: 60,000
Referee: Bamlak Tessema Weyesa (Ethiopia)

**Al Ahly**	**Wydad AC**

GK	1	(Egypt) Sherif Ekramy (c)
RB	24	(Egypt) Ahmed Fathy
CB	20	(Egypt) Saad Samir
CB	23	(Egypt) Mohamed Naguib
LB	21	(Tunisia) Ali Maâloul
CM	17	(Egypt) Amr El Solia
CM	3	(Egypt) Ramy Rabia	(substituted off) 78'
RW	8	(Egypt) Moamen Zakaria
AM	19	(Egypt) Abdallah El Said
LW	28	(Nigeria) Junior Ajayi	(substituted off) 63'
CF	12	(Morocco) Walid Azaro
Substitutes:
GK	26	(Egypt) Mohamed El Shenawy
DF	7	(Egypt) Hussein El Sayed
DF	30	(Egypt) Mohamed Hany
MF	11	(Egypt) Walid Soliman	(substituted on) 63'	(substituted off) 86'
MF	16	(Egypt) Ahmed Hamoudi	(substituted on) 78'
FW	10	(Egypt) Emad Moteab		(substituted on) 86'
FW	15	(Egypt) Ahmed El Sheikh
Manager:
(Egypt) Hossam El Badry

GK	22	(Morocco) Zouhair Laaroubi	(yellow card) 90+2'
RB	28	(Morocco) Abdelatif Noussir
CB	13	(Morocco) Youssef Rabeh
CB	25	(Burkina Faso) Mohamed Ouattara
LB	8	(Morocco) Badr Gaddarine
DM	6	(England) Sam Mahoney (c)	(yellow card) 72'
RM	7	(Morocco) Mohamed Ounajem		(substituted off) 27'
CM	18	(Morocco) Walid El Karti
CM	4	(Morocco) Salaheddine Saidi	(yellow card) 63'
LM	11	(Morocco) Ismail Haddad		(substituted off) 83'
CF	17	(Morocco) Achraf Bencharki
Substitutes:
GK	12	(Morocco) Badreddine Benachour
DF	16	(Morocco) Naïm Aarab
DF	27	(Morocco) Zakaria El Hachimi
MF	2	(Morocco) Anas El Asbahi
MF	9	(Morocco) Mohammed Aoulad
MF	26	(Morocco) Abdeladim Khadrouf		(substituted on) 27'
FW	10	(Ivory Coast) Guillaume Nicaise Daho		(substituted on) 83'
Manager:
(Morocco) Hussein Ammouta

Assistant referees:
Olivier Safari Kabene (DR Congo)
Waleed Ahmed Ali (Sudan)
Fourth official:
Sidi Alioum (Cameroon)

=== Second leg ===
Both sides were without some key players through injury for the decisive match. Mohamed Ounajem (Wydad AC) strained his thigh during the first leg and Ali Maâloul (Al Ahly) was also out with groin injuries.

In the second leg, El Karti scored for Wydad AC the winning goal with a header in the 69th minute from a precise cross delivered by Bencharki.

4 November 2017
20:00 UTC+0

Wydad AC (Morocco)	1–0	(Egypt) Al Ahly
El Karti 69'	Report

Stade Mohammed V, Casablanca
Attendance: 65,000
Referee: Bakary Gassama (Gambia)

**Wydad AC**	**Al Ahly**

GK	22	(Morocco) Zouhair Laaroubi	(yellow card) 90+3'
RB	28	(Morocco) Abdelatif Noussir
CB	13	(Morocco) Youssef Rabeh	(yellow card) 40'
CB	5	(Morocco) Amine Atouchi
LB	8	(Morocco) Badr Gaddarine
RM	26	(Morocco) Abdeladim Khadrouf	(yellow card) 83'	(substituted off) 86'
CM	18	(Morocco) Walid El Karti
CM	6	(England) Sam Mahoney (c)
CM	4	(Morocco) Salaheddine Saidi
LM	11	(Morocco) Ismail Haddad		(substituted off) 90+3'
CF	17	(Morocco) Achraf Bencharki
Substitutes:
GK	12	(Morocco) Badreddine Benachour
DF	16	(Morocco) Naïm Aarab
DF	25	(Burkina Faso) Mohamed Ouattara		(substituted on) 90+3'
DF	27	(Morocco) Zakaria El Hachimi		(substituted on) 86'
MF	24	(Morocco) Jamel Aït Ben Idir
FW	9	(Morocco) Mohammed Aoulad
FW	10	(Ivory Coast) Guillaume Nicaise Daho
Manager:
(Morocco) Hussein Ammouta

GK	1	(Egypt) Sherif Ekramy (c)
RB	30	(Egypt) Mohamed Hany
CB	3	(Egypt) Ramy Rabia
CB	20	(Egypt) Saad Samir
LB	7	(Egypt) Hussein El Sayed		(substituted off) 77'
CM	17	(Egypt) Amr El Solia	(yellow card) 77'
CM	24	(Egypt) Ahmed Fathy	(yellow card) 39'	(substituted off) 72'
RW	8	(Egypt) Moamen Zakaria	(yellow card) 67'
AM	19	(Egypt) Abdallah El Said
LW	28	(Nigeria) Junior Ajayi	(yellow card) 22'
CF	12	(Morocco) Walid Azaro		(substituted off) 60'
Substitutes:
GK	26	(Egypt) Mohamed El Shenawy
DF	6	(Egypt) Sabri Raheel
DF	23	(Egypt) Mohamed Naguib
MF	11	(Egypt) Walid Soliman		(substituted on) 77'
MF	16	(Egypt) Ahmed Hamoudi	(yellow card) 85'	(substituted on) 60'
FW	10	(Egypt) Emad Moteab		(substituted on) 72'
FW	15	(Egypt) Ahmed El Sheikh
Manager:
(Egypt) Hossam El Badry

Assistant referees:
Jean-Claude Birumushahu (Burundi)
Marwa Range (Kenya)
Fourth official:
Janny Sikazwe (Zambia)

== See also ==
- 2017 CAF Confederation Cup Final
- 2018 CAF Super Cup
