= 2015–16 Wydad AC season =

Wydd Athletic Club
2015–16 season
- President: Said Naciri
- Manager: John Toshack
- Stadium: Stade Mohamed V
- Botola Pro: Qualified
- Coupe du Trône: Qualified
- CAF Champions League: Qualified
Home colours	Away colours	Third colours

The 2015–16 season Wydad AC will participate in this season's editions of the Botola Pro, Coupe du Trône and CAF Champions League.

== Current squad ==
As of 19 March 2015

Note: Flags indicate national team as defined under FIFA eligibility rules; some limited exceptions apply. Players may hold more than one non-FIFA nationality.

No.	Pos.	Nation	Player
1	GK	(Morocco) MAR	Mohamed Akid
2	MF	(Morocco) MAR	Anas El Asbahi
4	MF	(Morocco) MAR	Salaheddine Saidi
5	DF	(Morocco) MAR	Amine Attouchi
6	MF	(Morocco) MAR	Brahim Nekkach
8	FW	(Morocco) MAR	Reda Hajhouj
—	MF	(Morocco) MAR	Mehdi Karnass
12	GK	(Morocco) MAR	Badreddine Benachour
13	DF	(Morocco) MAR	Youssef Rabeh
15	DF	(Senegal) SEN	Mortada FALL
25	FW	(Morocco) MAR	ISMAEL EL HADDAD
16	DF	(Morocco) MAR	Ayoub Qasmi
17	MF	(Morocco) MAR	Rashid Housni
18	MF	(Morocco) MAR	Walid El Karti
20	DF	(Morocco) MAR	Yassine El Kordy
21	FW	(Republic of the Congo) CGO	Fabrice N'Guessi
22	DF	(Gabon) GAB	Zee ONDO
—	FW	(Senegal) SEN	Ibrahim SORY KEITA
7	FW	(Belgium) BEL	OUNAJEM
—	FW	(Niger) NIG	CHIKATARA
22	GK	(Morocco) MAR	LAAROUBI
28	DF	(Morocco) MAR	Abdelatif Noussir
