= 2017 CAF Champions League knockout stage =

The 2017 CAF Champions League knockout stage was played from 8 September to 4 November 2017. A total of eight teams competed in the knockout stage to decide the champions of the 2017 CAF Champions League.

== Qualified teams ==
The winners and runners-up of each of the four groups in the group stage advanced to the quarter-finals.

Group	Winners	Runners-up
A	(Tunisia) Étoile du Sahel	(Mozambique) Ferroviário Beira
B	(Algeria) USM Alger	(Libya) Al Ahli Tripoli
C	(Tunisia) Espérance de Tunis	(South Africa) Mamelodi Sundowns
D	(Morocco) Wydad AC	(Egypt) Al Ahly

== Format ==
In the knockout stage, the eight teams played a single-elimination tournament. Each tie was played on a home-and-away two-legged basis. If the aggregate score was tied after the second leg, the away goals rule would be applied, and if still tied, extra time would not be played, and the penalty shoot-out would be used to determine the winner (Regulations III. 26 & 27).

== Schedule ==
The schedule of each round was as follows.

Round	First leg	Second leg
Quarter-finals	15–17 September 2017	22–24 September 2017
Semi-finals	29 September – 1 October 2017	20–22 October 2017
Final	27–29 October 2017	3–5 November 2017

The calendar was amended from the original one for the following dates:

- Quarter-finals first leg: moved from 8–10 September to 15–17 September
- Quarter-finals second leg: moved from 15–17 September to 22–24 September
- Semi-finals second leg: moved from 13–15 October to 20–22 October

== Bracket ==
The bracket of the knockout stage was determined as follows:

Round	Matchups
Quarter-finals	(Group winners host second leg): QF1: Runner-up Group B vs. Winner Group A; QF2: Runner-up Group D vs. Winner Group C; QF3: Runner-up Group A vs. Winner Group B; QF4: Runner-up Group C vs. Winner Group D
Semi-finals	(Order of legs decided by draw): SF1: Winner QF1 vs. Winner QF2; SF2: Winner QF3 vs. Winner QF4
Final	(Order of legs decided by draw): Winner SF1 vs. Winner SF2

The order of legs for the semi-finals and final was decided by an additional draw held after the group stage draw on 26 April 2017, 14:00 EET (UTC+2), at the CAF Headquarters in Cairo, Egypt.

Quarter-finals
(Libya) Al Ahli Tripoli	0	0	0
(Tunisia) Étoile du Sahel	0	2	2
(Egypt) Al Ahly	2	2	4
(Tunisia) Espérance de Tunis	2	1	3
(Mozambique) Ferroviário Beira	1	0	1
(Algeria) USM Alger	1	0	1 (a)
(South Africa) Mamelodi Sundowns	1	0	1 (2)
(Morocco) Wydad AC	0	1	1 (3)

Semi-finals
(Tunisia) Étoile du Sahel	2	2	4
(Egypt) Al Ahly	1	6	7
(Algeria) USM Alger	0	1	1
(Morocco) Wydad AC	0	3	3

Final
(Egypt) Al Ahly	1	0	1
(Morocco) Wydad AC	1	1	2

== Quarter-finals ==
In the quarter-finals, the winners of one group played the runners-up of another group, with the group winners hosting the second leg.

Team 1	Agg.	Team 2	1st leg	2nd leg
Al Ahli Tripoli (Libya)	0–2	(Tunisia) Étoile du Sahel	0–0	0–2
Al Ahly (Egypt)	4–3	(Tunisia) Espérance de Tunis	2–2	2–1
Ferroviário Beira (Mozambique)	1–1 (a)	(Algeria) USM Alger	1–1	0–0
Mamelodi Sundowns (South Africa)	1–1 (2–3 p)	(Morocco) Wydad AC	1–0	0–1

17 September 2017
20:00 UTC+2

Al-Ahli Tripoli (Libya)	0–0	(Tunisia) Étoile du Sahel
	Report

Borg El Arab Stadium, Alexandria (Egypt) (Note: Teams from Libya were not allowed to host their home matches in their country due to security concerns.)
Attendance: 550
Referee: Mehdi Abid Charef (Algeria)
24 September 2017
18:30 UTC+1

Étoile du Sahel (Tunisia)	2–0	(Libya) Al-Ahli Tripoli
Marey 14', 47'	Report

Stade Olympique de Sousse, Sousse
Attendance: 20,000
Referee: Janny Sikazwe (Zambia)

Étoile du Sahel won 2–0 on aggregate.

16 September 2017
19:00 UTC+2

Al-Ahly (Egypt)	2–2	(Tunisia) Espérance de Tunis
Said 11' (pen.); Azaro 67'	Report	Khenissi 21'; Chaalali 48'

Borg El Arab Stadium, Alexandria
Attendance: 25,000
Referee: Malang Diedhiou (Senegal)
23 September 2017
19:00 UTC+1

Espérance de Tunis (Tunisia)	1–2	(Egypt) Al-Ahly
Khenissi 40' (pen.)	Report	Maâloul 50'; Ajayi 62'

Stade Olympique de Radès, Tunis
Attendance: 40,000
Referee: Sidi Alioum (Cameroon)

Al-Ahly won 4–3 on aggregate.

16 September 2017
15:00 UTC+2

Ferroviário Beira (Mozambique)	1–1	(Algeria) USM Alger
Kanda 89'	Report	Darfalou 63'

Estádio do Chiveve, Beira
Attendance: 6,000
Referee: Hamada Nampiandraza (Madagascar)
23 September 2017
18:30 UTC+1

USM Alger (Algeria)	0–0	(Mozambique) Ferroviário Beira
	Report

Stade du 5 Juillet, Algiers
Attendance: 35,000
Referee: Bakary Gassama (Gambia)

1–1 on aggregate. USM Alger won on away goals.

17 September 2017
15:00 UTC+2

Mamelodi Sundowns (South Africa)	1–0	(Morocco) Wydad AC
Zakri 71'	Report

Lucas Masterpieces Moripe Stadium, Pretoria
Attendance: 27,000
Referee: Bamlak Tessema Weyesa (Ethiopia)
23 September 2017
21:00 UTC+1

Wydad AC (Morocco)	1–0	(South Africa) Mamelodi Sundowns
Saidi 26'	Report
Penalties
Atouchi (penalty missed); Khadrouf (penalty scored); Bencharki (penalty scored); Ounajem (penalty scored)	3–2	(penalty scored) Lebese; (penalty missed) Tau; (penalty scored) Madisha; (penalty missed) Zakri; (penalty missed) Bangaly

Prince Moulay Abdellah Stadium, Rabat
Attendance: 45,000
Referee: Ali Lemghaifry (Mauritania)

1–1 on aggregate. Wydad AC won 3–2 on penalties.

== Semi-finals ==
In the semi-finals, the four quarter-final winners played in two ties, with the order of legs decided by an additional draw held after the group stage draw.

Team 1	Agg.	Team 2	1st leg	2nd leg
Étoile du Sahel (Tunisia)	4–7	(Egypt) Al Ahly	2–1	2–6
USM Alger (Algeria)	1–3	(Morocco) Wydad AC	0–0	1–3

1 October 2017
18:30 UTC+1

Étoile du Sahel (Tunisia)	2–1	(Egypt) Al-Ahly
Brigui 16'; Ben Amor 73'	Report	Gomaa 66'

Stade Olympique de Sousse, Sousse
Attendance: 22,000
Referee: Eric Otogo-Castane (Gabon)
22 October 2017
19:00 UTC+2

Al-Ahly (Egypt)	6–2	(Tunisia) Étoile du Sahel
Maâloul 2'; Azaro 23', 39', 48'; Nagguez 59' (o.g.); Rabia 63'	Report	Bedoui 51'; Msakni 90'

Borg El Arab Stadium, Alexandria
Attendance: 50,000
Referee: Victor Gomes (South Africa)

Al-Ahly won 7–4 on aggregate.

29 September 2017
18:00 UTC+1

USM Alger (Algeria)	0–0	(Morocco) Wydad AC
	Report

Stade du 5 Juillet, Algiers
Attendance: 62,000
Referee: Sidi Alioum (Cameroon)
21 October 2017
20:00 UTC+1

Wydad AC (Morocco)	3–1	(Algeria) USM Alger
El Karti 26'; Bencharki 54', 90+3'	Report	Abdellaoui 67'

Stade Mohammed V, Casablanca
Attendance: 60,000
Referee: Malang Diedhiou (Senegal)

Wydad AC won 3–1 on aggregate.

== Final ==
In the final, the two semi-final winners played each other, with the order of legs decided by an additional draw held after the group stage draw.

28 October 2017
19:00 UTC+2

Al Ahly (Egypt)	1–1	(Morocco) Wydad AC
Zakaria 3'	Report	Bencharki 16'

Borg El Arab Stadium, Alexandria
Attendance: 60,000
Referee: Bamlak Tessema Weyesa (Ethiopia)
4 November 2017
20:00 UTC+0

Wydad AC (Morocco)	1–0	(Egypt) Al Ahly
El Karti 69'	Report

Stade Mohammed V, Casablanca
Attendance: 65,000
Referee: Bakary Gassama (Gambia)

Wydad Casablanca won 2–1 on aggregate.
