= Abdeladim =

Abdeladim is a Moroccan masculine given name. Notable people with the name include:

- Abdeladim El Guerrouj (born 1972), Moroccan politician
- Abdeladim Khadrouf (born 1985), Moroccan footballer
