= 2018 CAF Super Cup =

2018 Total CAF Super Cup
Wydad AC	TP Mazembe
(Morocco)	(Democratic Republic of the Congo)
1	0
- Date: 24 February 2018
- Venue: Stade Mohammed V, Casablanca
- Referee: Janny Sikazwe (Zambia)
- Attendance: 45,000

The 2018 CAF Super Cup (officially the 2018 Total CAF Super Cup for sponsorship reasons) was the 26th CAF Super Cup, an annual football match in Africa organized by the Confederation of African Football (CAF), between the winners of the previous season's two CAF club competitions, the CAF Champions League and the CAF Confederation Cup.

The match was played between Wydad AC of Morocco, the 2017 CAF Champions League winners, and TP Mazembe of the Democratic Republic of the Congo, the 2017 CAF Confederation Cup winners. It was hosted by Wydad AC at the Stade Mohammed V in Casablanca on 24 February 2018.

Wydad AC won the match 1–0 to claim their first CAF Super Cup title.

== Teams ==
Team	Zone	Qualification	Previous appearances (bold indicates winners)
(Morocco) Wydad AC	UNAF (North Africa)	2017 CAF Champions League winners	2 (1993, 2003)
(Democratic Republic of the Congo) TP Mazembe	UNIFFAC (Central Africa)	2017 CAF Confederation Cup winners	4 (**2010**, **2011**, **2016**, 2017)

== Venue ==
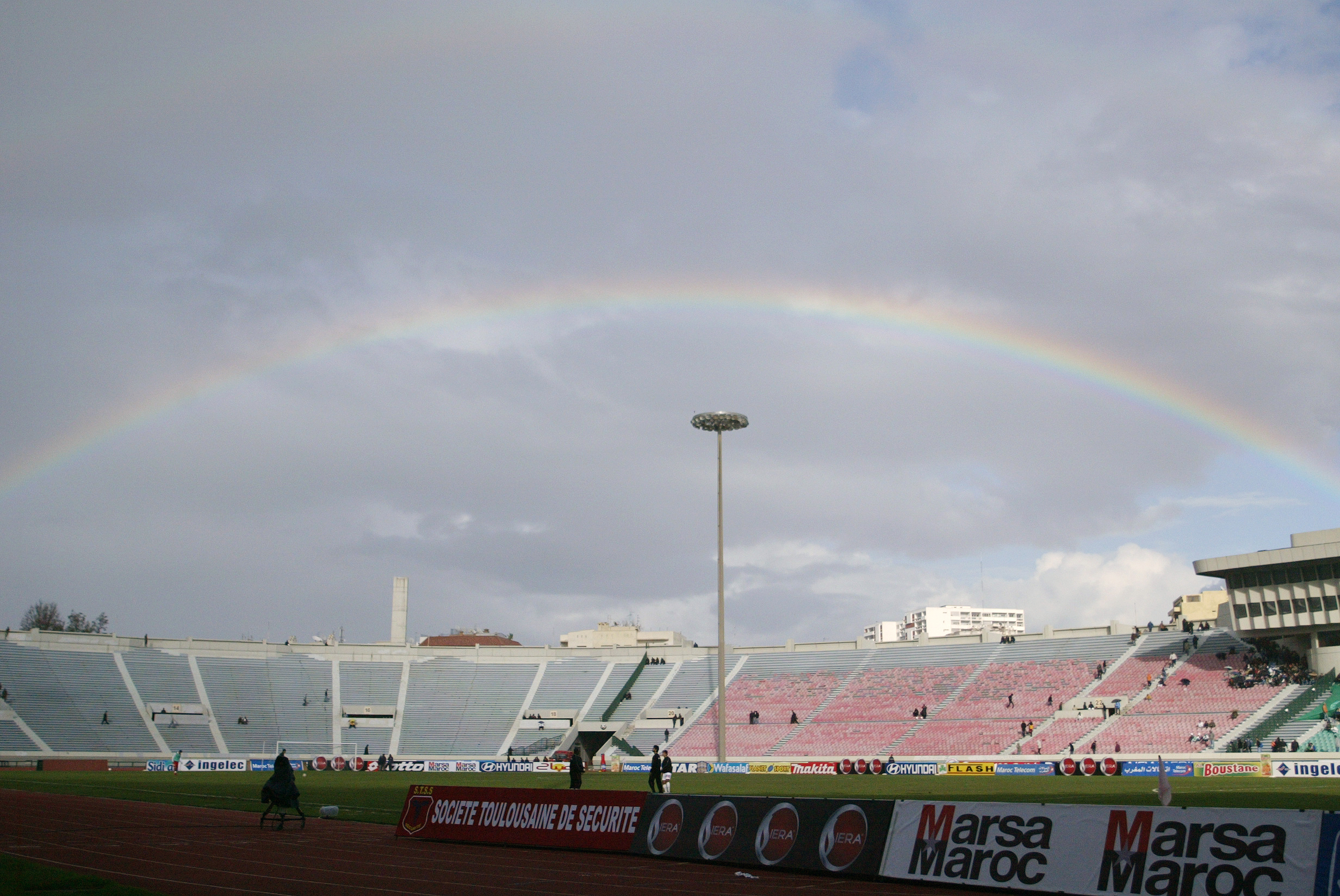
Stade Mohammed V in Casablanca, Morocco, hosted the match.

== Format ==
The CAF Super Cup was played as a single match, with the CAF Champions League winners hosting the match. If the score was tied at the end of regulation, extra time would not be played, and the penalty shoot-out would be used to determine the winner (CAF Champions League Regulations XXVII and CAF Confederation Cup Regulations XXV).

== Match ==
=== Details ===
24 February 2018
16:30 UTC+0

Wydad AC (Morocco)	1–0	(Democratic Republic of the Congo) TP Mazembe
Tighazoui 83'	Report

Stade Mohammed V, Casablanca
Attendance: 45,000
Referee: Janny Sikazwe (Zambia)

**Wydad AC**	**TP Mazembe**

GK	22	(Morocco) Zouhair Laaroubi
RB	28	(Morocco) Abdelatif Noussir
CB	5	(Morocco) Amine Atouchi
CB	29	(Ivory Coast) Cheick Comara
LB	30	(Morocco) Mohamed Nahiri
RM	19	(Morocco) Amin Tighazoui	(substituted off) 90+3'
CM	4	(Morocco) Salaheddine Saidi
CM	6	(Morocco) Brahim Nekkach (c)
LM	11	(Morocco) Ismail Haddad
CF	23	(Nigeria) Chisom Chikatara	(substituted off) 63'
CF	18	(Morocco) Walid El Karti	(substituted off) 70'
Substitutes:
GK	1	(Morocco) Yassine El Kharroubi
DF	16	(Belgium) Naïm Aarab	(substituted on) 90+3'
DF	27	(Morocco) Zakaria El Hachimi
MF	10	(Ghana) Daniel Nii Adjei
MF	24	(Morocco) Jamel Aït Ben Idir
FW	20	(Morocco) Ayman El Hassouni	(substituted on) 70'
FW	25	(Argentina) Alejandro Quintana	(substituted on) 63'
Manager:
(Tunisia) Faouzi Benzarti

GK	22	(Ivory Coast) Sylvain Gbohouo
RB	5	(Democratic Republic of the Congo) Issama Mpeko
CB	14	(Zambia) Kabaso Chongo	(yellow card) 14'
CB	2	(Democratic Republic of the Congo) Joël Kimwaki
LB	4	(Democratic Republic of the Congo) Arsène Zola
RM	9	(Democratic Republic of the Congo) Déo Kanda		(substituted off) 66'
CM	16	(Ivory Coast) Christian Koffi		(substituted off) 68'
CM	27	(Democratic Republic of the Congo) Miché Mika
LM	23	(Democratic Republic of the Congo) Elia Meschak		(substituted off) 82'
CF	28	(Democratic Republic of the Congo) Ben Malango
CF	18	(Zambia) Rainford Kalaba (c)	(yellow card) 88'
Substitutes:
GK	21	(Democratic Republic of the Congo) Ley Matampi
DF	3	(Democratic Republic of the Congo) Jean Kasusula
DF	15	(Democratic Republic of the Congo) Kévin Mondeko		(substituted on) 68'
MF	26	(Mali) Abdoulaye Sissoko		(substituted on) 66'
MF	29	(Democratic Republic of the Congo) Glody Likonza
FW	17	(Democratic Republic of the Congo) Jackson Muleka		(substituted on) 82'
Manager:
(Democratic Republic of the Congo) Mihayo Kazembe

Assistant referees:
Jerson Emiliano Dos Santos (Angola)
Zakhele Thusi Siwela (South Africa)
Fourth official:
Gehad Grisha (Egypt)

**Match rules**

- 90 minutes.
- Penalty shoot-out if scores level.
- Seven named substitutes, of which up to three may be used.

== Prize money ==
Prize money shared between CAF Champions League winner and CAF Confederations Cup winner in CAF Super Cup are as following :

Final position	Money awarded to club
winner	US$100,000
Runners-up	US$75,000

== See also ==
- 2018 CAF Champions League final
- 2018 CAF Confederation Cup final
