= Mohamed Ouattara =

Burkinabé footballer (born 1993)

Personal information
- Full name: Mohamed Ouattara
- Date of birth: 7 March 1993 (age 33)
- Place of birth: Bobo-Dioulasso, Burkina Faso
- Height: 1.85 m (6 ft 1 in)
- Position: Defender

Team information
- Current team: Karbala SC

Senior career*
Years	Team	Apps	(Gls)
2013–2017	Étoile Filante		
2017–2018	Wydad Casablanca	2	(0)
2018	→ RAC Casablanca (loan)	12	(3)
2018–2021	Olympic Safi	44	(5)
2021–2022	Al-Salt		
2022–2023	Al-Naft		
2023–2024	Al-Minaa	14	(2)
2024–2025	Karbala SC		
2025–	Al-Kahrabaa		

International career^{‡}
2017–	Burkina Faso	4	(0)
- * Club domestic league appearances and goals ‡ National team caps and goals as of 16 November 2021

Mohamed Ouattara (born 7 March 1993) is a Burkinabe professional footballer who plays as a defender for Iraqi club Al-Kahrabaa and the Burkina Faso national team.

== Club career ==
In August 2017, Ouattara moved to play in the Botola, where he signed with Wydad Casablanca on a three-year contract, and won the 2017 CAF Champions League, the 2018 CAF Super Cup, and the 2017–18 Botola runner-up with him. In January 2018, Ouattara was loaned to RAC Casablanca to make room for the signing of Argentine player Alejandro Quintana. In August 2018, he signed a two-year contract with Olympic Safi.

In March 2021, Ouattara moved to play in the Jordanian Pro League, signing a one-year contract with Al-Salt, and reached with them the final of the FA Cup and finished runner-up.

== International career ==
In August 2017, Ouattara was selected for Burkina Faso's two matches against Senegal in the 2018 FIFA World Cup qualification.

== Honours ==
Étoile Filante

- Burkinabé Premier League: 2013–14

Wydad Casablanca

- CAF Champions League: 2017
- CAF Super Cup: 2018
- Botola runner-up: 2017–18

Al-Salt

- Jordan FA Cup runner-up: 2021

Al-Minaa

- Iraqi First Division League: 2022–23
