= Abdeladim El Guerrouj =

Moroccan politician (born 1972)

Minister-Delegate for Public Service and the Modernization of the Administration
- In office 3 January 2012 – 10 October 2013
- Monarch: Mohammed VI
- Prime Minister: Abdelilah Benkirane
- Preceded by: Mohamed Saad Alami

Personal details
- Born: 1972 (age 53–54) Berkane, Morocco
- Party: Popular Movement
- Occupation: Politician, civil servant

Abdeladim El Guerrouj (Arabic: عبد العظيم الݣروج - born 1972, Berkane) is a Moroccan politician of the Popular Movement. He was the minister-delegate for public service and the modernization of the administration in the cabinet of Abdelilah Benkirane from 3 January 2012 to 10 October 2013. He was not reappointed to the following cabinet. He was previously a civil servant in the tax administration department in Rabat.

== See also ==
- Cabinet of Morocco
