= Chisom Chikatara =

Nigerian footballer

Personal information
- Full name: Chisom Elvis Chikatara
- Date of birth: 24 November 1994 (age 31)
- Place of birth: Abia, Nigeria
- Height: 1.87 m (6 ft 2 in)
- Position: Forward

Youth career
- 2002–2007: Independent FC
- 2007–2012: New Generation FC

Senior career*
Years	Team	Apps	(Gls)
2012–2016	Abia Warriors	71	(58)
2016–2018	Wydad AC	11	(1)
2018–2019	El Gouna FC	11	(1)
2019	→ Tala'ea El Gaish (loan)	6	(0)
2019	→ Akwa United (loan)	2	(0)
2019	Al-Faisaly		
2020	Al-Shabab Club		
2020–2021	Naft Maysan		
2021	Duhok SC		
2021	Gokulam Kerala	0	(0)
2022–2023	Abia Warriors	1	(0)
2025–	Al Brega Murassas	0	(1)

International career^{‡}
2014	Nigeria U23	3	(3)
2015–2016	Nigeria	5	(4)
- * Club domestic league appearances and goals as of 4 May 2022 ‡ National team caps and goals as of 26 January 2016

Chisom Elvis Chikatara (born 24 November 1994) is a Nigerian professional footballer who plays as a forward. He is known for his speed on the ball, dribbles and goal scoring abilities.

== Club career ==
=== Early career ===
Chikatara joined the local football club Independent FC, a club for children of age 13 below. After five years with the club, he outgrew it and moved over to New Generation FC. While playing for this club he sign a short loan deal with Benie Aries FC in a Super Four Competition between Abia Warriors, Heartland and Diamond Football Academy. He was the highest goal scorer in the competition. He had various offers to move to Heartland FC then which was already in the Ghana Premier League but finally he moved to Abia Warriors at the age of seventeen. He signed the contract in November 2012.

=== Abia Warriors FC ===
Chikatara was part of the pillar that brought the team into the 1st division league especially with his goal scoring technique. the Super "S" as he is called by fans always scores which made him to be named the highest goal scorer as the club was promoted. On 18 September 2015, his mother died and he was not told about it because the club had a home big clash against Warri Wolves, they won the match 2–1 before the Club Chairman High Chief Emeka Inyama Broke the news to him.

=== Later career ===
After leaving Egypt, Chikatara returned to Nigeria and began training with Akwa United in October 2019. No deal was signed with Akwa United and on 12 December 2019, Jordanian club Al-Faisaly announced that they had signed Chikatara on a 2-year contract. However, Chikatara later confirmed in an interview, that there had been negotiations and that the parties reached an agreement, but the deal was not concluded and it was deported quickly.

In the beginning of 2020, Chikatara then joined Bahraini club Al-Shabab Club. Later in 2020, Chikatara joined Iraqi club Naft Maysan.

=== Gokulam Kerala ===
On 3 September 2021, Chikatara signed with I-League champions Gokulam Kerala for a season.

AL BRAGA MURASSAS

in 12/2/2025 his currently playing for a libya club Al brega murassas after staying out for two (2) years because his father's death. which the contract is till end of the season.

== International career ==
Chikatara was a part of the Nigeria national team that played at the 2016 African Nations Championship. In Nigeria's first group stage match versus Niger, he was substituted on in the 58th minute and bagged a hat-trick. The match ended in a 4–1 win. He was awarded "Man of the Match". In the second group stage match against Tunisia he also came from the bench to put his name on the scoreboard before Tunisia's Ahmed Akaïchi equalised. Chikatara made a third substitute appearances in the third group stage match, a 1–0 defeat to Guinea, while Nigeria failed to proceed to the next round of the competition.

== Style of play ==
A right-footed striker, Chisom is primarily known for his pace, mobility, and athleticism as a footballer, as well as his striking power, and his strength, despite his young age;

== Career statistics ==
=== Club ===
As of match played 23 September 2021

Appearances and goals by club, season and competition
Club	Season	League			Cup		Continental		Total	
Club	Season	Division	Apps	Goals	Apps	Goals	Apps	Goals	Apps	Goals
Gokulam Kerala	2021–22	I-League	0	0	4 (Note: Appearances in Durand Cup)	3	0	0	4	3
Career total			0	0	4	3	0	0	4	3

=== International ===
Appearances and goals by national team and year
National team	Year	Apps	Goals
Nigeria	2016	4	4
Total		4	4

Scores and results list Nigeria's goal tally first, score column indicates score after each Chikatara goal.

List of international goals scored by Chisom Chikatara
No.	Date	Venue	Opponent	Score	Result	Competition
1	18 January 2016	Stade Régional Nyamirambo, Kigali, Rwanda	Niger	2–0	4–1	2016 African Nations Championship
2	18 January 2016	Stade Régional Nyamirambo, Kigali, Rwanda	Niger	3–1	4–1	2016 African Nations Championship
3	18 January 2016	Stade Régional Nyamirambo, Kigali, Rwanda	Niger	4–1	4–1	2016 African Nations Championship
4	22 January 2016	Stade Régional Nyamirambo, Kigali, Rwanda	Tunisia	1–0	1–1	2016 African Nations Championship

== Honours ==
Lists
Highest goal Scorer of the Season (Pro League): 2012–13
Best New Player: 2013–14
