= Brahim Nekkach =

Moroccan footballer

Personal information
- Full name: Brahim Nekkach
- Date of birth: May 5, 1982 (age 44)
- Place of birth: Casablanca, Morocco
- Height: 1.73 m (5 ft 8 in)
- Position: Midfielder

Team information
- Current team: Renaissance Zemamra
- Number: 6

Senior career*
Years	Team	Apps	(Gls)
2004–2009	Moghreb Tétouan		
2009–2012	ASFAR	60	(2)
2012–2014	DHJ	51	(2)
2014–2020	Wydad Casablanca	205	(1)
2020–	Renaissance Zemamra	5	(0)

International career
2015–	Morocco	8	(1)
- * Club domestic league appearances and goals

Brahim Nekkach (born May 5, 1982) was a Moroccan footballer who played as a midfielder for Wydad AC. He also has eight caps for the Morocco national team and captained them in international matches.

== Honours ==
AS FAR

- Coupe du Trône: 2009

DHJ

- Coupe du Trône: 2013

Wydad Casablanca

- Botola: 2015, 2017, 2019
- CAF Champions League: 2017; runner-up 2018–19
- CAF Super Cup: 2018
