= Ismail El Haddad =

Moroccan footballer

Personal information
- Full name: Ismail El Haddad
- Date of birth: 3 August 1990 (age 36)
- Place of birth: Casablanca, Morocco
- Height: 1.78 m (5 ft 10 in)
- Position: Winger

Youth career
- 2008–2011: Wydad Casablanca

Senior career*
Years	Team	Apps	(Gls)
2013	TAS		
2014–2015	Hassania Agadir	19	(6)
2015–2020	Wydad Casablanca	190	(32)
2021–2023	Al-Khor	28	(4)

International career^{‡}
2016–	Morocco	13	(2)
- * Club domestic league appearances and goals ‡ National team caps and goals as of 16 March 2019

Ismail El Haddad (born 3 August 1990) is a Moroccan professional footballer who plays as a winger. He is one of the fastest players in the Moroccan league. His ability with the ball in his foot is super powerful and fast inside the box. He played a very big role for Wydad Casablanca to win the CAF Champions League.

== Career ==
In December 2020, he joined Qatar Stars League club Al-Khor.

== International career ==
=== International goals ===
Scores and results list Morocco's goal tally first.

No	Date	Venue	Opponent	Score	Result	Competition
1.	10 October 2017	Tissot Arena, Biel/Bienne, Switzerland	South Korea	3–0	3–1	Friendly
2.	13 January 2018	Stade Mohammed V, Casablanca, Morocco	Mauritania	2–0	4–0	2018 African Nations Championship

== Honours ==
=== Club ===
Wydad Casablanca

- Botola: 2016-17, 2018-19
- CAF Champions League: 2017
- CAF Super Cup: 2018
