= Naïm Aarab =

Belgian footballer (born 1988)

Personal information
- Date of birth: 7 February 1988 (age 38)
- Place of birth: Brussels, Belgium
- Height: 1.89 m (6 ft 2 in)
- Position: Centre-back

Youth career
- Tubize
- Anderlecht
- NEC

Senior career*
Years	Team	Apps	(Gls)
2007–2008	NEC	6	(0)
2008–2012	AEL	52	(0)
2010–2011	→ Charleroi (loan)	29	(1)
2012–2013	Újpest	9	(0)
2013–2014	Sint-Truiden	26	(1)
2014–2016	Wydad	45	(4)
2015–2016	→ Deinze (loan)	5	(0)
2016–2017	Deinze	2	(0)
2017–2019	Wydad		
2019–2023	Tubize-Braine	19	(4)
2023–2024	RAS Saintoise		

International career
2009–2010	Belgium U21	10	(0)
- * Club domestic league appearances and goals

Naïm Aarab (born 7 February 1988) is a Belgian former professional footballer who played as a centre-back.

== Career ==
Aarab progressed through the youth ranks of Tubize and Anderlecht, before joining the reserves of Eredivisie club NEC. He signed his first professional contract − a one-year deal − with the club in 2007. Aarab made his league debut in a 5–0 loss against PSV, as an 84th-minute substitute for Jonas Olsson on 25 August 2007.

Aarab decided to leave NEC after not reaching a new agreement, and in July 2008 he joined AEL in the Super League Greece. He spent the 2010–11 season on loan at Charleroi, suffering relegation from the top division but also managing to score his first professional goal – on 23 October 2010 in a 3–2 loss to Sint-Truiden.

On 23 July 2012, Aarab joined Hungarian Nemzeti Bajnokság I side Újpest on a four-year contract.

In September 2014, Aarab signed a three-year contract with Wydad. In his first season with the Moroccan club, he only made one appearance. Wydad won the league title that season. In July 2015, he joined Deinze on loan. There, he played 5 games until his loan period was terminated prematurely in January 2016. He played no more games for the remainder of the 2015–16 season. In Morocco, Aarab struggled with injuries and at his own request he returned to Belgium in 2016 for his rehabilitation and joined Deinze on a permanent contract at the end of that year, where he played 2 matches. In 2017, Aarab returned to Wydad. With the club, he won the national title twice and won the 2017 CAF Champions League and the 2018 CAF Super Cup.

In September 2019, Aarab moved to Tubize-Braine.

== Honours ==
Wydad

- Botola: 2014–15, 2016–17, 2018–19
- CAF Champions League: 2017
- CAF Super Cup: 2018
