= Amin Tighazoui =

French footballer (born 1989)

Personal information
- Full name: Amin Tighazoui
- Date of birth: 20 April 1989 (age 37)
- Place of birth: Toul, France
- Height: 1.68 m (5 ft 6 in)
- Position: Winger

Team information
- Current team: Wydad AC
- Number: 19

Youth career
- AS Nancy

Senior career*
Years	Team	Apps	(Gls)
XXXX–2009	AS Nancy B	?	(?)
2009–2010	Jarville JF	?	(?)
2010–2011	SR Colmar	?	(?)
2011–2012	Saint-Louis Neuweg	?	(?)
2012–2014	FC Vaduz	38	(5)
2014–2015	FC Winterthur	31	(6)
2015–2017	OC Khouribga	50	(10)
2017–	Wydad AC	30	(17)
- * Club domestic league appearances and goals

Amin Tighazoui (born 20 April 1989) is a French footballer currently playing for WAC as a winger.

In January 2008 he was called up for a training camp with the French under-21 futsal team for a 4-day camp.
