= Mohammed Aoulad =

Belgian footballer

Personal information
- Full name: Mohammed Aoulad Youssef
- Date of birth: 29 August 1991 (age 35)
- Place of birth: Brussels, Belgium
- Height: 1.83 m (6 ft 0 in)
- Position: Forward

Team information
- Current team: Al-Khaldiya
- Number: 7

Youth career
- 1998–2004: Anderlecht
- 2004–2009: FC Brussels

Senior career*
Years	Team	Apps	(Gls)
2009–2012	FC Brussels	42	(19)
2012	Sporting Charleroi	10	(4)
2013	Waasland-Beveren	1	(0)
2013–2014	Sint-Truiden	29	(17)
2014–2016	KVC Westerlo	33	(13)
2016–2017	Union SG	27	(11)
2017–2018	Wydad Casablanca	17	(9)
2018–2019	Roeselare	22	(5)
2020	Tubize	4	(4)
2021–	Al-Khaldiya	18	(9)
- * Club domestic league appearances and goals as of 20:24, 1 March 2021 (UTC)

Mohammed Aoulad Youssef (born 29 August 1991) is a Belgian professional footballer who plays as a centre-forward for Al-Khaldiya in Bahrain.

== Club career ==
Aoulad made his debut for Westerlo at 26 July 2014 against Lokeren in a 1–0 home win. Previously, he played for FC Brussels, Sporting Charleroi, Waasland-Beveren and Sint-Truiden.

After a year in Morocco with Botola club Wydad Casablanca, Aoulad joined K.S.V. Roeselare, with the Belgian First Division B club announcing a two-year contract on 1 September 2018.
