= Mohamed Ounajem =

Moroccan footballer

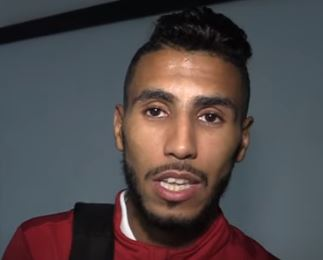
- Ounajem in 2019

Personal information
- Full name: Mohamed Ounajem
- Date of birth: 4 January 1992 (age 34)
- Place of birth: Errachidia, Morocco
- Height: 1.75 m (5 ft 9 in)
- Position: Winger

Senior career*
| Years | Team | Apps | (Gls) |
| 2013–2015 | C.A.K. | 24 | (6) |
| 2015–2019 | Wydad Casablanca | 72 | (12) |
| 2019–2022 | Zamalek | 44 | (4) |
| 2021 | → Wydad Casablanca (loan) | 21 | (2) |
| 2022–2024 | Wydad Casablanca | 34 | (1) |
| 2024–2025 | Al-Suqoor | 3 | (0) |
| 2025 | Ismailia Electricity | 10 | (2) |

International career
| 2017 | Morocco A' | 7 | (2) |
- * Club domestic league appearances and goals as of 19:15, 10 January 2026 (UTC)

Mohamed Ounajem (Arabic: محمد أوناجم; born 4 January 1992) is a Moroccan professional footballer who plays as a forward.

== Club career ==
Ounajem started his career at local side Ittihad Errachidia, before signing with Chabab Atlas Khénifra.

In January 2016, Ounajem signed a pre-contract with Wydad Casablanca for 5 years. As part of the deal, he stayed with Chabab Atlas Khénifra until the end of the season. He then went on to win several titles, including the league title, and the CAF Champions League in 2017, as well as the CAF Super Cup in 2018.

He signed for Egyptian side Zamalek in 2019, joining former teammate Achraf Bencharki. His debut came in the Egyptian Cup final against Pyramids, entering in the 62nd minute in an eventual 3–0 win. He also featured in the 2020 CAF Super Cup against Espérance de Tunis, entering as a late substitute for Mostafa Mohamed as the Egyptians secured the title.

He signed for his former club in 2022, in time for the CAF Super Cup against fellow Moroccan side RS Berkane, which Wydad lost 2–0.

== International career ==
Ounajem made his debut for Morocco on 15 June 2015, coming on as a 76th-minute substitute for Zakaria Hadraf. He scored his first goal for Morocco in the 4–0 thrashing of Libya on 22 October 2015.

== Career statistics ==
=== International ===
As of matches played 11 April 2017.

| National team | Year | Apps | Goals |
|---|---|---|---|
| Morocco | 2015 | 4 | 2 |
| Morocco | 2016 | 3 | 0 |
| Morocco | 2017 | 0 | 0 |
| Total | | 7 | 2 |

=== International goals ===
Scores and results list Morocco's goal tally first.

| No | Date | Venue | Opponent | Score | Result | Competition |
|---|---|---|---|---|---|---|
| 1. | 22 October 2015 | Stade Olympique de Radès, Radès, Tunisia | Libya | 4–0 | 4–0 | 2016 African Nations Championship qualification |
| 2. | 25 October 2015 | Stade Olympique de Radès, Radès, Tunisia | Tunisia | 3–2 | 3–2 | 2016 African Nations Championship qualification |

== Honours ==
Wydad Casablanca

- Botola: 2016–17, 2018–19, 2020–21
- CAF Champions League: 2017 runner-up: 2019, 2023
- CAF Super Cup: 2018
- African Football League runner-up: 2023

Zamalek

- Egyptian Premier League: 2021–22
- Egypt Cup: 2018–19, 2020–21
- Egyptian Super Cup: 2019–20
- CAF Super Cup: 2020
- CAF Champions League runner-up: 2020

Individual

- CAF Team of the Year: 2017
- Botola Team of the Season: 2020–21
