= Alejandro Quintana =

Argentine footballer (born 1992)

Personal information
- Full name: Alejandro Gabriel Quintana
- Date of birth: 20 February 1992 (age 34)
- Place of birth: Buenos Aires, Argentina
- Height: 1.90 m (6 ft 3 in)
- Position: Forward

Team information
- Current team: Atlanta

Youth career
- 2007–2008: Huracán

Senior career*
Years	Team	Apps	(Gls)
2009–2014	Huracán	21	(4)
2014	Tristán Suárez	17	(7)
2015–2016	Brown de Adrogué	49	(20)
2016–2017	Platense	25	(11)
2017	Universitario de Sucre	20	(6)
2017	Blooming	19	(6)
2018	Wydad Casablanca	13	(3)
2018–2019	Cafetaleros	11	(1)
2019	Sport Boys	20	(7)
2020	Guabirá	22	(10)
2021	Atlético Bucaramanga	29	(7)
2022	América de Cali	24	(3)
2023	Orense	8	(1)
2024	Guabirá	48	(9)
2025–2026	Gimnasia Jujuy	36	(9)
2026–	Atlanta	9	(2)
- * Club domestic league appearances and goals as of 16:41, 24 April 2026 (UTC)

Alejandro Gabriel Quintana (born 20 February 1992) is an Argentine professional footballer who plays as a forward for Argentine club Atlanta.

== Career ==
Quintana was born in Buenos Aires, Argentina. He debuted for Club Atlético Huracán in Parque Patricios, Buenos Aires. With "El Globo" he scored four goals in 21 appearances.

His best season was with Club Atlético Brown, where he scored 20 goals in 49 appearances from 2015 to 2016.

In January 2018, Quintana joined reigning African champions Wydad Casablanca.

== Clubs ==
Updated to the last match played on 4 July 2025.

Club	Country	Years	Apps	Goals
Huracán	Argentina	2009–2014	21	4
Tristán Suárez	Argentina	2014	17	1
Brown de Adrogué	Argentina	2015–2016	50	11
Platense	Argentina	2016	9	0
Universitario de Sucre	Bolivia	2017	22	7
Blooming	Bolivia	2017	19	6
Wydad AC	Morocco	2018	2	0
Cafetaleros	Mexico	2018–2019	15	1
Sport Boys Warnes	Bolivia	2019	20	7
Guabirá	Bolivia	2020	22	10
Atlético Bucaramanga	Colombia	2021	31	9
América de Cali	Colombia	2022	27	3
Orense S.C	Ecuador	2023	8	1
Guabirá	Bolivia	2023–2025	49	9
Gimnasia y Esgrima (Jujuy)	Argentina	2025–present	19	6
Career total			371	83
