= Zouhair Laaroubi =

Moroccan footballer

Personal information
- Full name: Zouhair Laaroubi
- Date of birth: 30 July 1984 (age 42)
- Place of birth: Kenitra, Morocco
- Height: 1.81 m (5 ft 11 in)
- Position: Goalkeeper

Youth career
- 2004–05: KAC Kénitra

Senior career*
Years	Team	Apps	(Gls)
2005–2012	KAC Kénitra		
2012–2015	Difaâ Hassani El Jadidi	50	(0)
2015–2018	Wydad AC	67	(0)
2018–2019	Ohod Club	16	(0)
2019	Moghreb Tétouan	12	(0)
2019–2021	RS Berkane	41	(0)
2021–2022	Maghreb de Fès	4	(0)
2023	IR Tanger	1	(0)

International career
2014	Morocco A	1	(0)
- * Club domestic league appearances and goals

Zouhair Laaroubi (Arabic: زهير لعروبي; born 20 July 1984) is a Moroccan former professional footballer who played as a goalkeeper.

== Career ==
Laaroubi started his career playing for KAC Kénitra. Later on, he played for Difaâ Hassani El Jadidi and Wydad AC, before joining Saudi Ohod Club in 2018. He later returned to Morocco to join Moghreb Tétouan and RS Berkane. In August 2021, he joined Maghreb de Fès.

== Honours ==
Difaâ Hassani El Jadidi

- Moroccan Throne Cup: 2013

Wydad AC

- Botola: 2016–17
- CAF Champions League: 2017
- CAF Super Cup: 2018

RS Berkane

- CAF Confederation Cup: 2020
