= Yassine El Kharroubi =

Footballer (born 1990)

Personal information
- Full name: Yassine El Kharroubi
- Date of birth: 29 March 1990 (age 36)
- Place of birth: Dreux, France
- Height: 1.91 m (6 ft 3 in)
- Position: Goalkeeper

Senior career*
Years	Team	Apps	(Gls)
2008–2010	Guingamp B	5	(0)
2010–2011	Guingamp	4	(0)
2011–2012	Quevilly	25	(0)
2012–2013	Bourg-Péronnas	10	(0)
2013–2014	Maghreb de Fès	9	(0)
2014–2015	Vereya	18	(0)
2015–2017	Lokomotiv Plovdiv	48	(0)
2017–2020	Wydad AC	7	(0)
2020–2021	Versailles	4	(0)

International career
2011–2012	Morocco U23	4	(0)
2016–2017	Morocco	2	(0)
- * Club domestic league appearances and goals as of 06:02, 21 May 2022 (UTC)

Yassine El Kharroubi (born 29 March 1990), is a professional footballer who plays as a goalkeeper. Born in France, he is a former player of the Morocco national team.

== Club career ==
El Kharroubi was born in France to parents of Moroccan descent. He began his career at Guingamp, playing only four league games for the senior squad. In 2011, he joined Quevilly. He signed with A PFG team Lokomotiv Plovdiv in the summer of 2015.

On 29 July 2017, El Kharroubi signed a three-year contract with Wydad AC. He returned to France in January 2020, signing with Versailles.

== International career ==
In May 2016, El Kharroubi was called up to the Morocco national team for the first time ahead of a friendly against Congo and a 2017 Africa Cup of Nations qualifying match against Libya. On 27 May, against Congo he played full 90 minutes.

In December 2016, El Kharroubi was named in Morocco's 23-man squad for 2017 Africa Cup of Nations, but did not play in any of Morocco's four games at the tournament.

== Honours ==
Quevilly

- Coupe de France runner-up: 2011–12
