= Jamel Aït Ben Idir =

Moroccan footballer (born 1984)

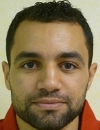
- Aït Ben Idir in 2013

Personal information
- Full name: Jamel Aït Ben Idir
- Date of birth: 10 January 1984 (age 42)
- Place of birth: Mont-Saint-Aignan, France
- Height: 1.73 m (5 ft 8 in)
- Position: Midfielder

Youth career
- 2000–2003: Le Havre B

Senior career*
Years	Team	Apps	(Gls)
2003–2010	Le Havre	211	(6)
2010–2012	Arles-Avignon	60	(0)
2012–2013	Sedan	21	(0)
2013–2015	Auxerre	63	(1)
2015–2019	Wydad AC	37	(0)
2019	FUS Rabat	6	(0)
Total		398	(7)

International career
2003	France U19		
2014	Morocco	3	(0)
- * Club domestic league appearances and goals

Jamel Aït Ben Idir (born 10 January 1984) is a former professional footballer who played as a midfielder. Born in France, he represented Morocco at international level.

== Career ==
Born in Mont-Saint-Aignan, Aït Ben Idir joined Le Havre in 2000 as a youth player. He made his professional debut for the club in a Ligue 2 match on 26 March 2002 against AC Ajaccio playing the full 90 minutes in a 1–0 loss. Following promotion that season, Ait-Ben-Idir did not feature in Ligue 1 play that season only appearing in one match. He would proceed to become a regular in the squad the next five seasons contributing to Le Havre's return to Ligue 1 for the 2008–09 season. He then moved on to AC Arles-Avignon, Sedan, and Ligue 2 club AJ Auxerre.

After the expiration of his Auxerre contract, Aït Ben Idir joined Wydad Casablanca on a two-year deal.
