= Salaheddine Saidi =

Moroccan footballer

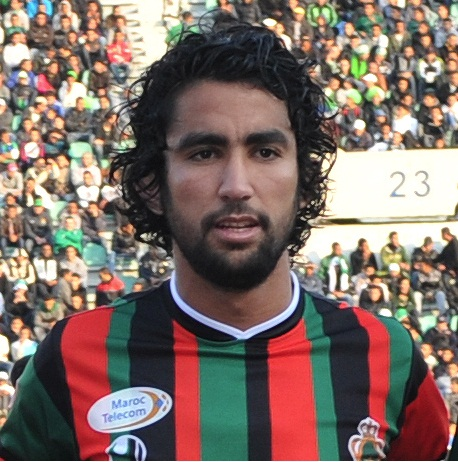
- Saidi with AS FAR in 2012

Personal information
- Date of birth: 6 February 1987 (age 39)
- Place of birth: Marrakesh, Morocco
- Height: 1.85 m (6 ft 1 in)
- Position: Defensive midfielder

Senior career*
Years	Team	Apps	(Gls)
2004–2011	Kawkab Marrakech	45	(1)
2011–2013	FAR Rabat	41	(0)
2014	Dubai CSC	12	(0)
2014–2021	Wydad AC	140	(11)

International career
2011–2019	Morocco	18	(1)
Medal record
Men's football
Representing Morocco
FIFA Arab Cup
Winner	2012 Saudi Arabia
African Nations Championship
Winner	2018 Morocco
- * Club domestic league appearances and goals

Salaheddine Saidi (Arabic: صلاح الدين السعيدي; born 6 February 1987) is a Moroccan former professional footballer who played as a defensive midfielder. He made 18 appearances for the Morocco national team, scoring once.

== Career statistics ==
Scores and results list Morocco's goal tally first.

No	Date	Venue	Opponent	Score	Result	Competition
1.	27 January 2018	Stade Mohamed V, Casablanca, Morocco	Namibia	2–0	2–0	2018 African Nations Championship

== Honours ==
Wydad AC

- Botola: 2014–15, 2016–17, 2018–19, 2020–21
- CAF Champions League: 2017
- CAF Super Cup: 2018

Morocco A'

- Arab Cup: 2012
- African Nations Championship: 2018, 2020
