= Abdelatif Noussir =

Moroccan footballer (born 1990)

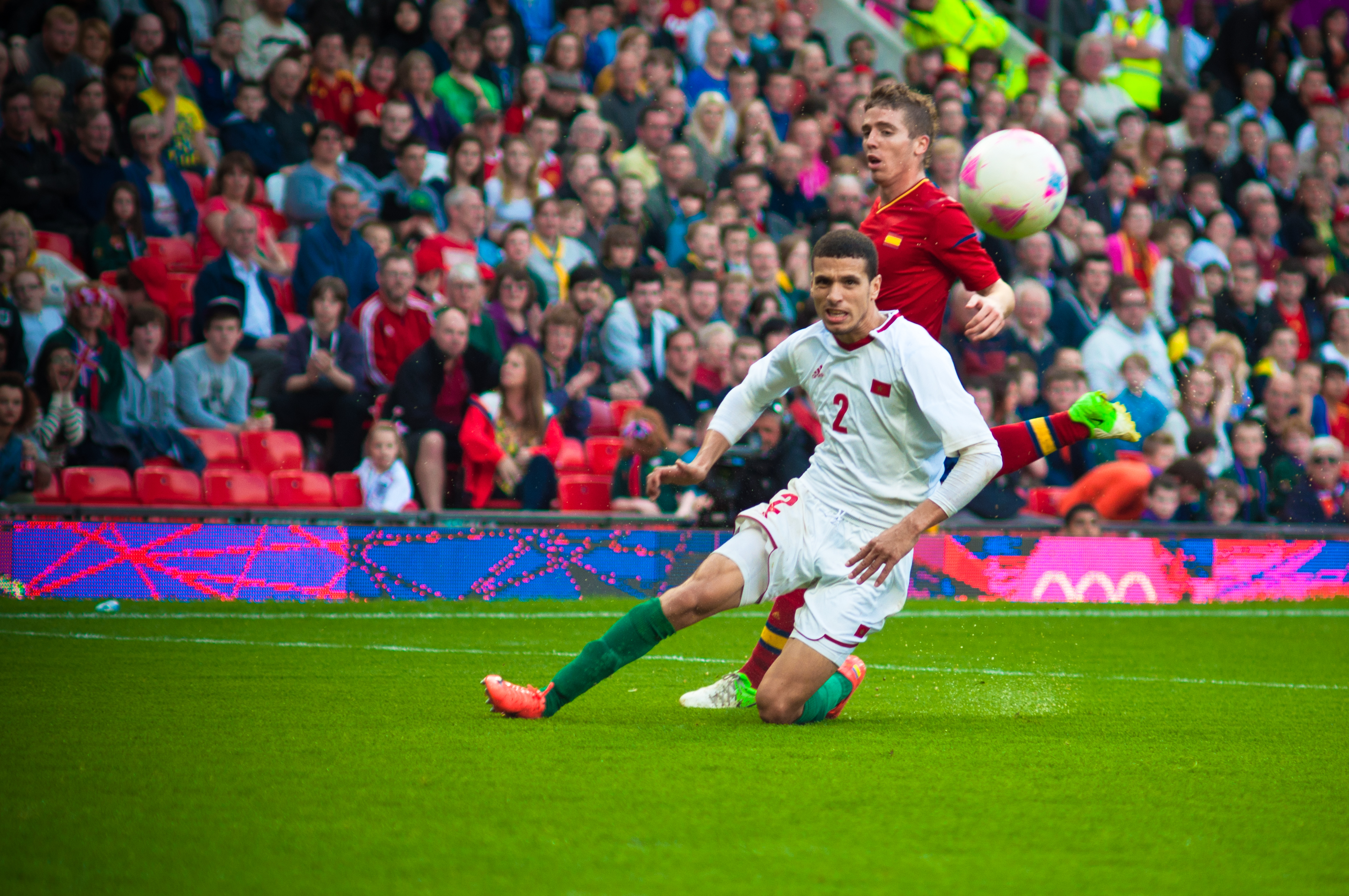
- Noussir (in white) defending the ball from Iker Muniain at the 2012 Summer Olympics

Personal information
- Full name: Abdelatif Noussir
- Date of birth: 20 February 1990 (age 36)
- Place of birth: Mohammedia, Morocco
- Height: 1.81 m (5 ft 11 in)
- Position: Right back

Team information
- Current team: IR Tanger
- Number: 28

Senior career*
Years	Team	Apps	(Gls)
2009–2010	MAS Fes	7	(0)
2010–2012	FUS Rabat	30	(0)
2012–2014	MAS Fes	57	(0)
2014–2021	Wydad AC	207	(9)
2021	Moghreb Tétouan	22	(1)
2021–	IR Tanger	24	(0)

International career^{‡}
2010	Morocco U21	18	(0)
2012–2013	Morocco	8	(0)
- * Club domestic league appearances and goals as of 15 April 2023 ‡ National team caps and goals as of 26 January 2015

Abdelatif Noussir (Arabic: عبد اللطيف نصير; born 20 February 1990, in Mohammedia) is a Moroccan footballer who plays for IR Tanger and represented the Morocco under 23 football team. He also played for Morocco at the 2012 Summer Olympics.

== Honours ==
FUS

- CAF Confederation Cup: 2010

Wydad AC

- Botola: 2015, 2017, 2019
- CAF Super Cup: 2018
- CAF Champions League: 2017

== See also ==
- Morocco national under-23 football team
