= Youssef Rabeh =

Moroccan footballer (born 1985)

Personal information
- Full name: Youssef Rabeh
- Date of birth: 13 April 1985 (age 41)
- Place of birth: Rabat, Morocco
- Height: 1.83 m (6 ft 0 in)
- Position: Defender

Senior career*
Years	Team	Apps	(Gls)
2003–2005	FUS Rabat		
2005–2006	Al-Ahli Jeddah		
2006	FUS Rabat		
2006–2007	FAR Rabat		
2007–2009	Levski Sofia	57	(0)
2010	Anzhi Makhachkala	0	(0)
2010–2011	Moghreb Tétouan	19	(1)
2011– 2017	Wydad AC	158	(1)

International career^{‡}
2008–	Morocco	6	(0)
- * Club domestic league appearances and goals as of 14 June 2015 ‡ National team caps and goals as of 20 March 2017

Youssef Rabeh (Arabic: يوسف رابح; born 13 April 1985 in Rabat) is a former Moroccan football player, who played mainly for Wydad AC.

== Career ==
He is born in the capital of the Morocco Rabat and started his career in local team FUS de Rabat. In 2005 Rabeh signed for one year with Al-Ahli (Jeddah) from Saudi Arabia. In 2006 Youssef returned in FUS de Rabat for six months. In season 2006/2007 played in other club from Rabat - FAR. With this team Rabeh play final on CAF Confederation Cup in 2006 and is a vice-champion on Morocco in 2007.

=== Levski Sofia ===
On 29 July 2007 signed with Levski Sofia.

Rabeh had a few problem with police in Bulgaria, after some incidents in night clubs.

He became a Champion of Bulgaria in 2009.

On 15 August 2009, Rabeh was suspended from the first team after an arrest for drink related incident. However, after a poor performance of Levski's defense, he was allowed to return to the first team.

Rabeh became famous with his non-observance of the regime in Levski, which caused him to be transferred in Russian club Anzhi. Still, during his stay with the Bulgarian side, he received praise for his fine defensive skills and was nicknamed the "Moroccan Beckenbauer".

=== Anzhi Makhachkala ===
On 8 February 2010, Levski transferred the Moroccan defender to FC Anzhi Makhachkala; he signed a three-year deal. Rabeh made his debut for the team from Daghestan in the 1:2 loss against Slavia Sofia in a friendly match, earning himself a booking for a foul on Petar Dimitrov. The match was abandoned in the 60th minute, following a number of complaints from FC Anzhi Makhachkala against referee decisions. Rabeh's disciplinary woes continued, as he purportedly ran away from his new team's training camp and refused to return. Moreover, he had allegedly borrowed some money from would-be teammate Todor Timonov just before leaving Daghestan, and did not repay him. Thus, he did not make a single official appearance for the Daghestani side and eventually returned to Morocco.

== International career ==
In 2005, he got to semi-final on FIFA U-20 World Cup with Morocco U20. He earned his first cap with the Atlas Lions in the 4–1 victory over Mauritania on 11 October 2008.

== Personal life ==
Rabeh was involved in several off-the-field incidents during his spell with Levski Sofia, including a three-year suspended prison sentence for drunk driving.

== Awards ==
Levski Sofia

- Champion of Bulgaria 2009
- Bulgarian Supercup 2009

FAR

- CAF Confederation Cup2006 : Runner-up

Wydad Casablanca

- CAF Champions League 2017: Winner
- CAF Champions League 2011: Runner-up
- CAF Champions League 2016 : Semi-Final
- Botola 2014-2015 : Winner
- Botola 2015-2016: Runner-up

Moroccan u-21

- 2005 FIFA World Youth Championship: Fourth place
