= Abdeladim Khadrouf =

Moroccan footballer (born 1985)

Personal information
- Full name: Abdeladim Khadrouf
- Date of birth: 3 January 1985 (age 41)
- Place of birth: Berkane, Morocco
- Height: 1.83 m (6 ft 0 in)
- Position: Midfielder

Team information
- Current team: MAS Fez

Senior career*
| Years | Team | Apps | (Gls) |
| 2010–2016 | Moghreb Tétouan | 90 | (30) |
| 2016–2018 | Wydad Casablanca | 31 | (4) |
| 2018 | Raja Casablanca | 14 | (1) |
| 2018–2019 | CR Al Hoceima | 21 | (5) |
| 2019– | MAS Fez | | |

International career^{‡}
| 2012– | Morocco | 11 | (2) |
- * Club domestic league appearances and goals as of 08:36, 9 February 2016 (UTC) ‡ National team caps and goals as of 08:36, 20 March 2017 (UTC)

Abdeladim Khadrouf (born 3 January 1985) is a Moroccan footballer who plays for MAS Fez.

== International career ==
=== International goals ===
Scores and results list Morocco's goal tally first.

| No | Date | Venue | Opponent | Score | Result | Competition |
|---|---|---|---|---|---|---|
| 1. | 25 October 2015 | Stade Olympique de Radès, Radès, Tunisia | Tunisia | 1–0 | 3–2 | 2016 African Nations Championship qualification |
| 2. | 24 January 2016 | Amahoro Stadium, Kigali, Rwanda | Rwanda | 3–1 | 4–1 | 2016 African Nations Championship |
