= Stade Mohammed V =

Stadium in Casablanca, Morocco

Coordinates: 33°34′58″N 7°38′49″W

- ملعب محمد الخامس
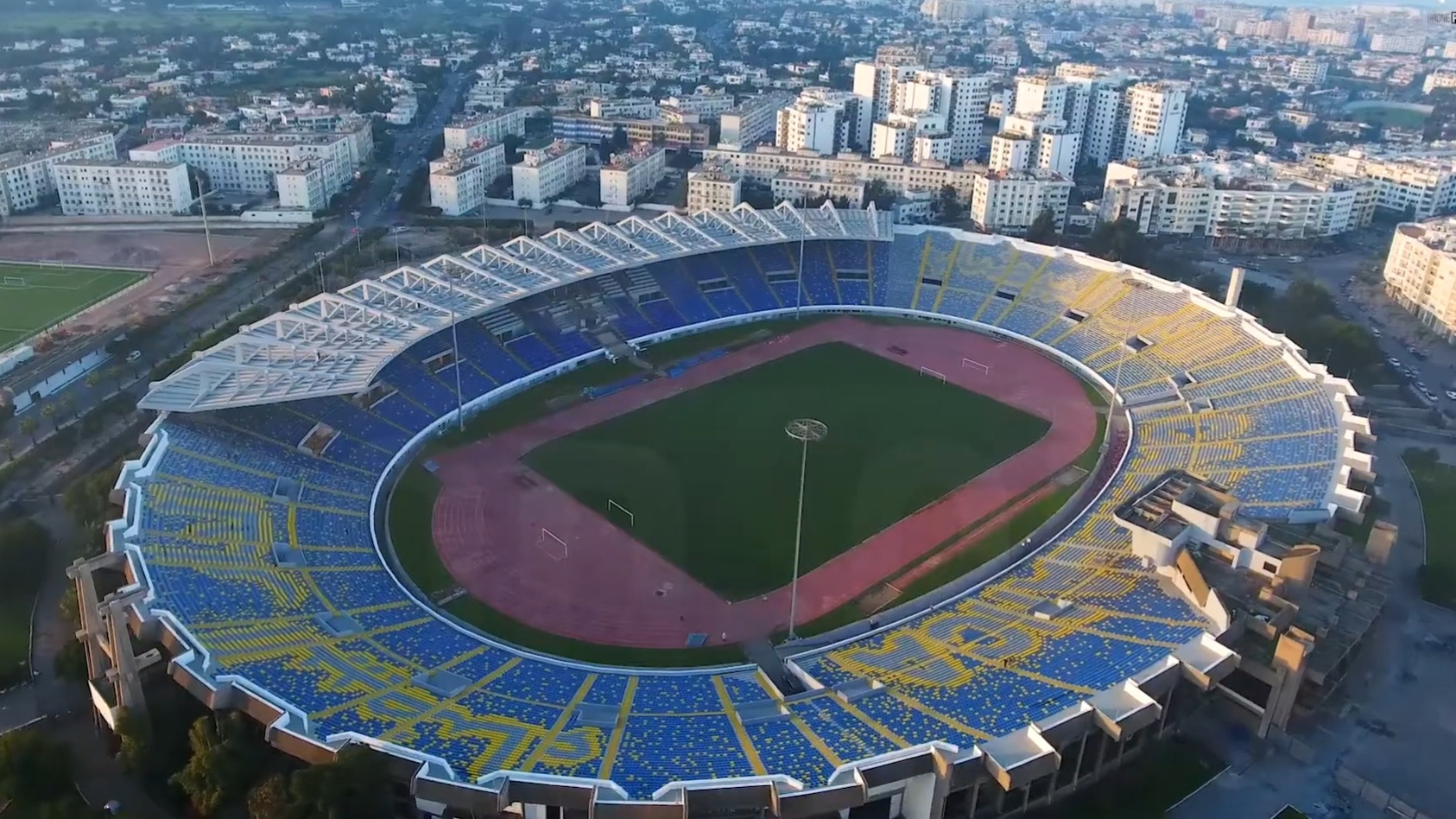
- Interactive map of Stade Mohammed V
- Former names: Stade Marcel Cerdan (1955–1956); Stade d'Honneur (1956–1981)
- Address: Rue al-Azrak Ahmed
- Location: Maârif, Casablanca, Morocco
- Owner: City of Casablanca
- Capacity: 45,000
- Surface: Grass
- Record attendance: 110,000: Casablanca derby (1997); Morocco vs Ghana (1997)
- Field size: 105 m × 68 m

Construction
- Opened: 6 March 1955
- Renovated: 1981, 2000, 2007, 2015, 2024–2025

Tenants
- Raja Casablanca (1955–present); Wydad Casablanca (1955–present); Morocco national football team

Stade Mohammed V (Arabic: ملعب محمد الخامس, romanized: Malʿab Muḥammad al-Khāmis) is a multi-purpose stadium is situated in the western part of the Maârif neighborhood of central Casablanca, Morocco. The stadium has a seating capacity of 45,000 and it is the oldest football stadium in Morocco.

It was inaugurated on March 6, 1955 under the name of Stade Marcel Cerdan, in homage to the famous Franco-Moroccan world champion boxer, before being renamed Stade d'Honneur ("Stadium of Honor") a year later. It received its current name on the occasion of the 1983 Mediterranean Games organized in Casablanca, after Mohammed V, Sultan of the Cherifian Empire from 1927 to 1957 and King of Morocco from 1957 to 1962.

It primarily hosts association football matches, serving as the home ground of the Morocco national football team and local rival football clubs Wydad AC and Raja CA. In 1997, the stadium set a record of attendance of 110,000 during the Casablanca football derby and a match between the Moroccan and Ghanaian national teams. The same record attendance was repeated during Morocco's match against Argentina in 2004.

== History ==
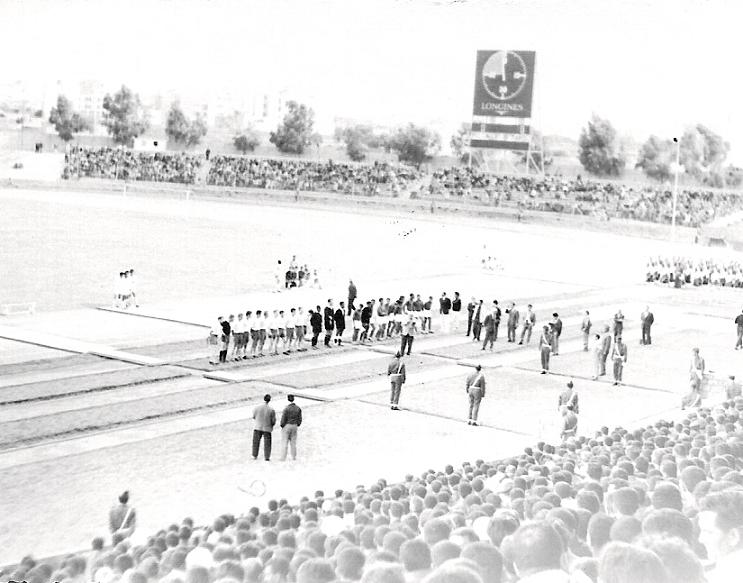
The stadium at the 1961 Pan-Arab Games

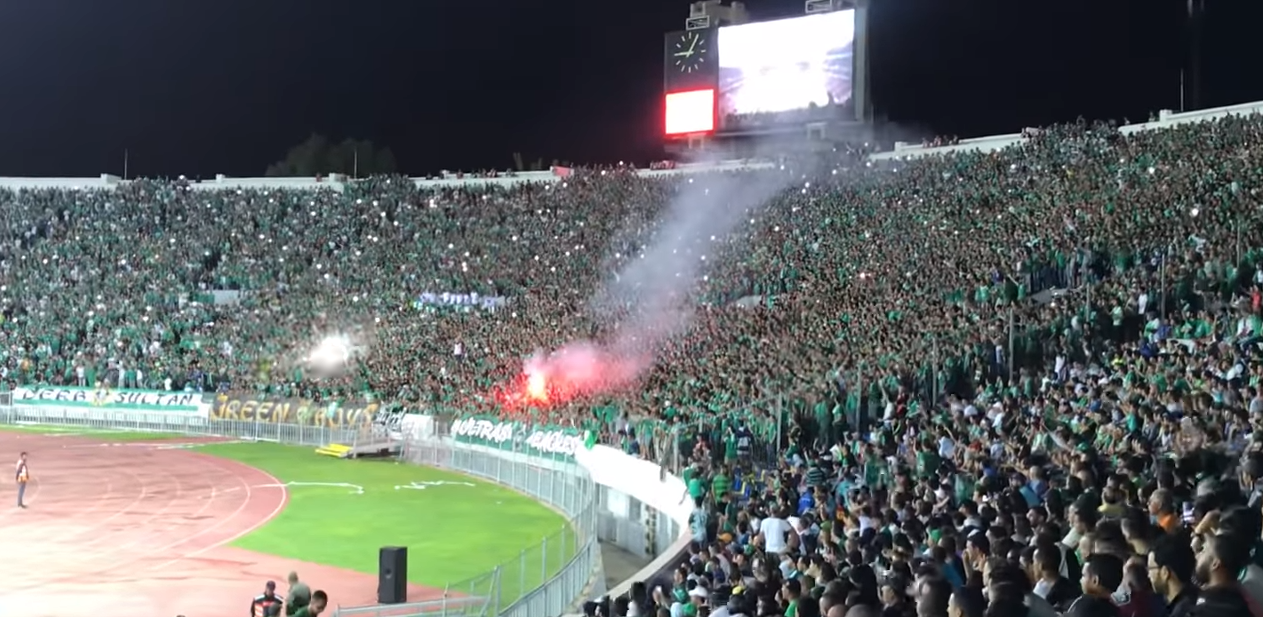
The "Magana Stand"

On March 6, 1955, the stadium was inaugurated under the name Stade Marcel Cerdan in honour of the French boxer, with a capacity of 30,000. The following year, after the independence of Morocco, it took the name of Stade d'Honneur. This stadium witnessed Morocco qualify for the 1970 FIFA World Cup, which was their first ever World Cup.

At the end of the 1970s, in preparation for the 1983 Mediterranean Games which were held in Casablanca, the stadium was closed for a major renovation; with an increase of the seating capacity, installation of an electronic scoreboard and construction of a 12,000-capacity indoor gymnasium and a 3,000-capacity Olympic-sized swimming pool around the stadium. It reopened in 1981 under its current name, Stade Mohammed V.

Today, the complex has the stadium itself, the gymnasium, the swimming pool, a 650 m^{2} media centre, a conference room, a meeting room, a care centre, and an anti-doping centre.

Stade Mohammed V is located right in the centre of Casablanca. The international airport in Casablanca, also named after Mohammed V, is 25 kilometres from the stadium and the Casa-Voyageurs rail station is 5 kilometres from the stadium. The stadium has a parking lot with a capacity of 1,000 cars.

In the 2006–07 season, the stadium was renovated again with the inclusion of a semi-artificial lawn of a high standard. It reopened in April 2007.

A reform agreement was signed in 2015 between the Ministry of Youth and Sports, Royal Moroccan Football Federation, the Casablanca City Council and the Ministry of the Interior, allocating a budget of 220 million Moroccan dirhams.

This amount was mainly allocated to rehabilitate the stadium to meet international standards, such as the quality of the chairs, grass and other equipment of the other facilities, including the electronic clock, clothing stores, rest areas, the press platform and the corridors, in addition to repairs in its surroundings.

Currently, Stade Mohammed V is built on an area of 12 hectares (12,262 square metres), and is considered a masterpiece of Moroccan sports, as it accommodates about 80,000 spectators and includes a large sports hall containing 12,000 seats, and includes facilities for many sports, such as basketball, handball, volleyball, gymnastics, and boxing, and an Olympic swimming pool.

In July, it was announced that Stade Mohammed V was among the six stadiums which would benefit from a rehabilitation program with a view to the 2025 Africa Cup of Nations. This vast project which will be carried out by SONARGES includes the removal of the athletics track and an extension of the stands in order to bring it into compliance with FIFA standards.

Stade Mohammed V is set to make history for hosting the first-ever African Football League final.

On 1 November 2023, Abdel Latif Naciri, Vice President of the Casablanca Community Council, confirmed that Stade Mohammed V will undergo a rehabilitation process immediately after the end of the African League competitions.

== Usage ==
=== Matches ===
Date	Team #1	Result	Team #2	Competition
6 October 1985	Morocco	3–0	Libya	1986 FIFA World Cup qualification
10 October 1993	Morocco	1–0	Zambia	1994 FIFA World Cup qualification
28 April 2004	Morocco	0–1	Argentina	Friendly
29 March 2022	Morocco	4–1	DR Congo	2022 FIFA World Cup qualification
22 December 2025	Mali	1–1	Zambia	2025 Africa Cup of Nations
24 December 2025	Burkina Faso	2–1	Equatorial Guinea	2025 Africa Cup of Nations
26 December 2025	Zambia	0–0	Comoros	2025 Africa Cup of Nations
28 December 2025	Equatorial Guinea	0–1	Sudan	2025 Africa Cup of Nations
29 December 2025	Comoros	0–0	Mali	2025 Africa Cup of Nations
31 December 2025	Sudan	0–2	Burkina Faso	2025 Africa Cup of Nations
3 January 2026	Mali	1–1 (a.e.t.) (3–2 p)	Tunisia	2025 Africa Cup of Nations
17 January 2026	Egypt	0–0 (2–4 p)	Nigeria	2025 Africa Cup of Nations

=== International events ===
The stadium hosted the following international events:

- 1983 Mediterranean Games
- 1983 Palestine Cup of Nations for Youth
- 1988 African Cup of Nations final
- 1998 CAF Super Cup
- 2000 CAF Super Cup
- 2015 African Amateur Boxing Championships
- 2017 CAF Champions League Final
- 2018 CAF Super Cup
- 2018 African Nations Championship Final
- 2021 CAF Champions League Final
- 2022 CAF Champions League Final
- 2023 CAF Champions League final Second leg
- 2023 African Football League final first leg
- 2025 Africa Cup of Nations

== Incident ==
- On 21 March 2016, Two people were killed in a fight among Raja CA fans during a match against Chabab Rif Al Hoceima.
- On 29 April 2023, A 29 year old woman died near the stadium during the 2022–23 CAF Champions League quarter-final between Raja CA and Al Ahly SC.

== See also ==
- List of African stadiums by capacity
- List of football stadiums in Morocco
- Lists of stadiums

Preceded by Cairo International Stadium; Cairo	African Cup of Nations; Final Venue; 1988	Succeeded by Stade 5 Juillet; Algiers
