= 2018 CAF Champions League final =

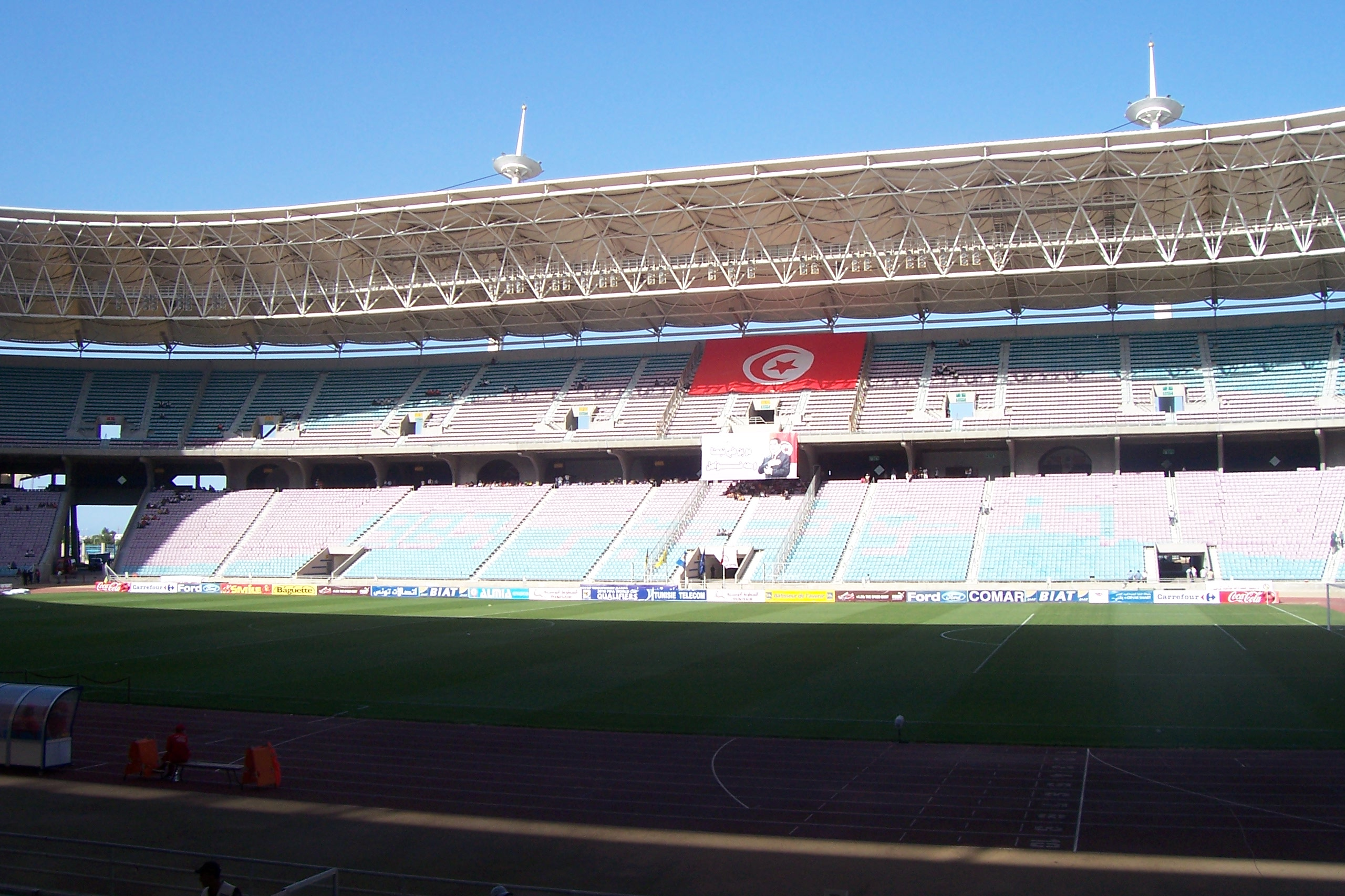
- 7 November Stadium hosted the podium where ES Tunis lifted the trophy
- Event: 2018 CAF Champions League
Al Ahly	Espérance de Tunis
(Egypt)	(Tunisia)
3	4
- on aggregate

First leg
Al Ahly	Espérance de Tunis
3	1
- Date: 2 November 2018
- Venue: Borg El Arab Stadium, Alexandria
- Referee: Mehdi Abid Charef (Algeria)
- Attendance: 60,000
- Weather: Partly Cloudy; 23 °C (73 °F)

Second leg
Espérance de Tunis	Al Ahly
3	0
- Date: 9 November 2018
- Venue: Stade Olympique de Radès, Tunis
- Referee: Bamlak Tessema Weyesa (Ethiopia)
- Attendance: 60,000

The 2018 CAF Champions League final was the final of the 2018 CAF Champions League, the 54th edition of Africa's premier club football tournament organized by the Confederation of African Football (CAF), and the 22nd edition under the current CAF Champions League title.

The final was contested in two-legged home-and-away format between Al Ahly from Egypt and Espérance de Tunis from Tunisia. The first leg was hosted by Al-Ahly on 2 November 2018, while the second leg was hosted by Espérance de Tunis at the Stade Olympique de Radès in Radès on 9 November 2018.

Espérance de Tunis won the final 4–3 on aggregate for their third CAF Champions League title. As winners, they earned the right to represent the CAF at the 2018 FIFA Club World Cup, entering at the second round, as well as play in the 2019 CAF Super Cup against the winner of the 2018 CAF Confederation Cup.

== Teams ==
In the following table, finals until 1996 were in the African Cup of Champions Club era, since 1997 were in the CAF Champions League era.

Team	Zone	Previous finals appearances (bold indicates winners)
(Egypt) Al Ahly	UNAF (North Africa)	11 (**1982**, 1983, **1987**, **2001**, **2005**, **2006**, 2007, **2008**, **2012**, **2013**, 2017)
(Tunisia) Espérance de Tunis	UNAF (North Africa)	6 (**1994**, 1999, 2000, 2010, **2011**, 2012)

== Background ==
Al-Ahly are the most successful club in Egypt and Africa with eight titles, winning eight (1982, 1987, 2001, 2005, 2006, 2008, 2012, 2013) and losing three (1983, 2007, 2017). Al-Ahly were playing their twelfth and second consecutive final.

Espérance de Tunis had reached the final six times before, more than any other Tunisian side, winning two (1994, 2011) and losing four (1999, 2000, 2010, 2012). Espérance de Tunis were playing their seventh final and the first since 2012.

The two sides had previously played 18 matches in African competitions. The first meetings between the two sides took place in the 1990 African Cup of Champions Clubs round of 16, where Espérance de Tunis beat Al-Ahly on penalties after the home and away matches ended 0–0. The most recent meetings between the clubs had taken place in the 2018 CAF Champions League group stage, where Al-Ahly's home match ended 0–0, and then Espérance de Tunis lost 0–1 at home to Al-Ahly on a Walid Azaro goal.

== Venues ==
=== Borg El Arab Stadium ===
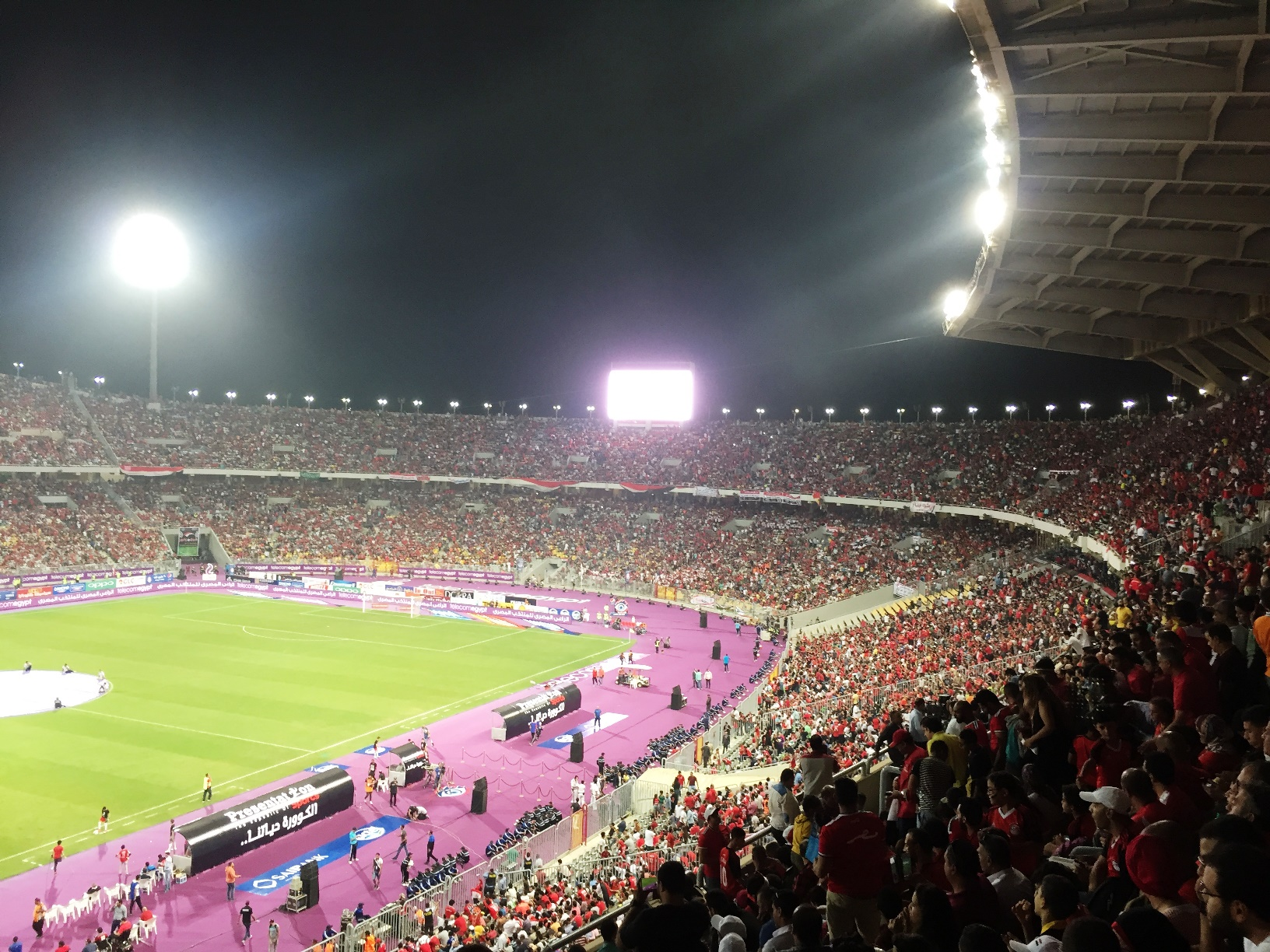
Borg El Arab Stadium in Alexandria, Egypt hosted the first leg.

The Borg El Arab Stadium is a stadium commissioned in 2006 in the Mediterranean Sea resort of Borg El Arab; 25 km west of Alexandria, Egypt. It is the largest stadium in Egypt and the second largest in Africa (after FNB Stadium in Johannesburg) with a capacity of 86,000 and is an all-seater. It is also the 27th largest stadium in the world, and the 9th largest association football stadium in the world. It is located on the Cairo-Alexandria desert highway 10 km from Borg El Arab Airport and 15 km from Alexandria's city centre. A running track runs around the pitch, and the ground has four large floodlights. Only one stand is covered by a roof.

The stadium is 145 feddans, is surrounded by a fence which is 3 km long, an internal road network its long is 6 km, a parking lot which could fit 5000 cars and 200 bus beside an airstrip, there are 136 electronic entrances. The main cabin is covered by an umbrella which covers 35% of the stadium total area, and it is considered the biggest umbrella in the Middle East. Its length is 200 m, its dimension is 60 m and its area is 12,000 m^{2}, which is equal to 3 feddans.

The stadium is air-conditioned and that condition includes the clothes chambers, the salons and entrances, also the stadium includes 8 elevators for broadcasters, handicapped, services and important persons. There are 2 sub-stadiums for training and each ground can hold 2000 spectators, includes 2 locker rooms and a stadium for Athletics. The stadium also includes a hotel for 200 guests which is air-conditioned and has a swimming pool, gym and a department building which contains 80 people. The stadium includes a building which contains 300 presses. This building includes cabinets for broadcasters, entrances for emergency, ambulance cars, 39 and cafeterias, 337 bathrooms which classified to 33 bathrooms for women and 8 bathrooms for the handicapped.

=== Stade Olympique de Radès ===
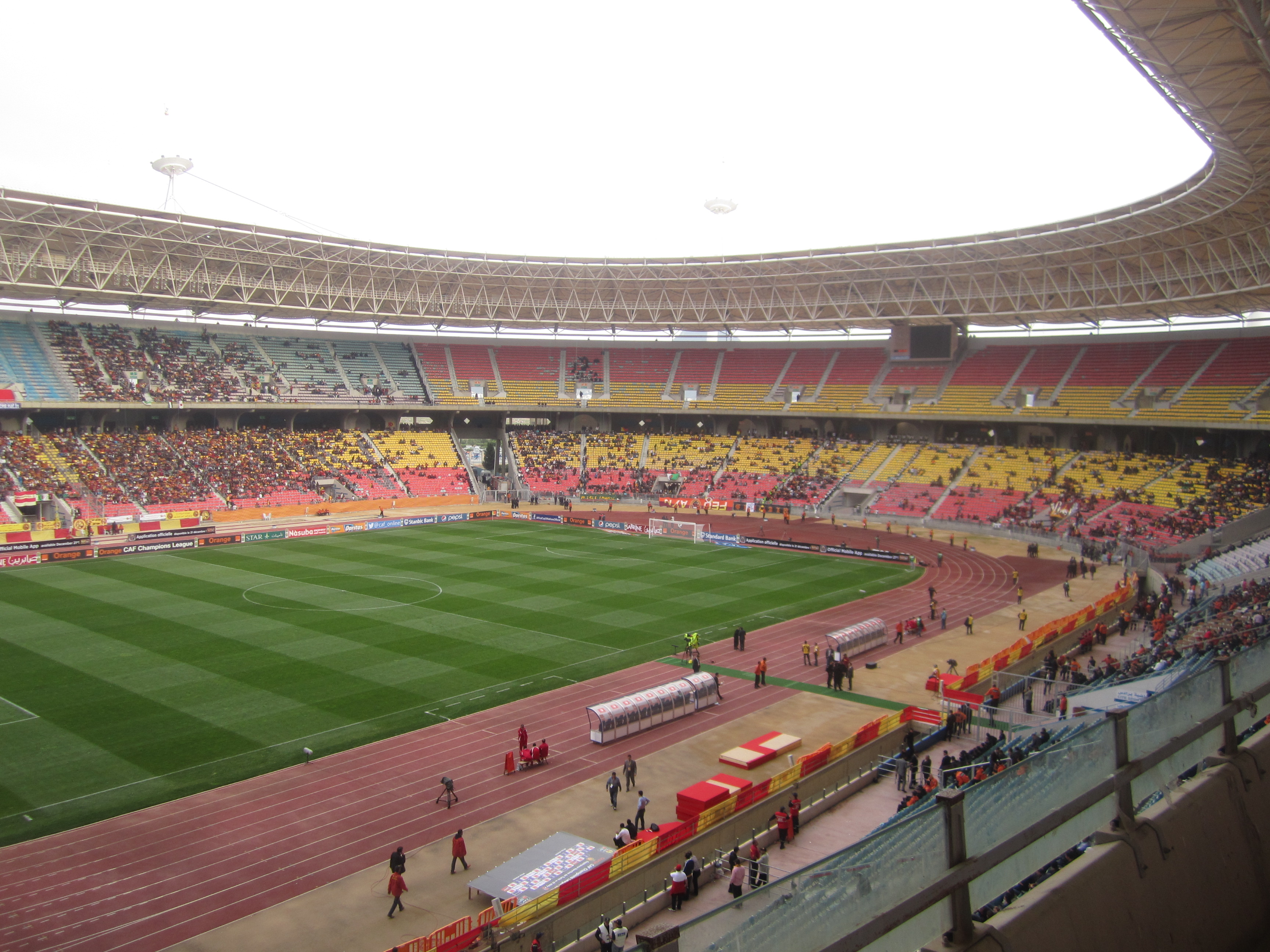
Stade Olympique de Radès in Radès, Tunisia hosted the second leg.

The Stade Olympique de Radès is a multi-purpose stadium in Radès, Tunisia about 10 kilometers south-east of the city center of Tunis, in the center of the Olympic City. It is currently used mostly for football matches and it also has facilities for athletics. The stadium holds 60,000 and was built in 2001 for the 2001 Mediterranean Games and is considered to be one of the best stadiums in Africa. The stadium was built for the 2001 Mediterranean Games, the 60,000-seat covered area covers 13,000 m2 and consists of a central area, 3 adjoining grounds, 2 warm-up rooms, 2 paintings and an official stand of 7,000 seats. The press gallery is equipped with 300 desks.

== Road to the final ==
Note: In all results below, the score of the finalist is given first (H: home; A: away).

(Egypt) Al Ahly				Round	(Tunisia) Espérance de Tunis			
Opponent	Agg.	1st leg	2nd leg	Qualifying rounds	Opponent	Agg.	1st leg	2nd leg
Bye				Preliminary round	(Mauritania) ASAC Concorde	6–1	1–1 (A)	5–0 (H)
(Gabon) CF Mounana	7–1	4–0 (H)	3–1 (A)	First round	(Kenya) Gor Mahia	1–0	0–0 (A)	1–0 (H)
Opponent	Result			Group stage	Opponent	Result		
(Tunisia) Espérance de Tunis	0–0 (H)			Matchday 1	(Egypt) Al Ahly	0–0 (A)		
(Uganda) KCCA	0–2 (A)			Matchday 2	(Botswana) Township Rollers	4–1 (H)		
(Botswana) Township Rollers	3–0 (H)			Matchday 3	(Uganda) KCCA	3–2 (H)		
(Botswana) Township Rollers	1–0 (A)			Matchday 4	(Uganda) KCCA	1–0 (A)		
(Tunisia) Espérance de Tunis	1–0 (A)			Matchday 5	(Egypt) Al Ahly	0–1 (H)		
(Uganda) KCCA	4–3 (H)			Matchday 6	(Botswana) Township Rollers	0–0 (A)		
**Group A winner**: Pos / Team / Pld / Pts; **1** / (Egypt) Al Ahly / **6** / **13**; 2 / (Tunisia) Espérance de Tunis / 6 / **11**; 3 / (Uganda) KCCA / 6 / **6**; 4 / (Botswana) Township Rollers / 6 / **4**; Source: CAF				Final standings	**Group A runner-up**: Pos / Team / Pld / Pts; 1 / (Egypt) Al Ahly / 6 / **13**; **2** / (Tunisia) Espérance de Tunis / **6** / **11**; 3 / (Uganda) KCCA / 6 / **6**; 4 / (Botswana) Township Rollers / 6 / **4**; Source: CAF			
Opponent	Agg.	1st leg	2nd leg	Knockout stage	Opponent	Agg.	1st leg	2nd leg
(Guinea) Horoya	4–0	0–0 (A)	4–0 (H)	Quarter-finals	(Tunisia) Étoile du Sahel	3–1	2–1 (H)	1–0 (A)
(Algeria) ES Sétif	3–2	2–0 (H)	1–2 (A)	Semi-finals	(Angola) 1º de Agosto	4–3	0–1 (A)	4–2 (H)

== Format ==
The final was played on a home-and-away two-legged basis, with the order of legs determined by the knockout stage draw, which was held on 3 September 2018, 20:00 EET (UTC+2), at the CAF headquarters in Cairo, Egypt.

If the aggregate score was tied after the second leg, the away goals rule would be applied, and if still tied, extra time would not be played, and the penalty shoot-out would be used to determine the winner.

== Matches ==
=== First leg ===
2 November 2018
21:00 UTC+2

Al Ahly (Egypt)	3–1	(Tunisia) Espérance de Tunis
Soliman 34' (pen.), 77' (pen.); El Solia 58'	Report	Belaïli 64' (pen.)

Borg El Arab Stadium, Alexandria
Attendance: 60,000
Referee: Mehdi Abid Charef (Algeria)

**Al-Ahly**	**Espérance de Tunis**

GK	16	(Egypt) Mohamed El Shenawy
RB	24	(Egypt) Ahmed Fathy		(substituted off) 22'
CB	20	(Egypt) Saad Samir	(yellow card) 49'
CB	3	(Mali) Salif Coulibaly
LB	12	(Egypt) Ayman Ashraf
RM	17	(Egypt) Ahmed Hamoudi		(substituted off) 67'
CM	25	(Egypt) Hossam Ashour (c)
CM	14	(Egypt) Amr El Solia
LM	5	(Egypt) Islam Mohareb
AM	11	(Egypt) Walid Soliman
CF	9	(Morocco) Walid Azaro
Substitutes:
GK	1	(Egypt) Sherif Ekramy
DF	6	(Egypt) Sabri Raheel
DF	30	(Egypt) Mohamed Hany	(yellow card) 87'	(substituted on) 22'
MF	2	(Egypt) Karim Walid
MF	27	(Egypt) Mohamed Gaber		(substituted on) 67'
FW	18	(Egypt) Marwan Mohsen
FW	29	(Egypt) Salah Mohsen
Manager:
(France) Patrice Carteron

GK	1	(Tunisia) Moez Ben Cherifia
RB	22	(Tunisia) Sameh Derbali	(yellow card) 81'
CB	5	(Tunisia) Chamseddine Dhaouadi	(yellow card) 18'
CB	12	(Tunisia) Khalil Chemmam (c)
LB	26	(Tunisia) Houcine Rabii
CM	15	(Ivory Coast) Fousseny Coulibaly
CM	30	(Cameroon) Franck Kom	(yellow card) 83'
CM	25	(Tunisia) Ghailene Chaalali
RW	8	(Tunisia) Anice Badri
CF	29	(Tunisia) Taha Yassine Khenissi		(substituted off) 80'
LW	11	(Algeria) Youcef Belaïli
Substitutes:
GK	19	(Tunisia) Rami Jridi
DF	2	(Tunisia) Ali Machani
DF	24	(Tunisia) Iheb Mbarki
DF	27	(Tunisia) Mohamed Ali Yacoubi
MF	18	(Tunisia) Saad Bguir
MF	28	(Tunisia) Mohamed Amine Meskini
FW	9	(Tunisia) Bilel Mejri		(substituted on) 80'
Manager:
(Tunisia) Moïne Chaâbani

Assistant referees:
Abdelhak Etchiali (Algeria)
Jean Claude Birumushahu (Burundi)
Fourth official:
Eric Otogo-Castane (Gabon)
Video assistant referee:
Bakary Gassama (Gambia)
Assistant video assistant referees:
El Hadji Samba (Senegal)
Djibril Camara (Senegal)

**Match rules**

- 90 minutes.
- Seven named substitutes, of which up to three may be used.

==== Statistics ====
First half
Statistic	Al-Ahly	Espérance de Tunis
Goals scored	1	0
Total shots	4	6
Shots on target	2	2
Passes	168	118
Ball possession	59%	41%

Second half
Statistic	Al-Ahly	Espérance de Tunis
Goals scored	2	1
Total shots	5	5
Shots on target	2	1
Passes	80	112
Ball possession	42%	58%

Overall
Statistic	Al-Ahly	Espérance de Tunis
Goals scored	3	1
Total shots	9	11
Shots on target	5	5
Passes	248	230
Ball possession	52%	48%

=== Second leg ===
9 November 2018
20:00 UTC+1

Espérance de Tunis (Tunisia)	3–0	(Egypt) Al Ahly
Bguir 45+1', 54'; Badri 86'	Report

Stade Olympique de Radès, Tunis
Attendance: 60,000
Referee: Bamlak Tessema Weyesa (Ethiopia)

**Espérance de Tunis**	**Al-Ahly**

GK	1	(Tunisia) Moez Ben Cherifia	(yellow card) 89'
RB	22	(Tunisia) Sameh Derbali
CB	27	(Tunisia) Mohamed Ali Yacoubi
CB	12	(Tunisia) Khalil Chemmam (c)
LB	20	(Tunisia) Ayman Ben Mohamed
CM	15	(Ivory Coast) Fousseny Coulibaly	(yellow card) 25'
CM	25	(Tunisia) Ghailene Chaalali
RW	8	(Tunisia) Anice Badri
AM	18	(Tunisia) Saad Bguir		(substituted off) 62'
LW	11	(Algeria) Youcef Belaïli		(substituted off) 80'
CF	29	(Tunisia) Taha Yassine Khenissi		(substituted off) 69'
Substitutes:
GK	19	(Tunisia) Rami Jridi
DF	2	(Tunisia) Ali Machani
DF	24	(Tunisia) Iheb Mbarki
DF	26	(Tunisia) Houcine Rabii		(substituted on) 62'
MF	28	(Tunisia) Mohamed Amine Meskini		(substituted on) 80'
FW	9	(Tunisia) Bilel Mejri	(yellow card) 90+2'	(substituted on) 69'
FW	14	(Tunisia) Haythem Jouini
Manager:
(Tunisia) Moïne Chaâbani

GK	16	(Egypt) Mohamed El Shenawy
RB	30	(Egypt) Mohamed Hany		(substituted off) 62'
CB	20	(Egypt) Saad Samir
CB	3	(Mali) Salif Coulibaly
LB	12	(Egypt) Ayman Ashraf
CM	25	(Egypt) Hossam Ashour (c)
CM	14	(Egypt) Amr El Solia		(substituted off) 75'
RW	11	(Egypt) Walid Soliman	(yellow card) 25'
AM	27	(Egypt) Mohamed Gaber		(substituted off) 62'
LW	5	(Egypt) Islam Mohareb
CF	18	(Egypt) Marwan Mohsen
Substitutes:
GK	1	(Egypt) Sherif Ekramy
DF	6	(Egypt) Sabri Raheel
MF	2	(Egypt) Karim Walid		(substituted on) 62'
MF	10	(Egypt) Nasser Maher
MF	17	(Egypt) Ahmed Hamoudi		(substituted on) 75'
MF	22	(Egypt) Akram Tawfik
FW	29	(Egypt) Salah Mohsen		(substituted on) 62'
Manager:
(France) Patrice Carteron

Assistant referees:
Zakhele Thusi Siwela (South Africa)
Waleed Ahmed Ali (Sudan)
Fourth official:
Eric Otogo-Castane (Gabon)
Video assistant referee:
Bakary Gassama (Gambia)
Assistant video assistant referees:
El Hadji Samba (Senegal)
Djibril Camara (Senegal)

**Match rules**

- 90 minutes.
- Penalty shoot-out if tied on aggregate and away goals.
- Seven named substitutes, of which up to three may be used.

==== Statistics ====
First half
Statistic	Espérance de Tunis	Al-Ahly
Goals scored	1	0
Total shots	8	0
Shots on target	2	0
Passes	265	110
Ball possession	70%	30%

Second half
Statistic	Espérance de Tunis	Al-Ahly
Goals scored	2	0
Total shots	5	1
Shots on target	3	0
Passes	182	175
Ball possession	50%	50%

Overall
Statistic	Espérance de Tunis	Al-Ahly
Goals scored	3	0
Total shots	13	1
Shots on target	5	0
Passes	447	285
Ball possession	60%	40%

== See also ==
- 2018 CAF Confederation Cup Final
- 2019 CAF Super Cup
