= 2018 CAF Champions League qualifying rounds =

- Dates: 10 February – 18 March 2018

The 2018 CAF Champions League qualifying rounds were played from 10 February to 18 March 2018. A total of 59 teams competed in the qualifying rounds to decide the 16 places in the group stage of the 2018 CAF Champions League.

== Draw ==
The draw for the preliminary round and first round was held on 13 December 2017 at the CAF headquarters in Cairo, Egypt.

The entry round of the 59 teams entered into the draw was determined by their performances in the CAF competitions for the previous five seasons (CAF 5-year ranking points shown in parentheses).

Entry round	First round (5 teams)	Preliminary round (54 teams)
Teams	(Democratic Republic of the Congo) TP Mazembe (75 pts); (Egypt) Al Ahly (58 pts); (Tunisia) Étoile du Sahel (49 pts); (Morocco) Wydad AC (46 pts); (South Africa) Mamelodi Sundowns (39 pts)	(Zambia) ZESCO United (26 pts); (Tunisia) Espérance de Tunis (24.5 pts); (Sudan) Al-Merrikh (22 pts); (Sudan) Al-Hilal (21 pts); (Algeria) ES Sétif (18.5 pts); (Democratic Republic of the Congo) AS Vita Club (15 pts); (Ethiopia) Saint George (10.5 pts); (Algeria) MC Alger (10 pts); (Zambia) Zanaco (10 pts); (Republic of the Congo) AC Léopards (10 pts); (Mali) Stade Malien (6 pts) (Note: The teams from Mali were listed as Mali A (Stade Malien) and Mali B (AS Real Bamako) at the time of the qualifying round draw.); (Ivory Coast) ASEC Mimosas (5 pts); (Guinea) Horoya (5 pts); (Eswatini) Mbabane Swallows (5 pts); (Uganda) KCCA (5 pts); (Gabon) CF Mounana (2.5 pts); (Mali) AS Real Bamako (2 pts); (Tanzania) Young Africans (2 pts); (Egypt) Misr Lel-Makkasa; (South Africa) Bidvest Wits; (Morocco) Difaâ El Jadidi; (Ivory Coast) Williamsville AC; (Republic of the Congo) AS Otôho; (Nigeria) Plateau United; (Nigeria) MFM; (Cameroon) Eding Sport; (Libya) Al-Tahaddy; (Ghana) Aduana Stars; (Angola) 1º de Agosto; (Benin) Buffles du Borgou (Note: The identity of the team from Benin was not known at the time of the qualifying round draw.); (Botswana) Township Rollers; (Burkina Faso) Rail Club du Kadiogo; (Burundi) LLB Académic FC; (Central African Republic) Olympic Real de Bangui; (Comoros) Ngaya Club; (Equatorial Guinea) Leones Vegetarianos; (The Gambia) Armed Forces; (Guinea-Bissau) Sport Bissau e Benfica; (Kenya) Gor Mahia; (Lesotho) Bantu; (Liberia) LISCR; (Madagascar) CNaPS Sport; (Malawi) Mighty Wanderers; (Mauritania) ASAC Concorde; (Mauritius) Pamplemousses; (Mozambique) UD Songo; (Niger) AS FAN; (Rwanda) Rayon Sports; (Senegal) Génération Foot; (Seychelles) Saint Louis Suns United; (South Sudan) Al-Salam Wau; AS Togo-Port; (Zanzibar) JKU; (Zimbabwe) FC Platinum

== Format ==
In the qualifying rounds, each tie was played on a home-and-away two-legged basis. If the aggregate score was tied after the second leg, the away goals rule would be applied, and if still tied, extra time would not be played, and the penalty shoot-out would be used to determine the winner (Regulations III. 13 & 14).

== Schedule ==
The schedule of each round was as follows (matches scheduled in midweek in italics).

Round	First leg	Second leg
Preliminary round	9–11 February 2018	20–21 February 2018
First round	6–7 March 2018	16–18 March 2018

== Bracket ==
The bracket of the draw was announced by the CAF on 13 December 2017. The 16 winners of the first round advanced to the group stage, while the 16 losers of the first round entered the Confederation Cup play-off round.

Preliminary round
1	(Ethiopia) Saint George	—	—	w/o
4	(South Sudan) Al-Salam Wau	—	—
3	(Madagascar) CNaPS Sport	2	0	2
2	(Uganda) KCCA	1	1	2 (a)

First round
(Ethiopia) Saint George	0	0	0
(Uganda) KCCA	0	1	1

Preliminary round
1	(Zambia) Zanaco	3	3	6
4	(The Gambia) Armed Forces	0	1	1
3	(Lesotho) Bantu	2	3	5
2	(Eswatini) Mbabane Swallows	4	1	5 (a)

First round
(Zambia) Zanaco	1	0	1
(Eswatini) Mbabane Swallows	2	1	3

Preliminary round
1	(Morocco) Wydad AC	Bye
4
3	(Mali) Stade Malien	1	0	1
2	(Ivory Coast) Williamsville AC	1	1	2

First round
(Morocco) Wydad AC	7	0	7
(Ivory Coast) Williamsville AC	2	2	4

Preliminary round
1	(Libya) Al-Tahaddy	1	0	1
4	(Ghana) Aduana Stars	0	2	2
3	(Algeria) ES Sétif	6	0	6
2	(Central African Republic) Olympic Real de Bangui	0	0	0

First round
(Ghana) Aduana Stars	1	0	1
(Algeria) ES Sétif	0	4	4

Preliminary round
1	(Egypt) Al-Ahly	Bye
4
3	(Burkina Faso) Rail Club du Kadiogo	1	0	1
2	(Gabon) CF Mounana	0	2	2

First round
(Egypt) Al-Ahly	4	3	7
(Gabon) CF Mounana	0	1	1

Preliminary round
1	(Mali) AS Real Bamako	1	0	1
4	(Nigeria) MFM	1	1	2
3	(Republic of the Congo) AS Otôho	2	0	2
2	(Algeria) MC Alger	0	9	9

First round
(Nigeria) MFM	2	0	2
(Algeria) MC Alger	1	6	7

Preliminary round
1	(Niger) AS FAN	1	0	1
4	(Guinea) Horoya	3	0	3
3	(Senegal) Génération Foot	2	0	2
2	(Egypt) Misr Lel-Makkasa	0	0	0

First round
(Guinea) Horoya	2	2	4
(Senegal) Génération Foot	1	0	1

Preliminary round
1	(Tanzania) Young Africans	1	1	2
4	(Seychelles) Saint Louis Suns United	0	1	1
3	(Botswana) Township Rollers	3	1	4
2	(Sudan) Al-Merrikh	0	2	2

First round
(Tanzania) Young Africans	1	0	1
(Botswana) Township Rollers	2	0	2

Preliminary round
1	(Kenya) Gor Mahia	2	1	3
4	(Equatorial Guinea) Leones Vegetarianos	0	1	1
3	(Mauritania) ASAC Concorde	1	0	1
2	(Tunisia) Espérance de Tunis	1	5	6

First round
(Kenya) Gor Mahia	0	0	0
(Tunisia) Espérance de Tunis	0	1	1

Preliminary round
1	(Tunisia) Étoile du Sahel	Bye
4
3	(Nigeria) Plateau United	3	1	4
2	(Cameroon) Eding Sport	0	0	0

First round
(Tunisia) Étoile du Sahel	4	0	4
(Nigeria) Plateau United	2	1	3

Preliminary round
1	(Republic of the Congo) AC Léopards	2	1	3 (3 p)
4	AS Togo-Port	1	2	3 (4 p)
3	(Liberia) LISCR	1	0	1
2	(Sudan) Al-Hilal	0	3	3

First round
AS Togo-Port	2	1	3 (a)
(Sudan) Al-Hilal	0	3	3

Preliminary round
1	(Zanzibar) JKU	0	0	0
4	(Zambia) ZESCO United	0	7	7
3	(Benin) Buffles du Borgou	1	2	3
2	(Ivory Coast) ASEC Mimosas	1	3	4

First round
(Zambia) ZESCO United	0	2	2 (a)
(Ivory Coast) ASEC Mimosas	1	1	2

Preliminary round
1	(Democratic Republic of the Congo) TP Mazembe	Bye
4
3	(Comoros) Ngaya Club	1	0	1
2	(Mozambique) UD Songo	1	2	3

First round
(Democratic Republic of the Congo) TP Mazembe	4	0	4
(Mozambique) UD Songo	0	3	3

Preliminary round
1	(Morocco) Difaâ El Jadidi	10	0	10
4	(Guinea-Bissau) Sport Bissau e Benfica	0	0	0
3	(Democratic Republic of the Congo) AS Vita Club	4	2	6
2	(Malawi) Mighty Wanderers	0	1	1

First round
(Morocco) Difaâ El Jadidi	1	2	3
(Democratic Republic of the Congo) AS Vita Club	0	2	2

Preliminary round
1	(Angola) 1º de Agosto	3	2	5
4	(Zimbabwe) FC Platinum	0	1	1
3	(South Africa) Bidvest Wits	2	0	2
2	(Mauritius) Pamplemousses	0	1	1

First round
(Angola) 1º de Agosto	1	0	1 (3 p)
(South Africa) Bidvest Wits	0	1	1 (2 p)

Preliminary round
1	(Rwanda) Rayon Sports	1	1	2
4	(Burundi) LLB Académic FC	1	0	1
3	(South Africa) Mamelodi Sundowns	Bye
2

First round
(Rwanda) Rayon Sports	0	0	0
(South Africa) Mamelodi Sundowns	0	2	2

== Preliminary round ==
The preliminary round included the 54 teams that did not receive byes to the first round.

Team 1	Agg.	Team 2	1st leg	2nd leg
Saint George (Ethiopia)	w/o (Note: Saint George won on walkover after Al-Salam Wau failed to arrive for the first leg.)	(South Sudan) Al-Salam Wau	—	—
CNaPS Sport (Madagascar)	2–2 (a)	(Uganda) KCCA	2–1	0–1
Zanaco (Zambia)	6–1	(The Gambia) Armed Forces	3–0	3–1
Bantu (Lesotho)	5–5 (a)	(Eswatini) Mbabane Swallows	2–4	3–1
Stade Malien (Mali)	1–2	(Ivory Coast) Williamsville AC	1–1	0–1
Al-Tahaddy (Libya)	1–2	(Ghana) Aduana Stars	1–0	0–2
ES Sétif (Algeria)	6–0	(Central African Republic) Olympic Real de Bangui	6–0	0–0
Rail Club du Kadiogo (Burkina Faso)	1–2	(Gabon) CF Mounana	1–0	0–2
AS Real Bamako (Mali)	1–2	(Nigeria) MFM	1–1	0–1
AS Otôho (Republic of the Congo)	2–9	(Algeria) MC Alger	2–0	0–9
AS FAN (Niger)	1–3	(Guinea) Horoya	1–3	0–0
Génération Foot (Senegal)	2–0	(Egypt) Misr Lel-Makkasa	2–0	0–0
Young Africans (Tanzania)	2–1	(Seychelles) Saint Louis Suns United	1–0	1–1
Township Rollers (Botswana)	4–2	(Sudan) Al-Merrikh	3–0	1–2
Gor Mahia (Kenya)	3–1	(Equatorial Guinea) Leones Vegetarianos	2–0	1–1
ASAC Concorde (Mauritania)	1–6	(Tunisia) Espérance de Tunis	1–1	0–5
Plateau United (Nigeria)	4–0	(Cameroon) Eding Sport	3–0	1–0
AC Léopards (Republic of the Congo)	3–3 (3–4 p)	AS Togo-Port	2–1	1–2
LISCR (Liberia)	1–3	(Sudan) Al-Hilal	1–0	0–3
JKU (Zanzibar)	0–7	(Zambia) ZESCO United	0–0	0–7
Buffles du Borgou (Benin)	3–4	(Ivory Coast) ASEC Mimosas	1–1	2–3
Ngaya Club (Comoros)	1–3	(Mozambique) UD Songo	1–1	0–2
Difaâ El Jadidi (Morocco)	10–0	(Guinea-Bissau) Sport Bissau e Benfica	10–0	0–0
AS Vita Club (Democratic Republic of the Congo)	6–1	(Malawi) Mighty Wanderers	4–0	2–1
1º de Agosto (Angola)	5–1	(Zimbabwe) FC Platinum	3–0	2–1
Bidvest Wits (South Africa)	2–1	(Mauritius) Pamplemousses	2–0	0–1
Rayon Sports (Rwanda)	2–1	(Burundi) LLB Académic FC	1–1	1–0

Notes:

11 February 2018
16:00 UTC+3

Saint George (Ethiopia)	Cancelled	(South Sudan) Al-Salam Wau
	Report

Addis Ababa Stadium, Addis Ababa
Referee: Georges Gatogato (Burundi)
20 February 2018
16:00 UTC+3

Al-Salam Wau (South Sudan)	Cancelled	(Ethiopia) Saint George
	Report

Juba Stadium, Juba
Referee: Ahmed Mahrous Mahmoud Ahmed Hassan (Egypt)

Saint George won on walkover after Al-Salam Wau failed to arrive for the first leg.

10 February 2018
14:30 UTC+3

CNaPS Sport (Madagascar)	2–1	(Uganda) KCCA
Ratolojanahary 60' (pen.); Rafaralahy 90+3'	Report	Nsibambi 53'

Vontovorona Stadium, Antananarivo
Referee: Ahmad Imtehaz Heeralall (Mauritius)
21 February 2018
16:00 UTC+3

KCCA (Uganda)	1–0	(Madagascar) CNaPS Sport
Mucureezi 64'	Report

Phillip Omondi Stadium, Kampala
Referee: Hassan Mohamed Hagi (Somalia)

2–2 on aggregate. KCCA won on away goals.

10 February 2018
15:00 UTC+2

Zanaco (Zambia)	3–0	(The Gambia) Armed Forces
Tembo 33'; Phiri 34', 90'	Report

Nkoloma Stadium, Lusaka
Referee: Patrick Ngoleka (Malawi)
24 February 2018
16:30 UTC+0

Armed Forces (The Gambia)	1–3	(Zambia) Zanaco
Sanneh 40'	Report	Mbewe 16'; Phiri 83'; Chilufya 88'

Independence Stadium, Bakau
Referee: Fabricio Duarte (Cape Verde)

Zanaco won 6–1 on aggregate.

11 February 2018
16:00 UTC+2

Bantu (Lesotho)	2–4	(Eswatini) Mbabane Swallows
Motseare 13'; Kalake 33' (pen.)	Report	Badenhorst 12'; Tsabedze 16' (pen.), 67'; Nhleko 58'

Setsoto Stadium, Maseru
Referee: Tirelo Mositwane (Botswana)
21 February 2018
16:00 UTC+2

Mbabane Swallows (Eswatini)	1–3	(Lesotho) Bantu
Badenhorst 6'	Report	Lebata 5'; Marabe 84'; Kalake 89'

Somhlolo National Stadium, Lobamba
Referee: Jackson Pavaza (Namibia)

5–5 on aggregate. Mbabane Swallows won on away goals.

10 February 2018
17:00 UTC+0

Stade Malien (Mali)	1–1	(Ivory Coast) Williamsville AC
Samaké 11' (pen.)	Report	Karidioula 90'

Stade Modibo Kéïta, Bamako
Referee: Jean Ouattara (Burkina Faso)
20 February 2018
16:00 UTC+0

Williamsville AC (Ivory Coast)	1–0	(Mali) Stade Malien
Zan Bi 90'	Report

Stade Robert Champroux, Abidjan
Referee: Adissa Abdul Raphiou Ligali (Benin)

Williamsville AC won 2–1 on aggregate.

11 February 2018
17:00 UTC+2

Al-Tahaddy (Libya)	1–0	(Ghana) Aduana Stars
Salem 34'	Report

Petro Sport Stadium, Cairo (Egypt) (Note: Teams from Libya are not allowed to host their home matches in their country due to security concerns.)
Referee: Samir Guezzaz (Morocco)
21 February 2018
15:00 UTC+0

Aduana Stars (Ghana)	2–0	(Libya) Al-Tahaddy
Opoku 53'; Sasraku 74'	Report

Agyeman Badu Stadium, Dormaa Ahenkro
Referee: Messie Nkounkou (Congo)

Aduana Stars won 2–1 on aggregate.

11 February 2018
18:00 UTC+1

ES Sétif (Algeria)	6–0	(Central African Republic) Olympic Real de Bangui
Haddouche 13' (pen.), 58', 76'; Djahnit 60', 89'; Rebiaï 79'	Report

Stade 8 Mai 1945, Sétif
Attendance: 0 (closed doors)
Referee: Daouda Guèye (Senegal)
20 February 2018
15:00 UTC+1

Olympic Real de Bangui (Central African Republic)	0–0	(Algeria) ES Sétif
	Report

Barthélemy Boganda Stadium, Bangui
Referee: David Ndong Esono Mokuy (Equatorial Guinea)

ES Sétif won 6–0 on aggregate.

10 February 2018
16:00 UTC+0

Rail Club du Kadiogo (Burkina Faso)	1–0	(Gabon) CF Mounana
Sawadogo 24' (pen.)	Report

Stade du 4 Août, Ouagadougou
Referee: Cecil Fleischer (Ghana)
21 February 2018
15:30 UTC+1

CF Mounana (Gabon)	2–0	(Burkina Faso) Rail Club du Kadiogo
Nono 29'; Atchabao 55'	Report

Stade d'Angondjé, Libreville
Referee: Issa Abdelhadi (Chad)

CF Mounana won 2–1 on aggregate.

11 February 2018
16:30 UTC+0

AS Real Bamako (Mali)	1–1	(Nigeria) MFM
Camara 18'	Report	Akinyemi 15'

Stade Modibo Kéïta, Bamako
Referee: Babacar Sarr (Mauritania)
21 February 2018
16:00 UTC+1

MFM (Nigeria)	1–0	(Mali) AS Real Bamako
Akuneto 80'	Report

Agege Stadium, Lagos
Referee: Kokou Ognankotan Ntale (Togo)

MFM won 2–1 on aggregate.

11 February 2018
15:30 UTC+1

AS Otôho (Republic of the Congo)	2–0	(Algeria) MC Alger
Cissé 57'; Obassi 74'	Report

Stade Omnisport Marien Ngouabi d'Owando, Owando
Referee: Blaise Yuven Ngwa (Cameroon)
21 February 2018
19:00 UTC+1

MC Alger (Algeria)	9–0	(Republic of the Congo) AS Otôho
Derrardja 6' (pen.); Nekkache 24', 63', 67', 81'; Souibaâh 34'; Amada 46'; Hachoud 71'; Balegh 77'	Report

Stade du 5 Juillet 1962, Algiers
Referee: Haythem Guirat (Tunisia)

MC Alger won 9–2 on aggregate.

10 February 2018
16:15 UTC+1

AS FAN (Niger)	1–3	(Guinea) Horoya
Sosah 31'	Report	Mandela 15'; Ouédraogo 17'; Sankhon 23'

Stade Général-Seyni-Kountché, Niamey
Referee: Bienvenu Sinko (Ivory Coast)
21 February 2018
17:00 UTC+0

Horoya (Guinea)	0–0	(Niger) AS FAN
	Report

Stade du 28 Septembre, Conakry
Referee: Raymond Coker (Sierra Leone)

Horoya won 3–1 on aggregate.

10 February 2018
17:00 UTC+0

Génération Foot (Senegal)	2–0	(Egypt) Misr Lel-Makkasa
Sabaly 54'; Ndiaye 75'	Report

Stade Léopold Sédar Senghor, Dakar
Referee: Boubou Traoré (Mali)
21 February 2018
19:00 UTC+2

Misr Lel-Makkasa (Egypt)	0–0	(Senegal) Génération Foot
	Report

Cairo International Stadium, Cairo
Attendance: 10,000
Referee: Esam Al Jahani (Libya)

Génération Foot won 2–0 on aggregate.

10 February 2018
16:00 UTC+3

Young Africans (Tanzania)	1–0	(Seychelles) Saint Louis Suns United
Mahadhi 67'	Report

National Stadium, Dar es Salaam
Referee: Belay Tadesse (Ethiopia)
21 February 2018
17:30 UTC+4

Saint Louis Suns United (Seychelles)	1–1	(Tanzania) Young Africans
Esther 90+3'	Report	Migomba 45'

Stade Linité, Victoria
Referee: Andofetra Rakotojaona (Madagascar)

Young Africans won 2–1 on aggregate.

10 February 2018
15:45 UTC+2

Township Rollers (Botswana)	3–0	(Sudan) Al-Merrikh
Gaolaolwe 27'; Moalosi 44'; Boy 71'	Report

Botswana National Stadium, Gaborone
Referee: Celso Alvação (Mozambique)
21 February 2018
19:30 UTC+2

Al-Merrikh (Sudan)	2–1	(Botswana) Township Rollers
Fofanah 19'; Al-Tash 84'	Report	Mogorosi 2'

Al-Merrikh Stadium, Omdurman
Referee: Bilal Abdallah Ismael (Djibouti)

Township Rollers won 4–2 on aggregate.

10 February 2018
15:00 UTC+3

Gor Mahia (Kenya)	2–0	(Equatorial Guinea) Leones Vegetarianos
Omondi 19'; Guikan 61'	Report

Kenyatta Stadium, Machakos
Referee: Mahmood Ali Mahmood Ismail (Sudan)
21 February 2018
17:00 UTC+1

Leones Vegetarianos (Equatorial Guinea)	1–1	(Kenya) Gor Mahia
Ayecaba 44'	Report	Asumu 74' (o.g.)

Estadio de Malabo, Malabo
Referee: Kabanga Yannick Malala (DR Congo)

Gor Mahia won 3–1 on aggregate.

10 February 2018
16:00 UTC+0

ASAC Concorde (Mauritania)	1–1	(Tunisia) Espérance de Tunis
El Id 25'	Report	Jouini 67'

Stade Cheikha Ould Boïdiya, Nouakchott
Referee: Baba Leno (Guinea)
21 February 2018
17:00 UTC+1

Espérance de Tunis (Tunisia)	5–0	(Mauritania) ASAC Concorde
Badri 6', 55' (pen.); Ben Sghaïer 73' (pen.); Erbeia 81'; Coulibaly 84'	Report

Stade Olympique de Radès, Tunis
Referee: Nabil Boukhalfa (Algeria)

Espérance de Tunis won 6–1 on aggregate.

11 February 2018
16:00 UTC+1

Plateau United (Nigeria)	3–0	(Cameroon) Eding Sport
Ogene 20'; Ngbede 84'; Obaje 90+1'	Report

New Jos Stadium, Jos
Referee: Maudo Jallow (Gambia)
21 February 2018
15:30 UTC+1

Eding Sport (Cameroon)	0–1	(Nigeria) Plateau United
	Report	Ayagwa 52'

Stade Ahmadou Ahidjo, Yaoundé
Referee: Jean Marc Ganamandji (Central African Republic)

Plateau United won 4–0 on aggregate.

10 February 2018
15:30 UTC+1

AC Léopards (Republic of the Congo)	2–1	AS Togo-Port
Masombo 50'; Gandzé 73'	Report	Sangare 69'

Stade de Madingou, Madingou
Referee: Gauthier Marc Mihindou Mbina (Gabon)
21 February 2018
15:00 UTC+0

AS Togo-Port	2–1	(Republic of the Congo) AC Léopards
Sewonou 1'; Bourahana 90'	Report	Kwedi 73'
Penalties
Gazozo (penalty scored); Novon (penalty scored); Djadja (penalty scored); Kloukpo (penalty missed); Ouro-Sama (penalty scored)	4–3	(penalty scored) Mampembe; (penalty scored) Kwedi; (penalty scored) Lakolo; (penalty missed) Gandzé; (penalty missed) Moubhio

Stade Municipal, Lomé
Referee: Abdullahi Shuaibu (Nigeria)

3–3 on aggregate. AS Togo-Port won 4–3 on penalties.

11 February 2018
16:00 UTC+0

LISCR (Liberia)	1–0	(Sudan) Al-Hilal
Sheriff 20'	Report

Antoinette Tubman Stadium, Monrovia
Referee: Gilberto dos Santos (Guinea-Bissau)
20 February 2018
19:30 UTC+2

Al-Hilal (Sudan)	3–0	(Liberia) LISCR
Bashir 2', 43'; Shiboub 65'	Report

Al-Hilal Stadium, Omdurman
Referee: Peter Waweru (Kenya)

Al-Hilal won 3–1 on aggregate.

10 February 2018
16:00 UTC+3

JKU (Zanzibar)	0–0	(Zambia) ZESCO United
	Report

Amaan Stadium, Zanzibar City
Referee: Jean Claude Ishimwe (Rwanda)
21 February 2018
15:00 UTC+2

ZESCO United (Zambia)	7–0	(Zanzibar) JKU
Adams 3', 42', 57', 60'; Kambole 36'; Kalengo 77'; Banda 88' (pen.)	Report

Levy Mwanawasa Stadium, Ndola
Referee: Thulani Sibandze (Swaziland)

ZESCO United won 7–0 on aggregate.

11 February 2018
16:00 UTC+1

Buffles du Borgou (Benin)	1–1	(Ivory Coast) ASEC Mimosas
Koukpo 63'	Report	Touré 66'

Stade de l'Amitié, Cotonou
Referee: Esterline Gonçalves Género (São Tomé and Príncipe)
21 February 2018
16:00 UTC+0

ASEC Mimosas (Ivory Coast)	3–2	(Benin) Buffles du Borgou
Agbégniadan 29'; Badie 51'; Touré 74'	Report	Bawa 49'; Agognon 66'

Stade Félix Houphouët-Boigny, Abidjan
Referee: Abdoulaye Rhissa Almoustapha (Niger)

ASEC Mimosas won 4–3 on aggregate.

11 February 2018
15:00 UTC+3

Ngaya Club (Comoros)	1–1	(Mozambique) UD Songo
Hadji 79'	Report	Pelembe 5'

Stade de Moroni, Moroni
Referee: Osiase Koto (Lesotho)
21 February 2018
15:00 UTC+2

UD Songo (Mozambique)	2–0	(Comoros) Ngaya Club
Mário 11'; Omar 89'	Report

Estádio do Ferroviário, Beira
Referee: Nomore Murambiwa Musundire (Zimbabwe)

UD Songo won 3–1 on aggregate.

10 February 2018
19:00 UTC+0

Difaâ El Jadidi (Morocco)	10–0	(Guinea-Bissau) Sport Bissau e Benfica
N'Diaye 4'; Ahaddad 24' (pen.), 27', 38', 43', 48'; Msuva 45', 73', 88'; El Magri 55'	Report

Stade El Abdi, El Jadida
Attendance: 13,000
Referee: Amin Mohamed Omar (Egypt)
21 February 2018
14:00 UTC+0

Sport Bissau e Benfica (Guinea-Bissau)	0–0	(Morocco) Difaâ El Jadidi
	Report

Estádio 24 de Setembro, Bissau
Referee: Jerry Yekeh (Liberia)

Difaâ El Jadidi won 10–0 on aggregate.

11 February 2018
15:30 UTC+1

AS Vita Club (Democratic Republic of the Congo)	4–0	(Malawi) Mighty Wanderers
Moloko 17', 87'; Batezadio 29'; Mundele 42'	Report

Stade des Martyrs, Kinshasa
Referee: Ring Nyier Akech Malong (South Sudan)
21 February 2018
14:30 UTC+2

Mighty Wanderers (Malawi)	1–2	(Democratic Republic of the Congo) AS Vita Club
Wadabwa 48'	Report	Mundele 20'; Boyombe 76'

Kamuzu Stadium, Blantyre
Referee: António Muachihuissa Caxala (Angola)

AS Vita Club won 6–1 on aggregate.

11 February 2018
16:00 UTC+1

1º de Agosto (Angola)	3–0	(Zimbabwe) FC Platinum
Bokamba 7'; Bitumba 52', 61'	Report

Estádio 11 de Novembro, Luanda
Referee: Audrick Nkole (Zambia)
21 February 2018
15:00 UTC+2

FC Platinum (Zimbabwe)	1–2	(Angola) 1º de Agosto
Chinyengetere 65'	Report	Mhango 54' (o.g.); Bitumba 90+3'

Mandava Stadium, Zvishavane
Referee: Christopher Harrison (South Africa)

1º de Agosto won 5–1 on aggregate.

10 February 2018
18:00 UTC+2

Bidvest Wits (South Africa)	2–0	(Mauritius) Pamplemousses
Kodisang 23'; Rodgers 37'	Report

Bidvest Stadium, Johannesburg
Referee: Nelson Fred (Seychelles)
21 February 2018
16:00 UTC+4

Pamplemousses (Mauritius)	1–0	(South Africa) Bidvest Wits
Perticots 9'	Report

Stade Anjalay, Belle Vue Maurel
Referee: Ali Adelaïd (Comoros)

Bidvest Wits won 2–1 on aggregate.

10 February 2018
15:30 UTC+2

Rayon Sports (Rwanda)	1–1	(Burundi) LLB Académic FC
Shabani 82'	Report	Bazunza 74'

Amahoro Stadium, Kigali
Referee: Alex Muhabi (Uganda)
21 February 2018
15:00 UTC+2

LLB Académic FC (Burundi)	0–1	(Rwanda) Rayon Sports
	Report	Shabani 27'

Prince Louis Rwagasore Stadium, Bujumbura
Referee: Mfaume Ali Nassoro (Tanzania)

Rayon Sports won 2–1 on aggregate.

== First round ==
The first round included 32 teams: the 27 winners of the preliminary round, and the 5 teams that received byes to this round.

Team 1	Agg.	Team 2	1st leg	2nd leg
Saint George (Ethiopia)	0–1	(Uganda) KCCA	0–0	0–1
Zanaco (Zambia)	1–3	(Eswatini) Mbabane Swallows	1–2	0–1
Wydad AC (Morocco)	7–4	(Ivory Coast) Williamsville AC	7–2	0–2
Aduana Stars (Ghana)	1–4	(Algeria) ES Sétif	1–0	0–4
Al-Ahly (Egypt)	7–1	(Gabon) CF Mounana	4–0	3–1
MFM (Nigeria)	2–7	(Algeria) MC Alger	2–1	0–6
Horoya (Guinea)	4–1	(Senegal) Génération Foot	2–1	2–0
Young Africans (Tanzania)	1–2	(Botswana) Township Rollers	1–2	0–0
Gor Mahia (Kenya)	0–1	(Tunisia) Espérance de Tunis	0–0	0–1
Étoile du Sahel (Tunisia)	4–3	(Nigeria) Plateau United	4–2	0–1
AS Togo-Port	3–3 (a)	(Sudan) Al-Hilal	2–0	1–3
ZESCO United (Zambia)	2–2 (a)	(Ivory Coast) ASEC Mimosas	0–1	2–1
TP Mazembe (Democratic Republic of the Congo)	4–3	(Mozambique) UD Songo	4–0	0–3
Difaâ El Jadidi (Morocco)	3–2	(Democratic Republic of the Congo) AS Vita Club	1–0	2–2
1º de Agosto (Angola)	1–1 (3–2 p)	(South Africa) Bidvest Wits	1–0	0–1
Rayon Sports (Rwanda)	0–2	(South Africa) Mamelodi Sundowns	0–0	0–2

7 March 2018
16:00 UTC+3

Saint George (Ethiopia)	0–0	(Uganda) KCCA
	Report

Addis Ababa Stadium, Addis Ababa
Referee: Jean Claude Ishimwe (Rwanda)
17 March 2018
16:00 UTC+3

KCCA (Uganda)	1–0	(Ethiopia) Saint George
Shaban 46'	Report

Phillip Omondi Stadium, Kampala
Referee: Andrew Otieno (Kenya)

KCCA won 1–0 on aggregate

7 March 2018
15:00 UTC+2

Zanaco (Zambia)	1–2	(Eswatini) Mbabane Swallows
Maisha 42'	Report	Badenhorst 55'; McCreesh 86'

Nkoloma Stadium, Lusaka
Referee: Norman Matemera (Zimbabwe)
17 March 2018
15:00 UTC+2

Mbabane Swallows (Eswatini)	1–0	(Zambia) Zanaco
Nhleko 24'	Report

Somhlolo National Stadium, Lobamba
Referee: Celso Alvação (Mozambique)

Mbabane Swallows won 3–1 on aggregate.

7 March 2018
18:00 UTC+0

Wydad AC (Morocco)	7–2	(Ivory Coast) Williamsville AC
Aoulad 6'; Tighazoui 16', 62'; Nahiri 52'; Haddad 74', 89', 90'	Report	J.-W. N'da 2'; J.-F. N'da 37'

Stade Mohammed V, Casablanca
Referee: Eric Otogo-Castane (Gabon)
17 March 2018
16:00 UTC+0

Williamsville AC (Ivory Coast)	2–0	(Morocco) Wydad AC
Kouassi 39' (pen.), 83' (pen.)	Report

Stade Robert Champroux, Abidjan
Referee: Daniel Laryea (Ghana)

Wydad AC won 7–4 on aggregate.

7 March 2018
15:00 UTC+0

Aduana Stars (Ghana)	1–0	(Algeria) ES Sétif
Adams 73' (pen.)	Report

Agyeman Badu Stadium, Dormaa Ahenkro
Referee: Denis Dembélé (Ivory Coast)
18 March 2018
19:00 UTC+1

ES Sétif (Algeria)	4–0	(Ghana) Aduana Stars
Benayad 27'; Ziti 43'; Bedrane 61'; Amokrane 89'	Report

Stade 8 Mai 1945, Sétif
Referee: Juste Ephrem Zio (Burkina Faso)

ES Sétif won 4–1 on aggregate.

6 March 2018
20:00 UTC+2

Al-Ahly (Egypt)	4–0	(Gabon) CF Mounana
M. Mohsen 14'; Azaro 21'; Said 65', 69' (pen.)	Report

Cairo International Stadium, Cairo
Attendance: 10,000
Referee: Boubou Traoré (Mali)
17 March 2018
15:30 UTC+1

CF Mounana (Gabon)	1–3	(Egypt) Al-Ahly
Massamba 44'	Report	Gaber 8'; Azaro 30'; Soliman 82'

Stade d'Angondjé, Libreville
Referee: Bamlak Tessema Weyesa (Ethiopia)

Al-Ahly won 7–1 on aggregate.

7 March 2018
16:00 UTC+1

MFM (Nigeria)	2–1	(Algeria) MC Alger
Akuneto 36' (pen.); Bashiru 83'	Report	Ammachi 55'

Agege Stadium, Lagos
Referee: Malang Diedhiou (Senegal)
17 March 2018
19:00 UTC+1

MC Alger (Algeria)	6–0	(Nigeria) MFM
Bendebka 2'; Derrardja 11'; Nekkache 20', 55'; Karaoui 30'; Amada 90'	Report

Stade du 5 Juillet 1962, Algiers
Referee: Youssef Essrayri (Tunisia)

MC Alger won 7–2 on aggregate.

6 March 2018
17:00 UTC+0

Horoya (Guinea)	2–1	(Senegal) Génération Foot
Ouédraogo 63'; A. P. Camara 89'	Report	Konté 75'

Stade du 28 Septembre, Conakry
Referee: Mehdi Abid Charef (Algeria)
17 March 2018
17:30 UTC+0

Génération Foot (Senegal)	0–2	(Guinea) Horoya
	Report	D. Camara 25' (pen.); Mensah 88'

Stade Léopold Sédar Senghor, Dakar
Referee: Jean-Jacques Ndala Ngambo (DR Congo)

Horoya won 4–1 on aggregate.

6 March 2018
16:30 UTC+3

Young Africans (Tanzania)	1–2	(Botswana) Township Rollers
Chirwa 30'	Report	Tshireletso 11'; Sikele 83'

National Stadium, Dar es Salaam
Referee: Pacifique Ndabihawenimana (Burundi)
17 March 2018
15:45 UTC+2

Township Rollers (Botswana)	0–0	(Tanzania) Young Africans
	Report

Botswana National Stadium, Gaborone
Attendance: 18,702
Referee: Rédouane Jiyed (Morocco)

Township Rollers won 2–1 on aggregate.

7 March 2018
15:00 UTC+3

Gor Mahia (Kenya)	0–0	(Tunisia) Espérance de Tunis
	Report

Kenyatta Stadium, Machakos
Referee: Gehad Grisha (Egypt)
18 March 2018
16:00 UTC+1

Espérance de Tunis (Tunisia)	1–0	(Kenya) Gor Mahia
Badri 21'	Report

Stade Olympique de Radès, Tunis
Referee: Joshua Bondo (Botswana)

Espérance de Tunis won 1–0 on aggregate.

6 March 2018
18:00 UTC+1

Étoile du Sahel (Tunisia)	4–2	(Nigeria) Plateau United
Marey 2'; Chermiti 3', 8'; Sfaxi 54'	Report	Ayagwa 70' (pen.); Omoleye 82'

Stade Olympique de Sousse, Sousse
Referee: Mustapha Ghorbal (Algeria)
18 March 2018
14:00 UTC+1

Plateau United (Nigeria)	1–0	(Tunisia) Étoile du Sahel
Omoleye 24'	Report

Sani Abacha Stadium, Kano
Referee: Hélder Martins de Carvalho (Angola)

Étoile du Sahel won 4–3 on aggregate.

7 March 2018
15:00 UTC+0

AS Togo-Port	2–0	(Sudan) Al-Hilal
Gazozo 43'; Sewonou 79'	Report

Stade Municipal, Lomé
Referee: Noureddine El Jaafari (Morocco)
18 March 2018
19:30 UTC+2

Al-Hilal (Sudan)	3–1	AS Togo-Port
Geovane 4'; Shaiboub 61'; Bashir 83'	Report	Hunlede 7'

Al-Hilal Stadium, Omdurman
Referee: Brian Miiro (Uganda)

3–3 on aggregate. AS Togo-Port won on away goals.

7 March 2018
15:00 UTC+2

ZESCO United (Zambia)	0–1	(Ivory Coast) ASEC Mimosas
	Report	Sakala 38' (o.g.)

Levy Mwanawasa Stadium, Ndola
Referee: Bernard Camille (Seychelles)
18 March 2018
16:00 UTC+0

ASEC Mimosas (Ivory Coast)	1–2	(Zambia) ZESCO United
Badie 9' (pen.)	Report	Kapumbu 30'; Kambole 65'

Stade Félix Houphouët-Boigny, Abidjan
Referee: Hamada Nampiandraza (Madagascar)

2–2 on aggregate. ZESCO United won on away goals.

7 March 2018
15:30 UTC+2

TP Mazembe (Democratic Republic of the Congo)	4–0	(Mozambique) UD Songo
Malango 37', 51' (pen.), 62'; Muleka 85' (pen.)	Report

Stade TP Mazembe, Lubumbashi
Referee: Bakary Gassama (Gambia)
17 March 2018
15:00 UTC+2

UD Songo (Mozambique)	3–0	(Democratic Republic of the Congo) TP Mazembe
Pelembe 1', 75'; Banda 49'	Report

Estádio do Ferroviário, Beira
Referee: Ahmad Imtehaz Heeralall (Mauritius)

TP Mazembe won 4–3 on aggregate.

7 March 2018
20:00 UTC+0

Difaâ El Jadidi (Morocco)	1–0	(Democratic Republic of the Congo) AS Vita Club
Msuva 9'	Report

Stade El Abdi, El Jadida
Referee: Raymond Coker (Sierra Leone)
18 March 2018
14:30 UTC+1

AS Vita Club (Democratic Republic of the Congo)	2–2	(Morocco) Difaâ El Jadidi
Mundele 20', 82'	Report	Ahaddad 77'; Nanah 90+4'

Stade des Martyrs, Kinshasa
Referee: Victor Gomes (South Africa)

Difaâ El Jadidi won 3–2 on aggregate.

7 March 2018
16:00 UTC+1

1º de Agosto (Angola)	1–0	(South Africa) Bidvest Wits
Geraldo 87'	Report

Estádio 11 de Novembro, Luanda
Referee: Antoine Effa (Cameroon)
17 March 2018
17:00 UTC+2

Bidvest Wits (South Africa)	1–0	(Angola) 1º de Agosto
Domingues 81'	Report
Penalties
Majoro (penalty missed); Domingues (penalty missed); Klate (penalty missed); Frosler (penalty scored); Claasen (penalty scored)	2–3	(penalty scored) Isaac; (penalty missed) Ibukun; (penalty missed) Natael; (penalty scored) Paizo; (penalty scored) Geraldo

Bidvest Stadium, Johannesburg
Referee: Hassan Mohamed Hagi (Somalia)

1–1 on aggregate. 1º de Agosto won 3–2 on penalties.

7 March 2018
18:00 UTC+2

Rayon Sports (Rwanda)	0–0	(South Africa) Mamelodi Sundowns
	Report

Amahoro Stadium, Kigali
Referee: Janny Sikazwe (Zambia)
18 March 2018
19:00 UTC+2

Mamelodi Sundowns (South Africa)	2–0	(Rwanda) Rayon Sports
Arendse 34'; Vilakazi 55'	Report

Loftus Versfeld Stadium, Pretoria
Referee: Jackson Pavaza (Namibia)

Mamelodi Sundowns won 2–0 on aggregate.
