= Champions League 2018 =

Champions League 2018 may refer to:

- 2018 AFC Champions League
- 2018 CAF Champions League
- 2017–18 UEFA Champions League
- 2018–19 UEFA Champions League
- 2018 CONCACAF Champions League
