= 2018 Champions League =

2018 Champions League may refer to:

== Football ==
- 2017–18 UEFA Champions League
- 2018–19 UEFA Champions League
- 2018 AFC Champions League
- 2018 CAF Champions League
- 2018 CONCACAF Champions League
