= 2018 CAF Champions League knockout stage =

Football tournament knockout stage

The 2018 CAF Champions League knockout stage was played from 14 September to 9 November 2018. A total of eight teams competed in the knockout stage to decide the champions of the 2018 CAF Champions League.

== Qualified teams ==
The winners and runners-up of each of the four groups in the group stage advanced to the quarter-finals.

Group	Winners	Runners-up
A	(Egypt) Al Ahly	(Tunisia) Espérance de Tunis
B	(Democratic Republic of the Congo) TP Mazembe	(Algeria) ES Sétif
C	(Morocco) Wydad AC	(Guinea) Horoya
D	(Tunisia) Étoile du Sahel	(Angola) 1º de Agosto

== Format ==
In the knockout stage, the eight teams played a single-elimination tournament. Each tie was played on a home-and-away two-legged basis. If the aggregate score was tied after the second leg, the away goals rule would be applied, and if still tied, extra time would not be played, and the penalty shoot-out would be used to determine the winner (Regulations III. 26 & 27).

== Schedule ==
The schedule of each round was as follows (matches scheduled in midweek in italics). Effective from the Champions League group stage, weekend matches were played on Fridays and Saturdays while midweek matches were played on Tuesdays, with some exceptions. Kick-off times were also fixed at 13:00 (Saturdays and Tuesdays only), 16:00 and 19:00 GMT.

Round	First leg	Second leg
Quarter-finals	14–15 September 2018	21–22 September 2018
Semi-finals	2 October 2018	23 October 2018
Final	2 November 2018	9 November 2018

== Bracket ==
The bracket of the knockout stage was determined as follows:

Round	Matchups
Quarter-finals	(Group winners host second leg, matchups decided by draw, teams from same group cannot play each other): QF1; QF2; QF3; QF4
Semi-finals	(Matchups and order of legs decided by draw, between winners QF1, QF2, QF3, QF4): SF1; SF2
Final	(Winners SF1 host first leg, Winners SF2 host second leg): Winner SF1 vs. Winner SF2

The bracket was decided after the draw for the knockout stage (quarter-finals and semi-finals), which was held on 3 September 2018, 20:00 EET (UTC+2), at the CAF headquarters in Cairo, Egypt.

Quarter-finals
(Guinea) Horoya	0	0	0
(Egypt) Al Ahly	0	4	4
(Algeria) ES Sétif	1	0	1
(Morocco) Wydad AC	0	0	0
(Angola) 1º de Agosto	0	1	1 (a)
(Democratic Republic of the Congo) TP Mazembe	0	1	1
(Tunisia) Espérance de Tunis	2	1	3
(Tunisia) Étoile du Sahel	1	0	1

Semi-finals
(Egypt) Al Ahly	2	1	3
(Algeria) ES Sétif	0	2	2
(Angola) 1º de Agosto	1	2	3
(Tunisia) Espérance de Tunis	0	4	4

Final
(Egypt) Al Ahly	3	0	3
(Tunisia) Espérance de Tunis	1	3	4

== Quarter-finals ==
In the quarter-finals, the winners of one group played the runners-up of another group (teams from same group could not play each other), with the group winners hosting the second leg, and the matchups decided by draw.

Team 1	Agg.	Team 2	1st leg	2nd leg
1º de Agosto (Angola)	1–1 (a)	(Democratic Republic of the Congo) TP Mazembe	0–0	1–1
Espérance de Tunis (Tunisia)	3–1	(Tunisia) Étoile du Sahel	2–1	1–0
ES Sétif (Algeria)	1–0	(Morocco) Wydad AC	1–0	0–0
Horoya (Guinea)	0–4	(Egypt) Al Ahly	0–0	0–4

15 September 2018
17:00 UTC+1

1º de Agosto (Angola)	0–0	(Democratic Republic of the Congo) TP Mazembe
	Report

Estádio 11 de Novembro, Luanda
Referee: Rédouane Jiyed (Morocco)
21 September 2018
15:00 UTC+2

TP Mazembe (Democratic Republic of the Congo)	1–1	(Angola) 1º de Agosto
Muleka 12'	Report	Bokamba 34'

Stade TP Mazembe, Lubumbashi
Attendance: 17,000
Referee: Mehdi Abid Charef (Algeria)

1–1 on aggregate. 1º de Agosto won on away goals.

15 September 2018
20:00 UTC+1

Espérance de Tunis (Tunisia)	2–1	(Tunisia) Étoile du Sahel
Dhaouadi 2'; Derbali 77'	Report	Jemal 28'

Stade Olympique de Radès, Tunis
Attendance: 30,000
Referee: Bamlak Tessema Weyesa (Ethiopia)
21 September 2018
17:00 UTC+1

Étoile du Sahel (Tunisia)	0–1	(Tunisia) Espérance de Tunis
	Report	Coulibaly 87'

Stade Olympique de Sousse, Sousse
Attendance: 25,000
Referee: Victor Gomes (South Africa)

Espérance de Tunis won 3–1 on aggregate.

14 September 2018
20:00 UTC+1

ES Sétif (Algeria)	1–0	(Morocco) Wydad AC
Diomande 16'	Report

Stade du 8-Mai-1945, Sétif
Attendance: 23,000
Referee: Eric Otogo-Castane (Gabon)
21 September 2018
20:00 UTC+1

Wydad AC (Morocco)	0–0	(Algeria) ES Sétif
	Report

Stade Mohammed V, Casablanca
Attendance: 43,000
Referee: Bernard Camille (Seychelles)

ES Sétif won 1–0 on aggregate.

14 September 2018
16:00 UTC+0

Horoya (Guinea)	0–0	(Egypt) Al-Ahly
	Report

Stade du 28 Septembre, Conakry
Attendance: 35,000
Referee: Youssef Essrayri (Tunisia)
22 September 2018
21:00 UTC+2

Al-Ahly (Egypt)	4–0	(Guinea) Horoya
Soliman 32'; Mohareb 53'; S. Mohsen 69'; Fathy 90+2'	Report

Al-Salam Stadium, Cairo
Attendance: 22,500
Referee: Bakary Gassama (Gambia)

Al-Ahly won 4–0 on aggregate.

== Semi-finals ==
In the semi-finals, the four quarter-final winners played in two ties, with the matchups and order of legs decided by draw.

Team 1	Agg.	Team 2	1st leg	2nd leg
Al-Ahly (Egypt)	3–2	(Algeria) ES Sétif	2–0	1–2
1º de Agosto (Angola)	3–4	(Tunisia) Espérance de Tunis	1–0	2–4

2 October 2018
21:00 UTC+2

Al-Ahly (Egypt)	2–0	(Algeria) ES Sétif
Soliman 23'; Mohareb 41'	Report

Al-Salam Stadium, Cairo
Referee: Bamlak Tessema Weyesa (Ethiopia)
23 October 2018
20:00 UTC+1

ES Sétif (Algeria)	2–1	(Egypt) Al-Ahly
Bakir 67'; Ghacha 72'	Report	Soliman 61'

Stade du 8-Mai-1945, Sétif
Attendance: 25,000
Referee: Victor Gomes (South Africa)

Al-Ahly won 3–2 on aggregate.

2 October 2018
17:00 UTC+1

1º de Agosto (Angola)	1–0	(Tunisia) Espérance de Tunis
Buá 82'	Report

Estádio 11 de Novembro, Luanda
Attendance: 25,000
Referee: Maguette N'Diaye (Senegal)
23 October 2018
17:00 UTC+1

Espérance de Tunis (Tunisia)	4–2	(Angola) 1º de Agosto
Belaïli 16' (pen.); Yacoubi 27'; Jouini 73'; Badri 85'	Report	Geraldo 8'; Bokamba 64'

Stade Olympique de Radès, Tunis
Attendance: 50,000
Referee: Janny Sikazwe (Zambia)

Espérance de Tunis won 4–3 on aggregate.

== Final ==
In the final, the two semi-final winners played each other, with the order of legs determined by the semi-final draw.

2 November 2018
21:00 UTC+2

Al Ahly (Egypt)	3–1	(Tunisia) Espérance de Tunis
Soliman 34' (pen.), 77' (pen.); El Solia 58'	Report	Belaïli 64' (pen.)

Borg El Arab Stadium, Alexandria
Attendance: 60,000
Referee: Mehdi Abid Charef (Algeria)
9 November 2018
20:00 UTC+1

Espérance de Tunis (Tunisia)	3–0	(Egypt) Al Ahly
Bguir 45+1', 54'; Badri 86'	Report

Stade Olympique de Radès, Tunis
Attendance: 60,000
Referee: Bamlak Tessema Weyesa (Ethiopia)

Espérance de Tunis won 4–3 on aggregate.
