= 2018 CAF Champions League group stage =

- Dates: 4 May – 28 August 2018

Tournament statistics
- Matches played: 48
- Goals scored: 102 (2.13 per match)

The 2018 CAF Champions League group stage was played from 4 May to 28 August 2018. A total of 16 teams competed in the group stage to decide the eight places in the knockout stage of the 2018 CAF Champions League.

== Draw ==
The draw for the group stage was held on 21 March 2018, 19:00 EET (UTC+2), at the Ritz Carlton in Cairo, Egypt. The 16 teams, all winners of the first round of qualifying, were drawn into four groups of four. The teams were seeded by their performances in the CAF competitions for the previous five seasons (CAF 5-year ranking points shown in parentheses). Each group contained one team from each of Pot 1, Pot 2, Pot 3, and Pot 4, and each team was drawn into one of the positions in their group.

Pot	Pot 1	Pot 2	Pot 3	Pot 4
Teams	(Democratic Republic of the Congo) TP Mazembe (75 pts); (Egypt) Al Ahly (58 pts); (Tunisia) Étoile du Sahel (49 pts); (Morocco) Wydad AC (46 pts)	(South Africa) Mamelodi Sundowns (39 pts); (Zambia) ZESCO United (26 pts); (Tunisia) Espérance de Tunis (24.5 pts); (Algeria) ES Sétif (18.5 pts)	(Algeria) MC Alger (10 pts); (Uganda) KCCA (5 pts); (Guinea) Horoya (5 pts); (Eswatini) Mbabane Swallows (5 pts)	(Angola) 1º de Agosto; (Botswana) Township Rollers; (Morocco) Difaâ El Jadidi; AS Togo-Port

== Format ==
In the group stage, each group was played on a home-and-away round-robin basis. The winners and runners-up of each group advanced to the quarter-finals of the knockout stage.

=== Tiebreakers ===
The teams were ranked according to points (3 points for a win, 1 point for a draw, 0 points for a loss). If tied on points, tiebreakers were applied in the following order (Regulations III. 20 & 21):

1. Points in head-to-head matches among tied teams;
2. Goal difference in head-to-head matches among tied teams;
3. Goals scored in head-to-head matches among tied teams;
4. Away goals scored in head-to-head matches among tied teams;
5. If more than two teams are tied, and after applying all head-to-head criteria above, a subset of teams are still tied, all head-to-head criteria above are reapplied exclusively to this subset of teams;
6. Goal difference in all group matches;
7. Goals scored in all group matches;
8. Away goals scored in all group matches;
9. Drawing of lots.

== Schedule ==
The schedule of each matchday was as follows (matches scheduled in midweek in italics). Effective from the Champions League group stage, weekend matches were played on Fridays and Saturdays while midweek matches were played on Tuesdays, with some exceptions. Kick-off times were also fixed at 13:00 (Saturdays and Tuesdays only), 16:00 and 19:00 GMT.

Matchday	Dates	Matches
Matchday 1	4–5 May 2018	Team 1 vs. Team 4, Team 2 vs. Team 3
Matchday 2	15 May 2018	Team 3 vs. Team 1, Team 4 vs. Team 2
Matchday 3	17 July 2018	Team 4 vs. Team 3, Team 1 vs. Team 2
Matchday 4	27–28 July 2018	Team 3 vs. Team 4, Team 2 vs. Team 1
Matchday 5	17–18 August 2018	Team 4 vs. Team 1, Team 3 vs. Team 2
Matchday 6	28 August 2018	Team 1 vs. Team 3, Team 2 vs. Team 4

== Groups ==
=== Group A ===
Pos	Team	Pld	W	D	L	GF	GA	GD	Pts	Qualification	AHL	EST	KCC	ROL
1	(Egypt) Al Ahly	6	4	1	1	9	5	+4	13	Quarter-finals	—	0–0	4–3	3–0
2	(Tunisia) Espérance de Tunis	6	3	2	1	8	4	+4	11	Quarter-finals	0–1	—	3–2	4–1
3	(Uganda) KCCA	6	2	0	4	8	9	−1	6		2–0	0–1	—	1–0
4	(Botswana) Township Rollers	6	1	1	4	2	9	−7	4		0–1	0–0	1–0	—

Source: CAF
Rules for classification: Group stage tiebreakers
4 May 2018
21:00 UTC+2

Al-Ahly (Egypt)	0–0	(Tunisia) Espérance de Tunis
	Report

Borg El Arab Stadium, Alexandria
Attendance: 15,000
Referee: Malang Diedhiou (Senegal)
4 May 2018
21:00 UTC+2

Township Rollers (Botswana)	1–0	(Uganda) KCCA
Tshireletso 35'	Report

Botswana National Stadium, Gaborone
Referee: Ahmad Imtehaz Heeralall (Mauritius)

15 May 2018
16:00 UTC+3

KCCA (Uganda)	2–0	(Egypt) Al-Ahly
Juma 74'; Awany 89' (pen.)	Report

Mandela National Stadium, Kira
Referee: Victor Gomes (South Africa)
15 May 2018
20:00 UTC+1

Espérance de Tunis (Tunisia)	4–1	(Botswana) Township Rollers
Belaïli 25'; Badri 46', 90+1'; Mejri 78'	Report	Boy 41'

Stade Olympique de Radès, Tunis
Referee: Bamlak Tessema Weyesa (Ethiopia)

17 July 2018
20:00 UTC+1

Espérance de Tunis (Tunisia)	3–2	(Uganda) KCCA
Badri 30'; Bguir 33'; Mejri 82'	Report	Nunda 18'; Shaban 22'

Stade Olympique de Radès, Tunis
Referee: Noureddine El Jaafari (Morocco)
17 July 2018
21:00 UTC+2

Al-Ahly (Egypt)	3–0	(Botswana) Township Rollers
Azaro 36'; Maâloul 75' (pen.); Mohareb 79'	Report

Borg El Arab Stadium, Alexandria
Attendance: 10,000
Referee: Mustapha Ghorbal (Algeria)

28 July 2018
16:00 UTC+3

KCCA (Uganda)	0–1	(Tunisia) Espérance de Tunis
	Report	Jouini 41'

Mandela National Stadium, Kira
Referee: Janny Sikazwe (Zambia)
28 July 2018
18:00 UTC+2

Township Rollers (Botswana)	0–1	(Egypt) Al-Ahly
	Report	Coulibaly 81'

Botswana National Stadium, Gaborone
Referee: Davies Omweno (Kenya)

17 August 2018
20:00 UTC+1

Espérance de Tunis (Tunisia)	0–1	(Egypt) Al-Ahly
	Report	Azaro 32'

Stade Olympique de Radès, Tunis
Referee: Eric Otogo-Castane (Gabon)
18 August 2018
16:00 UTC+3

KCCA (Uganda)	1–0	(Botswana) Township Rollers
Kaddu 83'	Report

Mandela National Stadium, Kira
Referee: Bakary Gassama (Gambia)

28 August 2018
21:00 UTC+2

Al-Ahly (Egypt)	4–3	(Uganda) KCCA
Azaro 23', 62'; Coulibaly 50'; S. Mohsen 70'	Report	Nunda 40'; Magambo 54'; Okello 82'

Borg El Arab Stadium, Alexandria
Referee: Rédouane Jiyed (Morocco)
28 August 2018
21:00 UTC+2

Township Rollers (Botswana)	0–0	(Tunisia) Espérance de Tunis
	Report

Botswana National Stadium, Gaborone
Referee: Victor Gomes (South Africa)

=== Group B ===
Pos	Team	Pld	W	D	L	GF	GA	GD	Pts	Qualification	TPM	ESS	DHJ	MCA
1	(Democratic Republic of the Congo) TP Mazembe	6	3	3	0	10	4	+6	12	Quarter-finals	—	4–1	1–1	1–0
2	(Algeria) ES Sétif	6	2	2	2	7	9	−2	8	Quarter-finals	1–1	—	2–1	0–1
3	(Morocco) Difaâ El Jadidi	6	1	3	2	6	7	−1	6		0–2	1–1	—	2–0
4	(Algeria) MC Alger	6	1	2	3	4	7	−3	5		1–1	1–2	1–1	—

Source: CAF
Rules for classification: Group stage tiebreakers
4 May 2018
20:00 UTC+1

MC Alger (Algeria)	1–1	(Morocco) Difaâ El Jadidi
Karaoui 82'	Report	Ahaddad 77'

Stade du 5-Juillet-1962, Algiers
Attendance: 55,000
Referee: Sadok Selmi (Tunisia)
5 May 2018
15:00 UTC+2

TP Mazembe (Democratic Republic of the Congo)	4–1	(Algeria) ES Sétif
Malango 10', 23' (pen.); Meschak 63'; Sinkala 82' (pen.)	Report	Nessakh 12'

Stade TP Mazembe, Lubumbashi
Attendance: 17,000
Referee: Hamada Nampiandraza (Madagascar)

15 May 2018
19:00 UTC+0

Difaâ El Jadidi (Morocco)	0–2	(Democratic Republic of the Congo) TP Mazembe
	Report	Malango 51'; Sissoko 54'

Stade El Abdi, El Jadida
Attendance: 12,000
Referee: Joshua Bondo (Botswana)
15 May 2018
20:00 UTC+1

ES Sétif (Algeria)	0–1	(Algeria) MC Alger
	Report	Karaoui 89'

Stade du 8-Mai-1945, Sétif
Attendance: 20,000
Referee: Gehad Grisha (Egypt)

17 July 2018
15:00 UTC+2

TP Mazembe (Democratic Republic of the Congo)	1–0	(Algeria) MC Alger
Meschak 88'	Report

Stade TP Mazembe, Lubumbashi
Referee: Hélder Martins de Carvalho (Angola)
17 July 2018
20:00 UTC+1

ES Sétif (Algeria)	2–1	(Morocco) Difaâ El Jadidi
Bouguelmouna 21'; Ghacha 89'	Report	Bamaamar 4'

Stade du 8-Mai-1945, Sétif
Referee: Bakary Gassama (Gambia)

27 July 2018
20:00 UTC+1

Difaâ El Jadidi (Morocco)	1–1	(Algeria) ES Sétif
Msuva 23'	Report	Bouguelmouna 32' (pen.)

Stade El Abdi, El Jadida
Referee: Ali Lemghaifry (Mauritania)
28 July 2018
20:00 UTC+1

MC Alger (Algeria)	1–1	(Democratic Republic of the Congo) TP Mazembe
Derrardja 70'	Report	Meschak 48'

Mustapha Tchaker Stadium, Blida (Note: MC Alger played their home match against TP Mazembe at Mustapha Tchaker Stadium, Blida, instead of their regular stadium July 5, 1962 Stadium, Algiers, as it was used for athletics at the 2018 African Youth Games.)
Referee: Victor Gomes (South Africa)

17 August 2018
20:00 UTC+1

ES Sétif (Algeria)	1–1	(Democratic Republic of the Congo) TP Mazembe
Bakir 59'	Report	Chongo 76'

Stade du 8-Mai-1945, Sétif
Referee: Maguette N'Diaye (Senegal)
18 August 2018
20:00 UTC+1

Difaâ El Jadidi (Morocco)	2–0	(Algeria) MC Alger
El Megri 29'; Msuva 75'	Report

Stade El Abdi, El Jadida
Referee: Davies Omweno (Kenya)

28 August 2018
15:00 UTC+2

TP Mazembe (Democratic Republic of the Congo)	1–1	(Morocco) Difaâ El Jadidi
Malango 87' (pen.)	Report	Khoukhouche 90+1'

Stade TP Mazembe, Lubumbashi
Referee: Bernard Camille (Seychelles)
28 August 2018
14:00 UTC+1

MC Alger (Algeria)	1–2	(Algeria) ES Sétif
Derrardja 41' (pen.)	Report	Azzi 5' (o.g.); Bouguelmouna 27'

Stade du 5-Juillet-1962, Algiers
Referee: Bamlak Tessema Weyesa (Ethiopia)

=== Group C ===
Pos	Team	Pld	W	D	L	GF	GA	GD	Pts	Qualification	WAC	HOR	MSD	TGP
1	(Morocco) Wydad AC	6	3	3	0	8	2	+6	12	Quarter-finals	—	2–0	1–0	3–0
2	(Guinea) Horoya	6	2	3	1	7	7	0	9	Quarter-finals	1–1	—	2–2	2–1
3	(South Africa) Mamelodi Sundowns	6	1	3	2	5	6	−1	6		1–1	0–0	—	2–1
4	AS Togo-Port	6	1	1	4	4	9	−5	4		0–0	1–2	1–0	—

Source: CAF
Rules for classification: Group stage tiebreakers
5 May 2018
16:00 UTC+0

AS Togo-Port	1–2	(Guinea) Horoya
Bourahana 51'	Report	D. Camara 8'; A. G. Camara 75'

Stade Municipal, Lomé
Referee: Eric Otogo-Castane (Gabon)
5 May 2018
21:00 UTC+2

Mamelodi Sundowns (South Africa)	1–1	(Morocco) Wydad AC
Vilakazi 3'	Report	Haddad 20'

Lucas Masterpieces Moripe Stadium, Pretoria
Referee: Sidi Alioum (Cameroon)

15 May 2018
19:00 UTC+0

Wydad AC (Morocco)	3–0	AS Togo-Port
Ounajem 2'; Aarab 6'; Nahiri 56'	Report

Stade Mohammed V, Casablanca
Referee: Bernard Camille (Seychelles)
22 May 2018 (Note: The Horoya v Mamelodi Sundowns match was originally scheduled to be played on 15 May 2018, 16:00 local time, but was re-scheduled to 22 May 2018, 16:00 local time, following an agreement between the two clubs to avoid a clash with a friendly match between Mamelodi Sundowns and Barcelona.)
16:00 UTC+0

Horoya (Guinea)	2–2	(South Africa) Mamelodi Sundowns
Mandela 51'; A. G. Camara 83'	Report	Billiat 69'; Sirino 79' (pen.)

Stade du 28 Septembre, Conakry
Referee: Janny Sikazwe (Zambia)

17 July 2018
13:00 UTC+0

AS Togo-Port	1–0	(South Africa) Mamelodi Sundowns
Hunlede 40'	Report

Stade Municipal, Lomé
Referee: Youssef Essrayri (Tunisia)
17 July 2018
16:00 UTC+0

Horoya (Guinea)	1–1	(Morocco) Wydad AC
Mandela 29'	Report	Haddad 26'

Stade du 28 Septembre, Conakry
Referee: Hamada Nampiandraza (Madagascar)

27 July 2018
21:00 UTC+2

Mamelodi Sundowns (South Africa)	2–1	AS Togo-Port
Sirino 11'; Vilakazi 15'	Report	Kloukpo 87'

Lucas Masterpieces Moripe Stadium, Pretoria
Referee: Jean-Jacques Ndala Ngambo (DR Congo)
28 July 2018
20:00 UTC+1

Wydad AC (Morocco)	2–0	(Guinea) Horoya
Comara 12'; Ounajem 18'	Report

Stade Mohammed V, Casablanca
Referee: Joshua Bondo (Botswana)

17 August 2018
16:00 UTC+0

Horoya (Guinea)	2–1	AS Togo-Port
Mandela 11'; Sakin 59'	Report	Djadja 51'

Stade du 28 Septembre, Conakry
Referee: Gehad Grisha (Egypt)
17 August 2018
20:00 UTC+1

Wydad AC (Morocco)	1–0	(South Africa) Mamelodi Sundowns
El Asbahi 56'	Report

Stade Mohammed V, Casablanca
Referee: Mehdi Abid Charef (Algeria)

28 August 2018
16:00 UTC+0

AS Togo-Port	0–0	(Morocco) Wydad Casablanca
	Report

Stade Municipal, Lomé
Referee: Hélder Martins de Carvalho (Angola)
28 August 2018
18:00 UTC+2

Mamelodi Sundowns (South Africa)	0–0	(Guinea) Horoya
	Report

Lucas Masterpieces Moripe Stadium, Pretoria
Referee: Sadok Selmi (Tunisia)

=== Group D ===
Pos	Team	Pld	W	D	L	GF	GA	GD	Pts	Qualification	ESS	AGO	ZES	MBS
1	(Tunisia) Étoile du Sahel	6	3	3	0	10	4	+6	12	Quarter-finals	—	1–1	2–1	2–0
2	(Angola) 1º de Agosto	6	2	3	1	6	5	+1	9	Quarter-finals	1–1	—	2–1	2–1
3	(Zambia) ZESCO United	6	1	3	2	7	6	+1	6		1–1	0–0	—	1–1
4	(Eswatini) Mbabane Swallows	6	1	1	4	3	11	−8	4		0–3	1–0	0–3	—

Source: CAF
Rules for classification: Group stage tiebreakers
5 May 2018
15:00 UTC+2

ZESCO United (Zambia)	1–1	(Eswatini) Mbabane Swallows
Owino 65'	Report	Shongwe 81'

Levy Mwanawasa Stadium, Ndola
Referee: Bakary Gassama (Gambia)
5 May 2018
17:00 UTC+1

1º de Agosto (Angola)	1–1	(Tunisia) Étoile du Sahel
Bokamba 43'	Report	Jemal 66'

Estádio 11 de Novembro, Luanda
Referee: Rédouane Jiyed (Morocco)

15 May 2018
15:00 UTC+2

Mbabane Swallows (Eswatini)	1–0	(Angola) 1º de Agosto
Badenhorst 59'	Report

Mavuso Sports Centre, Manzini
Referee: Souleiman Ahmed Djama (Djibouti)
16 May 2018
20:00 UTC+1

Étoile du Sahel (Tunisia)	2–1	(Zambia) ZESCO United
Brigui 46'; Marey 56'	Report	Kambole 90+1'

Stade Olympique de Sousse, Sousse
Referee: Mehdi Abid Charef (Algeria)

17 July 2018
15:00 UTC+2

Mbabane Swallows (Eswatini)	0–3	(Tunisia) Étoile du Sahel
	Report	Aouadhi 14'; Hannachi 32'; Chermiti 71'

Mavuso Sports Centre, Manzini
Referee: Boubou Traoré (Mali)
17 July 2018
15:00 UTC+2

ZESCO United (Zambia)	0–0	(Angola) 1º de Agosto
	Report

Levy Mwanawasa Stadium, Ndola
Referee: Bamlak Tessema Weyesa (Ethiopia)

27 July 2018
17:00 UTC+1

1º de Agosto (Angola)	2–1	(Zambia) ZESCO United
Geraldo 90'; Ungenda 90+8'	Report	Ching'andu 67'

Estádio 11 de Novembro, Luanda
Referee: Bernard Camille (Seychelles)
27 July 2018
20:00 UTC+1

Étoile du Sahel (Tunisia)	2–0	(Eswatini) Mbabane Swallows
Hannachi 21'; Ben Belgacem 89'	Report

Stade Olympique de Sousse, Sousse
Referee: Maguette N'Diaye (Seychelles)

18 August 2018
15:00 UTC+2

Mbabane Swallows (Eswatini)	0–3	(Zambia) ZESCO United
	Report	Kambole 39', 40', 43'

Mavuso Sports Centre, Manzini
Referee: Thierry Nkurunziza (Burundi)
18 August 2018
20:00 UTC+1

Étoile du Sahel (Tunisia)	1–1	(Angola) 1º de Agosto
Chermiti 87'	Report	Massunguna 11'

Stade Olympique de Sousse, Sousse
Referee: Jean-Jacques Ndala Ngambo (DR Congo)

28 August 2018
15:00 UTC+2

ZESCO United (Zambia)	1–1	(Tunisia) Étoile du Sahel
Kambole 8'	Report	Bedoui 70'

Levy Mwanawasa Stadium, Ndola
Referee: Noureddine El Jaafari (Morocco)
28 August 2018
14:00 UTC+1

1º de Agosto (Angola)	2–1	(Eswatini) Mbabane Swallows
Bitumba 34'; Geraldo 38'	Report	Aladeokun 58'

Estádio 11 de Novembro, Luanda
Referee: Ahmad Imtehaz Heeralall (Mauritius)
