= 2018 CAF Champions League =

2018 Total CAF Champions League
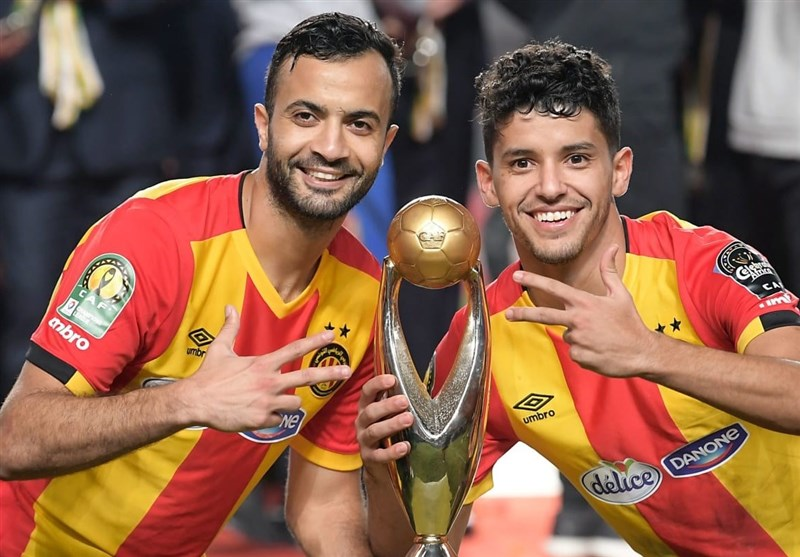

Tournament details
- Dates: 10 February – 9 November 2018
- Teams: 59 (from 47 associations)

Final positions
- Champions: (Tunisia) Espérance de Tunis (3rd title)
- Runners-up: (Egypt) Al Ahly

Tournament statistics
- Matches played: 146
- Goals scored: 351 (2.4 per match)
- Top scorer: (Egypt) Walid Soliman (8 goals)

The 2018 CAF Champions League (officially the 2018 Total CAF Champions League for sponsorship reasons) was the 54th edition of Africa's premier club football tournament organized by the Confederation of African Football (CAF), and the 22nd edition under the current CAF Champions League title.

Espérance de Tunis won the title for the third time, defeating Al Ahly in the final, and qualified as the CAF representative at the 2018 FIFA Club World Cup in the United Arab Emirates, and also earned the right to play against the winners of the 2018 CAF Confederation Cup, Raja Casablanca, in the 2019 CAF Super Cup.

Wydad AC were the defending champions, but were eliminated in the quarter-finals by ES Sétif.

== Association team allocation ==
All 56 CAF member associations may enter the CAF Champions League, with the 12 highest ranked associations according to their CAF 5-year ranking eligible to enter two teams in the competition. As a result, theoretically a maximum of 68 teams could enter the tournament – although this level has never been reached.

For the 2018 CAF Champions League, the CAF uses the 2012–2016 CAF 5-year ranking, which calculates points for each entrant association based on their clubs' performance over those 5 years in the CAF Champions League and CAF Confederation Cup. The criteria for points are the following:

	CAF Champions League	CAF Confederation Cup
Winners	5 points	4 points
Runners-up	4 points	3 points
Losing semi-finalists	3 points	2 points
3rd place in groups	2 points	1 point
4th place in groups	1 point	1 point

The points are multiplied by a coefficient according to the year as follows:

- 2016 – 5
- 2015 – 4
- 2014 – 3
- 2013 – 2
- 2012 – 1

== Teams ==
The following 59 teams from 47 associations entered the competition:

- Teams in **bold** received a bye to the first round.
- The other teams entered the preliminary round.

This was the second highest number of teams in the history of CAF Champions League. The highest number was recorded in 2007 where 60 teams entered.

Associations are shown according to their 2012–2016 CAF 5-year ranking – those with a ranking score have their rank and score indicated.

Associations eligible to enter two teams (Ranked 1–12)
Association	Team	Qualifying method
Egypt (1st – 85 pts)	**Al-Ahly**	2016–17 Egyptian Premier League champions
Egypt (1st – 85 pts)	Misr Lel-Makkasa	2016–17 Egyptian Premier League runners-up
Tunisia (2nd – 76 pts)	Espérance de Tunis	2016–17 Tunisian Ligue Professionnelle 1 champions
Tunisia (2nd – 76 pts)	**Étoile du Sahel**	2016–17 Tunisian Ligue Professionnelle 1 runners-up
(Democratic Republic of the Congo) DR Congo (3rd – 70 pts)	**TP Mazembe**	2016–17 Linafoot champions
(Democratic Republic of the Congo) DR Congo (3rd – 70 pts)	AS Vita Club	2016–17 Linafoot runners-up
Algeria (4th – 62 pts)	ES Sétif	2016–17 Algerian Ligue Professionnelle 1 champions
Algeria (4th – 62 pts)	MC Alger	2016–17 Algerian Ligue Professionnelle 1 runners-up
(South Africa) South Africa (5th – 45 pts)	Bidvest Wits	2016–17 South African Premier Division champions
(South Africa) South Africa (5th – 45 pts)	**Mamelodi Sundowns**	2016–17 South African Premier Division runners-up
Morocco (6th – 41 pts)	**Wydad AC**	Title holders (2017 CAF Champions League winners); 2016–17 Botola champions
Morocco (6th – 41 pts)	Difaâ El Jadidi	2016–17 Botola runners-up
Sudan (7th – 35 pts)	Al-Hilal	2017 Sudan Premier League champions
Sudan (7th – 35 pts)	Al-Merrikh	2017 Sudan Premier League runners-up
(Ivory Coast) Ivory Coast (8th – 21 pts)	ASEC Mimosas	2016–17 Côte d'Ivoire Ligue 1 champions
(Ivory Coast) Ivory Coast (8th – 21 pts)	Williamsville AC	2016–17 Côte d'Ivoire Ligue 1 runners-up
Zambia (9th – 18 pts)	ZESCO United	2017 Zambia Super League champions
Zambia (9th – 18 pts)	Zanaco	2017 Zambia Super League runners-up
(Republic of the Congo) Congo (10th – 16 pts)	AC Léopards	2017 Congo Ligue 1 champions
(Republic of the Congo) Congo (10th – 16 pts)	AS Otohô	2017 Congo Ligue 1 runners-up
Mali (11th – 15 pts)	Stade Malien	2016 Malian Première Division champions
Mali (11th – 15 pts)	AS Real Bamako	2016 Malian Première Division runners-up
Nigeria (12th – 13 pts)	Plateau United	2017 Nigeria Professional Football League champions
Nigeria (12th – 13 pts)	MFM	2017 Nigeria Professional Football League runners-up

Associations eligible to enter one team
Association	Team	Qualifying method
Cameroon (13th – 12 pts)	Eding Sport	2017 Elite One champions
Libya (14th – 8 pts)	Al-Tahaddy	2017 Libyan Premier League CAF competition playoff winners
Ghana (15th – 7 pts)	Aduana Stars	2017 Ghanaian Premier League champions
Tanzania (16th – 5 pts)	Young Africans	2016–17 Tanzanian Premier League champions
Angola (17th – 3 pts)	1º de Agosto	2017 Girabola champions
Ethiopia (18th – 2 pts)	Saint George	2016–17 Ethiopian Premier League champions
Benin	Buffles du Borgou	2017 Benin Premier League champions
Botswana	Township Rollers	2016–17 Botswana Premier League champions
(Burkina Faso) Burkina Faso	Rail Club du Kadiogo	2016–17 Burkinabé Premier League champions
Burundi	LLB Académic FC	2016–17 Burundi Premier League champions
(Central African Republic) Central African Republic	Olympic Real de Bangui	2016–17 Central African Republic League champions
Comoros	Ngaya Club	2017 Comoros Premier League champions
(Equatorial Guinea) Equatorial Guinea	Leones Vegetarianos	2017 Equatoguinean Primera División champions
Gabon	CF Mounana	2016–17 Gabon Championnat National D1 champions
(The Gambia) Gambia	Armed Forces	2016–17 GFA League First Division champions
Guinea	Horoya	2016–17 Guinée Championnat National champions
Guinea-Bissau	Sport Bissau e Benfica	2016–17 Campeonato Nacional da Guiné-Bissau champions
Kenya	Gor Mahia	2017 Kenyan Premier League champions
Lesotho	Bantu	2016–17 Lesotho Premier League champions
Liberia	LISCR	2016–17 Liberian First Division League champions
Madagascar	CNaPS Sport	2017 THB Champions League champions
Malawi	Mighty Wanderers	2017 Malawi Premier Division leaders at entry deadline
Mauritania	ASAC Concorde	2016–17 Ligue 1 Mauritania champions
Mauritius	Pamplemousses	2016–17 Mauritian Premier League champions
Mozambique	UD Songo	2017 Moçambola champions
Niger	AS FAN	2016–17 Niger Premier League champions
Rwanda	Rayon Sports	2016–17 Rwanda National Football League champions
Senegal	Génération Foot	2016–17 Senegal Premier League champions
Seychelles	Saint Louis Suns United	2017 Seychelles First Division champions
(South Sudan) South Sudan	Al-Salam Wau	2017 South Sudan Football Championship champions
(Eswatini) Swaziland	Mbabane Swallows	2016–17 Swazi Premier League champions
Togo	AS Togo-Port	2016–17 Togolese Championnat National champions
Uganda	KCCA	2016–17 Uganda Super League champions
Zanzibar	JKU	2016–17 Zanzibar Premier League champions
Zimbabwe	FC Platinum	2017 Zimbabwe Premier Soccer League champions

Notes

1. Mali (MLI): Mali were represented by Stade Malien and AS Real Bamako, the 2016 Malian Première Division champions and runners-up, as the 2017 Malian Première Division was not completed by the end of the year.

Associations which did not enter a team

- (Cape Verde) Cape Verde
- Chad
- Djibouti
- Eritrea
- Namibia
- Réunion
- (São Tomé and Príncipe) São Tomé and Príncipe
- (Sierra Leone) Sierra Leone
- Somalia
Location of teams of the 2018 CAF Champions League.
Red: Preliminary round; Green: First Round;
Brown: Group A; Orange: Group B; Yellow: Group C; Blue: Group D.

== Schedule ==
The schedule of the competition was as follows (matches scheduled in midweek in italics). The regulations were modified with an additional draw before the quarter-finals. Effective from the Champions League group stage, weekend matches were played on Fridays and Saturdays while midweek matches were played on Tuesdays, with some exceptions. Kick-off times were also fixed at 13:00 (Saturdays and Tuesdays only), 16:00 and 19:00 GMT.

Phase	Round	Draw date	First leg	Second leg
Qualifying	Preliminary round	13 December 2017 (Cairo, Egypt)	9–11 February 2018	20–21 February 2018
Qualifying	First round	13 December 2017 (Cairo, Egypt)	6–7 March 2018	16–18 March 2018
Group stage	Matchday 1	21 March 2018 (Cairo, Egypt)	4–5 May 2018	
Group stage	Matchday 2	21 March 2018 (Cairo, Egypt)	15 May 2018	
Group stage	Matchday 3	21 March 2018 (Cairo, Egypt)	17 July 2018	
Group stage	Matchday 4	21 March 2018 (Cairo, Egypt)	27–28 July 2018	
Group stage	Matchday 5	21 March 2018 (Cairo, Egypt)	17–18 August 2018	
Group stage	Matchday 6	21 March 2018 (Cairo, Egypt)	28 August 2018	
Knockout stage	Quarter-finals	3 September 2018 (Cairo, Egypt)	14–15 September 2018	21–22 September 2018
Knockout stage	Semi-finals	3 September 2018 (Cairo, Egypt)	2 October 2018	23 October 2018
Knockout stage	Final	3 September 2018 (Cairo, Egypt)	2 November 2018	9 November 2018

== Qualifying rounds ==
The draw for the preliminary round and first round was held on 13 December 2017 at the CAF headquarters in Cairo, Egypt. In the qualifying rounds, each tie was played on a home-and-away two-legged basis. If the aggregate score was tied after the second leg, the away goals rule would be applied, and if still tied, extra time would not be played, and the penalty shoot-out would be used to determine the winner (Regulations III. 13 & 14).

=== Preliminary round ===
Team 1	Agg.	Team 2	1st leg	2nd leg
Saint George (Ethiopia)	w/o (Note: Saint George won on walkover after Al-Salam Wau failed to arrive for the first leg.)	(South Sudan) Al-Salam Wau	—	—
CNaPS Sport (Madagascar)	2–2 (a)	(Uganda) KCCA	2–1	0–1
Zanaco (Zambia)	6–1	(The Gambia) Armed Forces	3–0	3–1
Bantu (Lesotho)	5–5 (a)	(Eswatini) Mbabane Swallows	2–4	3–1
Stade Malien (Mali)	1–2	(Ivory Coast) Williamsville AC	1–1	0–1
Al-Tahaddy (Libya)	1–2	(Ghana) Aduana Stars	1–0	0–2
ES Sétif (Algeria)	6–0	(Central African Republic) Olympic Real de Bangui	6–0	0–0
Rail Club du Kadiogo (Burkina Faso)	1–2	(Gabon) CF Mounana	1–0	0–2
AS Real Bamako (Mali)	1–2	(Nigeria) MFM	1–1	0–1
AS Otôho (Republic of the Congo)	2–9	(Algeria) MC Alger	2–0	0–9
AS FAN (Niger)	1–3	(Guinea) Horoya	1–3	0–0
Génération Foot (Senegal)	2–0	(Egypt) Misr Lel-Makkasa	2–0	0–0
Young Africans (Tanzania)	2–1	(Seychelles) Saint Louis Suns United	1–0	1–1
Township Rollers (Botswana)	4–2	(Sudan) Al-Merrikh	3–0	1–2
Gor Mahia (Kenya)	3–1	(Equatorial Guinea) Leones Vegetarianos	2–0	1–1
ASAC Concorde (Mauritania)	1–6	(Tunisia) Espérance de Tunis	1–1	0–5
Plateau United (Nigeria)	4–0	(Cameroon) Eding Sport	3–0	1–0
AC Léopards (Republic of the Congo)	3–3 (3–4 p)	AS Togo-Port	2–1	1–2
LISCR (Liberia)	1–3	(Sudan) Al-Hilal	1–0	0–3
JKU (Zanzibar)	0–7	(Zambia) ZESCO United	0–0	0–7
Buffles du Borgou (Benin)	3–4	(Ivory Coast) ASEC Mimosas	1–1	2–3
Ngaya Club (Comoros)	1–3	(Mozambique) UD Songo	1–1	0–2
Difaâ El Jadidi (Morocco)	10–0	(Guinea-Bissau) Sport Bissau e Benfica	10–0	0–0
AS Vita Club (Democratic Republic of the Congo)	6–1	(Malawi) Mighty Wanderers	4–0	2–1
1º de Agosto (Angola)	5–1	(Zimbabwe) FC Platinum	3–0	2–1
Bidvest Wits (South Africa)	2–1	(Mauritius) Pamplemousses	2–0	0–1
Rayon Sports (Rwanda)	2–1	(Burundi) LLB Académic FC	1–1	1–0

=== First round ===
The 16 winners of the first round advanced to the group stage, while the 16 losers of the first round entered the Confederation Cup play-off round.

Team 1	Agg.	Team 2	1st leg	2nd leg
Saint George (Ethiopia)	0–1	(Uganda) KCCA	0–0	0–1
Zanaco (Zambia)	1–3	(Eswatini) Mbabane Swallows	1–2	0–1
Wydad AC (Morocco)	7–4	(Ivory Coast) Williamsville AC	7–2	0–2
Aduana Stars (Ghana)	1–4	(Algeria) ES Sétif	1–0	0–4
Al-Ahly (Egypt)	7–1	(Gabon) CF Mounana	4–0	3–1
MFM (Nigeria)	2–7	(Algeria) MC Alger	2–1	0–6
Horoya (Guinea)	4–1	(Senegal) Génération Foot	2–1	2–0
Young Africans (Tanzania)	1–2	(Botswana) Township Rollers	1–2	0–0
Gor Mahia (Kenya)	0–1	(Tunisia) Espérance de Tunis	0–0	0–1
Étoile du Sahel (Tunisia)	4–3	(Nigeria) Plateau United	4–2	0–1
AS Togo-Port	3–3 (a)	(Sudan) Al-Hilal	2–0	1–3
ZESCO United (Zambia)	2–2 (a)	(Ivory Coast) ASEC Mimosas	0–1	2–1
TP Mazembe (Democratic Republic of the Congo)	4–3	(Mozambique) UD Songo	4–0	0–3
Difaâ El Jadidi (Morocco)	3–2	(Democratic Republic of the Congo) AS Vita Club	1–0	2–2
1º de Agosto (Angola)	1–1 (3–2 p)	(South Africa) Bidvest Wits	1–0	0–1
Rayon Sports (Rwanda)	0–2	(South Africa) Mamelodi Sundowns	0–0	0–2

== Group stage ==
The draw for the group stage was held on 21 March 2018, 19:00 EET (UTC+2), at the Ritz Carlton in Cairo, Egypt. The 16 teams, all winners of the first round of qualifying, were drawn into four groups of four. The teams were seeded by their performances in the CAF competitions for the previous five seasons (CAF 5-year ranking points shown in parentheses). Each group contained one team from each of Pot 1, Pot 2, Pot 3, and Pot 4, and each team was drawn into one of the positions in their group.

Pot	Pot 1	Pot 2	Pot 3	Pot 4
Teams	(Democratic Republic of the Congo) TP Mazembe (75 pts); (Egypt) Al Ahly (58 pts); (Tunisia) Étoile du Sahel (49 pts); (Morocco) Wydad AC (46 pts)	(South Africa) Mamelodi Sundowns (39 pts); (Zambia) ZESCO United (26 pts); (Tunisia) Espérance de Tunis (24.5 pts); (Algeria) ES Sétif (18.5 pts)	(Algeria) MC Alger (10 pts); (Uganda) KCCA (5 pts); (Guinea) Horoya (5 pts); (Eswatini) Mbabane Swallows (5 pts)	(Angola) 1º de Agosto; (Botswana) Township Rollers; (Morocco) Difaâ El Jadidi; AS Togo-Port

In the group stage, each group was played on a home-and-away round-robin basis. The winners and runners-up of each group advanced to the quarter-finals of the knockout stage.

Tiebreakers
The teams were ranked according to points (3 points for a win, 1 point for a draw, 0 points for a loss). If tied on points, tiebreakers were applied in the following order (Regulations III. 20 & 21):
1. Points in head-to-head matches among tied teams;
2. Goal difference in head-to-head matches among tied teams;
3. Goals scored in head-to-head matches among tied teams;
4. Away goals scored in head-to-head matches among tied teams;
5. If more than two teams are tied, and after applying all head-to-head criteria above, a subset of teams are still tied, all head-to-head criteria above are reapplied exclusively to this subset of teams;
6. Goal difference in all group matches;
7. Goals scored in all group matches;
8. Away goals scored in all group matches;
9. Drawing of lots.

=== Group A ===
Pos	Team	Pld	W	D	L	GF	GA	GD	Pts	Qualification	AHL	EST	KCC	ROL
1	(Egypt) Al Ahly	6	4	1	1	9	5	+4	13	Quarter-finals	—	0–0	4–3	3–0
2	(Tunisia) Espérance de Tunis	6	3	2	1	8	4	+4	11	Quarter-finals	0–1	—	3–2	4–1
3	(Uganda) KCCA	6	2	0	4	8	9	−1	6		2–0	0–1	—	1–0
4	(Botswana) Township Rollers	6	1	1	4	2	9	−7	4		0–1	0–0	1–0	—

Source: CAF

=== Group B ===
Pos	Team	Pld	W	D	L	GF	GA	GD	Pts	Qualification	TPM	ESS	DHJ	MCA
1	(Democratic Republic of the Congo) TP Mazembe	6	3	3	0	10	4	+6	12	Quarter-finals	—	4–1	1–1	1–0
2	(Algeria) ES Sétif	6	2	2	2	7	9	−2	8	Quarter-finals	1–1	—	2–1	0–1
3	(Morocco) Difaâ El Jadidi	6	1	3	2	6	7	−1	6		0–2	1–1	—	2–0
4	(Algeria) MC Alger	6	1	2	3	4	7	−3	5		1–1	1–2	1–1	—

Source: CAF

=== Group C ===
Pos	Team	Pld	W	D	L	GF	GA	GD	Pts	Qualification	WAC	HOR	MSD	TGP
1	(Morocco) Wydad AC	6	3	3	0	8	2	+6	12	Quarter-finals	—	2–0	1–0	3–0
2	(Guinea) Horoya	6	2	3	1	7	7	0	9	Quarter-finals	1–1	—	2–2	2–1
3	(South Africa) Mamelodi Sundowns	6	1	3	2	5	6	−1	6		1–1	0–0	—	2–1
4	AS Togo-Port	6	1	1	4	4	9	−5	4		0–0	1–2	1–0	—

Source: CAF

=== Group D ===
Pos	Team	Pld	W	D	L	GF	GA	GD	Pts	Qualification	ESS	AGO	ZES	MBS
1	(Tunisia) Étoile du Sahel	6	3	3	0	10	4	+6	12	Quarter-finals	—	1–1	2–1	2–0
2	(Angola) 1º de Agosto	6	2	3	1	6	5	+1	9	Quarter-finals	1–1	—	2–1	2–1
3	(Zambia) ZESCO United	6	1	3	2	7	6	+1	6		1–1	0–0	—	1–1
4	(Eswatini) Mbabane Swallows	6	1	1	4	3	11	−8	4		0–3	1–0	0–3	—

Source: CAF

== Knockout stage ==
In the knockout stage, the eight teams played a single-elimination tournament. Each tie was played on a home-and-away two-legged basis. If the aggregate score was tied after the second leg, the away goals rule would be applied, and if still tied, extra time would not be played, and the penalty shoot-out would be used to determine the winner (Regulations III. 26 & 27).

=== Bracket ===
The bracket was decided after the draw for the knockout stage (quarter-finals and semi-finals), which was held on 3 September 2018, 20:00 EET (UTC+2), at the CAF headquarters in Cairo, Egypt.

Quarter-finals
(Guinea) Horoya	0	0	0
(Egypt) Al Ahly	0	4	4
(Algeria) ES Sétif	1	0	1
(Morocco) Wydad AC	0	0	0
(Angola) 1º de Agosto	0	1	1 (a)
(Democratic Republic of the Congo) TP Mazembe	0	1	1
(Tunisia) Espérance de Tunis	2	1	3
(Tunisia) Étoile du Sahel	1	0	1

Semi-finals
(Egypt) Al Ahly	2	1	3
(Algeria) ES Sétif	0	2	2
(Angola) 1º de Agosto	1	2	3
(Tunisia) Espérance de Tunis	0	4	4

Final
(Egypt) Al Ahly	3	0	3
(Tunisia) Espérance de Tunis	1	3	4

=== Quarter-finals ===
In the quarter-finals, the winners of one group played the runners-up of another group (teams from same group could not play each other), with the group winners hosting the second leg, and the matchups decided by draw.

Team 1	Agg.	Team 2	1st leg	2nd leg
1º de Agosto (Angola)	1–1 (a)	(Democratic Republic of the Congo) TP Mazembe	0–0	1–1
Espérance de Tunis (Tunisia)	3–1	(Tunisia) Étoile du Sahel	2–1	1–0
ES Sétif (Algeria)	1–0	(Morocco) Wydad AC	1–0	0–0
Horoya (Guinea)	0–4	(Egypt) Al Ahly	0–0	0–4

=== Semi-finals ===
In the semi-finals, the four quarter-final winners played in two ties, with the matchups and order of legs decided by draw.

Team 1	Agg.	Team 2	1st leg	2nd leg
Al-Ahly (Egypt)	3–2	(Algeria) ES Sétif	2–0	1–2
1º de Agosto (Angola)	3–4	(Tunisia) Espérance de Tunis	1–0	2–4

=== Final ===
In the final, the two semi-final winners played each other, with the order of legs determined by the semi-final draw.

2 November 2018
21:00 UTC+2

Al Ahly (Egypt)	3–1	(Tunisia) Espérance de Tunis
Soliman 34' (pen.), 77' (pen.); El Solia 58'	Report	Belaïli 64' (pen.)

Borg El Arab Stadium, Alexandria
Attendance: 60,000
Referee: Mehdi Abid Charef (Algeria)
9 November 2018
20:00 UTC+1

Espérance de Tunis (Tunisia)	3–0	(Egypt) Al Ahly
Bguir 45+1', 54'; Badri 86'	Report

Stade Olympique de Radès, Tunis
Attendance: 60,000
Referee: Bamlak Tessema Weyesa (Ethiopia)

Espérance de Tunis won 4–3 on aggregate.

== Top goalscorers ==
Team eliminated / inactive for this round.

Rank	Player	Team	MD1	MD2	MD3	MD4	MD5	MD6	QF1	QF2	SF1	SF2	F1	F2	Total
1	(Tunisia) Anice Badri	(Tunisia) Espérance de Tunis		2	1							1		1	5
1	(Zambia) Lazarous Kambole	(Zambia) ZESCO United		1			3	1							5
1	(Egypt) Walid Soliman	(Egypt) Al Ahly								1	1	1	2		5
4	(Morocco) Walid Azaro	(Egypt) Al Ahly			1		1	2							4
4	(Democratic Republic of the Congo) Ben Malango	(Democratic Republic of the Congo) TP Mazembe	2	1				1							4
6	(Algeria) Youcef Belaïli	(Tunisia) Espérance de Tunis		1								1	1		3
6	(Democratic Republic of the Congo) Lompala Bokamba	(Angola) 1º de Agosto	1							1		1			3
6	(Algeria) El Habib Bouguelmouna	(Algeria) ES Sétif			1	1		1							3
6	(Tunisia) Saad Bguir	(Tunisia) Espérance de Tunis			1									2	3
6	(Democratic Republic of the Congo) Meschak Elia	(Democratic Republic of the Congo) TP Mazembe	1		1	1									3
6	(Angola) Geraldo	(Angola) 1º de Agosto				1		1				1			3
6	(Burkina Faso) Ocansey Mandela	(Guinea) Horoya		1	1		1								3
6	(Egypt) Islam Mohareb	(Egypt) Al Ahly			1					1	1				3

== Prize money ==
In 2018, the fixed amount of prize money paid to the clubs is as follows:

Final position	Prize money
Champion	US$2.5 million
Runner-up	US$1.25 million
Semi-finalists	US$800,000
Quarter-finalists	US$650,000
3rd in group stage	US$550,000
4th in group stage	US$550,000

Note: National associations receive an additional equivalent share of 5% for each amount awarded to clubs.

== See also ==
- 2018 CAF Confederation Cup
- 2018 FIFA Club World Cup
- 2019 CAF Super Cup
