= Bertrand Esther =

Seychellois football player

Personal information
- Full name: Bertrand Esther
- Date of birth: 17 September 1986 (age 40)
- Place of birth: Seychelles
- Position: Defender

International career
Years	Team	Apps	(Gls)
2011–	Seychelles	2	(0)

Bertrand Esther (born September 17, 1985) is a Seychellois football player. He is a defender on the Seychelles national football team. He also plays for the Saint Louis Suns United.
