= Motsholetsi Sikele =

Motswana footballer

Personal information
- Full name: Motsholetsi Sikele
- Date of birth: 1 December 1991 (age 34)
- Place of birth: Lobatse
- Height: 1.69 m (5 ft 6 1/2 in)
- Position: Winger

Team information
- Current team: Township Rollers
- Number: 28

Youth career
- 2006–2008: Lobatse Stars FC Development

Senior career*
Years	Team	Apps	(Gls)
2008–2012	BMC		
2012–	Township Rollers		

International career^{‡}
2018–	Botswana	2	(0)
- * Club domestic league appearances and goals as of 29 August 2009 ‡ National team caps and goals as of 4 October 2019

Motsholetsi Sikele (born 1 December 1991) is a Motswana footballer playing for Tonota F.C in the Botswana Premier League. He is a full Botswana international, having made his debut on 9 September 2018.

== Honours ==
=== Clubs ===
Township Rollers

- Botswana Premier League (5): 2013–14, 2015–16, 2016–17, 2017–18, 2018–19
- Mascom Top 8 Cup: 2017–18
