= Bamlak Tessema Weyesa =

Ethiopian football referee (born 1980)

Bamlak Tessema
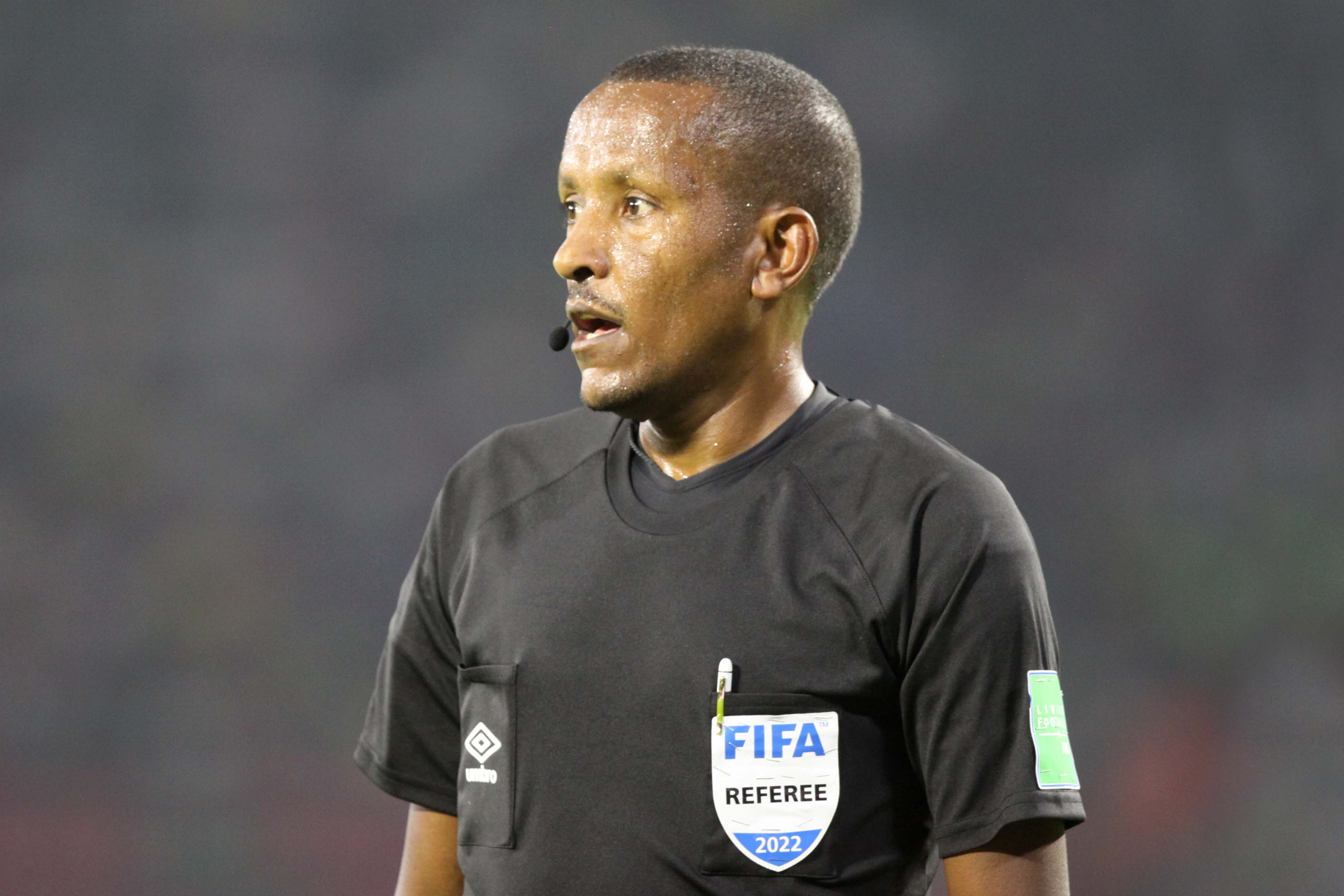
- Full name: Bamlak Tessema Weyesa
- Born: 30 December 1982 (age 43); Addis Ababa, Ethiopia

International
Years	League	Role
2009–	FIFA listed	Referee

Bamlak Tessema Weyesa (born 30 December 1982) is an Ethiopian football referee.

He is also a medical researcher, a clinical coordinator and a sociology graduate (2012) from Addis Ababa University.

He started to referee in 2003 and became an international FIFA referee in 2009 with Djibouti vs Somalia in 2010 as his first international match.

He has been very active during CECAFA Cup 2010 where he officiated 5 matches including the Final between Tanzania and Ivory Coast and CECAFA Cup 2011 (4 matches). In 2012 he was also appointed for one Champions League match in Tanzania (1st round), and one CAF Confederation Cup in Egypt (2nd round).

He became a FIFA referee in 2009. He has served as a referee at the 2014 FIFA World Cup qualifiers, beginning with the first-round match between Djibouti and Namibia.

Fans have praised referee Bamlak Tessema Weyesa for his officiating during Senegal’s semi-final win over Burkina Faso at the Africa Cup of Nations where he overturned two penalty decisions following VAR reviews.

== See also ==
- List of football referees
