= List of football clubs in Liberia =

For a complete list see Category:Football clubs in Liberia

== B ==
- Bame Monrovia
- Barrack Young Controllers Football Club

== D ==
- Devereux Football Club
- Desert Football Club
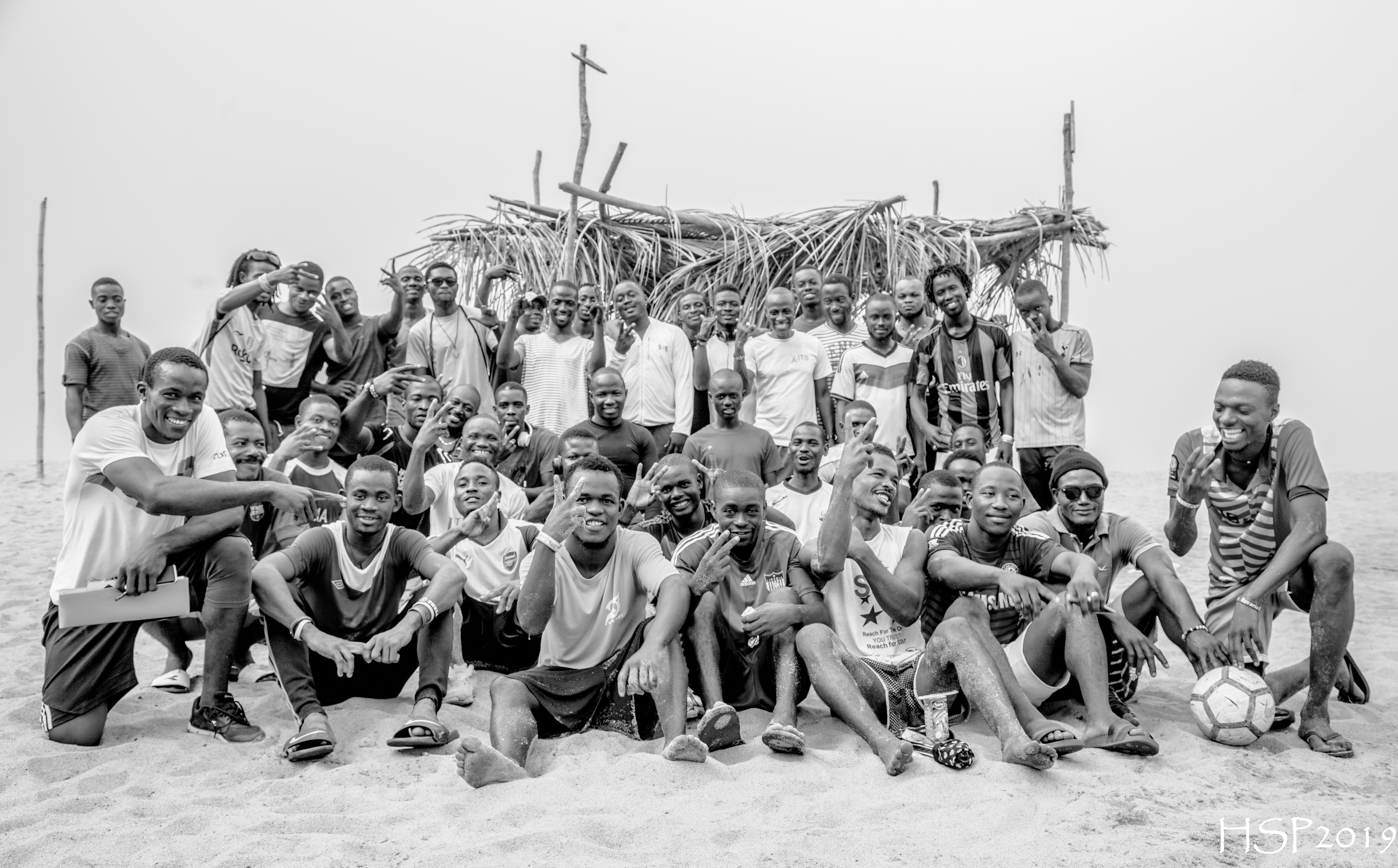
  The Desert FC is a Monrovia, Mamba Point based amateur soccer club with regular training and tournaments. Community engagement and improvement through sport. Manager and trainer is Mr. Torh Doteh. Picture of team after tournament January 2018.

== F ==
- FC Fassell
- Fatu Football Club
- FCAK-Liberia

== G ==
- Ganta Black Stars
- Gedi & Sons Football Club

== I ==
- Innterfada f.c

== J ==
- Jasmine Rangers Football Club
- Jubilee FC
- Junior Professional Football Club

== K ==
- Keitrace FC

== L ==
- Liberia Petroleum Refining Company Oilers
- Liberia Ship Corporate Registry Football Club

== M ==
- Mark Professionals
- Mighty Barrolle
- Mighty Blue Angels FC
- Monrovia Black Star Football Club
- Monrovia Club Breweries
- Monrovia FC
- Muscat FC (Liberia)

== N ==
- National Port Authority Anchors
- Nimba Football Club
- Nimba United Football Club

== S ==
- Saint Joseph Warriors Football Club
- St Anthony FC

== U ==
- United Soccer Ambassador Football Club

== W ==
- Watanga Football Club
