= 2022–23 Liberian First Division =

LFA First Division
- Season: 2022–23
- Dates: 31 August 2022 – May 2023
- Champions: LISCR FC
- Matches: 77
- Goals: 201 (2.61 per match)
- Top goalscorer: Christopher Jackson (22 goals)
- Longest winning run: 5 games Muscat
- Longest unbeaten run: 13 games Bea Mountain
- Longest winless run: 10 games Nimba United
- Longest losing run: 5 games Nimba United; Sandi
- All statistics correct as of 13 November 2022.

The 2022–23 LFA First Division (known as the Orange First Division for sponsorship reasons) is the 49th season of the LFA First Division (formerly the Liberian Premier League), the top-tier football league in Liberia, since the league's establishment in 1956.

Watanga are the defending champions, having won the 2021–22 season.

== Team changes ==
The following teams have changed division since the 2021–22 season.

=== To National Second Division ===
Relegated from First Division

- MC Breweries

=== From National Second Division ===
Promoted from Second Division

- Cece United (promoted as champions)
- Muscat
- Jubilee

== Teams ==
=== Stadia and locations ===
Locations of the 2022–23 First Division teams

Note: Table lists in alphabetical order.

Team	Location	Stadium
Bea Mountain	Gardnersville	Tusa Field
Cece United	Monrovia	Antoinette Tubman Stadium
Freeport	Monrovia	Antoinette Tubman Stadium
Heaven Eleven	Yekepa	Yekepa Stadium
Invincible Eleven	Gardnersville	Tusa Field
Jubilee	Monrovia	Antoinette Tubman Stadium
LISCR	Monrovia	Antoinette Tubman Stadium
LPRC Oilers	Paynesville	Samuel Kanyon Doe Sports Complex
Mighty Barrolle	Buchanan	Doris Williams Stadium
Muscat	Monrovia	Antoinette Tubman Stadium
Nimba Kwado	Sanniquellie	Sanniquellie Sports Stadium
Nimba United	Mount Barclay	North Star Sports Stadium
Sandi	Kakata	Nancy B Doe Sports Stadium
Watanga	Paynesville	Samuel Kanyon Doe Sports Complex

=== Number of teams by county ===
Position	County	Number	Teams
1	Montserrado	9	Bea Mountain, Cece United, Freeport, Invincible Eleven, Jubilee LISCR, LPRC Oilers, Muscat and Watanga
2	Nimba	3	Heaven Eleven, Nimba Kwado and Nimba United
3	Grand Bassa	1	Mighty Barrolle
3	Margibi	1	Sandi

== League table ==
Pos	Team	Pld	W	D	L	GF	GA	GD	Pts	Promotion or relegation
1	LISCR (C, Q)	26	19	5	2	61	22	+39	62	Qualification for CAF Champions League first qualifying round
2	Bea Mountain	26	16	10	0	56	12	+44	58	Standby for Confederation Cup first qualifying round (Note: If the league winner also win the LFA Cup, the league runner-up will qualify for the Confederation Cup.)
3	Watanga	26	14	7	5	55	27	+28	49	
4	Mighty Barrolle	26	10	9	7	53	34	+19	39	
5	Heaven Eleven	26	10	9	7	45	40	+5	39	
6	Nimba Kwado	26	9	10	7	28	22	+6	37	
7	Muscat	26	10	4	12	37	50	−13	34	
8	LPRC Oilers	26	9	6	11	44	49	−5	33	
9	Cece United	26	7	9	10	39	39	0	30	
10	Invincible Eleven	26	8	5	13	29	48	−19	29	
11	Freeport	26	7	5	14	32	42	−10	26	
12	Jubilee (R)	26	6	8	12	34	47	−13	26	Relegation to Second Division
13	Nimba United (R)	26	3	9	14	16	53	−37	18	Relegation to Second Division
14	Sandi (R)	26	6	0	20	28	72	−44	18	Relegation to Second Division

Updated to match(es) played on May 2023. Source: Soccerway
Rules for classification: 1) Points; 2) Head-to-head points; 3) Head-to-head goal difference; 4) Head-to-head goals scored; 5) Goal difference; 6) Goals scored.
(C) Champions; (Q) Qualified for the phase indicated; (R) Relegated

== Results ==
Home \ Away	BEA	CUN	FRE	HEA	INV	JUB	LIS	LOI	MIG	MUS	NKW	NUN	SAN	WAT
Bea Mountain					4–0	1–1	0–0		1–1	1–0	1–0		4–0	2–1
Cece United	0–0		0–0	1–2			0–2	2–3		1–1	0–0	4–0		
Freeport	0–1	1–3			1–2	2–2			0–3	1–2	1–2		1–4	
Heaven Eleven	1–2		2–1			4–1		2–4	3–3	0–2	2–0	1–1	3–0	
Invincible Eleven		2–0		0–0			0–1	2–1	1–1		1–5	1–1		1–2
Jubilee	1–5	1–4			3–0			0–1		2–3				0–0
LISCR		3–1	1–0	2–0		2–1		1–2		3–2		2–1		1–2
LPRC Oilers	0–0		0–1		1–1	1–2			2–4	1–2		0–0	1–3	
Mighty Barrolle		0–0		5–0	2–0	2–5	2–2	2–0			0–1			2–4
Muscat	0–2		0–2		2–0		1–5		2–1		0–0		2–0	1–5
Nimba Kwado		1–1		0–0		1–1	1–1	1–1				2–0	3–1	1–0
Nimba United	0–2		0–2	1–1	1–1	0–0			0–0	1–1			1–0	
Sandi		1–5	1–2		2–1	3–1	0–4		0–2		0–1	1–0		2–3
Watanga	1–1	1–1	2–0	1–1		4–2	0–0	3–3				1–0		

Updated to match(es) played on 19 February 2023. Source: Soccerway
Legend: Blue = home team win; Yellow = draw; Red = away team win.

== Season statistics ==
As of 2 February 2023.

=== Top scorers ===
Rank	Player	Club	Goals
1	(Liberia) Christopher Jackson	LISCR	22
2	(Liberia) Gibson Freeman	Cece United	10
3	(Liberia) Abraham Kuyateh	Watanga	8
3	(Liberia) Robin Hney	Cece United	8
3	(Liberia) Abdulai Bility	Bea Mountain	8

Source: Soccerway

==== Hat-tricks ====
Player	For	Against	Result	Date
(Liberia) Nyah Dahn	Kimba Kwado	Invincible Eleven	5–1 (A)	24 November 2022

== Attendances ==
Liberian top-flight football league games often take place in front of hundreds of spectators. The average league attendance was 206 in the 2022-23 season:

#	Club	Average
1	LISCR	320
2	Watanga FC	283
3	Mighty Barrolle	261
4	Invincible Eleven	255
5	Shaita FC	248
6	Bea Mountain	222
7	LPRC Oilers	203
8	Paynesville FC	202
9	Heaven Eleven	198
10	Nimba Kwado	183
11	Muscat	180
12	Cece United	171
13	Freeport	164
14	Jubilee	150
15	Sandi	132
16	Nimba United	123
