= 2009 Liberian Premier League =

Association football season in Liberia

Statistics of Liberian Premier League for the 2009 season.

== League standings ==
Pos	Team	Pld	W	D	L	GF	GA	GD	Pts
1	Mighty Barrolle	34	22	7	5	49	25	+24	73
2	LPRC Oilers	34	18	12	4	47	18	+29	66
3	Barrack Young Controllers	34	19	7	8	48	22	+26	64
4	LISCR	33	13	10	10	43	32	+11	49
5	National Port Authority Anchors	32	13	10	9	40	29	+11	49
6	Monrovia Club Breweries	31	13	10	8	33	25	+8	49
7	Mighty Blue Angels FC	33	11	13	9	35	30	+5	46
8	UMC Roots FC	33	11	13	9	37	21	+16	46
9	Gedi & Sons Football Club	33	10	13	10	29	24	+5	43
10	Watanga FC	32	11	10	11	35	35	0	43
11	Jasmine Rangers	33	10	12	11	37	37	0	42
12	Invincible Eleven	31	9	10	12	30	35	−5	37
13	Adorence FC	34	9	10	15	41	49	−8	37
14	Jubilee FC	33	9	9	15	42	58	−16	36
15	Monrovia Black Star FC	32	9	8	15	41	38	+3	35
16	United Soccer Ambassadors FC	33	7	10	16	32	53	−21	31
17	Devereux FC	32	6	9	17	29	49	−20	27
18	FC Azziz Kara	33	3	9	21	23	52	−29	18
