= 2000–01 Liberian Premier League =

Football season in Liberia

There were eighteen teams who competed in the Liberian Premier League in the 2000–01 season. Mighty Barrolle from Monrovia won the championship.

== Group stage ==
=== Group A ===
Pos	Team	Pld	W	D	L	GF	GA	GD	Pts
1	Invincible Eleven	16	10	5	1	25	9	+16	35
2	Mark Professionals	14	9	2	3	22	10	+12	29
3	Liberia Petroleum Refining Company Oilers	16	7	6	3	18	11	+7	27
4	Liberia United	15	6	5	4	16	15	+1	23
5	Monrovia Black Star Football Club	16	5	5	6	10	13	−3	20
6	Monrovia Club Breweries	15	5	3	7	15	16	−1	18
7	Olympic FC	15	4	3	8	12	11	+1	15
8	Defence Invaders	15	1	6	8	11	23	−12	9
9	Baccus Marine	14	2	3	9	7	19	−12	9

=== Group B ===
Pos	Team	Pld	W	D	L	GF	GA	GD	Pts
1	Mighty Barrolle	15	9	5	1	24	17	+7	32
2	BUSA	16	9	4	3	25	13	+12	31
3	St Anthony FC	14	9	2	3	32	14	+18	29
4	Junior Professional FC	15	4	9	2	18	13	+5	21
5	Exodus	15	6	2	7	23	24	−1	20
6	National Port Authority Anchors	16	3	7	6	23	22	+1	16
7	Barcelona	13	3	6	4	12	15	−3	15
8	Survivors FC	15	2	3	10	5	23	−18	9
9	Fulani FC	15	2	3	10	11	41	−30	9

== Final ==
Pos	Team	Pld	W	D	L	GF	GA	GD	Pts
1	Mighty Barrolle	9	6	2	1	11	3	+8	20
2	Liberia Petroleum Refining Company Oilers	9	6	1	2	12	4	+8	19
3	Invincible Eleven	9	5	3	1	21	10	+11	18
4	St Anthony FC	9	4	3	2	15	6	+9	15
5	Mark Professionals	9	4	3	2	9	7	+2	15
6	BUSA	9	3	3	3	10	12	−2	12
7	Barcelona	9	2	1	6	11	17	−6	5 (Note: 2 points deducted?)
8	Exodus	9	2	2	5	12	17	−5	5 (Note: 3 points deducted?)
9	Liberia United	9	1	2	6	6	18	−12	5
10	Monrovia Black Star Football Club	9	0	4	5	5	18	−13	4
