= 2015 Liberian First Division League =

LFA-Cellcom First Division
- Season: 2015
- Champions: Nimba United
- Relegated: Monrovia Club Breweries
- Matches: 14
- Goals: 47 (3.36 per match)
- Biggest home win: Keitrace FC 5–1 Aries FC (13 June 2015)
- Biggest away win: NPA Anchors 1–4 Keitrace FC (07 June 2015)
- Highest scoring: Keitrace FC 5–2 Aries FC (13 June 2015)
- Longest winning run: 2 games Keitrace FC; LISCR F.C.
- Longest unbeaten run: 3 games Watanga
- Longest winless run: 3 games I.E.
- Longest losing run: 2 games Aries FC
- All statistics correct as of 20 June 2015. Note: Walkovers counted in matches played but not counted in goals scored.

The 2015 Liberian First Division League (known as the LFA-Cellcom First Division League for sponsorship reasons) was the 42nd season of the Liberian Premier League, the Liberian professional league for association football clubs, since the league's establishment in 1956. The season began on 6 June 2015 and ended on 27 September 2015.

== Teams ==
A total of 12 teams contested the league, including 9 sides from the 2013 season and three promoted from the 2013-2014 Second Division League. The teams are split up into two groups of six teams each.

Nimba United beat LISCR FC in the final. They earned the right to compete in the 2016 CAF Champions League.

Team	Location
Barrack Young Controllers	Monrovia
Srimex FC	Monrovia
FC Fassell	Monrovia
Aries FC	Monrovia
Keitrace FC	Monrovia
LISCR FC	Monrovia
LPRC Oilers	Monrovia
Invincible Eleven	Gbarnga
Monrovia Club Breweries	Monrovia
Jubilee FC	Monrovia
Nimba United	Sanniquellie
NPA Anchors	Monrovia
Watanga FC	Monrovia
