= 2019 Liberian First Division League =

Liberian First Division League
- Season: 2019

The 2019 Liberian First Division League is the 45th season of the Liberian First Division League (formerly the Liberian Premier League), the top-tier football league in Liberia, since the league's establishment in 1956. The season started on 27 February 2019.

== Standings ==
Pos	Team	Pld	W	D	L	GF	GA	GD	Pts	Qualification or relegation
1	LPRC Oilers	22	16	6	0	47	6	+41	54	Champions
2	LISCR FC	22	15	4	3	48	16	+32	49	
3	Barrack Young Controllers	22	10	8	4	42	20	+22	38	
4	Watanga FC	22	11	5	6	26	20	+6	38	
5	Nimba United FC	22	9	6	7	35	24	+11	33	
6	Small Town FC	22	9	3	10	29	31	−2	30	
7	MC Breweries	22	7	7	8	29	29	0	28	
8	NPA Anchors FC	22	4	11	7	21	27	−6	23	
9	Nimba FC	22	6	4	12	19	34	−15	22	
10	Jubilee FC	22	4	5	13	19	38	−19	17	Relegated
11	FC Fassell	22	3	6	13	20	58	−38	15	Relegated
12	Keitrace FC	22	3	5	14	20	52	−32	14	Relegated

Source: rsssf.com
