= 2021–22 Liberian First Division =

Liberian First Division League
- Season: 2021–22
- Dates: November 3, 2021 – May 8, 2022
- Champions: Watanga (1st title)
- Relegated: MC Breweries
- Champions League: Watanga
- Confederation Cup: LISCR
- Matches: 132
- Goals: 346 (2.62 per match)
- Top goalscorer: Prince Zawoh (12 goals)
- Biggest home win: Mighty Barrolle 8–2 Sandi (November 14, 2021)
- Biggest away win: Heaven Eleven 0–5 Nimba Kwado (February 6, 2022)
- Highest scoring: Mighty Barrolle 8–2 Sandi (November 14, 2021)
- Longest winning run: Mighty Barrolle (5 matches)
- Longest unbeaten run: Freeport (9 matches)
- Longest winless run: Heaven Eleven (10 matches)
- Longest losing run: MC Breweries (4 matches)
- All statistics correct as of May 8,2022.

The 2022 LFA First Division (known as the Orange First Division for sponsorship reasons) was the 48th season of the Liberian First Division (formerly the Liberian Premier League), the top-tier football league in Liberia, since the league's establishment in 1956. The regular season began on November 3, 2021 and ended on April 17, 2022, with Watanga clinching their first ever league title.

== Team changes ==
The following teams have changed division since the 2020–21 season.

=== To National Second Division ===
Relegated from 2020–21 Liberian First Division

- NPA Anchors
- Nimba
- Small Town

=== From National Second Division ===
Promoted to 2021–22 Liberian Second Division

- Heaven Eleven (promoted as champions)
- ~~Barrack Young Controllers II~~
- Sandi

=== Purchased statuses ===
- Invincible Eleven purchased their status from Barrack Young Controllers II.

== Teams ==
=== Stadia and locations ===
Locations of the 2022 First Division teams

Note: Table lists in alphabetical order.

| Team | Location | Stadium | Capacity |
|---|---|---|---|
| Bea Mountain | Gardnersville | Tusa Field | |
| Freeport | Monrovia | Antoinette Tubman Stadium | 10,000 |
| Heaven Eleven | Yekepa | Yekepa Stadium | |
| Invincible Eleven | Gardnersville | Antoinette Tubman Stadium | 10,000 |
| LISCR | Monrovia | Antoinette Tubman Stadium | 10,000 |
| LPRC Oilers | Paynesville | Samuel Kanyon Doe Sports Complex | 22,000 |
| Mighty Barrolle | Buchanan | Doris Williams Stadium | 3,000 |
| MC Breweries | Monrovia | Antoinette Tubman Stadium | 10,000 |
| Nimba Kwado | Sanniquellie | Sanniquellie Sports Stadium | 3,000 |
| Nimba United | Mount Barclay | North Star Sports Stadium | |
| Sandi | Kakata | Nancy B Doe Sports Stadium | |
| Watanga | Paynesville | Samuel Kanyon Doe Sports Complex | 22,000 |

=== Number of teams by county ===
| Position | County | Number | Teams |
|---|---|---|---|
| 1 | Montserrado | 7 | Bea Mountain, Freeport, Invincible Eleven, LISCR, LPRC Oilers, MC Breweries and Watanga |
| 2 | Nimba | 3 | Heaven Eleven, Nimba Kwado and Nimba United |
| 3 | Grand Bassa | 1 | Mighty Barrolle |
| 3 | Margibi | 1 | Sandi |

== Standings ==
| Pos | Team | Pld | W | D | L | GF | GA | GD | Pts | Promotion or relegation |
|---|---|---|---|---|---|---|---|---|---|---|
| 1 | Watanga (C) | 22 | 13 | 3 | 6 | 37 | 17 | +20 | 42 | Qualification for Champions League first qualifying round |
| 2 | Bea Mountain | 22 | 11 | 8 | 3 | 32 | 20 | +12 | 41 | |
| 3 | LISCR | 22 | 9 | 9 | 4 | 42 | 26 | +16 | 36 | Qualification for Confederation Cup first qualifying round (Note: LISCR qualified for the Confederation Cup as the 2021–22 LFA Cup winners.) |
| 4 | Freeport | 22 | 8 | 9 | 5 | 35 | 26 | +9 | 33 | |
| 5 | Nimba Kwado | 22 | 9 | 6 | 7 | 25 | 18 | +7 | 33 | |
| 6 | Nimba United | 22 | 10 | 2 | 10 | 32 | 37 | −5 | 32 | |
| 7 | Mighty Barrolle | 22 | 7 | 10 | 5 | 31 | 34 | −3 | 31 | |
| 8 | LPRC Oilers | 22 | 8 | 5 | 9 | 31 | 27 | +4 | 29 | |
| 9 | MC Breweries (R) | 22 | 6 | 5 | 11 | 22 | 39 | −17 | 23 | Qualification to relegation play-offs |
| 10 | Invincible Eleven | 22 | 5 | 7 | 10 | 21 | 30 | −9 | 22 | Qualification to relegation play-offs |
| 11 | Heaven Eleven | 22 | 4 | 8 | 10 | 16 | 34 | −18 | 20 | Qualification to relegation play-offs |
| 12 | Sandi | 22 | 4 | 4 | 14 | 22 | 38 | −16 | 16 | Qualification to relegation play-offs |

Source: Soccerway
Rules for classification: 1) Points; 2) Head-to-head points; 3) Head-to-head goal difference; 4) Head-to-head goals scored; 5) Goal difference; 6) Goals scored.
(C) Champions; (R) Relegated

== Results ==
| Home \ Away | BEA | FRE | HEA | INV | LIS | LOI | MIG | MCB | NKW | NUN | SAN | WAT |
|---|---|---|---|---|---|---|---|---|---|---|---|---|
| Bea Mountain | | 2–1 | 1–0 | 2–2 | 2–1 | 0–0 | 2–2 | 1–1 | 0–0 | 0–1 | 2–1 | 0–2 |
| Freeport | 1–1 | | 5–1 | 1–1 | 3–3 | 1–1 | 1–0 | 2–0 | 3–2 | 3–1 | 0–0 | 0–2 |
| Heaven Eleven | 0–0 | 0–0 | | 1–1 | 0–2 | 1–0 | 1–1 | 2–2 | 0–5 | 0–2 | 1–1 | 1–0 |
| Invincible Eleven | 0–3 | 0–1 | 0–1 | | 0–0 | 0–2 | 2–3 | 3–0 | 2–1 | 3–2 | 3–2 | 0–0 |
| LISCR | 2–0 | 1–1 | 2–2 | 1–0 | | 5–1 | 2–2 | 1–1 | 1–2 | 2–3 | 8–2 | 2–1 |
| LPRC Oilers | 0–1 | 4–2 | 3–1 | 0–2 | 0–0 | | 0–0 | 4–1 | 1–0 | 2–3 | 3–0 | 2–2 |
| Mighty Barrolle | 1–4 | 2–2 | 2–1 | 1–1 | 2–2 | 2–0 | | 2–0 | 1–1 | 1–1 | 2–0 | 0–3 |
| MC Breweries | 2–2 | 0–1 | 2–1 | 1–0 | 2–1 | 0–6 | 3–0 | | 2–1 | 3–1 | 1–2 | 0–3 |
| Nimba Kwado | 1–2 | 1–0 | 0–0 | 2–0 | 0–1 | 1–0 | 2–2 | 0–0 | | 0–2 | 1–0 | 0–0 |
| Nimba United | 1–2 | 1–5 | 1–2 | 1–1 | 0–2 | 2–1 | 1–2 | 2–1 | 0–1 | | 2–1 | 2–1 |
| Sandi | 0–2 | 0–0 | 3–0 | 2–0 | 2–2 | 1–2 | 1–2 | 1–0 | 1–2 | 1–2 | | 1–2 |
| Watanga | 1–3 | 3–2 | 1–0 | 3–0 | 0–1 | 1–0 | 4–1 | 3–0 | 0–2 | 4–0 | 1–0 | |

Updated to match(es) played on April 17, 2022. Source: Soccerway
Legend: Blue = home team win; Yellow = draw; Red = away team win.

== Relegation play-offs ==
The relegation play-offs took place between April 28 to May 8, 2022.

=== First round ===
| Team 1 | Agg. | Team 2 | 1st leg | 2nd leg |
|---|---|---|---|---|
| MC Breweries | 3–4 | Invincible Eleven | 0–2 | 3–2 |

Invincible Eleven won 4–3 on aggregate, stay in First Division

=== Final round ===
| Pos | Team | Pld | W | D | L | GF | GA | GD | Pts | Promotion or relegation |
|---|---|---|---|---|---|---|---|---|---|---|
| 1 | Heaven Eleven | 2 | 1 | 1 | 0 | 3 | 2 | +1 | 4 | |
| 2 | Sandi | 2 | 1 | 0 | 1 | 6 | 6 | 0 | 3 | |
| 3 | MC Breweries (R) | 2 | 0 | 1 | 1 | 3 | 4 | −1 | 1 | Relegation to Second Division |

Updated to match(es) played on May 8, 2022. Source: Soccerway
Rules for classification: 1) Points; 2) Head-to-head points; 3) Head-to-head goal difference; 4) Head-to-head goals scored; 5) Goal difference; 6) Goals scored.
(R) Relegated

MCBreweries is relegated to Second Division

== Statistics ==
=== Top goalscorers ===
As of April 10, 2022

| Rank | Player | Club | Goals |
|---|---|---|---|
| 1 | Prince Zawoh | Nimba United | 12 |
| 2 | Varney Dukuly | Mighty Barrolle | 11 |
| 2 | Sidiki Kromah | Invincible Eleven | 11 |
| 4 | Patrick Dueh | Freeport | 10 |
| 5 | Gibson Freeman | Freeport | 9 |
