= 2002 Liberian Premier League =

Association football season in Liberia

There were sixteen teams who competed in the Liberian Premier League in 2002. Liberia Petroleum Refining Company Oilers from Monrovia won the championship.

== Group stage ==
=== Group A ===
| Pos | Team | Pld | W | D | L | GF | GA | GD | Pts |
|---|---|---|---|---|---|---|---|---|---|
| 1 | Mighty Barrolle | 14 | 9 | 2 | 3 | 29 | 18 | +11 | 29 |
| 2 | Mark Professionals | 13 | 5 | 7 | 1 | 22 | 15 | +7 | 22 |
| 3 | Alliance FC | 13 | 5 | 5 | 3 | 26 | 20 | +6 | 20 |
| 4 | BUSA | 11 | 5 | 2 | 4 | 18 | 28 | −10 | 17 |
| 5 | National Port Authority Anchors | 11 | 3 | 4 | 4 | 21 | 15 | +6 | 13 |
| 6 | Olympic FC | 12 | 2 | 6 | 4 | 18 | 19 | −1 | 12 |
| 7 | Bassa Defenders | 11 | 3 | 2 | 6 | 5 | 11 | −6 | 11 |
| 8 | Young Survivors | 11 | 0 | 3 | 8 | 5 | 18 | −13 | 8 (Note: 1 more loss than win and odd number of draws: record of Young Survivors has errors?) |

=== Group B ===
| Pos | Team | Pld | W | D | L | GF | GA | GD | Pts |
|---|---|---|---|---|---|---|---|---|---|
| 1 | Invincible Eleven | 13 | 10 | 2 | 1 | 16 | 4 | +12 | 32 |
| 2 | Liberia Petroleum Refining Company Oilers | 13 | 6 | 5 | 2 | 16 | 11 | +5 | 23 |
| 3 | Liberia Ship Corporate Registry Football Club | 12 | 5 | 5 | 2 | 21 | 10 | +11 | 20 |
| 4 | Monrovia Club Breweries | 11 | 6 | 1 | 4 | 17 | 11 | +6 | 19 |
| 5 | St Anthony FC | 11 | 5 | 1 | 5 | 18 | 15 | +3 | 16 |
| 6 | ROZA | 12 | 3 | 3 | 6 | 11 | 14 | −3 | 12 |
| 7 | Monrovia Black Star Football Club | 12 | 3 | 1 | 8 | 8 | 19 | −11 | 10 |
| 8 | Defence Invaders | 12 | 0 | 2 | 10 | 4 | 27 | −23 | 2 |

== Final ==
Top 4 clubs only

| Pos | Team | Pld | Pts |
|---|---|---|---|
| 1 | Liberia Petroleum Refining Company Oilers | 7 | 15 |
| 2 | Liberia Ship Corporate Registry Football Club | 7 | 14 |
| 3 | Monrovia Club Breweries | 7 | 12 |
| 4 | Mighty Barrolle | 7 | 9 |
