= 1992 Liberian Premier League =

Association football season in Liberia

There were sixteen teams who competed in the Liberian Premier League in 1992. LPRC Oilers from Monrovia won the championship.

== Group stage ==
=== Group A ===
Pos	Team	Pld	W	D	L	GF	GA	GD	Pts
1	Monrovia Black Star Football Club	4	3	0	1	7	5	+2	9
2	Liberia Petroleum Refining Company Oilers	4	2	1	1	8	3	+5	7
3	Bame	4	0	1	3	2	9	−7	1
4	Young Eagles (W)	0	0	0	0	0	0	0	0

(W) ?

=== Group B ===
Pos	Team	Pld	W	D	L	GF	GA	GD	Pts
1	Invincible Eleven	6	5	1	0	10	0	+10	16
2	FDA Foresters	6	2	2	2	4	4	0	8
3	Lamco Enforcers	6	1	1	4	6	10	−4	4
4	Baccus Marine	6	0	4	2	3	9	−6	4

=== Group C ===
Pos	Team	Pld	W	D	L	GF	GA	GD	Pts
1	Saint Joseph Warriors FC	6	4	2	0	11	4	+7	14
2	Fulani FC	6	2	2	2	8	5	+3	8
3	Defence Invaders	6	2	2	2	6	10	−4	8
4	Cedar United	6	1	0	5	4	10	−6	3

=== Group D ===
Pos	Team	Pld	W	D	L	GF	GA	GD	Pts
1	National Port Authority Anchors	4	1	3	0	3	2	+1	6
2	Mighty Barrolle	4	1	2	1	6	4	+2	5
3	LPMC Planters	4	1	1	2	2	5	−3	4
4	Sparrow (W)	0	0	0	0	0	0	0	0

(W) ?

== Final ==
Pos	Team	Pld	W	D	L	GF	GA	GD	Pts
1	Liberia Petroleum Refining Company Oilers	7	3	3	1	7	4	+3	12
2	FDA Foresters	7	2	5	0	10	6	+4	11
3	Invincible Eleven	7	2	4	1	11	6	+5	10
4	National Port Authority Anchors	7	2	3	2	5	5	0	9
5	Mighty Barrolle	7	1	5	1	8	9	−1	8
6	Monrovia Black Star Football Club	7	1	4	2	7	9	−2	7
7	Saint Joseph Warriors FC	7	1	4	2	6	10	−4	7
8	Fulani FC	7	1	2	4	5	10	−5	5
