= 2006 Liberian Premier League =

Association football season in Liberia

There were nine teams who competed in the Liberian Premier League in 2006. Mighty Barrolle from Monrovia won the championship.

== League standings ==
Pos	Team	Pld	W	D	L	GF	GA	GD	Pts
1	Mighty Barrolle	16	9	4	3	31	16	+15	31
2	Monrovia Black Star Football Club	16	7	5	4	21	20	+1	26
3	Liberia Ship Corporate Registry Football Club	15	7	4	4	18	10	+8	25
4	National Port Authority Anchors	16	5	9	2	22	16	+6	24
5	Liberia Petroleum Refining Company Oilers	16	6	6	4	13	9	+4	24
6	Monrovia Club Breweries	16	6	5	5	21	16	+5	23
7	Watanga FC	16	5	5	6	11	13	−2	20
8	UMC Roots FC	15	2	6	7	11	24	−13	12
9	Mark Professionals	16	1	3	12	6	25	−19	6
