= 1993 Liberian Premier League =

Association football season in Liberia

There were fifteen teams who competed in the Liberian Premier League in 1993. Mighty Barrolle from Monrovia won the championship.

== League standings ==
Pos	Team	Pld	W	D	L	GF	GA	GD	Pts
1	Mighty Barrolle	14	12	0	2	23	6	+17	36
2	Fulani FC	14	8	4	2	22	13	+9	28
3	Invincible Eleven	14	8	3	3	28	14	+14	27
4	Saint Joseph Warriors FC	14	8	2	4	22	17	+5	26
5	National Port Authority Anchors	14	6	5	3	28	20	+8	23
6	Monrovia Black Star Football Club	14	6	5	3	18	13	+5	23
7	Dekontee Star	14	7	2	5	15	11	+4	23
8	Liberia Petroleum Refining Company Oilers	14	6	3	5	16	15	+1	21
9	Baccus Marine	14	5	4	5	21	19	+2	19
10	Bame	14	5	2	7	20	22	−2	17
11	LEC Current	14	5	2	7	18	22	−4	17
12	MSG Kalum	14	5	1	8	17	21	−4	16
13	Lamco Enforcers	14	4	3	7	13	24	−11	15
14	FDA Foresters	14	4	0	10	10	18	−8	12
15	Sparrow	14	2	1	11	14	50	−36	7
