= Jeremy Saygbe =

Liberian footballer

Personal information
- Full name: Jeremy Gift Saygbe
- Date of birth: 1 June 2001 (age 25)
- Place of birth: Monrovia, Liberia
- Height: 1.74 m (5 ft 9 in)
- Positions: Right-back; center-back

Team information
- Current team: LISCR FC

Senior career*
Years	Team	Apps	(Gls)
2016–2017	Fassell		
2018–2019	Barrack Young Controllers		
2019–	LISCR FC		
2021–2022	→ Linense (loan)	1	(0)

International career^{‡}
2018–	Liberia	12	(0)
- * Club domestic league appearances and goals ‡ National team caps and goals as of 20:09, 13 September 2023 (UTC)

Jeremy Gift Saygbe (born 1 June 2001) is a Liberian professional footballer who plays as a right-back and center-back for Liberian First Division club LISCR FC and the Liberia national team.

== Honors ==
Barrack Young Controllers

- Liberian First Division: 2018
- Liberian FA Cup: 2018; runner-up: 2019
