= 1989 Liberian Premier League =

Association football season in Liberia

There were sixteen teams who competed in the Liberian Premier League in 1989. Mighty Barrolle from Monrovia won the championship.

== League standings ==
Pos	Team	Pld	Pts
1	Mighty Barrolle	15	23
2	Invincible Eleven	15	23
3	Liberia Petroleum Refining Company Oilers	15	18
4	National Port Authority Anchors	15	17
5	Saint Joseph Warriors	15	17
6	Fulani FC	15	17
7	Bame	15	15
8	Lamco Enforcers	15	15
9	Cedar United	15	15
10	Monrovia Black Star Football Club	15	14
11	Defence Invaders	15	13
12	Sinkor United	15	12
13	Young Survivors	15	12
14	Sparrow	15	10
15	Young Eagles	15	9
16	Liverpool	15	8
