= 2003 Liberian Premier League =

Association football season in Liberia

There were eight teams who competed in the Liberian Premier League in 2003. No championship was held due to the Second Liberian Civil War.

== League standings ==
Pos	Team	Pld	W	D	L	GF	GA	GD	Pts
1	Liberia Petroleum Refining Company Oilers	3	2	1	0	6	3	+3	7
2	Mighty Barrolle	3	2	1	0	4	1	+3	7
3	Monrovia Club Breweries	3	2	0	1	4	3	+1	6
4	Liberia Ship Corporate Registry Football Club	3	1	1	1	5	3	+2	4
5	Invincible Eleven	3	1	1	1	5	6	−1	4
6	Alliance FC	3	1	0	2	2	5	−3	3
7	BUSA	3	0	2	1	4	6	−2	2
8	Mark Professionals	3	0	0	3	2	5	−3	0
