= Abdulai Koulibaly =

Liberian footballer (born 1995)

Personal information
- Date of birth: 1 January 1995 (age 31)
- Place of birth: Monrovia, Liberia
- Position: Goalkeeper

Team information
- Current team: Barrack Young Controllers FC

Youth career
- 2008–2009: Mighty Rangers
- 2009: Monrovia Club Breweries

Senior career*
Years	Team	Apps	(Gls)
2009–2015	Monrovia Club Breweries		
2015	Champasak United F.C.		
2015–2017	Monrovia Club Breweries		
2017–	Barrack Young Controllers FC		

International career^{‡}
2014	Liberia U20		
2017–	Liberia	11	(0)
- * Club domestic league appearances and goals ‡ National team caps and goals as of 17 November 2024

Abdulai Koulibaly (born 1 January 1995) is a Liberian footballer who plays for Barrack Young Controllers FC of the Liberian Premier League as of 2017.

== Career ==
Part of the 25-man congregation that travelled to Laos in 2015 to play for Champasak United in their local league, Koulibaly moved to Barrack Young Controllers in his native Liberia in 2017, making his national team debut against Mauritania.

During his last season at Breweries, the Liberian goalkeeper tallied 5 goals in 3 appearances, including a hat-trick facing Keitrace FC.

== Career statistics ==
=== International ===
As of match played 17 November 2024

Appearances and goals by national team and year
National team	Year	Apps	Goals
Liberia	2017	1	0
Liberia	2024	10	0
Total		11	0

== Honors ==
Monrovia Club Breweries

- Liberian Second Division League: 2016
- Liberian Cup: 2016
- Liberian Super Cup: 2016

== Awards ==
- Best Goalkeeper (Liberian Second Division)
