= Liberian Super Cup =

Liberian football competition

The Liberian Super Cup is a pre-season football competition held the week before the season begins in Liberia every year, in April. It is contested by the winners of the National Premier League and the Liberian Cup in the previous season, as a curtain raiser to the new season. It is played at the Antoinette Tubman Stadium.

== Winners ==
Year	Winner	Score	Runner-up	Source
2002	LPRC	1–0	MB Angels	
2004	LISCR	1–0	Mighty Barolle	
2007	NPA Anchors	1–1 (5–3 pen.)	Mighty Barolle	
2009	Black Star (automatically because wins National Premier League and the Liberian Cup)			
2010	BYC	1–0	Mighty Barolle	
2011	LISCR	2–1	IE	
2012	LISCR	2–1	BYC II	
2013	BYC (automatically because wins National Premier League and the Liberian Cup)			
2014	BYC	2–1	FC Fassell	
2015	BYC II	1–1 (5–4 pen.)	Nimba United	
2016	Monrovia Breweries FC	0–0 (3–2 pen.)	BYC FC (Monrovia)	
2018	LISCR FC	3–0	Srimex FC	
2019	BYC	2–1	LISCR FC	

== See also ==
- Liberia national football team
