= Varney Sando =

Liberian footballer (born 1995)

Personal information
- Full name: Varney Boakai Sando Jr.
- Date of birth: 5 May 1995 (age 31)
- Place of birth: Monrovia, Liberia
- Height: 1.80 m (5 ft 11 in)
- Position: Midfielder

Team information
- Current team: Accra Great Olympics
- Number: 25

Senior career*
Years	Team	Apps	(Gls)
2010–2014	Sime Darby FC		
2015	Wassaman United		
2016	FC Tanga		
2017–2019	LISCR FC		
2019–2020	LPRC Oilers		
2020–2022	Karela United		
2022–	Accra Great Olympics		
2023	→ Watanga FC (loan)		

International career
2019	Liberia	1	(0)
- * Club domestic league appearances and goals

Varney Boakai Sando Jr. (born 5 May 1995) is a Liberian professional footballer who plays as a midfielder for Ghana Premier League club Accra Great Olympics. He made one appearance for the Liberia national team in 2019.

== Club career ==
In 2020, Sando signed for Ghanaian club Karela United. It was reported in July 2021 that he wanted to terminate his contract with the club. In January 2022, he signed for another club in Ghana, Accra Great Olympics.

== International career ==
Sando made his first appearance for the Liberia national team in a 1–0 friendly loss to Egypt on 7 November 2019.

== Honors ==
LISCR FC

- Liberian First Division: 2016–17
- Liberian FA Cup: 2019
