= 2005 Liberian Premier League =

Association football season in Liberia

There were eight teams who competed in the Liberian Premier League in 2005. Liberia Petroleum Refining Company Oilers from Monrovia won the championship.

== League standings ==
Pos	Team	Pld	W	D	L	Pts
1	Liberia Petroleum Refining Company Oilers	14	8	5	1	29
2	National Port Authority Anchors	14	7	3	4	24
3	UMC Roots FC	14	5	4	5	19
4	Mighty Barrolle	14	5	3	6	18
5	Monrovia Club Breweries	14	5	3	6	18
6	Liberia Ship Corporate Registry Football Club	14	5	3	6	18
7	Invincible Eleven	14	4	5	5	17
8	Alliance FC	14	3	2	9	11
