= James Koko Lomell =

Liberian footballer

James Lomell
Personal information
- Full name: James Koko Lomell
- Date of birth: 16 October 1985 (age 41)
- Place of birth: Monrovia, Liberia
- Height: 1.76 m (5 ft 9 in)
- Positions: Midfielder; forward

Senior career*
Years	Team	Apps	(Gls)
1998−1999	Haja	2	(1)
2000−2002	Junior Professional	3	(0)
2002−2004	Maritzburg City	55	(6)
2004−2005	Manning Rangers	22	(0)
2005	Sekondi Hasaacas	9	(7)
2005	LPRC Oilers	17	(7)
2005−2006	Mabopane Young Masters	22	(10)
2006−2007	FC AK	19	(8)
2007−2008	PSMS Medan	32	(19)
2008	LPRC Oilers		
2009	Pelita Jaya	13	(2)
2009−2010	Hapoel Petah Tikva	5	(0)
2010−2011	LISCR FC	16	(8)
2011	Gresik United	15	(4)
2012	Deltras	16	(3)
2013	Persija Jakarta	33	(17)
2014	PS Barito Putera	20	(9)
2015	Persiram Raja Ampat	2	(0)
2016	Persipura Jayapura	5	(1)

International career
2005−2012	Liberia	18	(2)
- * Club domestic league appearances and goals

James Koko Lomell (born 16 October 1985) is a Liberian former footballer.

== Club career ==
In Summer 2008 was on trial with team in Europe Ankaraspor but his management refused the offered contract. Lomell played for PSMS Medan and Pelita Jaya in Indonesia.

In January 2015, he was reported to have signed with Persiram.

== International career ==
He is also a member of the Liberia national football team.

== Honors ==
LPRC Oilers

- Liberian Premier League: 2005

PSMS Medan

- Liga Indonesia Premier Division runner up: 2007–08

LISCR FC

- Liberian Premier League: 2010−11
