= 2004 Liberian Premier League =

Association football season in Liberia

There were seven teams who competed in the Liberian Premier League in 2004. Mighty Barrolle from Monrovia won the championship.

== League standings ==
Pos	Team	Pld	W	D	L	GF	GA	GD	Pts
1	Mighty Barrolle	11	9	0	2	19	10	+9	27
2	Invincible Eleven	10	6	2	2	10	5	+5	20
3	Liberia Petroleum Refining Company Oilers	9	4	2	3	8	6	+2	14
4	Liberia Ship Corporate Registry Football Club	10	3	3	4	14	7	+7	12
5	Monrovia Club Breweries	9	3	1	5	9	14	−5	10
6	Alliance FC	8	2	2	4	6	7	−1	8
7	Shoes	9	0	2	7	4	18	−14	2
