= 2018 Liberian First Division League =

Liberian First Division League
- Season: 2018
- Champions: Barrack Young Controllers

The 2018 Liberian First Division League is the 44th season of the Liberian Premier League, the Liberian professional league for association football clubs, since the league's establishment in 1956.

After much delay, the season started on 27 August 2018. A total of 12 teams will participate, and they will be divided into two groups of six teams.

== Group stage ==
=== Group A ===
Pos	Team	Pld	W	D	L	GF	GA	GD	Pts
1	Barrack Young Controllers (Q)	8	5	2	1	21	5	+16	17
2	Watanga FC	8	4	2	2	11	15	−4	14
3	Jubilee FC	8	3	2	3	6	7	−1	11
4	MC Breweries	8	2	3	3	8	10	−2	9
5	Small Town FC (R)	8	1	1	6	7	16	−9	4

Updated to match(es) played on unknown. Source:
(Q) Qualified for the phase indicated; (R) Relegated

=== Group B ===
Pos	Team	Pld	W	D	L	GF	GA	GD	Pts
1	LPRC Oilers (Q)	8	5	2	1	12	5	+7	17
2	Nimba United	8	4	3	1	7	3	+4	15
3	LISCR	8	3	3	2	10	9	+1	12
4	NPA Anchors FC	8	1	2	5	6	11	−5	5
5	Keitrace FC (R)	8	0	4	4	4	11	−7	4

Updated to match(es) played on unknown. Source:
(Q) Qualified for the phase indicated; (R) Relegated

== Final ==
[Oct 17, Antoinette Tubman Stadium, Monrovia]

Barrack Young Controllers 2-2 LPRC Oilers [aet, 4-2 pen]

== See also ==
- 2018 Liberian FA Cup
