= Ashley Williams (Liberian footballer) =

Liberian footballer (born 2000)

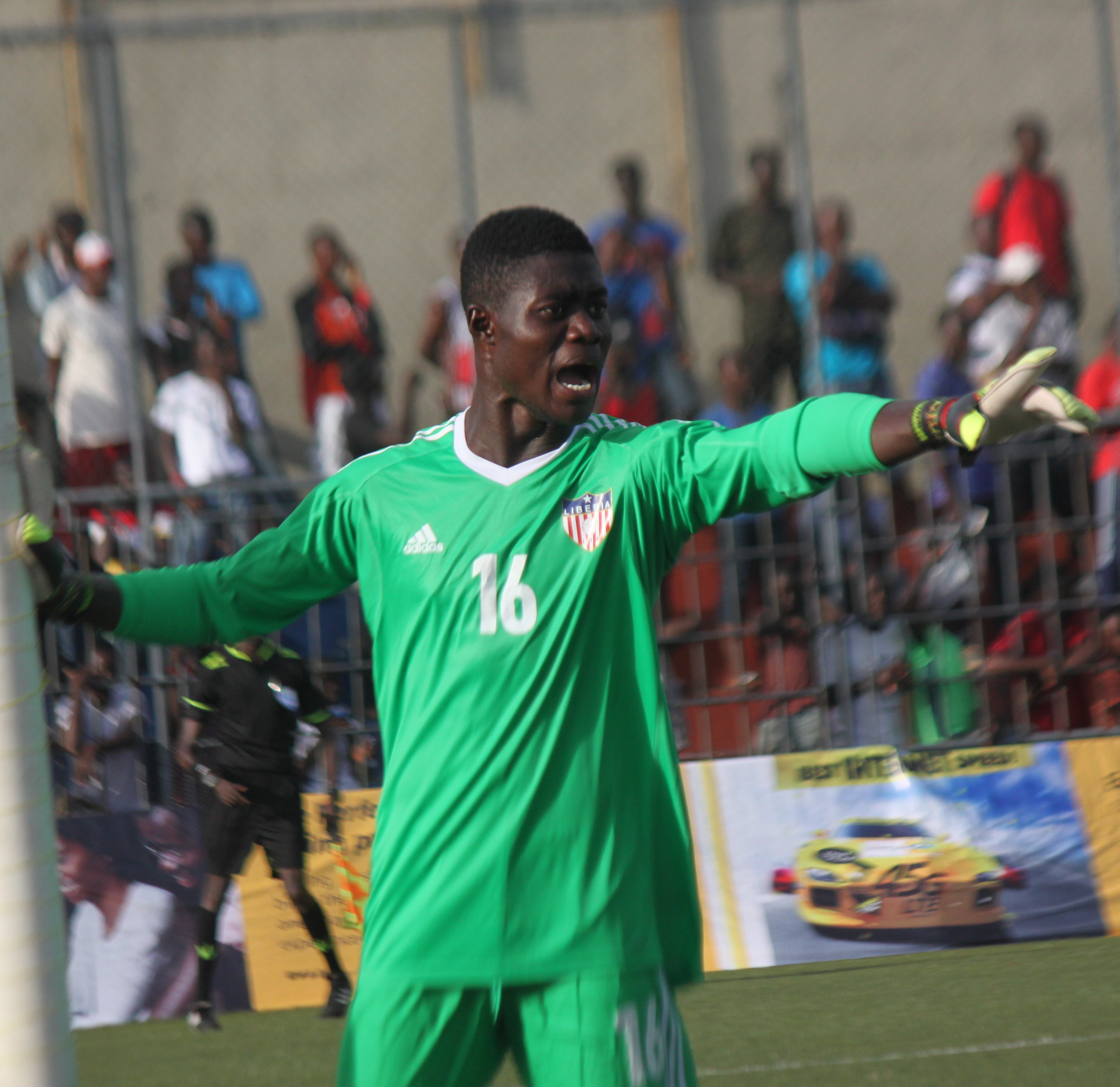
- Williams with Liberia Under-20 at the 2018 WAFU U-20 Cup

Personal information
- Full name: Ashley Williams
- Date of birth: 30 October 2000 (age 26)
- Place of birth: Montserrado County, Liberia
- Height: 5 ft 9 in (1.75 m)
- Position: Goalkeeper

Team information
- Current team: LISCR FC
- Number: 1

Youth career
- 2012–2014: Duke Football Club
- 2014–2015: Bassa Town Young Controllers
- 2015–2017: Gardnersville Football Club

Senior career*
Years	Team	Apps	(Gls)
2017–	LISCR FC		
2020–2021	→ Linense (loan)	1	(0)

International career^{‡}
2018	Liberia U20	4	(0)
2018–	Liberia	17	(0)
- * Club domestic league appearances and goals ‡ National team caps and goals as of 29 September 2026 (UTC)

Ashley Williams (born 30 October 2000) is a Liberian footballer who plays as a goalkeeper for Liberian side LISCR FC and the Liberian national team.

== Early career ==
Born in Monrovia, Williams started playing football in his local community of Logan Town where he started playing as a defender. The young potential kid began his career at age 12 when he joined a local community team, Duke Football Club. He played at the left-back position with the community club before joining another community youth club, Bassa Town Young Controller. He joined the club in 2014 and switch his position from playing at left-back to the goalkeeping position because of the club lack of goalkeeper. The decision to go in goal worked out for the 14-year-old who performed excellently. He remained as a goalkeeper and led the club to playing in the third division league where he was spotted by Liberia First Division club LISCR FC that showed interest in signing him for their feeder team, Gardnersville FC, that played in the second division of Liberian football.

=== Gardnersville FC ===
LISCR succeeded in signing the left-back turned goalkeeper in 2015 and sent him to Gardnersville FC for development. The young goalkeeper was immediately given a place in the team upon his arrival after first choice goalkeeper Gabriel Okotie was promoted to LISCR. During his debut season in the second division, he managed to put out some brilliant performances which caught the attention of LISCR FC head coach, Tapha Manneh who invited him to train with LISCR FC during the first phase break of the 2016–17 Liberian First Division League. After more than two weeks of intensive training sessions, Williams performances pleased Tapha Manneh who awarded him a place in the team, taking part in the second half of the unbeaten season.

=== LISCR FC ===
After several years with Gardnerville, he moved permanently from the third division to the top tier of Liberian football. Two months after his promotion to LISCR, he made his debut in the Liberian Cup second round against Muscat FC. He played all 90 minutes as LISCR and Muscat FC played to a 4–4 draw, sending LISCR on to the third round with a 7–3 aggregate.

Ahead of the 2018 Liberian First Division season, he featured in two matches and played a key role in helping his side win the 2017 LISCR Trust Tournament and Liberia Diaspora Tournament. He did not feature for LISCR in the 2018 CAF Champions League, however.

== International career ==
Williams might not have had the opportunity to play a competitive game for LISCR, but his performances during the preseason never went unnoticed by Liberia under-20 head coach, Christopher Wreh who called him to the team's training sessions ahead of the 2018 WAFU/FOX U-20 Tournament. He made the list of the provisional 25-players before making the final 18-man team for the tournament. He made his debut for the Liberia under-20 squad on the opening day of the tournament in a 3–0 loss to Ivory Coast in which he made eight saves. Despite the defeat, he helped Liberia bounce back to defeat Guinea 2–1 in the following match. Liberia progressed out of the group stage into the semifinals with a 5–1 win over the Sierra Leone. On 2 May, Williams kept a clean-sheet as Liberia beat Mali to reach the final of the tournament, eventually losing to The Gambia in the final.

== Career statistics ==
=== International ===
As of match played 29 September 2026

Appearances and goals by national team and year
National team	Year	Apps	Goals
Liberia	2018	2	0
Liberia	2019	6	0
Liberia	2021	3	0
Liberia	2023	3	0
Liberia	2026	3	0
Total		17	0

== Honors ==
=== Club ===
LISCR FC

- Liberian Premier League: 2016–17
- FA Cup/Petro Trade Cup: 2016–17, 2021–22, 2022–23
- FA Super Cup: 2022
