= Melvin Boban George =

Liberian footballer (born 1990)

Personal information
- Date of birth: 5 November 1990 (age 36)
- Place of birth: Monrovia, Liberia
- Height: 1.88 m (6 ft 2 in)
- Position: Midfielder

Senior career*
Years	Team	Apps	(Gls)
2007–2009	National Port Authority Anchors		
2010–2011	Mighty Barrolle		
2012	LISCR FC		
2013–2014	Nimba United Football Club		
2015–2016	Hanthawaddy United F.C.		
2018	Monrovia Club Breweries		
2018	Watanga FC		

International career
2016	Liberia	1	(0)
- * Club domestic league appearances and goals

Melvin Boban George (born 5 November 1990) is a Liberian former professional footballer who played as a midfielder.

== International career ==
In March and May 2016, George was invited to join the Liberia national team in their AFCON Qualification matches. He was part of the 19 foreign players called up by coach Debbah.
