= Christopher Jackson (footballer) =

Liberian footballer (born 1996)

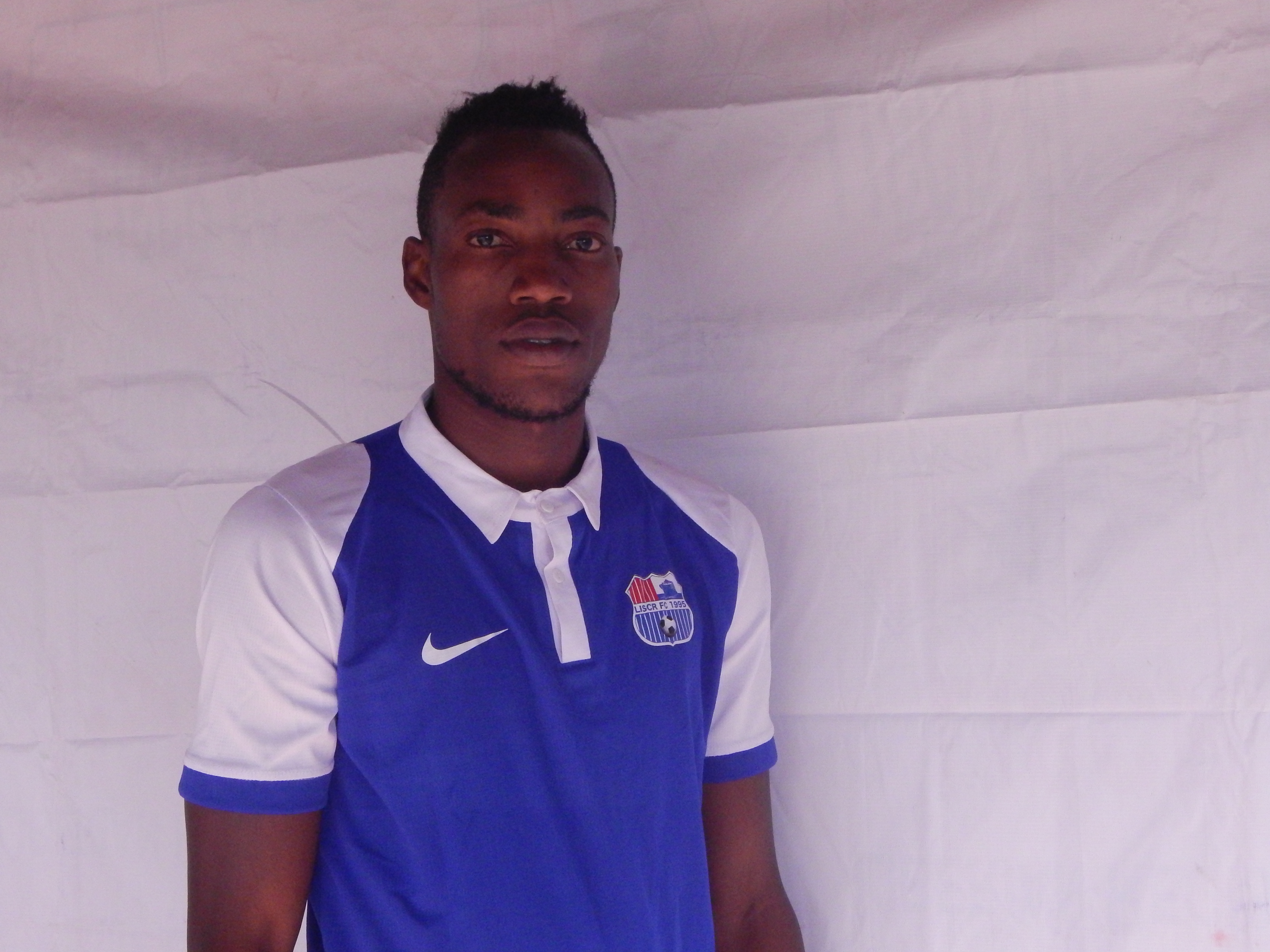

Personal information
- Full name: Christopher Jackson
- Date of birth: 25 October 1996 (age 30)
- Place of birth: Montserrado County, Liberia
- Height: 6 ft 2 in (1.88 m)
- Position: Forward

Team information
- Current team: LISCR
- Number: 17

Youth career
- 2010–2011: Shooting Stars
- 2011–2013: Manchester City (Liberia)

Senior career*
Years	Team	Apps	(Gls)
2013–2014	Keitrace	19	(10)
2014–2017	LISCR	60	(31)
2018	Shakhtyor Soligorsk	2	(0)
2019–	LISCR	16+	(19+)

International career^{‡}
2017–	Liberia	9	(3)
- * Club domestic league appearances and goals as of 1 January 2020 ‡ National team caps and goals as of 1 January 2020

Christopher Jackson (born 25 October 1996) is a Liberian footballer who plays as a forward for LISCR.

== Club career ==
=== Early career ===
Born in Montserrado County, Jackson started his playing career at community based fourth division club, Shooting Stars Football Club. After a year with Shooting Stars, Jackson signed with Montserrado County-based third division club Manchester City, which is named after Premier League club. The young striker spent two years with Manchester City in the Liberia Third Division League.

=== Keitrace FC ===
In 2013, Christopher Jackson signed a three-year deal with second division side, Keitrace FC. His ten goals in 19 appearances helped Keitrace FC gain promotion to the top tier of Liberian football, the First Division.

=== LISCR FC ===
After a year with Keitrace, Jackson made a move to Liberian Premier League club LISCR FC. Jackson went on to score ten goals in 18 appearances in his first season. He led the team to the final of the 2015 Liberian First Division League season, where LISCR FC lost to Nimba United Football Club on penalty shootouts. The following season, Jackson managed to score eight times from 17 appearances as LISCR FC struggled under new coach, Robert Lartey. Under the guidance of the Gambian coach Tapha Manneh, Jackson won his first league title, playing a key role in club's of longest unbeaten run in Liberian football. Jackson scored 13 goals in 25 appearances to help LISCR FC finish the 2016-17 league season unbeaten and also winning the Liberian Cup to complete the double.

=== Shakhtyor Soligorsk ===
In early 2018, Jackson left LISCR FC and traveled to Belarus to attend tryouts with Belarusian Premier League club Shakhtyor Soligorsk. In February, LISCR FC announced that they agreed a deal with FC Shakhtyor Soligorsk for a free transfer of Jackson.

=== International goals ===
Scores and results list Liberia's goal tally first.

No.	Date	Venue	Opponent	Score	Result	Competition
1.	5 June 2017	Antoinette Tubman Stadium, Monrovia, Liberia	Sierra Leone	1–0	1–0	Friendly
2.	23 July 2017	Stade Municipal Zouérate, Zouérat, Mauritania	Mauritania	1–0	1–0	2018 African Nations Championship qualification
3.	28 July 2019	Antoinette Tubman Stadium, Monrovia, Liberia	Senegal	1–0	1–0	2020 African Nations Championship qualification

== Honors ==
=== Club ===
LISCR FC

Winner

- Liberia First Division: 2016–17
- Liberian Cup: 2016–17
