= Carlos Williams (footballer) =

Liberian footballer (born 1990)

Personal information
- Full name: Carlos Kefa Williams
- Date of birth: 26 June 1990 (age 36)
- Place of birth: Monrovia, Liberia
- Height: 1.72 m (5 ft 8 in)
- Position: Left-back

Team information
- Current team: Watanga

Senior career*
| Years | Team | Apps | (Gls) |
| 2015 | Monrovia Club Breweries | | |
| 2016–2018 | Watanga | | |

International career
| 2016 | Liberia | 1 | (0) |
- * Club domestic league appearances and goals

Carlos Kefa Williams (born 26 June 1990) is a Liberian former professional footballer who last played as a left-back for Liberian First Division club Watanga. He made one appearance for the Liberia national team in 2016.
