= 2010–11 Liberian Premier League =

Association football season in Liberia

There were twenty teams who competed in the Liberian Premier League in the 2010–11 season. LISCR FC from Monrovia won the championship. They defeated the Invincible Eleven with a score of 4–1.
