= Augustine Otu =

Liberian footballer

Personal information
- Date of birth: 8 April 1998 (age 28)
- Position: Forward

Team information
- Current team: Tersana SC
- Number: 9

Senior career*
Years	Team	Apps	(Gls)
2015	Nimba United		
2016–2017	ELWA United		
2018–2020	LPRC Oilers		
2020	Wazito		
2020–2021	Watanga FC		
2021–2022	Al-Merrikh SC		
2022–2023	Al-Mustagbal SC		
2023–	Tersana SC		

International career^{‡}
2019–	Liberia	4	(0)
- * Club domestic league appearances and goals ‡ National team caps and goals as of 24 March 2025

Augustine Otu (born 8 April 1998) is a Liberian professional footballer who plays as a striker for Tersana SC.

== Career statistics ==
=== International ===
As of match played 24 March 2025

Appearances and goals by national team and year
National team	Year	Apps	Goals
Liberia	2019	2	0
Liberia	2025	2	0
Total		4	0
