= Fallah Johnson =

Liberian footballer

Personal information
- Full name: Fallah Johnson
- Date of birth: October 26, 1976 (age 50)
- Place of birth: Liberia
- Position: Center-back

Senior career*
Years	Team	Apps	(Gls)
1995–1998	Mighty Barolle		
1999	LPRC Oilers		
2000	Black Star		
2000	LPRC Oilers		
2001	Mighty Barolle		
2002–2007	Persita Tangerang		
2007–2008	Persik Kediri	19	(0)
2010–2011	Persikab Bandung		

International career
1994–2004	Liberia	36	(0)
- * Club domestic league appearances and goals as of 00:04, 29 October 2014 (UTC)

Fallah Johnson (born October 26, 1976, in Monrovia) is a Liberian former footballer and former member of the Liberia national football team.
