= Alex Nimely =

Liberian footballer (born 1991)

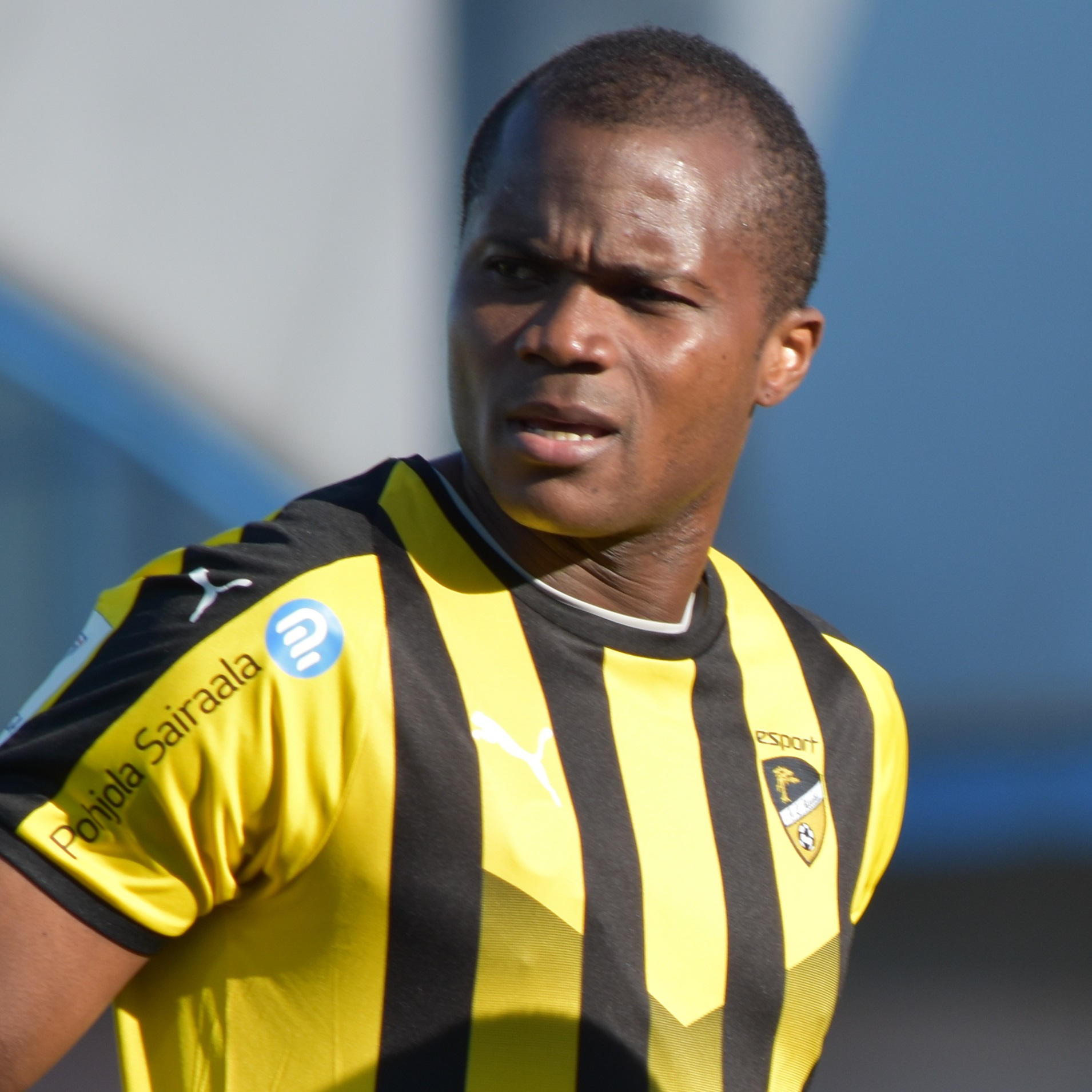
- Alex Nimely playing for FC Honka in 2018

Personal information
- Full name: Alex Tchuimeni-Nimely
- Date of birth: 11 May 1991 (age 35)
- Place of birth: Monrovia, Liberia
- Height: 1.80 m (5 ft 11 in)
- Position: Forward

Youth career
- 2003–2005: Barrack Y.C
- 2005–2006: Mighty Barrolle

Senior career*
Years	Team	Apps	(Gls)
2006–2008	Coton de Garoua	9	(5)
2008–2014	Manchester City	1	(0)
2011	→ Middlesbrough (loan)	9	(0)
2012	→ Coventry City (loan)	17	(1)
2013	→ Crystal Palace (loan)	2	(0)
2014–2015	Port Vale	1	(0)
2016	Poli Timișoara	10	(3)
2016–2017	Viitorul Constanța	18	(4)
2017	Stabæk	13	(2)
2018	Honka	20	(0)
2019	Kettering Town	4	(0)
Total		95	(10)

International career
2009	England U20	3	(1)
- * Club domestic league appearances and goals

Alex Tchuimeni-Nimely (born 11 May 1991) is a Liberian former professional footballer who played as a forward. He is the elder brother of Liberia international Sylvanus Nimely.

A former England under-20 international, he accepted a call-up to play for Liberia in October 2016. He began his career with Mighty Barrolle (Liberia) and Coton de Garoua (Cameroon) before joining Manchester City in 2008. He spent six years at the club but only played one Premier League game, and instead spent time on loan at Middlesbrough, Coventry City, and Crystal Palace. He signed with Port Vale for a short and unhappy spell in November 2014. After a year away from the game, he signed with Romanian club Poli Timișoara in February 2016. He moved on to Viitorul Constanța in July 2016 before signing with Norwegian side Stabæk in April 2017. He moved to Finland in February 2018 to play for Honka. He returned to England to sign for Kettering Town in August 2019.

== Club career ==
=== Manchester City ===
Born in Monrovia, Liberia, Nimely began his career at Liberian Premier League side Mighty Barrolle, who won the league title in 2006. He moved on to Cameroonian side Coton de Garoua, who won the Elite One title in 2006, 2007 and 2007–08 seasons.

He went on trial with Manchester City in December 2007 before signing a four-year deal with the club in January 2008. He helped City win the FA Youth Cup in 2008. He made his Premier League debut during a 6–1 win over Burnley at Turf Moor on 3 April 2010. He signed a new four-year contract with the club the following month. He featured in a 1–1 draw with Juventus at the Stadio Olimpico Grande Torino on 16 December 2010 that ensured City won their UEFA Europa League group; he was taken off for Pablo Zabaleta on 61 minutes.

On 17 September 2011, he signed a three-month loan deal with Championship side Middlesbrough. His first appearance came in the League Cup three days later as "Boro" were beaten 2–1 by Crystal Palace at Selhurst Park. He went on to make nine league appearances at the club, though he did not start another game. On 12 January 2012, he signed a loan deal with Coventry City until the end of the 2011–12 season after manager Andy Thorn described him as a "hot young prospect". He scored his first goal in the English Football League on his "Sky Blues" debut in a 3–1 victory over former club Middlesbrough at the Ricoh Arena.

On 10 January 2013, he signed on loan with Crystal Palace until the end of the 2012–13 season, with manager Ian Holloway stating that "I've admired him for a couple of years". He made his debut two days later, coming on as a substitute in a 1–0 defeat at Burnley. He played only one further game for the club before returning to the City of Manchester Stadium.

=== Port Vale ===
Nimely signed a contract with League One side Port Vale in November 2014 to keep him at Vale Park until the end of the 2014–15 season. He began training with Bolton Wanderers in January 2015. The next month he was disciplined by "Valiants" manager Rob Page after staying away from Vale Park without permission. In March, he again missed training without permission. Whilst still missing from training he offered to play for Coventry City for free but his offer was rejected by manager Tony Mowbray, who said the player did not perform well during his time at Middlesbrough when Mowbray was manager there. He was released in May 2015.

=== Romania ===
Nimely signed with Romanian Liga I club Poli Timișoara in February 2016. He scored three goals in ten games in the 2015–16 season. He signed with Viitorul Constanța in July 2016. He scored six goals in 21 matches in the 2016–17 season under the stewardship of manager Gheorghe Hagi.

=== Stabæk ===
Nimely signed a two-year contract with Norwegian Eliteserien club Stabæk on 1 April 2017 after the club purchased him for an undisclosed fee. However, the form of Ohi Omoijuanfo kept Nimley on the bench, and limited him to just two goals from one league start and 12 league substitute appearances. Nimely subsequently requested the termination of his contract so that he could find regular football elsewhere, and the club agreed to release him just ten weeks after he arrived in Bærum.

=== FC Honka ===
After going on trial with Azerbaijan Premier League club Kapaz PFK, Nimely signed for Veikkausliiga club FC Honka on 7 February 2018. He made 25 appearances in the 2018 season, helping Honka to a fifth-place finish.

=== Kettering Town ===
Nimely returned to England and joined National League North side Kettering Town in August 2019.

== International career ==
In May 2010, Nimely rejected a call-up from Liberia for 2010 World Cup qualifiers and declared to the press that he had chosen to play for England, as his father is English. He was called up to the under-20 squad for the 2009 U-20 World Cup in Egypt. He scored a goal in a 1–1 draw with Uzbekistan at the Mubarak International Stadium on 2 October. This was the only goal England scored in the tournament, and they were eliminated at the Group Stage. He received his first call up to the under-21 side in November 2011 but was forced to withdraw from the squad due to injury.

He accepted a call-up for Liberia in October 2016 and was an unused substitute in a friendly match against Kenya on 15 November 2016.

== Personal life ==
Nimely was fined £600 and banned from driving for 18 months after admitting to driving with excess alcohol in January 2014; he had been charged after crashing his car in Manchester. He has a younger brother, Sylvanus, who plays in Liberia and has been capped for the senior Liberia squad.

== Career statistics ==
Appearances and goals by club, season and competition
Club	Season	League			National cup (Note: Includes Cupa României, Norwegian Cup, Finnish Cup)		League cup (Note: Includes EFL Cup, Cupa Ligii)		Other		Total	
Club	Season	Division	Apps	Goals	Apps	Goals	Apps	Goals	Apps	Goals	Apps	Goals
Manchester City	2008–09	Premier League	0	0	0	0	0	0	0	0	0	0
Manchester City	2009–10	Premier League	1	0	0	0	0	0	0	0	1	0
Manchester City	2010–11	Premier League	0	0	0	0	0	0	1 (Note: Appearance in UEFA Europa League.)	0	1	0
Manchester City	2011–12	Premier League	0	0	0	0	0	0	0	0	0	0
Manchester City	2012–13	Premier League	0	0	0	0	0	0	0	0	0	0
Manchester City	2013–14	Premier League	0	0	0	0	0	0	0	0	0	0
Manchester City	Total		1	0	0	0	0	0	1	0	2	0
Middlesbrough (loan)	2011–12	Championship	9	0	0	0	1	0	—		10	0
Coventry City (loan)	2011–12	Championship	17	1	—		—		—		17	1
Crystal Palace (loan)	2012–13	Championship	2	0	0	0	—		0	0	2	0
Port Vale	2014–15	League One	1	0	0	0	0	0	0	0	1	0
Poli Timișoara	2015–16	Liga I	10	3	0	0	—		0	0	10	3
Viitorul Constanța	2016–17	Liga I	18	4	1	2	1	0	1	0	21	6
Stabæk	2017	Eliteserien	13	2	1	1	—		0	0	14	3
Honka	2018	Veikkausliiga	20	0	5	0	0	0	0	0	25	0
Kettering Town	2019–20	National League North	4	0	0	0	—		0	0	4	0
Career total			95	10	7	3	2	0	2	0	106	13
