= Boniface Doe =

Personal information
- Full name: Boniface Doe
- Date of birth: 14 May 1957 (age 69)
- Place of birth: Grand Cess, Liberia
- Height: 5 ft 9 in (1.75 m)
- Position: Midfielder

Team information
- Current team: Eastern Cape Bees (Technical Director)

Senior career*
Years	Team	Apps	(Gls)
1973–1979	Saint Joseph Warriors FC		
1980–1982	Mighty Barrolle		
1982–1989	NPA Anchor		

International career
1982–1989	Liberia		

Managerial career
- 1987–1988: Saint Joseph Warriors FC
- 1988–1990: NPA Anchors
- 1990–1991: Kolantan Rover
- 1991–1992: Black Star
- 1993–1995: NITEL Vasco Da Gama F.C.
- 1996–1997: Shooting Stars
- 1997–1998: AmaZulu F.C. (Coach Manager)
- 1998–1999: Durban United F.C.
- 2000–2001: Max Bees FC
- 2001–2002: Sportnet FC
- 2002–2003: Japer United FC
- 2003–2004: Durban Stars F.C.
- 2004–2005: Bloemfontein Celtic F.C.
- 2005–2006: Nathi Lions F.C.
- 2006–2007: Durban Stars F.C.
- 2007–2008: Nathi Lions F.C.
- 2008–2009: Hanover Park FC
- 2009: Thanda Royal Zulu
- 2010–2013: Sharks Soccer Academy
- 2014–2015: Mthathe F.C. SAB North Stream
- Sgcino Cosmos F.C. SAB
- * Club domestic league appearances and goals

Boniface Doe (born 14 January 1957) is a Liberian professional football coach and former player who is the current technical director of the South African football club Eastern Cape Bees F.C.

Boniface is the most successful Liberian coach. He led the Nigerian Premier League club Shooting Stars to the 1996 African Cup of Champions Clubs Final. He was one of the five coaches who were short-listed for the Liberian National Team coaching job.

== Achievements ==
2004 Helped Bloemfontein Cletics, promoted to Premier League

2000 Led Max Bees (Ghana) from 1st Division to Premier League

1996 Runner-up silver medal with 3 SC Shooting Stars of Nigeria in the African Club Championship. CAF championship (formerly Sekou Toure Cup)

1996 Won OYO State Challenge Cup with 3 SC Shooting Stars of Ibandan Nigeria

1993 Led Nitel Vasco Dagama from 1st Division to Premier League, Nigeria

1992 Won the Lagos State Amateur League with French Embassy FC, Nigeria

1991 Won the Northern Zone Championship with Kolentern Rover F.C., Sierra Leone
