= 1979 Liberian Premier League =

Association football season in Liberia

During the Liberian Premier League in 1979 Saint Joseph Warriors FC from Monrovia won the championship. They defeated Mighty Barolle.
