= Aloysius Simujla =

Liberian footballer

Personal information
- Full name: Aloysius Snosie Simujla
- Date of birth: 22 June 1994 (age 32)
- Place of birth: Monrovia, Liberia
- Height: 1.78 m (5 ft 10 in)
- Position: Left back

Team information
- Current team: LPRC Oilers

Senior career*
Years	Team	Apps	(Gls)
2013–2017	FC Fassell		
2018–	LPRC Oilers		

International career^{‡}
2013–	Liberia	9	(0)
- * Club domestic league appearances and goals as of 11:27, 7 November 2019 (UTC) ‡ National team caps and goals as of 11:27, 7 November 2019 (UTC)

Aloysius Snosie Simujla (born 22 June 1994) is a Liberian footballer who plays for LPRC Oilers as a left back.

== Career ==
Born in Monrovia, Simujla has played club football for FC Fassell and LPRC Oilers.

He made his international debut for Liberia in 2013.
