= 2013 Liberian Premier League =

Association football season in Liberia

During the Liberian Premier League in 2013 Barrack Young Controllers FC from Monrovia won the championship.
