= 2012 Liberian Premier League =

Association football season in Liberia

There were sixteen teams who competed in the Liberian Premier League in the 2012 season. LISCR FC from Monrovia won the championship.
