= Frederick Dennis =

Liberian footballer

Personal information
- Date of birth: 2 May 2003 (age 23)
- Place of birth: Liberia
- Position: Midfielder

Team information
- Current team: FC Fassell

Senior career*
| Years | Team | Apps | (Gls) |
| –2020 | Tony FC | | |
| 2020– | FC Fassell | | |

International career^{‡}
| 2021– | Liberia | 1 | (0) |
- * Club domestic league appearances and goals ‡ National team caps and goals as of 02:20, 17 March 2022 (UTC)

Frederick Dennis (born 2 May 2003) is a Liberian professional footballer who plays as a midfielder for Liberian Second Division club FC Fassell and the Liberia national team.
