= Gasimu Kouyateh =

Liberian footballer

Personal information
- Full name: Gasimu Sheikh Kouyateh
- Date of birth: 7 May 1999 (age 27)
- Place of birth: Monrovia, Liberia
- Height: 1.85 m (6 ft 1 in)
- Position: Left-back

Team information
- Current team: LISCR FC

Senior career*
Years	Team	Apps	(Gls)
2018–2019	PAGS FC		
2019–	LISCR FC		

International career^{‡}
2019–	Liberia	6	(0)
- * Club domestic league appearances and goals ‡ National team caps and goals as of 02:06, 17 March 2022 (UTC)

Gasimu Sheikh Kouyateh (born 7 May 1999) is a Liberian professional footballer who plays as a left-back for Liberian First Division club LISCR FC and the Liberia national team.
