= Tony FC =

Football club based in Margibi County, Liberia

- Full name: Tony Football Club
- League: LFA Second Division
- 2021–22: LFA Second Division, 5th of 14

Tony Football Club is a football club based in Margibi County, Liberia.

As of the 2021–22 season, the team competes in the Liberian Second Division. In 2022, the club reached the final of the Liberian FA Cup, losing in a penalty shoot-out to LISCR FC following a 2–2 draw.

== Notable players ==
- (Liberia) Frederick Dennis
