= Morlik Keita =

Liberian footballer

Personal information
- Date of birth: 3 September 1994 (age 32)
- Place of birth: Liberia
- Position: Goalkeeper

Team information
- Current team: Mighty Barrolle

Senior career*
Years	Team	Apps	(Gls)
2019–	Mighty Barrolle		

International career^{‡}
2021–	Liberia	1	(0)
- * Club domestic league appearances and goals ‡ National team caps and goals as of 15:51, 17 March 2022 (UTC)

Morlik Keita (born 3 September 1994) is a Liberian professional footballer who plays as a goalkeeper for Liberian First Division club Mighty Barrolle and the Liberia national team.
