= Harrison Kennedy =

Harrison Kennedy may refer to:

- Harrison Kennedy (footballer)
- Harrison Kennedy (musician)
