= 1976 Liberian Premier League =

Association football season in Liberia

During the Liberian Premier League in 1976 Saint Joseph Warriors FC from Monrovia won the championship.
