= 2007 Liberian Premier League =

Association football season in Liberia

There were twelve teams who competed in the Liberian Premier League in 2007. Invincible Eleven from Monrovia won the championship.
