= Boakai =

Boakai is a surname or middle name. Notable people with this name include:

- Joseph Boakai (born 1944), a Liberian politician
- Hanson Boakai (born 1996), a Canadian soccer player of Liberian descent
- Varney Boakai Sando (born 1995), a Liberian football player
