= 1994 Liberian Premier League =

Association football season in Liberia

There were fifteen teams who competed in the Liberian Premier League in 1994. National Port Authority Anchors from Monrovia won the championship.
