= James Zotiah =

Liberian footballer

Personal information
- Full name: James Zotiah
- Date of birth: April 7, 1988 (age 38)
- Place of birth: Monrovia, Liberia
- Height: 1.70 m (5 ft 7 in)
- Position: Midfielder

Team information
- Current team: Black Star

Senior career*
Years	Team	Apps	(Gls)
1993–2003	Deviol Trainees		
2003–2005	Karn United		
2005–2008	Black Star		

International career
2007–2012	Liberia	8	(0)
- * Club domestic league appearances and goals as of 30 February 2009

James Zotiah (born April 7, 1988) is a Liberian former footballer who last played as a midfielder for Black Star. He was also a member of the Liberia national team. He made his international debut in 2007 against Rwanda.
