= 1974 Liberian Premier League =

Association football season in Liberia

During the Liberian Premier League in 1974 Mighty Barrolle from Monrovia won the championship.
