= 1967 Liberian Premier League =

Association football season in Liberia

During the Liberian Premier League in 1967 Mighty Barrolle from Monrovia won the championship.
