= 1966 Liberian Premier League =

Association football season in Liberia

During the Liberian Premier League in 1963 Invincible Eleven from Monrovia won the championship.
