= 2018 Liberian FA Cup =

2018 Liberian Cup
Tournament details
- Country: Liberia

Final positions
- Champions: Barrack Young Controllers

The 2018 Liberian Cup is the 2018 edition of the Liberian FA Cup, the knockout football competition of Liberia.

== Quarterfinals ==
[Sep 29]

NPA Anchors 0-0 FC BEA Mountain [aet, 3-1 pen]

LISCR 2-1 Watanga

Barrack Young Controllers 3-0 Paynesville FC

[Sep 30]

MC Breweries 2-0 Nimba Kwadoe

== Semifinals ==
[Oct 5]

Barrack Young Controllers 4-2 NPA Anchors [aet]

LISCR 2-0 MC Breweries

== Final ==
[Oct 19, The Antoinette Tubman Stadium, Monrovia]

Barrack Young Controllers 4-0 LISCR

== See also ==
- 2018 Liberian First Division League
