= 1991 Liberian Premier League =

Association football season in Liberia

During the Liberian Premier League in 1991 LPRC Oilers from Monrovia won the championship.
