= 1986 Liberian Premier League =

Association football season in Liberia

There were twelve teams who competed in the Liberian Premier League in 1986. Mighty Barrolle from Monrovia won the championship.
