= Ganta Black Stars =

Liberian football club

- Full name: Ganta Black Stars
- Ground: Ganta Sports Stadium; Ganta, Liberia
- Capacity: 3,000
- League: Liberian Premier League
- 2013–14: 10th

Ganta Black Stars is a club based in Ganta Liberia. The team plays in Liberian Premier League the top league of Liberian Football.

== Stadium ==
Their home stadium is the Ganta Sports Stadium in Ganta.

== League participations ==
- Liberian Premier League: 2013– (As Ganta)
- Liberian Second Division League: ????–2013
