= 1965 Liberian Premier League =

Association football season in Liberia

During the Liberian Premier League in 1965 Invincible Eleven from Monrovia won the championship.
