= 1984 Liberian Premier League =

Association football season in Liberia

There were eight teams who competed in the Liberian Premier League in 1984. Invincible Eleven from Monrovia won the championship.
