= 2008 Liberian Premier League =

Association football season in Liberia

There were sixteen teams who competed in the Liberian Premier League in 2008. Monrovia Black Star Football Club from Monrovia won the championship.
