= Melvin George =

Melvin George may refer to:

- Melvin Clark George, U.S. Representative from Oregon
- Melvin Boban George, Liberian footballer
- Mel George, American educator
