= 1996 Liberian Premier League =

Association football season in Liberia

During the Liberian Premier League in 1996 Junior Professional FC from Monrovia won the championship.
