= 1972 Liberian Premier League =

Association football season in Liberia

During the Liberian Premier League in 1972 Mighty Barrolle from Monrovia won the championship.
