= 1985 Liberian Premier League =

Association football competition

During the Liberian Premier League in 1985 Invincible Eleven from Monrovia won the championship.
