= 1997 Liberian Premier League =

Association football season in Liberia

During the Liberian Premier League in 1997 Liberia Petroleum Refining Company Oilers from Monrovia won the championship.
