= 1980 Liberian Premier League =

Association football season in Liberia

During the Liberian Premier League in 1980 Invincible Eleven from Monrovia won the championship.
