= 1998 Liberian Premier League =

Association football season in Liberia

During the Liberian Premier League in 1998 Invincible Eleven from Monrovia won the championship.
