= 1999 Liberian Premier League =

Association football season in Liberia

There were nine teams who competed in the Liberian Premier League in 1999. Invincible Eleven from Monrovia won the championship.
