= Monrovia Breweries =

Founded in 1957 as a corporate under the Liberian Laws and started the production of Club in 1961, Monrovia Breweries is a brewery based in Monrovia, the capital city of Liberia. They are the primary sponsor of the Monrovia Club Breweries football team, and are a subsidiary of the Diageo alcoholic beverages company.
