= Tommy Songo =

Liberian footballer

Personal information
- Date of birth: 20 April 1995 (age 31)
- Place of birth: Monrovia, Liberia
- Height: 1.85 m (6 ft 1 in)
- Position: Goalkeeper

Team information
- Current team: LISCR

Senior career*
Years	Team	Apps	(Gls)
2013–	LISCR		

International career^{‡}
2015–	Liberia	27	(0)
- * Club domestic league appearances and goals as of 11:43, 19 September 2018 (UTC) ‡ National team caps and goals as of 19:14, 25 September 2026 (UTC)

Tommy Songo (born 20 April 1995) is a Liberian footballer who plays for LISCR as a goalkeeper.

== Career ==
Born in Monrovia, Songo plays for LISCR.

He made his international debut for Liberia in 2015.

== Career statistics ==
=== International ===
As of match played 25 September 2026

Appearances and goals by national team and year
National team	Year	Apps	Goals
Liberia	2015	3	0
Liberia	2016	4	0
Liberia	2017	2	0
Liberia	2018	3	0
Liberia	2019	1	0
Liberia	2021	3	0
Liberia	2022	4	0
Liberia	2023	2	0
Liberia	2024	1	0
Liberia	2025	3	0
Liberia	2026	1	0
Total		27	0
