= Harrison Kennedy (footballer) =

Liberian footballer

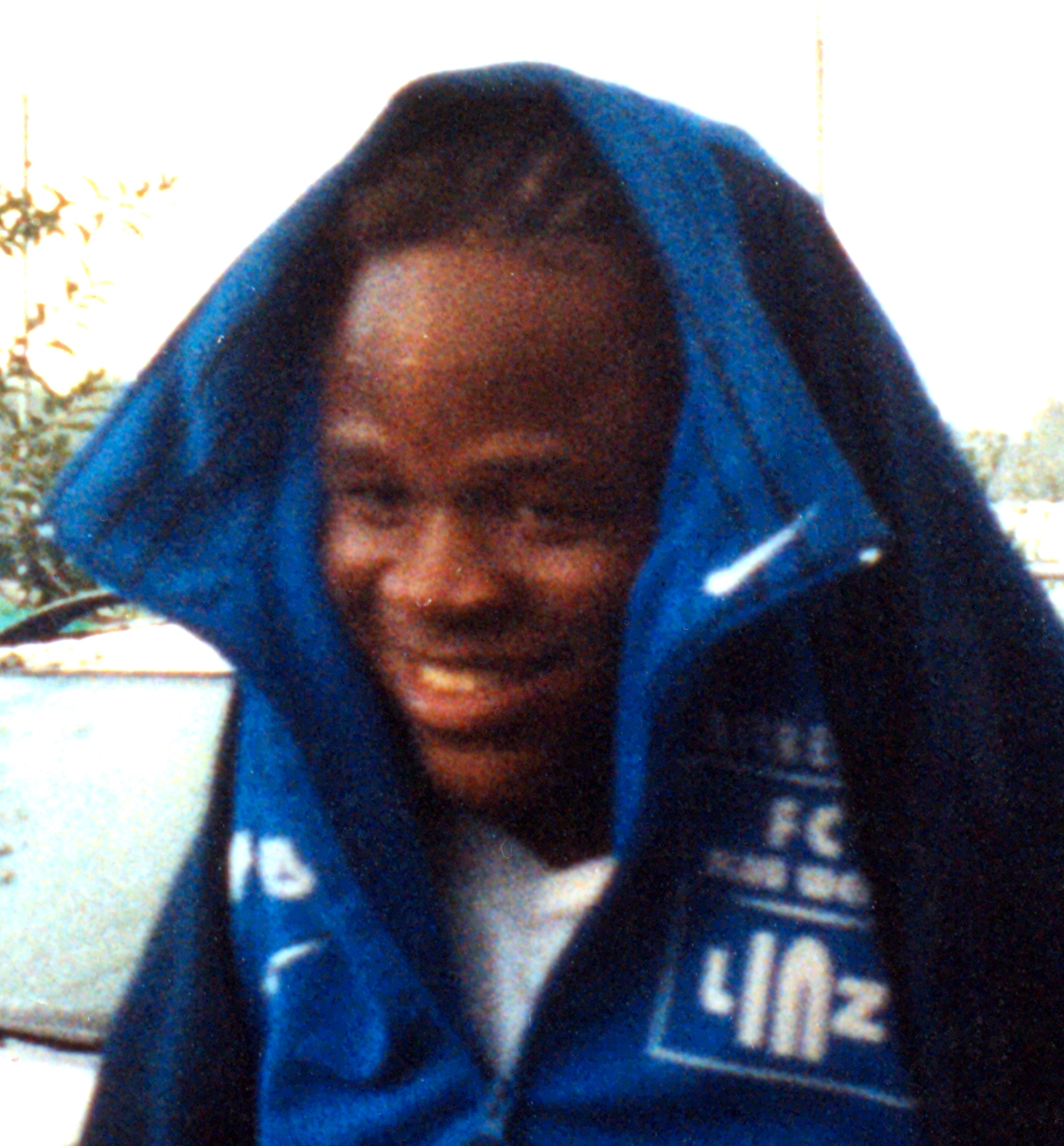
- Harrison Kennedy

Personal information
- Full name: Harrison Kennedy
- Date of birth: October 15, 1989 (age 37)
- Place of birth: Monrovia, Liberia
- Height: 1.65 m (5 ft 5 in)
- Position: Striker

Team information
- Current team: Mark Professionals

Youth career
- 2004–2005: Superfund

Senior career*
Years	Team	Apps	(Gls)
2005–2006	FC Blau-Weiss Linz	20	(2)
2006–2010	FC Pasching	48	(8)
2006–2007	→ Vöcklabruck (loan)	11	(0)
2011–	Mark Professionals		
- * Club domestic league appearances and goals

Harrison Kennedy (born October 15, 1989) is a Liberian footballer who is currently playing for Mark Professionals.
