= Liberia Football Association =

Association football governing body in Liberia

CAF
- Founded: 1936
- FIFA affiliation: 1964
- CAF affiliation: 1962
- President: Mustapha I. Raji
- Website: lfa-lr.com

The Liberia Football Association is the governing body of football in Liberia. Its offices are located at Antoinette Tubman Stadium in Monrovia.

== National teams ==
=== Men's national team ===
The Liberian men's national football team represents Liberia in international football competitions at the senior men's level. The national team has never qualified for the FIFA World Cup but has qualified for the Africa Cup of Nations on two occasions, in 1996, and 2002.

=== Women's national team ===
The Liberian women's national football team represents Liberia in international football competitions at the senior women's level.

=== Youth national teams ===
The Liberia Football Association also operates the following national youth football teams:

- Liberia men's national under-23 (Olympic) football team
- Liberia men's national under-20 football team
- Liberia boys' national under-17 football team
- Liberia women's national under-20 football team
- Liberia girls' national under-17 football team

== Clubs ==
=== Liberian First Division League (2024–2025) ===
- Bea Mountain FC
- Black Man Warriors
- Discoveries S.A.
- FC Fassell
- Freeport FC
- Global Pharma FC
- Heaven Eleven FC
- Invincible Eleven
- LISCR FC
- LPRC Oilers
- Mighty Barrolle FC
- Paynesville FC
- Shaita FC
- Watanga FC

=== LFA 2nd Division (2024–2025) ===
- CeCe United
- District 17 Academy
- Downtown FC
- Gardnersville FC
- Gompa FC
- Jubilee FC
- Junior Pro FC
- Margibi FC
- Mighty Enforcers
- Nimba Kwado FC
- NPA Anchors
- Philly Lone Star
- Samira FC
- Sinoe NPA
- PAGS FC
- Wologizi FC

=== Orange Upper Women’s Division (2024–2025) ===
- Ambassadors FC
- Determine Girls FC
- Earth Angels FC
- Kneeling Warriors
- Ravia Angels
- Real Muja FC
- Senior Professionals F C
- Shaita Angels
- Soccer Ambassador
- Stages Queens
- World Girls FC
