= Doris Williams Stadium =

Football stadium in Liberia, Africa

- Interactive map of Doris Williams Stadium
- Location: Buchanan, Liberia
- Capacity: 3,000
- Surface: Artificial turf

Construction
- Renovated: 2012
- General contractor: CJ Construction (2012-2013)

Tenant
- Mighty Barrolle

Doris Williams Stadium is a multi-use stadium in Grand Bassa County, Buchanan, Liberia. It is currently used mostly for football matches on club level by Mighty Barrolle of the Liberian Premier League. The stadium has a capacity of 3,000 spectators.

== Renovation ==
In July 2012, funds of $538,482,000 (~$745 million in 2025) were approved by Grand Bassa County administration to begin renovations on the Doris Williams Stadium. The county had plans to expand to 6,000 seats, build an administrative building, ticket and security booths, reinforced concrete bleachers, two VIP seated areas, parking lots, and fund landscaping.

The county had paid the contractor, CJ Construction Inc., 75% of the total cost, with an initial payment of $161,544.60. CJ Construction renovated an existing fence, gates, and some toilets. However, 100% of the construction had not been finished by the appropriate deadline, prompting an investigation.

The failure of the contractors to deliver prompted community leaders, sports players, and social justice groups to speak out about the failures of CJ Construction to adhere to the agreement.

James Johnson, head of CJ Construction, cited a change in county leadership in 2013 as the reason for the failure to complete the work, saying that the government successors never followed up on the construction project.

In 2014, the Bassanonian community and local leaders again expressed public concern and frustration for the appearance of the stadium and had urged the Grand Bossa County administration to renovate and "beautify" the stadium.

== Future Renovation Plans ==
The FIFA Regional Development Office proposed the addition of new turf to Doris Williams Stadium in the spring of 2019.
