= Devereux FC =

Liberian football club

Devereux
- Full name: Devereux Football Club
- Founded: 14 November 1991; 33 years ago
- Ground: Bong Mines Soccer Pitch, Logan Town, Bushrod Island, Monrovia, Liberia
- League: Liberian Premier League

Devereux Football Club is a football club based in Logan Town, Bushrod Island, Monrovia, Liberia. It was established in 1991 by friends of Silesia's brother Sean Devereux, a philanthropist who worked during the crisis in Liberia. Devereux F.C. is an affiliate of the Sean Devereux Children Foundation based in the United Kingdom; and associates with other Sean Devereux Programs in Liberia. The club's vision is "to transform street kids into career personnel through the means of soccer".
