= 2016–17 Liberian First Division League =

43rd season of Liberian Premier League

Liberian First Division League
- Season: 2016–17
- Champions: LISCR FC

The 2016–17 Liberian First Division League is the 43rd season of the Liberian Premier League, the Liberian professional league for association football clubs, since the league's establishment in 1956. The season started on 2 December 2016 and concluded on 9 August 2017.

== Standings ==
Pos	Team	Pld	W	D	L	GF	GA	GD	Pts	Qualification or relegation
1	LISCR	22	10	12	0	30	12	+18	42	Champions
2	Barrack Young Controllers	22	11	6	5	34	14	+20	39	
3	MC Breweries	22	10	6	6	22	19	+3	36	
4	Nimba United	22	9	8	5	30	21	+9	35	
5	Watanga FC	22	10	5	7	22	16	+6	35	
6	FC Fassell	22	11	1	10	34	26	+8	34	
7	Jubilee FC	22	8	6	8	20	24	−4	30	
8	Keitrace FC	22	6	11	5	28	28	0	29	
9	LPRC Oilers	22	6	7	9	15	17	−2	25	
10	Mighty Barrolle	22	7	3	12	24	30	−6	24	Relegated
11	Invincible Eleven	22	4	3	15	22	45	−23	15	Relegated
12	ELWA United	22	2	8	12	16	45	−29	14	Relegated

Source: rsssf.com
