= Srimex FC =

Liberian football club

Srimex FC (formerly ELWA United) is a Liberian football club.

== Achievements ==
- Liberian Premier League: 0
- Liberian Cup: 0

Runners-up: 2017

- Liberian Super Cup: 0

Runners-up: 2018

== Performance in CAF competitions ==
- CAF Confederation Cup: 1 appearance

2018 –
