= Nimba FC =

Liberian football club

- Full name: Nimba Football Club
- Nickname(s): Samba boys
- Founded: July 10, 2005
- Ground: Ganta Sports Grounds, Ganta, Nimba County, Liberia
- Capacity: 10,500
- Chairman: (Liberia) Stephen Sangareh
- Manager: (Liberia) Harold Tubman
- League: LFA Second Division
- 2021–21: LFA Second Division, 8th of 14
- Website: Official website

Nimba Football Club is a Professional football club based in Ganta, Nimba County, Liberia.

== Players ==
=== First-team squad ===
As of 10 November 2018

Note: Flags indicate national team as defined under FIFA eligibility rules; some limited exceptions apply. Players may hold more than one non-FIFA nationality.

No.	Pos.	Nation	Player
16	MF	(Liberia) LBR	Danny Gboh
6	FW	(Liberia) LBR	Ebenezer Kollie
12	MF	(Liberia) LBR	Christopher Kpreh

==== Notable former players ====
- (Liberia) Sam Johnson (footballer, born 1993)
