= St Anthony FC =

Liberian football club

Saint Anthony
- Full name: Saint Anthony (Liberia) Football Club
- Ground: Blue Field Sports Ground; Monrovia, Liberia
- Capacity: 1,000
- League: Liberian Premier League

Saint Anthony (Liberia) is a football club based in Monrovia, Liberia.

The team plays in Liberian Third Division.

== Stadium ==
Their home Stadium is the Blue Field Sports Ground.
