= Bame Monrovia =

Football club based in Monrovia, Liberia

- Full name: Bame Monrovia
- Founded: 1934
- Ground: Antonette Tubman Stadium, Monrovia, Liberia
- Capacity: 10,000
- League: Liberian Premier League

Bame Monrovia is a football club based in Monrovia, Liberia.

The team was founded in 1934.

== Stadium ==
Currently the team plays at the 10,000 Antonette Tubman Stadium.

== Performance in CAF competitions ==
- CAF Champions League: 1 appearance

1975 African Cup of Champions Clubs – first round
