= Mark Professionals FC =

Liberian football club

Mark Professionals
- Full name: Mark Professionals Football Club
- Nickname(s): Mark's Pro.
- Ground: Antonette Tubman Stadium; Monrovia, Liberia
- Chairman: (Liberia) Amos D. Gayflor
- League: Liberian Premier League

Mark Professionals was a football (soccer) club from Liberia based in Monrovia. Their home stadium was the Antonette Tubman Stadium. They never won the Liberian Premier League (LPL) or the Liberian Cup in their history. The club dissolved at the end of the 2007 season.

== Achievements ==
- Liberian Premier League: None
- Liberian Cup: None
