= Junior Professional FC =

Liberian football club

Junior Professional
- Full name: Junior Professional Football Club
- Founded: March 19, 1980
- Ground: unknown
- Capacity: unknown
- Chairman: George Weah
- League: LFA Second Division
- 2021–22: LFA Second Division, 9th of 14

== History ==
The Junior Professional Football Club was founded on March 19, 1980. The most famous player is Zizi Roberts and it won in 1996 the Liberian Premier League.

== Honors ==
- Liberian Premier League: 1

1996

- Liberian Cup: 1

1996
