= Liberian FA Cup =

Liberian football competition

- Founded: 1974
- Region: Liberia
- Teams: 30 (2024)
- Current champions: Paynesville (1st title)
- Most championships: Mighty Barrolle (8 titles)

The Liberian Football Association Cup, commonly known as the LFA Cup and currently known as the PetroTrade Cup due to sponsorship reasons, is an annual knockout cup competition in Liberian football. The LFA Cup is run by and named after the Liberia Football Association and usually refers to the Liberian men's tournament, although an LFA Women's Cup is also held.

The LFA Cup was first held in 1974 with Mighty Barrolle being crowned the first champions. Entry is open to all teams who compete in the Liberian First and Second Divisions. The reigning champion is LISCR FC, who defeated Tony FC in the 2022 final.

== Format ==
The competition is a knockout tournament with pairings for each round drawn at random. There are no seeds and the draw for each round is not made until after the scheduled dates for the previous round. The draw also determines which teams will play at home. Each tie is played as a single leg. If a match is drawn, there is a 30-minute overtime, and penalty shoot-outs if needed.

=== Draw ===
The draw for each of the rounds is unseeded and is held at the LFA Headquarters.

=== Eligible teams ===
All clubs in the Liberian Premier League and Second Division League are automatically eligible.

=== African qualification ===
The LFA Cup winners qualify for the following season's CAF Confederation Cup. This African place applies even if the team is relegated or is not in the Liberian top flight. However, if the LFA Cup winning team has also qualified for the following season's Champions League, then the losing LFA Cup finalist is given the Confederation Cup place instead. LFA Cup winners enter the Confederation Cup at the Qualifiers Stage.

The LFA Cup winners also qualify for the single-match LFA Super Cup against the Liberian Premier League Champions.

== Venues ==
Matches in the LFA Cup are usually played at the home ground of one of the two teams. The team who plays at home is decided when the matches are drawn. There is no seeding system in place within rounds other than when teams enter the competition, therefore the home team is simply the first team drawn out for each fixture. Occasionally games may have to be moved to other grounds due to other events taking place, security reasons or a ground not being suitable to host popular teams.

The LFA Cup Final is usually held at the Antoinette Tubman Stadium

== Sponsorship ==
The LFA Cup doesn't have sponsors at this moment.

== LFA Cup winners ==
Five clubs have won consecutive LFA Cups on more than one occasion: Cedar United (1976, 1977), Mighty Barrolle (1983, 1984, 1985, 1986), LPRC Oilers (1988, 1989 and 1999, 2000), Invincible Eleven (1997, 1998)and LISCR FC (2003, 2004).

Seven clubs have won the LFA Cup as part of a League and Cup double, namely Mighty Barrolle (1974, 1986, 1995), Invincible Eleven (1987, 1997, 1998), NPA Anchors (1994), Junior Professionals (1996), LPRCOilers (1999, 2005), Monrovia Black Stars (2008) and Barrack Young Controllers (2013). Mighty Barrolle and Invincible Eleven share the record of three doubles. Mighty Barrolle have won a double in each of three separate decades (1970s, 1980s, 1990s). Invincible Eleven's three doubles between 1987-1998 highlight their dominance of Liberian football at the time.

== LFA Cup winners and finalists ==
- 1974 : Mighty Barrolle (Monrovia)
- 1975 : not played
- 1976 : Cedar United (Monrovia)
- 1977 : Cedar United (Monrovia)
- 1978 : Mighty Barrolle (Monrovia)
- 1979 : not played
- 1980 : not played
- 1981 : Mighty Barrolle (Monrovia)
- 1982 : Saint Joseph Warriors
- 1983 : Mighty Barrolle (Monrovia)
- 1984 : Mighty Barrolle (Monrovia)
- 1985 : Mighty Barrolle (Monrovia)
- 1986 : Mighty Barrolle (Monrovia)
- 1987 : Invincible Eleven (Monrovia)
- 1988 : LPRC Oilers (Monrovia)
- 1989 : LPRC Oilers (Monrovia)
- 1990 : not played
- 1991 : Invincible Eleven (Monrovia)
- 1992 : NPA Anchors (Monrovia) 3–1 Invincible Eleven
- 1993 : LPRC Oilers (Monrovia)
- 1994 : Monrovia Club Breweries (Monrovia)
- 1995 : Mighty Barrolle (Monrovia)
- 1996 : Junior Professional (Monrovia)
- 1997 : Invincible Eleven (Monrovia)
- 1998 : Invincible Eleven (Monrovia) 1–2 1–0 Junior Professional
- 1999 : LPRC Oilers (Monrovia)
- 2000 : LPRC Oilers (Monrovia)
- 2001 : not known
- 2002 : Mighty Blue Angels (Unific. Town) bt Mark Professionals
- 2003 : LISCR
- 2004 : LISCR 2–0 Bassa Defender
- 2005 : LPRC Oilers (Monrovia)
- 2006 : NPA Anchors (Monrovia) 2–2 (aet), (3–2 p) Mighty Barrolle (Monrovia)
- 2007 : Saint Joseph Warriors bt LISCR
- 2008 : Monrovia Black Star (Monrovia) 4–1 Mighty Barrolle
- 2009 : Barrack Young Controllers 1–0 LPRC Oilers (Monrovia)
- 2010 : Aries 4–3 Monrovia Black Star
- 2010–11 : Invincible Eleven 1–0 Barrack Young Controllers
- 2012 : Barrack Young Controllers II (reserve side) 1–0 Watanga FC
- 2013 : Barrack Young Controllers 6–0 Fatu FC
- 2013–14 : FC Fassell 1–0 NPA Anchors (Monrovia)
- 2015 : Barrack Young Controllers II (reserve side) 0–0 (aet), (3–2 p) Monrovia Club Breweries
- 2016 : Monrovia Breweries 2–0 (awarded) Mighty Barrolle (Monrovia)
- 2017 : LISCR 3–0 ELWA United
- 2018 : Barrack Young Controllers 4–0 LISCR
- 2019 : LISCR 2–0 Barrack Young Controllers
- 2019–20 : Abandoned
- 2020–21 : Monrovia Club Breweries 2–1 Watanga
- 2021–22 : LISCR 2–2 (aet), (4–2 p) Tony
- 2022–23 : LISCR 2–0 Watanga
- 2023–24 : Paynesville 1–0 Invincible Eleven
- 2024–25 : Black Man Warrior 1–1 (3–1 p) LISCR

== See also ==
- Liberia national football team
