= Nimba United FC =

Liberian football club

Nimba United
- Full name: Nimba United Football Club
- Nickname: The "Mountaineers"
- Founded: 2011; 14 years ago
- Ground: NorthStar Sports Stadium, Mount Barclay, Montserrado County, Liberia
- League: LFA First Division
- 2021–22: LFA First Division, 6th of 12
- Website: http://www.nimbaunitedfc.com.lr
Home colors	Away colors

Nimba United Football Club is a football club based in Sanniquellie, Nimba County, Liberia.

Winning the Liberian Premier League title in 2015, they became the first domestic champions not from the capital city since 1963.

== Achievements ==
- Liberian Premier League: 1
- Liberian First Division League: 1
- Liberian Cup: 0
- Liberian Super Cup: 0
