= Saint Joseph Warriors FC =

Liberian football club

- Full name: Saint Joseph Warriors Football Club
- Founded: 1967
- Ground: D. Tweh Sports Pitch, New Kru Town, Monrovia, Liberia

Saint Joseph Warriors Football Club is based in New Kru Town, Monrovia Liberia. The team was established in 1967 by Revd. Brother Joseph Merino.

== Achievements ==
- Liberian Premier League: 3

1976, 1978, 1979

- Liberian Cup: 2

1982, 2007
