= FC Fassell =

Association football club in Liberia

- Full name: Football Club Fassell
- Nickname: Soccer Missionaries
- Founded: 2009
- President: Cassell Anthony Kuoh
- Manager: Fabio Lopez
- League: Liberian First Division
- 2024/25: 1 of 14
Home colours

Football Club Fassell is a football club based in Monrovia, Liberia. In 2014, the team won the Liberian Cup. The club won its first domestic league title within the Liberian First Division during the 2024-2025 league season.

== Honors ==
LFA Super Cup

- Winners (1): 2025

Liberian First Division

- Winners(1): 2025

Liberian Cup

- Winners(1): 2014
