= Liberian Second Division =

Liberian Second Division League
- Country: Liberia
- Confederation: CAF
- Number of clubs: 18
- Level on pyramid: 2
- Promotion to: First Division
- Relegation to: LFA Sub-Committee League (3rd Division)
- Domestic cup: LFA Cup
- Current champions: Cece United (1st title) (2021–22)
- Website: LFA National Leagues

The Liberian Second Division League is the second tier of Liberian football.

== Structure ==
At present, there are eighteen clubs that compete in the Liberian Second Division League. Those eighteen clubs are divided into two zones of ten teams (Zone A) and eight teams (Zone B) playing each other in a home and away series within their respective zones. At the end of the season, the bottom four teams from Zone A and the bottom three teams from Zone B are relegated to the LFA Sub-Committee Leagues (3rd Division). The top team from each zones gain automatic promotion. However, teams positioned second in each zones take part in a promotion play-off. All teams in the Liberian Second Division League take part in the Liberian FA Cup.

== 2013–14 season ==
Zone	Club	Town
B	72nd FC	Paynesville
A	Aries FC	Monrovia
A	BYC II	Monrovia
A	Darius FC	Monrovia
A	ELWA United	Paynesville
B	FC Fassell	Monrovia
A	Gardnersville FC	Gardnersville
B	Gedeh Amabassadors	Zwedru
A	Gedi & Sons FC	Monrovia
A	Georgia FC	New Georgia
A	Holder FC	Monrovia
B	Mighty Barrolle	Buchanan
A	Muscat FC	Paynesville
A	New Hope FC	Kakata
A	Nimba United	Ganta
A	Sime Darby FC	Robertsport
A	Small Town FC	Harbel
A	Super Rollers FC	Monrovia

== Previous champions ==
- 2013–14: FC Fassell (Monrovia)
- 2021–22: Cece United (Monrovia)
