= Barrack Young Controllers FC =

Liberian football club

Barrack Young Controllers
- Full name: Barrack Young Controllers Football Club
- Nickname(s): The Blues
- Founded: 1997; 28 years ago
- Ground: The Blue Field, Monrovia, Liberia
- Capacity: 3,500
- Chairman: Ewan Kpehe
- Manager: John Kormah
- League: Liberian Premier League
- 2018: 1st
- Website: http://www.bycfootball.org

Barrack Young Controllers Football Club is a professional football club based in Monrovia, Liberia. Founded in 1997, the club competes in the Liberian Premier League.

== Achievements ==
- Liberian Premier League
  - Champions (4): 2013, 2014, 2016, 2018
- Liberian Cup
  - Winners (4): 2009, 2012 (reserve side), 2013, 2015 (reserve side)
- Liberian Super Cup
  - Winners (4): 2010, 2013, 2015, 2015–16 (reserve side)
