= Antoinette Tubman Stadium =

Stadium in Liberia

Coordinates: 6°18′31″N 10°48′17″W

- ATS, ATS Stadium
- Interactive map of Antoinette Tubman Stadium
- Location: Monrovia, Liberia
- Capacity: 10,000
- Surface: Artificial turf

Construction
- Opened: 1952
- Renovated: 2022

Tenant
- Liberia national football team

The Antoinette Tubman Stadium (frequently abbreviated ATS Stadium) is a multi-purpose stadium located in Monrovia, Liberia. It is used mostly for football matches although it has also been used for music concerts, major church events, political rallies and Ebola treatment. It has a capacity of 10,000 spectators and is the oldest stadium in Liberia.

== Background ==
Before being constructed, in its location situated at the junction of the United Nations Drive and Lynch Street, a sports pitch with a dilapidated wooden shelter, previously used by sports fans for recreational purposes, already existed. Therefore, no later than 1952, then president William Tubman built in the same spot a stadium and named it after his wife Mrs. Antoinette Tubman.

Being the only stadium for many years until the 1980s, that is before Samuel Kanyon Doe Sports Stadium was completed, Antoinette Tubman Stadium hosted and still hosts numerous home games of the LFA-First Division clubs but also matches of the Liberian national football team such as qualifiers for the 1968, 1976, 2013, 2015 and 2017 African Cup of Nations or qualifiers for the 1982, 2006, 2014 and 2018 FIFA World Cup tournaments and many other contests as well.

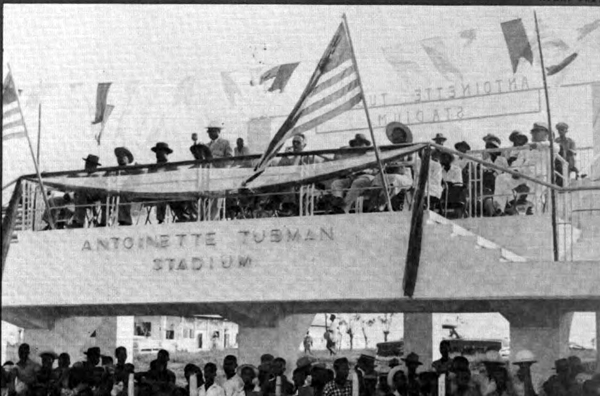
Sections of Antoinette Tubman stadium showing interested spectators watching contests - 1954.

Antoinette Tubman Stadium has been the site of various True Whig Party conventions, especially during the presidency of William Tubman, as well as other major political events and rallies most recently being the "One-Million-Man March" rally organised by the Congress for Democratic Change and president George Weah marking his renomination to race in the 2023 presidential and legislative elections.

Antoinette Tubman Stadium has also been known to be utilized as a venue for several concerts and music festivals performed by mostly afrobeats, afropop and hip-hop artists and bands like Wizkid, Davido or Kcee etc.

Also major church days and religious events are frequently held on Antoinette Tubman Stadium like the commemoration of 500 years of Reformation organized by the Lutheran Church in Liberia (LCL) in 2017 or Liberian Muslims gathering and performing Eid al-Adha prayers in 2018.

In 2014 during the Ebola virus epidemic Antoinette Tubman Stadium was converted into an Ebola treatment unit.

== Renovations ==
Antoinette Tubman Stadium is equipped with an artificial grass surface since 2001, the artificial allweather pitch being financially funded by FIFA through their "Goal programme". In 2022 the stadium was refurbished again with the financial support from FIFA, this time LFA being entitled to "FIFA Forward Programme" funds for the 2019-2022 cycle. The renovation project included the re-roofing of the ATS stadium, the installation of a new electronic board, new floodlights system and complete restoration of the LFA headquarters in the SKD Boulevard community.

== See also ==
- Ebola virus epidemic in Liberia
