= National Port Authority Anchors =

Liberian football club

NPA Anchors
- Full name: National Port Authority Anchors
- Ground: Antonette Tubman Stadium; Monrovia, Liberia
- Capacity: 10,000
- Chairman: (Liberia) Roosevelt R. Doe
- Manager: (Liberia) Darlington Boye
- League: LFA Second Division
- 2025–26: LFA Second Division, 4th of 14

National Port Authority Anchors is a club based in Monrovia, Liberia. Their home Stadium is the Antonette Tubman Stadium.

== Achievements ==
- Liberian Premier League: 1

1994

- Liberian Cup: 2

1992, 2006

== Performance in CAF competitions ==
- African Cup of Champions Clubs: 1 appearance

1995 – First Round

- CAF Confederation Cup: 1 appearance

2007 – Preliminary Round

- CAF Cup Winners' Cup: 1 appearance

1993 – disqualified in First Round

== Current squad ==
Note: Flags indicate national team as defined under FIFA eligibility rules; some limited exceptions apply. Players may hold more than one non-FIFA nationality.

No.	Pos.	Nation	Player
—	FW	LBR	Melvin George
—		LBR	Jackson Cooper
—		LBR	Isaac Cole
—		LBR	Alfred Jayan
—		LBR	Jacob Blamo

No.	Pos.	Nation	Player
—		LBR	Jasper Kun
—		LBR	Ezekiel Doe
—		LBR	Blamo Swen
—		LBR	Morris Tarr
—		LBR	Vitalis Sieh
