= Monrovia Club Breweries =

Liberian football club

- Full name: Monrovia Club Breweries
- Ground: Antonette Tubman Stadium; Monrovia, Liberia
- Capacity: 10,000
- Chairman: Daniel Kanneh
- Manager: Roger Suah
- League: LFA Second Division
- 2021–22: LFA First Division, 9th of 12 (relegated)

Monrovia Club Breweries is an association football club based in Monrovia, Liberia.

== History ==
Their home stadium is the Antonette Tubman Stadium. They have never won the Liberian Premier League in their History. The club is named after the sponsorship Monrovia Breweries organizations.

== Achievements ==
- Liberian Cup: 3

1994, 2016, 2021.

- Liberian Super Cup: 1

2016.
