= Watanga FC =

Liberian football club

- Full name: Watanga Football Club
- Nickname: Watanga FC
- Founded: December 24, 1997
- Ground: SKD Practice Pitch
- Capacity: 2,000
- Chairman: Aaron Jallah
- Manager: Eric Diabatteh
- League: Liberian First Division
- 2025–26: Champions of 14
Home colors	Away colors	Third colors

Watanga Football Club is a Liberian association football club founded on December 24, 1997. The club was named after the military camp established just outside Monrovia by former members of the rebel movement at the end of the First Liberian Civil War in 1996. The club won the national championship in 2022 and was a finalist for the 2012 LFA Cup. The SKD Practice Pitch is their home venue. Watanga FC played home games at the stadium in front of capacity crowds of 2,000.

== Honours ==
Liberian First Division

- Champions (3): 2021–22, 2023–24, 2025–26

== Recent seasons ==
Championship
Season	Level	League	Place	Reference
2020–2021	1.	Liberian First Division	4.	
2021–2022	1.	Liberian First Division	1.	
2022–2023	1.	Liberian First Division	3.	
2023–2024	1.	Liberian First Division	1.	
2024–2025	1.	Liberian First Division	3.	
2025–2026	1.	Liberian First Division	1.	

== Current squad ==
Note: Flags indicate national team as defined under FIFA eligibility rules; some limited exceptions apply. Players may hold more than one non-FIFA nationality.

No.	Pos.	Nation	Player
28	GK	LBR	Stephen Kanneh
1	GK	LBR	James Swaray
30	GK	LBR	Anthony Kpoto
20	MF	LBR	Evans Kamara
25	FW	LBR	Christopher Mulbah
5	DF	LBR	Lazarus Suah
14	FW	LBR	Samson Kromah
24	DF	LBR	Andrew Gono (On loan from Real Muja Football Club)
9	FW	LBR	William Gbollie (On loan from Real Muja Football Club)
21	MF	LBR	Francis Sackor
23	MF	LBR	Leopold Tamba (On loan from FC Garou)
26	DF	LBR	Harold Sheriff
—	DF	LBR	Lewis Gbaa
12	DF	LBR	Craig Yarkpawolo
19	DF	LBR	Barnabas Toe

No.	Pos.	Nation	Player
17	MF	LBR	Steve Koffa
27	MF	LBR	Justin Togbah (on loan from Accra Great Olympics F.C.)
7	MF	LBR	Marlon Yormie (Captain)
16	MF	LBR	Kyle Kormah
—	MF	LBR	Henry Swen
11	FW	LBR	Donald Yarkpah
18	FW	LBR	Dennis Kpadeh
15	DF	LBR	John Zazay
6	DF	LBR	Joshua Flomo
4	DF	LBR	Jimmy Gbanjah
14	FW	LBR	Harold Jallah
13	MF	LBR	Stuart Wesseh
10	FW	LBR	Thomas Chweh
8	FW	LBR	Christian Jabateh
23	DF	LBR	Kevin Tugbe

== Technical staff ==
- Gekor Theophilus- Head Coach = (Liberia)
- William Zogbo - Deputy Coach = (Liberia)
- Edward Gweh - Fitness Trainer = (Liberia)
- Victor Kpadeh - Goalkeeper Trainer (Liberia)
- Randall Gbassagee - Statistician (Liberia)
- Timothy Kpoto - Masseur = (Liberia)
- Phillip Gbollie - Medic = (Liberia)
- Donald Gbawor - Kit Man -1 (Liberia)
- Justin Togba - Kit Man -2 (Liberia)
- Richard Yeanay - Administrative Manager = (Liberia)

== Famous players ==
- (Afghanistan) Mohammad Naeem Rahimi

== Managers ==
- (Liberia) Cooper Sannah
- (Liberia)
