= Monrovia Black Star FC =

Liberian football club

Black Star
- Full name: Monrovia Black Star Football Club
- Founded: March 15, 1980; 45 years ago
- Ground: Antonette Tubman Stadium; Monrovia, Liberia
- Capacity: 10,000
- Chairman: Alvin Wright
- Coach: Amos Smith
- League: Liberian Premier League

Monrovia Black Star FC is a football club based in Monrovia, Liberia. Its home stadium is the Antonette Tubman Stadium. In 2008, the club won the Liberian Premier League (LPL) and Liberian Cup for the first time in its history.

== History ==
- 1980 – 4th Division
- 1981 – 4th Division
- 1982 – 4th Division
- 1983 – 3rd Division
- 1984 – 3rd Division
- 1985 – 2nd Division
- 1986 – 2nd Division
- 1987 – 2nd Division
- 1988 – 1st Division
- 1989 – 1st Division
- 1990 – 1st Division
- 1991 – 1st Division
- 1992 – 1st Division
- 1993 – Premier League
- 1998 – 1st Division
- 1999 – Premier League
- 2000 – Premier League
- 2001 – Premier League
- 2002 – Premier League
- 2003 – 1st Division
- 2004 – 1st Division
- 2005 – 1st Division
- 2006 – Premier League
- 2007 – Premier League
- 2008 – Premier League
- 2009 – Premier League
- 2010–11 – Premier League

== Achievements ==
- Liberian Premier League: 1

2008

- Liberian Cup: 1

2008

== Performance in CAF competitions ==
- CAF Champions League: 1 appearance

2009: Preliminary Round

- CAF Confederation Cup: 1 appearance

2008 – Preliminary Round

== Players ==
As of 26 February 2008.
