= Invincible Eleven =

Association football club in Liberia

- Full name: Union of Invincible Eleven & Majestic Sports Association Inc.
- Nicknames: I.E.; The Yellow Boys
- Founded: 1943; 83 years ago
- Ground: Antoinette Tubman Stadium; Monrovia, Liberia
- Capacity: 10,000
- Chairman: John Smythe, Willard Russell, and Thomas O’dea
- Manager: Mustapha Kennedy
- League: Liberian Second Division
- 2025–26: 7th of 16
Home colours

Union of Invincible Eleven & Majestic Sports Association Inc., also known as Invincible Eleven (I.E.), is a Liberian football club based in Monrovia. They are Liberia's oldest club, and they play in the Liberian Second Division after suffering relegation in 2025. Their home stadium is the Antoinette Tubman Stadium. Invincible Eleven is one of Liberia's most popular and historic clubs, along with Mighty Barrolle. Ballon D'or winner George Weah, Liberia's most famous footballer and former president, scored 24 goals in 23 games during a spell at the club in the 1986–87 season.

== History ==
=== Formation ===
Invincible Eleven, also known as I.E., traces its origin from Iron United, based in Clay-Ashland, and Bombers, based in Monrovia. These teams were composed of young players between the ages of 13 and 20, mostly students from the College of West Africa (CWA), St. Patrick's High School, and Liberia College. Both Iron United and Bombers were active between 1940 and 1942.

The young players of the two teams - especially students of CWA - established teamwork and an amicable relationship. They decided to pool their resources and form a single team, strong enough to compete favorably with the older and more experienced teams like the Olympics and Bame Monrovia. A meeting with this agenda was summoned at the residence of Joseph G. Richards's mother on Broad Street in May 1943. At this meeting, the formation of the team was unanimously agreed upon.

After tossing around several ideas for naming a football team, the name Invincible Eleven was agreed upon. Those who attended that May 1943 meeting during which IE was formed included John Coleman (deceased), G. Aaron Grimes, Hugh Collins, Sammy Hodge, Lawrence Morgan, Austin Coleman, George Marshall, Othello Coleman, Zulu Cooper, and Oscar Hemans-Yankey. At that meeting, Joseph G. Richards was elected the first captain of the team.

While most of these young students were attending CWA and the team initially had the backing of the faculty of the institution, they were not the CWA team; among the members were students from Liberia College and St. Patrick's High School. Though it is true that most of the original members of the team were Americo-Liberians or Congos by virtue of their easy access to formal education at that time, there were also students who were from the Kru, Bassa and Grebo ethnic backgrounds. For instance, Edmund Johnson, Robert Sherman, Tugbeh Anderson, and Prince N. A. Brown were all Krus. Frank George, Aaron Grimes, and Argwu, the goalie, were Bassas, while Hugh Collins was Grebo, thus giving the team an academic and broad ethnic base support from the onset.

=== Early Years ===
The following month, June 1943, IE made its debut in football competitions after some weeks of hard practice. The first three years were marked by constant defeats, as the members were young and inexperienced. IE struck its first surprise in 1945, when it trounced "Olympics" 5–0. This victory was crucial in animating the spirit of sportsmanship and teamwork among the boys, for Olympics consisted of older and more experienced boys, mainly from Freetown. It was one of the oldest and leading teams. For seven years afterward Invincible Eleven became the most prestigious club in Liberia, very rarely losing, causing them to be feared by the clubs that would face them.

Between 1946 and 1949 IE sustained a severe blow when seven or eight of its members left about the same time for further studies in the United States and other foreign parts. However, they were replaced subsequently by some promising young players from the junior team, West End Eleven. Some of these young players, who in their own right also came into national prominence included Sam Payne Cooper, Leonard Deshield, T. Ernest Eastman, Bruce Smith, E. Harding Smythe, Gabriel J. Tucker, and John Payne Tucker. Between 1950 and 1951, some of these boys matriculated into schools abroad for further studies, thereby creating another vacuum. Coupled with the lack of support, IE was temporarily renamed "Pepperbird" by its sponsor Mr. Al Schoucair, the owner of the Pepperbird Club. When Joseph G. Richards, one of the original founders of IE returned from abroad in December 1951, he recommended the club return to its original name. It was decided that the club would combine its name with the name of its junior team, Majestics, which is how they got the name they carry today.

=== Founding of the Liberian Premier League and Success Throughout the 60s ===
When the Liberian Premier League was founded in 1956, I.E. were truly able to show their dominance. Though the champions of Liberia were not documented until 1963, it was in the 60s that I.E. won four consecutive Premier League titles. After this period of great success, however, the club would be unable to win another title until 1980, losing their first title to Mighty Barrolle, with whom they have the biggest football rivalry in all of Liberia.

=== Modern Day and Relegation ===
The Invincible Eleven have been largely unsuccessful since their dominance in the 90s, winning their last ever Premier League title in 2007. In April 2019 they were relegated to the Liberian Third Division after failing to pay a fine for not honoring a league match. Since then, they have made it back to the top tier of Liberian football, yet suffered relegation in 2025, putting them in the second division.

== Notable Players ==
The Invincible Eleven have produced several important and talented players, including:

- George Weah - Weah is certainly the most prominent player who played for Invincible Eleven. Having moved over from IE's rivals, Mighty Barrolle, Weah helped IE win the Liberian Premier League in his first and only year at the club, finishing as the top scorer in the entire league. After his time at IE, Weah would go on to win multiple titles across Europe such as Ligue 1, the Coupe de France, and Serie A. Individually, he is the only African player to have won the Ballon D'or, Onze D'or, or FIFA World Player of the Year.
- Joe Nagbe - Nagbe joined the Eleven in 1985 before leaving for club enemies Mighty Barrolle before returning back to the club in 1988 to win the Liberian Premier League. After his time at the club, Nagbe proceeded to win the Coupe de France with OCG Nice.
- George Sackor - George Sackor was born in 1936 in Monrovia. He played for I.E. and captained them when they won their first two Premier League Titles. After his time at I.E., Sackor moved to Mighty Barrolle before beginning a career in America.

== Campaigns ==
=== 1963-66: First Four Consecutive Premier League Titles ===
It was in 1963 that Liberian officials began recording the winners of each Premier League, the same year that Invincible Eleven won their first of a historic run of four consecutive Premier League Titles. Very little information is known about the league from this time, yet it is known that a midfielder named George Sackor played for the club during their first two wins, yet it is uncertain if he played after that. When the club won the Premier League for the 3rd time in 1965, they qualified for the African Cup of Champions, being the first Liberian club to ever do so. The club faced AS Real Bamako in the first round, losing 2-3 at home and 6-0 away, leaving the stage 2-9 on aggregate. The following year, the Eleven won the championship for the fourth time in a row, and therefore qualified for the Cup of Champions a second time. Due to circumstances unknown, they withdrew from the competition in the first round.

=== 1997-1998: 2nd Domestic Treble ===
==== Liberian Premier League ====
Not much is known about the Liberian Premier League at this time, as it was not very well documented and online sources are unavailable. It is known, however, that the Eleven did win during this time, and that because they won both the Premier League and Liberian Cup, the Super Cup was automatically awarded to them, granting them a domestic treble.

==== Liberian Cup ====
In the 1998 Liberian Cup, the final was contested by Invincible Eleven and Junior Professionals in two legs, where Junior led 2-1 at home while Invincible scored to make it 1-0 in the second leg. Because the Eleven scored one away goal and Junior scored none, Invincible Eleven ended up taking home the trophy on aggregate.

=== 1998-1999: 3rd Domestic Treble ===
==== Liberian Premier League ====
During this season's Premier League, nine teams participated, with the Invincible Eleven coming out on top for the second time in a row.

==== Liberian Cup and FA Social Cup Tourney ====
For the second consecutive year in a row, the Eleven won the Liberian Cup and Domestic Cup, giving them their third domestic treble. This year, however smaller tournament was also held known as the FA Social Cup Tourney, which composed of three teams: Invincible Eleven, LPRC Oilers, and Mighty Barrolle. In this contest, each team played each other team once. In the contest between Oilers and Invincible, Oilers won 3-1. In the match between Barrolle and Oilers, a tie occurred. As for the final game, the score was not recorded, yet it was recorded that Oilers won the competition.

== Kit ==
The Invincible Eleven have had a variety of different home and away kits throughout the years, yet they have mostly stayed true to their classic yellow kit, earning them the nickname "The Yellow Boys." The I.E. offered replica's of their home kit for $20 in 2025 in order to create income for the financially struggling club.

2022 Home Kit	2025 Home Kit

== Honors ==
- Liberian Premier League
  - Champions (13): 1963, 1964, 1965, 1966, 1980, 1981, 1983, 1984, 1985, 1987, 1997, 1998, 2007
- Liberian Cup
  - Winners (5): 1987, 1991, 1997, 1998, 2011

== Performance in CAF competitions ==
- CAF Champions League: 2 appearances

1999 – Withdrew in Preliminary Round
2008 – Withdrew in Preliminary Round

- African Cup of Champions Clubs: 7 appearances

1967 – First Round
1981 – First Round
1982 – Second Round
1984 – Preliminary round
1985 – disqualified in First Round
1986 – First Round
1988 – First Round

- CAF Confederation Cup: 1 appearance

2012 – First Round

- CAF Cup Winners' Cup: 1 appearance

1992 – First Round

== Performance in CAF competitions ==
Season	Competition	Round	Club	Home	Away	Aggregate
1966	African Cup of Champions Clubs	First Round	(Mali) AS Real Bamako	2–3	0–6	2–9
1967	African Cup of Champions Clubs	First Round	(Mali) Djoliba AC	—	—	Withdrew
1982	African Cup of Champions Clubs	First Round	(Nigeria) IICC Shooting Stars	0–0	0–2	0–2
1982	African Cup of Champions Clubs	Second Round	(Cameroon) Canon Yaoundé	0–0	0–3	0–3
1985	African Cup of Champions Clubs	First Round	(Mali) Stade Malien	3–0	1–1	4–1 (Disqualified)
1988	African Cup of Champions Clubs	Preliminary Round	(Mauritania) ASC Garde Nationale	0–0	1–1	1–1 (Away Goal)
1992	CAF Cup Winners' Cup	First Round	(Ghana) Great Olympics	0-2	1-0	1-2
1999	CAF Champions League	Preliminary Round	(Senegal) ASC Ndiambour	—	0–4	Withdrew
2008	CAF Champions League	Preliminary Round	(Guinea) AS Kaloum Star	—	—	Withdrew
2012	CAF Confederation Cup	Preliminary Round	(Guinea-Bissau) Desportivo de Mansabá	—	—	Opponent Withdrew
2012	CAF Confederation Cup	First Round	(Morocco) Wydad AC	0-2	1-4	1-6

== See Also ==
- George Weah
- Liberian Premier League
- Liberian Cup
- Mighty Barrolle
