= LFA First Division =

LFA- Orange First Division
- Founded: 1956; 70 years ago
- Country: Liberia
- Confederation: CAF
- Number of clubs: 14
- Level on pyramid: 1
- Relegation to: LFA- Orange Second Division
- Domestic cup: Petro Trade Cup
- International cup(s): Champions League; Confederation Cup
- Current champions: Watanga FC (2025–26)
- Most championships: Mighty Barrolle (13 titles); Invincible Eleven (13 titles)
- Website: liberiafa.com (archived)
- Current: 2025–26 LFA First Division

The Liberian First Division, officially known as Orange First Division for sponsorship reasons, is the highest division of football in Liberia. The first division league began in 1956 and has only once been won by a club outside Monrovia. It has been dominated by Mighty Barrolle FC and Invincible Eleven FC. The league is organized by the Liberia Football Association. In 2010, the league became known as the Orange Premier League for sponsorship reasons and it is now called LFA-Orange First Division League.

== Sponsorship ==
In March 2010, Cellcom GSM, a telecommunications corporation in Liberia and Guinea contracted a three-year sponsorship deal with the League until the end of the 2012–13 season.

In October 2013, Cellcom GSM and the Liberia Football Association extended their deal to another three years until the end of the 2015–16 season.

== Clubs ==
Note: Table lists in alphabetical order.

2024–25 Club	Location	Founded	2023–24 Position
FC Bea Mountain	Robertsport	2014	2nd
Black Man Warrior	Monrovia	2020	1st (SD)
Discoveries SA	Gardnersville	2017	3rd (SD)
Freeport FC	Monrovia	2011	11th
Global Pharma	Monrovia	2022	7th
Heaven Eleven	Yekepa	2011	5th
Invincible Eleven	Monrovia	1943	9th
FC Kallon-Liberia	Paynesville	2002	10th
LISCR FC	Monrovia	1995	3rd
LPRC Oilers	Monrovia	1975	8th
Mighty Barrolle	Monrovia	1956	4th
Paynesville FC	Paynesville	2013	6th
Shaita FC	Careysburg	2017	2nd (SD)
Watanga FC	Paynesville	1997	1st

== Previous champions ==
Years	Champions
1956–1962	Unknown
1963	Invincible Eleven (1)
1964	Invincible Eleven (2)
1965	Invincible Eleven (3)
1966	Invincible Eleven (4)
1967	Mighty Barrolle (1)
1968	Not held
1969	Not finished
1970	Not held
1971	Not held
1972	Mighty Barrolle (2)
1973	Mighty Barrolle (3)
1974	Mighty Barrolle (4)
1975	Not held
1976	Saint Joseph Warriors (1)
1977	Not held
1978	Saint Joseph Warriors (2)
1979	Saint Joseph Warriors (3)
1980	Invincible Eleven (5)
1981	Invincible Eleven (6)
1982	Not held
1983	Invincible Eleven (7)
1984	Invincible Eleven (8)
1985	Invincible Eleven (9)
1986	Mighty Barrolle (5)
1987	Invincible Eleven (10)
1988	Mighty Barrolle (6)
1989	Mighty Barrolle (7)
1990	Not held
1991	LPRC Oilers (1)
1992	LPRC Oilers (2)
1993	Mighty Barrolle (8)
1994	NPA Anchors (1)
1995	Mighty Barrolle (9)
1996	Junior Professional (1)
1997	Invincible Eleven (11)
1998	Invincible Eleven (12)
1999	LPRC Oilers (3)
2000–01	Mighty Barrolle (10)
2002	LPRC Oilers (4)
2003	Not finished due to civil war
2004	Mighty Barrolle (11)
2005	LPRC Oilers (5)
2006	Mighty Barrolle (12)
2007	Invincible Eleven (13)
2008	Monrovia Black Star (1)
2009	Mighty Barrolle (13)
2010–11	LISCR (1)
2012	LISCR (2)
2012–13	Barrack Young Controllers (1)
2013–14	Barrack Young Controllers (2)
2015	Nimba United (1)
2016	Barrack Young Controllers (3)
2016–17	LISCR (3)
2018	Barrack Young Controllers (4)
2019	LPRC Oilers (6)
2019–20	Not finished due to COVID-19
2020–21	LPRC Oilers (7)
2021–22	Watanga (1)
2022–23	LISCR (4)
2023–24	Watanga (2)
2024–25	FC Fassell (1)
2025–26	Watanga (3)

== Performance By Club ==
Club	City	Titles	Last title
Mighty Barrolle	Monrovia	13	2009
Invincible Eleven	Monrovia	13	2007
LPRC Oilers	Monrovia	7	2021
Barrack Young Controllers	Monrovia	4	2018
LISCR	Monrovia	4	2023
Saint Joseph Warriors	Monrovia	3	1979
Watanga FC	Monrovia	3	2026
NPA Anchors	Monrovia	1	1994
Junior Professional	Monrovia	1	1996
Black Star	Monrovia	1	2008
Nimba United	Sanniquellie	1	2015
FC Fassell	Monrovia	1	2025

== Top goalscorers ==
Year	Country	Best scorers	Team	Goals
1993		Mariconino	LISCR	23
2011–12		Dominic Jelateh	Fatu	20
2012–13	(Liberia)	Mohammed Varney	LISCR	15
2018	(Liberia)	Trokon Myers	BYC	9
2020–21	(Liberia)	Augustine Otu	Watanga	22
2021–22		Prince Sawoh	Nimba United	14
2022–23	(Liberia)	Christopher Jackson	LISCR	22
2023–24	(Liberia)	Clement Zubah	Mighty Barrolle	23

== See also ==
- Liberia national football team
