= LISCR FC =

Liberian football club

- Full name: Liberian International Shipping & Corporate Registry; Football Club
- Nickname: Shipping Boys
- Founded: August 1995; 30 years ago
- Ground: Antoinette Tubman Stadium; Monrovia, Liberia
- Capacity: 10,000
- Manager: Andrew Kpoh
- League: Liberian First Division
- 2025–26: 5th of 14

Liberian International Shipping & Corporate Registry FC, abbreviated to LISCR FC, is a football (soccer) club from Liberia based in Gardnersville, Montserrado County. They play their home matches at the Antoinette Tubman Stadium in central Monrovia. They have won the Liberia Football Association Knockout three times and the Liberia Super Cup trophy twice. They won the premiership title for the first time in their history in the 2010–11 season and retained the title the following season (2011–12). LISCR became the last winner of the Liberian Premier League before the dissolution of the league to the first division by the Liberia Football Association. After five years of the dissolution of the Premiership, they won the new first division for the first time in 2017 after finishing top of the 2016–17 Liberia First Division League table with an unbeaten record.

== Early history ==
The club was formed on August 24, 1995, as Young Barcelona by its president, Mustapha I. Raji. Its first appearance in Liberian football was in the Gardnersville Sub-committee. It ended the 1995–96 season as the champions of the 4th division and qualified for the 3rd division of the Gardnersville sub-committee league. In 1997 the club emerged as champions of the 3rd division but failed in the process to qualify for the Division 2 category the following season. The club continued with its campaign in getting to the 2nd division as crowned champions of the 3rd division in 1998.

The team earned a well-deserved position in Liberian football after winning the Liberia Football Association 2nd division championship in 1999 and gained promotion to the 1st division and later got promotion to Liberia Football Association Premier League in 2000.

== Premier League and First Division ==
As a club in the Liberian Premier League, LISCR FC won its first trophy in 2004 when they won the Liberian FA Cup. The following year, 2005, the team won its second Liberian FA Cup trophy. Six years after winning its second Liberian FA Cup, LISCR won the 2010–11 Liberian Premiership and represented Liberia in the 2012 CAF Champions League where they were knocked out by Ghanaian club, Berekum Chelsea in the preliminary round. They won their second premiership title the following season (2011–12) and again represented Liberia in the 2013 CAF Champions League. They were drawn against Union Douala of Cameroon. Again, the club was knocked out in the preliminary round by Cameroonian side as they failed to reach the first round qualifiers.

Before the start of the 2016–17 season, the club signed Gambian coach Mustapha Manneh who led the club to an unbeaten league run. The club won the new First Division title in style as they finish the 2016–17 First Division League unbeaten, becoming the first and only Liberian club to win the league unbeaten. From 22 matches, the team was able to obtain 10 wins and 12 draws as they ended the league season with 42 points. The 2016–17 season turned out to be the best in the club's history by winning both the league and the FA Cup.

== Unbeaten league run ==
The club became the first and only club in Liberia to win the top-flight league and any league without conceding defeat. They won the 2016–17 Liberia First Division with an unbeaten record in 22 matches. The club managed 10 wins and 12 draws to complete the league season without defeat.

== Achievements ==
- Liberian Premier League / First Division: 4

2011, 2012, 2017, 2023

- LFA Cup: 5

2004, 2005, 2017, 2019, 2022, 2023

- Super Cup: 5

2004, 2011, 2018, 2022, 2023

== Performance in CAF competitions ==
- CAF Champions League: 3 appearances

2012 – Preliminary Round
2013 – Preliminary Round
2018 - Preliminary Round

- CAF Cup: 1 appearance

2003 – Withdrew in First Round

== Current squad ==
As of 16 August 2023

Note: Flags indicate national team as defined under FIFA eligibility rules; some limited exceptions apply. Players may hold more than one non-FIFA nationality.

No.	Pos.	Nation	Player
25	GK	LBR	Ashley Williams
12	DF	LBR	Sabastien Teclar
26	DF	LBR	Rodney Gbanjah
—	MF	LBR	Musa Koulibaly
10	MF	LBR	Sheku Sheriff
13	FW	LBR	Lassana Kamara
14	DF	LBR	Marlon Harrison
7	FW	LBR	Mark Karlay
17	MF	LBR	Fredrick Jarbah
18	GK	LBR	Tommy Songo (Captain)
—	FW	LBR	Saviour Brown (on loan from Gardnersville FC)
20	DF	LBR	Darius Kah
6	MF	LBR	Christopher Sergbeh
23	DF	LBR	Prince Bono
27	FW	LBR	Stephen Jabateh

No.	Pos.	Nation	Player
5	DF	LBR	John Mulbah
21	MF	LBR	Maliki Kromah
11	FW	LBR	Albert Karlon
1	GK	LBR	Juanito Sayeh
2	MF	LBR	Joe Bloe
22	MF	LBR	Benjamin Doe
24	MF	LBR	Fallah Johnson Jr.
9	FW	LBR	Stewart Jallah
—	DF	LBR	Harry Boakai
28	FW	LBR	Daniel Toe
3	DF	LBR	Michael Temeh
19	FW	LBR	Aflah Allison
17	FW	LBR	Christopher Jackson
4	DF	LBR	Abel Kpassawah

== Current technical staff ==
Position	Staff
First team Head Coach	Theophilus Geekor
Deputy Coach	Mohammed Sheriff
Goalkeeping Coach	Jerry Bing
Physical Trainer	Emmanuel Tarpeh
Team Doctor	Boakai Kamra
Team Doctor	James Nagbe
Team Manager	Zayzay Kollie
Kit Man	Samson Mendy
Deputy Kit Man	
Massuer	.

== Administrative staff ==
- Club President: Benjamin Solanke
- Vice President:
- Secretary General: Swen Bedell
- Public Relations Officer: Thomas Wedraogoh
