= LPRC Oilers =

Liberian football club

- Full name: Liberia Petroleum Refining Company Oilers Sport Association
- Nicknames: The Oilers; The Oil Boys
- Ground: Liberia Petroleum Refining Company; Monrovia, Liberia
- Capacity: 2,500
- Chairman: Momolu John Dukuly
- Manager: James Jappah
- League: Liberian First Division
- 2025–26: 4th of 14
Home colours	Away colours

LPRC Oilers is a football club from Liberia based in Monrovia. Their home stadium is the Liberia Petroleum Refining Company. The LPRC Oilers have been a fixture in Liberian football since the late 1980s.

== Achievements ==
- Liberian Premier League: 7

1991, 1992, 1999, 2002, 2005, 2019, 2021.

- Liberian Cup: 6

1988, 1989, 1993, 1999, 2000, 2005.

- Liberian Super Cup: 1

2002.

- President Cup: 2

2015, 2019.

== Performance in CAF competitions ==
- CAF Champions League: 3 appearances

2006 – Preliminary Round
2020 – Preliminary Round
2022 –

- African Cup of Champions Clubs: 2 appearances

1992: Preliminary Round
1993: First Round

- CAF Cup Winners' Cup: 5 appearances

1987 – First Round
1989 – Quarter-finals
1990 – First Round
1994 – Second Round
1999 – First Round
2019 – First Round
