= Mighty Barrolle =

Association football club in Liberia

- Full name: Mighty Barrolle Sports Association
- Nicknames: The Rollers; The Red Boys, Kanyan Pepper
- Founded: 1964; 62 years ago
- Ground: Doris Williams Stadium; Buchanan, Liberia
- Capacity: 3,000
- Chairman: Ronald Koffa
- Manager: Anthony Jabateh
- League: LFA Second Division
- 2025–26: 12th of 16
Home colors

Mighty Barrolle is a football club from Liberia based in Monrovia. They are one of the founding members of football in Liberia. Their home Stadium is the Doris Williams Stadium. Liberia's most famous footballer, George Weah, began his career at Mighty Barolle, scoring 7 goals in 10 games in the 1985–86 season. Mighty Barrolle, commonly called "the Rollers", were promoted back to the First Division in 2016 after a successful campaign in Division 2.

== Achievements ==
- Liberian Premier League
  - Championship (13): 1967, 1972, 1973, 1974, 1986, 1988, 1989, 1993, 1995, 2000–01, 2004, 2006, 2009
- Liberian Cup
  - Winners (8): 1974, 1978, 1981, 1983, 1984, 1985, 1986, 1995

== Performance in CAF competitions ==
- CAF Champions League: 2 appearances

2007 – Preliminary Round
2011 – Preliminary Round

- CAF Confederation Cup: 1 appearance

2009 – Preliminary Round

- African Cup of Champions Clubs: 8 appearances

1968: disqualified in First Round
1973: First Round
1974: First Round
1987: Second Round
1989: First Round
1990: First Round
1994: withdrew in First Round
1996: withdrew in Third Round Note: Due to Civil War

- CAF Cup: 1 appearance

1997 – disqualified in First Round

- CAF Cup Winners' Cup: 6 appearances

1975 – First Round
1982 – First Round
1984 – First Round
1985 – First Round
1986 – Second Round
1988 – First Round

== Current squad ==
Note: Flags indicate national team as defined under FIFA eligibility rules; some limited exceptions apply. Players may hold more than one non-FIFA nationality.

No.	Pos.	Nation	Player
1	GK	LBR	Morlick Keita
2	MF	LBR	Stephen Nagbe
5	DF	LBR	Julius Yarkpawolo (Captain)
7	FW	LBR	Donald Kromah
8	MF	LBR	David Gbotoe
10	MF	LBR	Prince Garwo
11	FW	LBR	Clement Zubah
12	FW	LBR	Isaac Nyonno
14	FW	LBR	Phillip Kollie
16	GK	LBR	Timothy Suah
17	DF	LBR	Ernest Sackor
18	DF	LBR	William Gbanjah
20	MF	LBR	Samuel Chweh

No.	Pos.	Nation	Player
21	DF	LBR	Rodney Wesseh
22	DF	LBR	Ignatius Mulbah
23	DF	LBR	Patrick Nyei
24	DF	LBR	Robert Gbaa
25	GK	LBR	Jack Zogbaye
26	MF	LBR	Graham Gaye
27	DF	LBR	Stephen Vah
28	MF	LBR	Herbert Jabateh
29	FW	LBR	Edward Alexander
30	FW	LBR	Rohan Wolo
31	FW	LBR	Thomas Tamba
32	FW	LBR	Francis Koffa
36	DF	LBR	Clarence Slocum
