= 2017 CAF Champions League qualifying rounds =

- Dates: 10 February – 19 March 2017

The 2017 CAF Champions League qualifying rounds were played from 10 February to 19 March 2017. A total of 55 teams competed in the qualifying rounds to decide the 16 places in the group stage of the 2017 CAF Champions League.

== Draw ==
The draw for the preliminary round and first round was held on 21 December 2016 at the CAF headquarters in Cairo, Egypt.

The entry round of the 55 teams entered into the draw was determined by their performances in the CAF competitions for the previous five seasons (CAF 5-year ranking points shown in parentheses).

Entry round	First round (9 teams)	Preliminary round (46 teams)
Teams	(Democratic Republic of the Congo) TP Mazembe (58 pts); (Egypt) Al Ahly (45 pts); (Egypt) Zamalek (36 pts); (Tunisia) Étoile du Sahel (31 pts); (South Africa) Mamelodi Sundowns (25 pts); (Tunisia) Espérance de Tunis (20 pts); (Sudan) Al-Hilal (20 pts); (Algeria) USM Alger (16 pts); (Morocco) Wydad AC (16 pts)	(Republic of the Congo) AC Léopards (16 pts); (Sudan) Al-Merrikh (14 pts); (Ivory Coast) Séwé Sport (13 pts); (Democratic Republic of the Congo) AS Vita Club (12 pts); (Morocco) FUS Rabat (12 pts); (Cameroon) Coton Sport (12 pts); (Mali) Stade Malien (9 pts); (Libya) Al-Ahli Tripoli (5 pts); (Tanzania) Young Africans (5 pts); (Mali) AS Real Bamako (3 pts); (Ethiopia) Saint George (2 pts); (Algeria) JS Saoura; (South Africa) Bidvest Wits; (Republic of the Congo) Diables Noirs; (Ivory Coast) AS Tanda; (Cameroon) UMS de Loum; (Nigeria) Enugu Rangers; (Nigeria) Rivers United; (Angola) 1º de Agosto; (Ghana) Wa All Stars; (Zambia) Zanaco; (Botswana) Township Rollers; (Burkina Faso) Rail Club du Kadiogo; (Burundi) Vital'O; (Comoros) Ngaya Club; (Equatorial Guinea) Sony Elá Nguema; (Gabon) CF Mounana; (The Gambia) Gambia Ports Authority; (Guinea) Horoya; (Kenya) Tusker; (Lesotho) Lioli; (Liberia) Barrack Young Controllers; (Madagascar) CNaPS Sport; (Mauritius) AS Port-Louis 2000; (Mozambique) Ferroviário Beira; (Niger) AS FAN; (Réunion) Saint-Louisienne; (Rwanda) APR; (Senegal) US Gorée; (Seychelles) Côte d'Or; (Sierra Leone) Johansen; (South Sudan) Atlabara; (Eswatini) Royal Leopards; (Uganda) KCCA; (Zanzibar) Zimamoto; (Zimbabwe) CAPS United

== Format ==
In the qualifying rounds, each tie was played on a home-and-away two-legged basis. If the aggregate score was tied after the second leg, the away goals rule would be applied, and if still tied, extra time would not be played, and the penalty shoot-out would be used to determine the winner (Regulations III. 13 & 14).

== Schedule ==
The schedule of each round was as follows.

Round	First leg	Second leg
Preliminary round	10–12 February 2017	17–19 February 2017
First round	10–12 March 2017	17–19 March 2017

== Bracket ==
The bracket of the draw was announced by the CAF on 21 December 2016. The 16 winners of the first round advanced to the group stage, while the 16 losers of the first round entered the Confederation Cup play-off round.

Preliminary round
1	(Algeria) USM Alger	Bye
4
3	(Burkina Faso) Rail Club du Kadiogo	3	0	3
2	(Republic of the Congo) Diables Noirs	0	1	1

First round
(Algeria) USM Alger	2	0	2
(Burkina Faso) Rail Club du Kadiogo	0	1	1

Preliminary round
1	(Mali) AS Real Bamako	0	0	0
4	(Nigeria) Rivers United	0	4	4
3	(Equatorial Guinea) Sony Elá Nguema	0	1	1
2	(Sudan) Al-Merrikh	1	4	5

First round
(Nigeria) Rivers United	3	0	3
(Sudan) Al-Merrikh	0	4	4

Preliminary round
1	(Tunisia) Étoile du Sahel	Bye
4
3	(Ivory Coast) AS Tanda	3	1	4
2	(Niger) AS FAN	0	3	3

First round
(Tunisia) Étoile du Sahel	3	2	5
(Ivory Coast) AS Tanda	0	1	1

Preliminary round
1	(Tunisia) Espérance de Tunis	Bye
4
3	(Senegal) US Gorée	0	1	1
2	(Guinea) Horoya	0	2	2

First round
(Tunisia) Espérance de Tunis	3	1	4
(Guinea) Horoya	1	2	3

Preliminary round
1	(Ghana) Wa All Stars	1	0	1
4	(Libya) Al-Ahli Tripoli	3	2	5
3	(Sierra Leone) Johansen	1	0	1
2	(Morocco) FUS Rabat	1	3	4

First round
(Libya) Al-Ahli Tripoli	2	1	3 (a)
(Morocco) FUS Rabat	0	3	3

Preliminary round
1	(South Africa) Mamelodi Sundowns	Bye
4
3	(Uganda) KCCA	1	1	2 (a)
2	(Angola) 1º de Agosto	0	2	2

First round
(South Africa) Mamelodi Sundowns	2	1	3
(Uganda) KCCA	1	1	2

Preliminary round
1	(Morocco) Wydad AC	Bye
4
3	(Gabon) CF Mounana	2	1	3
2	(Burundi) Vital'O	0	0	0

First round
(Morocco) Wydad AC	1	0	1 (5 p)
(Gabon) CF Mounana	0	1	1 (4 p)

Preliminary round
1	(Comoros) Ngaya Club	1	1	2
4	(Tanzania) Young Africans	5	1	6
3	(Zambia) Zanaco	0	1	1
2	(Rwanda) APR	0	0	0

First round
(Tanzania) Young Africans	1	0	1
(Zambia) Zanaco	1	0	1 (a)

Preliminary round
1	(Zanzibar) Zimamoto	2	1	3
4	(Mozambique) Ferroviário Beira	1	3	4
3	(Liberia) Barrack Young Controllers	1	0	1 (7 p)
2	(Mali) Stade Malien	0	1	1 (6 p)

First round
(Mozambique) Ferroviário Beira	2	0	2 (4 p)
(Liberia) Barrack Young Controllers	0	2	2 (1 p)

Preliminary round
1	(Egypt) Zamalek	Bye
4
3	(Algeria) JS Saoura	1	0	1
2	(Nigeria) Enugu Rangers	1	0	1 (a)

First round
(Egypt) Zamalek	4	1	5
(Nigeria) Enugu Rangers	1	2	3

Preliminary round
1	(The Gambia) Gambia Ports Authority	1	0	1
4	(Ivory Coast) Séwé Sport	0	0	0
3	(Eswatini) Royal Leopards	0	1	1
2	(Democratic Republic of the Congo) AS Vita Club	1	3	4

First round
(The Gambia) Gambia Ports Authority	1	0	1
(Democratic Republic of the Congo) AS Vita Club	1	2	3

Preliminary round
1	(Cameroon) Coton Sport	2	5	7
4	(South Sudan) Atlabara	0	2	2
3	(Madagascar) CNaPS Sport	2	2	4 (a)
2	(Botswana) Township Rollers	1	3	4

First round
(Cameroon) Coton Sport	1	1	2
(Madagascar) CNaPS Sport	0	1	1

Preliminary round
1	(Egypt) Al-Ahly	Bye
4
3	(Réunion) Saint-Louisienne	2	1	3
2	(South Africa) Bidvest Wits	1	3	4

First round
(Egypt) Al-Ahly	1	0	1
(South Africa) Bidvest Wits	0	0	0

Preliminary round
1	(Democratic Republic of the Congo) TP Mazembe	Bye
4
3	(Lesotho) Lioli	0	1	1
2	(Zimbabwe) CAPS United	0	2	2

First round
(Democratic Republic of the Congo) TP Mazembe	1	0	1
(Zimbabwe) CAPS United	1	0	1 (a)

Preliminary round
1	(Republic of the Congo) AC Léopards	1	1	2 (a)
4	(Cameroon) UMS de Loum	0	2	2
3	(Seychelles) Côte d'Or	0	0	0
2	(Ethiopia) Saint George	2	3	5

First round
(Republic of the Congo) AC Léopards	0	0	0
(Ethiopia) Saint George	1	2	3

Preliminary round
1	(Sudan) Al-Hilal	Bye
4
3	(Kenya) Tusker	1	1	2
2	(Mauritius) AS Port-Louis 2000	1	2	3

First round
(Sudan) Al-Hilal	3	2	5
(Mauritius) AS Port-Louis 2000	0	2	2

== Preliminary round ==
The preliminary round included the 46 teams that did not receive byes to the first round.

Team 1	Agg.	Team 2	1st leg	2nd leg
Rail Club du Kadiogo (Burkina Faso)	3–1	(Republic of the Congo) Diables Noirs	3–0	0–1
Sony Elá Nguema (Equatorial Guinea)	1–5	(Sudan) Al-Merrikh	0–1	1–4
AS Real Bamako (Mali)	0–4	(Nigeria) Rivers United	0–0	0–4
AS Tanda (Ivory Coast)	4–3	(Niger) AS FAN	3–0	1–3
US Gorée (Senegal)	1–2	(Guinea) Horoya	0–0	1–2
Johansen (Sierra Leone)	1–4	(Morocco) FUS Rabat	1–1	0–3
Wa All Stars (Ghana)	1–5	(Libya) Al-Ahli Tripoli	1–3	0–2
KCCA (Uganda)	2–2 (a)	(Angola) 1º de Agosto	1–0	1–2
CF Mounana (Gabon)	3–0	(Burundi) Vital'O	2–0	1–0
Zanaco (Zambia)	1–0	(Rwanda) APR	0–0	1–0
Ngaya Club (Comoros)	2–6	(Tanzania) Young Africans	1–5	1–1
Barrack Young Controllers (Liberia)	1–1 (7–6 p)	(Mali) Stade Malien	1–0	0–1
Zimamoto (Zanzibar)	3–4	(Mozambique) Ferroviário Beira	2–1	1–3
JS Saoura (Algeria)	1–1 (a)	(Nigeria) Enugu Rangers	1–1	0–0
Royal Leopards (Eswatini)	1–4	(Democratic Republic of the Congo) AS Vita Club	0–1	1–3
Gambia Ports Authority (The Gambia)	1–0	(Ivory Coast) Séwé Sport	1–0	0–0
CNaPS Sport (Madagascar)	4–4 (a)	(Botswana) Township Rollers	2–1	2–3
Coton Sport (Cameroon)	7–2	(South Sudan) Atlabara	2–0	5–2
Saint-Louisienne (Réunion)	3–4	(South Africa) Bidvest Wits	2–1	1–3
Lioli (Lesotho)	1–2	(Zimbabwe) CAPS United	0–0	1–2
Côte d'Or (Seychelles)	0–5	(Ethiopia) Saint George	0–2	0–3
AC Léopards (Republic of the Congo)	2–2 (a)	(Cameroon) UMS de Loum	1–0	1–2
Tusker (Kenya)	2–3	(Mauritius) AS Port-Louis 2000	1–1	1–2

11 February 2017
16:00 UTC+0

Rail Club du Kadiogo (Burkina Faso)	3–0	(Republic of the Congo) Diables Noirs
Jeremiah 23', 64'; Sylla 84'	Report

Stade du 4 Août, Ouagadougou
Referee: Kokou Fagla (Togo)
19 February 2017
15:30 UTC+1

Diables Noirs (Republic of the Congo)	1–0	(Burkina Faso) Rail Club du Kadiogo
Nkolo 27'	Report

Stade Alphonse Massemba-Débat, Brazzaville
Referee: Jean Marc Ganamandji (Central African Republic)

Rail Club du Kadiogo won 3–1 on aggregate.

12 February 2017
17:30 UTC+1

Sony Elá Nguema (Equatorial Guinea)	0–1	(Sudan) Al-Merrikh
	Report	Osunwa 90'

Estadio de Malabo, Malabo
Referee: Aurélien Juenkou (Cameroon)
18 February 2017
20:00 UTC+3

Al-Merrikh (Sudan)	4–1	(Equatorial Guinea) Sony Elá Nguema
Al-Madina 23'; Odunlami 29'; Abdalla 31', 64'	Report	Zanga 85'

Al-Merrikh Stadium, Omdurman
Referee: Hassan Mohamed Hagi (Somalia)

Al-Merrikh won 5–1 on aggregate.

11 February 2017
17:00 UTC+0

AS Real Bamako (Mali)	0–0	(Nigeria) Rivers United
	Report

Stade Modibo Kéïta, Bamako
Referee: Eugene Tohouegnon (Benin)
19 February 2017
16:00 UTC+1

Rivers United (Nigeria)	4–0	(Mali) AS Real Bamako
Ovoke 28' (pen.), 62' (pen.); Igbinoba 56', 79'	Report

Yakubu Gowon Stadium, Port Harcourt
Referee: Daniel Laryea (Ghana)

Rivers United won 4–0 on aggregate.

11 February 2017
16:00 UTC+0

AS Tanda (Ivory Coast)	3–0	(Niger) AS FAN
Sahui 46'; Foba 70'; Coulibaly 81'	Report

Stade Robert Champroux, Abidjan
Referee: Jean Ouattara (Burkina Faso)
18 February 2017
16:00 UTC+1

AS FAN (Niger)	3–1	(Ivory Coast) AS Tanda
Seyni 25'; Balé 46'; Amarh 73'	Report	Sahui 42'

Stade Général-Seyni-Kountché, Niamey
Referee: Quadri Ololade Adebimpe (Nigeria)

AS Tanda won 4–3 on aggregate.

11 February 2017
17:00 UTC+0

US Gorée (Senegal)	0–0	(Guinea) Horoya
	Report

Stade Demba Diop, Dakar
Referee: Gilberto dos Santos (Guinea-Bissau)
19 February 2017
17:00 UTC+0

Horoya (Guinea)	2–1	(Senegal) US Gorée
Haba 62'; Bangoura 72' (pen.)	Report	N'Diaye 39'

Stade du 28 Septembre, Conakry
Referee: Harouna Coulibaly (Mali)

Horoya won 2–1 on aggregate.

11 February 2017
16:30 UTC+0

Johansen (Sierra Leone)	1–1	(Morocco) FUS Rabat
Bangura 50'	Report	Nahiri 73'

National Stadium, Freetown
Referee: Babacar Sarr (Mauritania)
18 February 2017
19:30 UTC+0

FUS Rabat (Morocco)	3–0	(Sierra Leone) Johansen
Benarif 18'; Njie 77'; El Araoui 90+2'	Report

Stade de FUS, Rabat
Referee: Lahlou Benbraham (Algeria)

FUS Rabat won 4–1 on aggregate.

12 February 2017
14:00 UTC+0

Wa All Stars (Ghana)	1–3	(Libya) Al-Ahli Tripoli
Arthur 59'	Report	Ellafi 22', 63'; Saltou 50'

Tamale Stadium, Tamale
Referee: Jerry Yekeh (Liberia)
19 February 2017
14:30 UTC+1

Al-Ahli Tripoli (Libya)	2–0	(Ghana) Wa All Stars
Ellafi 2'; Saltou 64'	Report

Stade El Menzah, Tunis (Tunisia) (Note: Teams from Libya were not allowed to host their home matches in their country due to security concerns.)
Referee: Mohamed Maarouf (Egypt)

Al-Ahli Tripoli won 5–1 on aggregate.

10 February 2017
16:00 UTC+3

KCCA (Uganda)	1–0	(Angola) 1º de Agosto
Sserunkuma 48'	Report

Phillip Omondi Stadium, Kampala
Referee: Israel Mpaima (Kenya)
19 February 2017
17:00 UTC+1

1º de Agosto (Angola)	2–1	(Uganda) KCCA
Bua 31'; Geraldo 38'	Report	Sserunkuma 21'

Estádio 11 de Novembro, Luanda
Referee: Lazard Tsiba (Congo)

2–2 on aggregate. KCCA won on away goals.

11 February 2017
15:30 UTC+1

CF Mounana (Gabon)	2–0	(Burundi) Vital'O
Biyoghé 36'; Mensah 45'	Report

Stade Augustin Monédan de Sibang, Libreville
Referee: Alhadi Mahamat (Chad)
19 February 2017
15:00 UTC+2

Vital'O (Burundi)	0–1	(Gabon) CF Mounana
	Report	Mensah 48'

Prince Louis Rwagasore Stadium, Bujumbura
Referee: Israel Mujuni (Tanzania)

CF Mounana won 3–0 on aggregate.

11 February 2017
15:00 UTC+2

Zanaco (Zambia)	0–0	(Rwanda) APR
	Report

Nkoloma Stadium, Lusaka
Referee: Nomore Murambiwa Musundire (Zimbabwe)
18 February 2017
15:30 UTC+2

APR (Rwanda)	0–1	(Zambia) Zanaco
	Report	Bwembya 17'

Amahoro Stadium, Kigali
Referee: Pacifique Ndabihawenimana (Burundi)

Zanaco won 1–0 on aggregate

12 February 2017
15:00 UTC+3

Ngaya Club (Comoros)	1–5	(Tanzania) Young Africans
Boura 65'	Report	Zulu 40'; Msuva 45'; Chirwa 57'; Tambwe 64'; Kamusoko 72'

Stade de Moroni, Moroni
Referee: Nelson Emile (Seychelles)
18 February 2017
16:00 UTC+3

Young Africans (Tanzania)	1–1	(Comoros) Ngaya Club
Mwinyi 44'	Report	Bossou 20' (o.g.)

National Stadium, Dar es Salaam
Referee: Alex Muhabi (Uganda)

Young Africans won 6–2 on aggregate.

12 February 2017
16:00 UTC+0

Barrack Young Controllers (Liberia)	1–0	(Mali) Stade Malien
Kennedy 86' (pen.)	Report

Antoinette Tubman Stadium, Monrovia
Referee: Raymond Coker (Sierra Leone)
19 February 2017
17:00 UTC+0

Stade Malien (Mali)	1–0	(Liberia) Barrack Young Controllers
Koné 45'	Report
Penalties
A. Diarra (penalty scored); I. Samaké (penalty scored); Hamed (penalty scored); Diallo (penalty scored); D. Diarra (penalty missed); Sidibé (penalty missed); N. Samaké (penalty scored); Coulibaly (penalty scored); Doumbia (penalty missed)	6–7	(penalty scored) Kennedy; (penalty missed) Barshall; (penalty scored) Sembeh; (penalty scored) Paye; (penalty scored) Bility; (penalty missed) Kamara; (penalty scored) Somah; (penalty scored) Dougbeh; (penalty scored) Harmon

Stade Modibo Kéïta, Bamako
Referee: Samir Guezzaz (Morocco)

1–1 on aggregate. Barrack Young Controllers won 7–6 on penalties.

11 February 2017
16:30 UTC+3

Zimamoto (Zanzibar)	2–1	(Mozambique) Ferroviário Beira
Abdalla 34'; Ali 66'	Report	Correia 2' (pen.)

Amaan Stadium, Zanzibar City
Referee: Mashood Ssali (Uganda)
19 February 2017
15:00 UTC+2

Ferroviário Beira (Mozambique)	3–1	(Zanzibar) Zimamoto
Chelito 4'; Dayo 22'; Babo 61'	Report	Ali 78'

Estádio do Ferroviário, Beira
Referee: Thulani Sibandze (Swaziland)

Ferroviário Beira won 4–3 on aggregate.

10 February 2017
19:00 UTC+1

JS Saoura (Algeria)	1–1	(Nigeria) Enugu Rangers
Bourdim 32'	Report	Clement 39'

Stade 20 Août 1955, Béchar
Attendance: 20,000
Referee: Maguette N'Diaye (Senegal)
19 February 2017
16:00 UTC+1

Enugu Rangers (Nigeria)	0–0	(Algeria) JS Saoura
	Report

Nnamdi Azikiwe Stadium, Enugu
Referee: Bienvenu Sinko (Ivory Coast)

1–1 on aggregate. Enugu Rangers won on away goals.

11 February 2017
15:00 UTC+2

Royal Leopards (Eswatini)	0–1	(Democratic Republic of the Congo) AS Vita Club
	Report	Ondo 37'

Somhlolo National Stadium, Lobamba
Referee: João Goma (Angola)
19 February 2017
15:30 UTC+1

AS Vita Club (Democratic Republic of the Congo)	3–1	(Eswatini) Royal Leopards
Etekiama 56', 63'; Bangala 90'	Report	Tsabedze 88'

Stade des Martyrs, Kinshasa
Referee: Thando Ndzandzeka (South Africa)

AS Vita Club won 4–1 on aggregate.

12 February 2017
16:00 UTC+0

Gambia Ports Authority (The Gambia)	1–0	(Ivory Coast) Séwé Sport
Sambou 24'	Report

Independence Stadium, Bakau
Referee: Fabricio Duarte (Cape Verde)
19 February 2017
15:30 UTC+0

Séwé Sport (Ivory Coast)	0–0	(The Gambia) Gambia Ports Authority
	Report

Stade Robert Champroux, Abidjan
Referee: Abdoulaye Rhissa Almoustapha (Niger)

Gambia Ports Authority won 1–0 on aggregate.

11 February 2017
14:30 UTC+3

CNaPS Sport (Madagascar)	2–1	(Botswana) Township Rollers
Rafaralahy 45'; Rakotoharimalala 74'	Report	Boy 66'

Vontovorona Stadium, Antananarivo
Referee: Zefanias Chijamela (Mozambique)
18 February 2017
16:00 UTC+2

Township Rollers (Botswana)	3–2	(Madagascar) CNaPS Sport
Tshireletso 31'; Moalosi 59' (pen.); Boy 67'	Report	Niasexe 13'; Gabonamong 66' (o.g.)

Botswana National Stadium, Gaborone
Referee: Lebalang Martin Mokete (Lesotho)

4–4 on aggregate. CNaPS Sport won on away goals.

12 February 2017
15:30 UTC+1

Coton Sport (Cameroon)	2–0	(South Sudan) Atlabara
Kombous 12'; Belamo 89'	Report

Roumdé Adjia Stadium, Garoua
Referee: Jean-Jacques Ndala Ngambo (DR Congo)
18 February 2017
16:30 UTC+3

Atlabara (South Sudan)	2–5	(Cameroon) Coton Sport
Wurube 40' (pen.); Ajak 86'	Report	Souleymanou 12'; Mahamat 18'; Daouda 44', 58'; Batai 82'

Juba Stadium, Juba
Referee: Souleiman Ahmed Djama (Djibouti)

Coton Sport won 7–2 on aggregate.

11 February 2017
19:00 UTC+4

Saint-Louisienne (Réunion)	2–1	(South Africa) Bidvest Wits
Sophie 60'; Visnelda 90+1' (pen.)	Report	Mhango 40'

Stade Théophile Hoarau, Saint-Louis
Referee: Soulaimane Ansudane (Comoros)
18 February 2017
18:00 UTC+2

Bidvest Wits (South Africa)	3–1	(Réunion) Saint-Louisienne
Klate 27'; Myeni 46'; Malajila 85'	Report	Philéas 79'

Bidvest Stadium, Johannesburg
Referee: Wisdom Chewe (Zambia)

Bidvets Wits won 4–3 on aggregate.

11 February 2017
16:00 UTC+2

Lioli (Lesotho)	0–0	(Zimbabwe) CAPS United
	Report

Setsoto Stadium, Maseru
Referee: Jackson Pavaza (Namibia)
19 February 2017
15:00 UTC+2

CAPS United (Zimbabwe)	2–1	(Lesotho) Lioli
Nhivi 51'; Chitiyo 55'	Report	Seturumane 20'

National Sports Stadium, Harare
Referee: Tirelo Mositwane (Botswana)

CAPS United won 2–1 on aggregate.

11 February 2017
16:00 UTC+4

Côte d'Or (Seychelles)	0–2	(Ethiopia) Saint George
	Report	Saladin 40', 61'

Stade d’Amitié, Praslin
Referee: Ahmad Imtehaz Heeralall (Mauritius)
19 February 2017
16:00 UTC+3 (Note: The Saint George v Côte d'Or match was interrupted after 60 minutes due to heavy rain, and was completed the next day.)

Saint George (Ethiopia)	3–0	(Seychelles) Côte d'Or
Saladin 9'; Aschalew 30'; Adane 36' (pen.)	Report

Hawassa International Stadium, Awasa
Referee: Mahmood Ali Mahmood Ismail (Sudan)

Saint George won 5–0 on aggregate.

12 February 2017
15:30 UTC+1

AC Léopards (Republic of the Congo)	1–0	(Cameroon) UMS de Loum
Bagayoko 40' (pen.)	Report

Stade Denis Sassou Nguesso, Dolisie
Referee: Gauthier Marc Mihindou Mbina (Gabon)
19 February 2017
15:30 UTC+1

UMS de Loum (Cameroon)	2–1	(Republic of the Congo) AC Léopards
Kako 39'; Ugochukwu 54'	Report	Kalengo 53'

Stade de la Réunification, Douala
Referee: Joaquin Esono (Equatorial Guinea)

2–2 on aggregate. AC Léopards won on away goals.

11 February 2017
15:00 UTC+3

Tusker (Kenya)	1–1	(Mauritius) AS Port-Louis 2000
Batambuze 29'	Report	Guikan 48'

Moi International Sports Centre, Nairobi
Referee: Belay Tadesse (Ethiopia)
19 February 2017
15:15 UTC+4

AS Port-Louis 2000 (Mauritius)	2–1	(Kenya) Tusker
Guikan 84', 88'	Report	Sempala 37'

Stade George V, Curepipe
Referee: Andofetra Rakotojaona (Madagascar)

AS Port-Louis 2000 won 3–2 on aggregate.

== First round ==
The first round included 32 teams: the 23 winners of the preliminary round, and the 9 teams that received byes to this round.

Team 1	Agg.	Team 2	1st leg	2nd leg
USM Alger (Algeria)	2–1	(Burkina Faso) Rail Club du Kadiogo	2–0	0–1
Rivers United (Nigeria)	3–4	(Sudan) Al-Merrikh	3–0	0–4
Étoile du Sahel (Tunisia)	5–1	(Ivory Coast) AS Tanda	3–0	2–1
Espérance de Tunis (Tunisia)	4–3	(Guinea) Horoya	3–1	1–2
Al-Ahli Tripoli (Libya)	3–3 (a)	(Morocco) FUS Rabat	2–0	1–3
Mamelodi Sundowns (South Africa)	3–2	(Uganda) KCCA	2–1	1–1
Wydad AC (Morocco)	1–1 (5–4 p)	(Gabon) CF Mounana	1–0	0–1
Young Africans (Tanzania)	1–1 (a)	(Zambia) Zanaco	1–1	0–0
Ferroviário Beira (Mozambique)	2–2 (4–1 p)	(Liberia) Barrack Young Controllers	2–0	0–2
Zamalek (Egypt)	5–3	(Nigeria) Enugu Rangers	4–1	1–2
Gambia Ports Authority (The Gambia)	1–3	(Democratic Republic of the Congo) AS Vita Club	1–1	0–2
Coton Sport (Cameroon)	2–1	(Madagascar) CNaPS Sport	1–0	1–1
Al Ahly (Egypt)	1–0	(South Africa) Bidvest Wits	1–0	0–0
TP Mazembe (Democratic Republic of the Congo)	1–1 (a)	(Zimbabwe) CAPS United	1–1	0–0
AC Léopards (Republic of the Congo)	0–3	(Ethiopia) Saint George	0–1	0–2
Al-Hilal (Sudan)	5–2	(Mauritius) AS Port-Louis 2000	3–0	2–2

11 March 2017
20:30 UTC+1

USM Alger (Algeria)	2–0	(Burkina Faso) Rail Club du Kadiogo
Darfalou 71'; Sayoud 86'	Report

Stade Omar Hammadi, Algiers
Referee: Youssef Essrayri (Tunisia)
18 March 2017
15:30 UTC+0

Rail Club du Kadiogo (Burkina Faso)	1–0	(Algeria) USM Alger
Kahan 53'	Report

Stade du 4 Août, Ouagadougou
Referee: Abdoulaye Rhissa Almoustapha (Niger)

USM Alger won 2–1 on aggregate.

12 March 2017
16:00 UTC+1

Rivers United (Nigeria)	3–0	(Sudan) Al-Merrikh
Kuemian 17', 18'; Igbinoba 81'	Report

Yakubu Gowon Stadium, Port Harcourt
Referee: Gehad Grisha (Egypt)
18 March 2017
20:00 UTC+3

Al-Merrikh (Sudan)	4–0	(Nigeria) Rivers United
Al-Madina 8', 25', 45' (pen.); Kamal 71'	Report

Al-Merrikh Stadium, Omdurman
Referee: Malang Diedhiou (Senegal)

Al-Merrikh won 4–3 on aggregate.

12 March 2017
18:00 UTC+1

Étoile du Sahel (Tunisia)	3–0	(Ivory Coast) AS Tanda
Boughattas 40'; Jemal 44'; Bouazza 72'	Report

Stade Olympique de Sousse, Sousse
Referee: Bamlak Tessema Weyesa (Ethiopia)
19 March 2017
15:00 UTC+0

AS Tanda (Ivory Coast)	1–2	(Tunisia) Étoile du Sahel
Zougoula 78'	Report	Diogo Acosta 61'; Ben Amor 65'

Stade Robert Champroux, Abidjan
Referee: Cecil Fleischer (Ghana)

Étoile du Sahel won 5–1 on aggregate.

11 March 2017
18:00 UTC+1

Espérance de Tunis (Tunisia)	3–1	(Guinea) Horoya
Sassi 20', 54'; Ben Youssef 75'	Report	Mando 24'

Stade Olympique de Radès, Tunis
Referee: Mutaz Khairalla (Sudan)
19 March 2017
16:00 UTC+0

Horoya (Guinea)	2–1	(Tunisia) Espérance de Tunis
Ouédraogo 30'; Mando 54'	Report	Mbarki 45'

Stade du 28 Septembre, Conakry
Referee: Bakary Gassama (Gambia)

Espérance de Tunis won 4–3 on aggregate.

12 March 2017
14:30 UTC+1

Al-Ahli Tripoli (Libya)	2–0	(Morocco) FUS Rabat
Ellafi 44'; Ablo 72'	Report

Stade El Menzah, Tunis (Tunisia)
Referee: Denis Dembélé (Ivory Coast)
18 March 2017
19:00 UTC+0

FUS Rabat (Morocco)	3–1	(Libya) Al-Ahli Tripoli
El Bahri 15', 24'; Aguerd 89'	Report	Saltou 48'

Stade de FUS, Rabat
Referee: Juste Ephrem Zio (Burkina Faso)

3–3 on aggregate. Al-Ahli Tripoli won on away goals.

10 March 2017
19:00 UTC+2

Mamelodi Sundowns (South Africa)	2–1	(Uganda) KCCA
Bangaly 2'; Nascimento 6' (pen.)	Report	Sserunkuma 69'

Lucas Masterpieces Moripe Stadium, Pretoria
Referee: Janny Sikazwe (Zambia)
18 March 2017
16:00 UTC+3

KCCA (Uganda)	1–1	(South Africa) Mamelodi Sundowns
Sserunkuma 30'	Report	Laffor 81'

Phillip Omondi Stadium, Kampala
Referee: Joshua Bondo (Botswana)

Mamelodi Sundowns won 3–2 on aggregate.

11 March 2017
19:00 UTC+0

Wydad AC (Morocco)	1–0	(Gabon) CF Mounana
Jebor 83'	Report

Prince Moulay Abdellah Stadium, Rabat
Referee: Ali Lemghaifry (Mauritania)
18 March 2017
15:00 UTC+1

CF Mounana (Gabon)	1–0	(Morocco) Wydad AC
Sinayoko 90'	Report
Penalties
Mensah (penalty scored); Coulibaly (penalty scored); Biyoghé (penalty missed); Sinayoko (penalty scored); Autchanga (penalty scored)	4–5	(penalty scored) Atouchi; (penalty scored) Khadrouf; (penalty scored) Rabeh; (penalty scored) Ben Idir; (penalty scored) Gaddarine

Stade Augustin Monédan de Sibang, Libreville
Referee: Sidi Alioum (Cameroon)

1–1 on aggregate. Wydad AC won 5–4 on penalties.

11 March 2017
16:00 UTC+3

Young Africans (Tanzania)	1–1	(Zambia) Zanaco
Msuva 39'	Report	Attram 77'

National Stadium, Dar es Salaam
Referee: Djamal Aden (Djibouti)
18 March 2017
15:00 UTC+2

Zanaco (Zambia)	0–0	(Tanzania) Young Africans
	Report

National Heroes Stadium, Lusaka
Referee: Davies Omweno (Kenya)

1–1 on aggregate. Zanaco won on away goals.

12 March 2017
15:00 UTC+2

Ferroviário Beira (Mozambique)	2–0	(Liberia) Barrack Young Controllers
Maninho 39', 75'	Report

Estádio do Ferroviário, Beira
Referee: Sabri Mohamed Fadul (Sudan)
19 March 2017
16:00 UTC+0

Barrack Young Controllers (Liberia)	2–0	(Mozambique) Ferroviário Beira
Bility 16'; Kennedy 43' (pen.)	Report
Penalties
Kennedy (penalty scored); Sembeh (penalty missed); Yahweh (penalty missed)	1–4	(penalty scored) Mambucho; (penalty scored) Dayo; (penalty scored) Edson; (penalty scored) Andro

Antoinette Tubman Stadium, Monrovia
Referee: Mohamed Ragab Omar (Libya)

2–2 on aggregate. Ferroviário Beira won 4–1 on penalties.

12 March 2017
18:00 UTC+2

Zamalek (Egypt)	4–1	(Nigeria) Enugu Rangers
Ohawuchi 8'; Salama 28'; Hefny 33'; Fathi 54' (pen.)	Report	Clement 83'

Al-Salam Stadium, Cairo
Attendance: 10,000
Referee: Daniel Bennett (South Africa)
19 March 2017
16:00 UTC+1

Enugu Rangers (Nigeria)	2–1	(Egypt) Zamalek
Olusesi 44'; Aguda 88' (pen.)	Report	Morsy 71'

Nnamdi Azikiwe Stadium, Enugu
Referee: Eric Otogo-Castane (Gabon)

Zamalek won 5–3 on aggregate.

12 March 2017
16:00 UTC+0

Gambia Ports Authority (The Gambia)	1–1	(Democratic Republic of the Congo) AS Vita Club
Sarr 46'	Report	Ondo 74'

Independence Stadium, Bakau
Referee: Yakhouba Keita (Guinea)
19 March 2017
15:30 UTC+1

AS Vita Club (Democratic Republic of the Congo)	2–0	(The Gambia) Gambia Ports Authority
Sugira 39'; Ondo 76'	Report

Stade des Martyrs, Kinshasa
Referee: Hamada Nampiandraza (Madagascar)

AS Vita Club won 3–1 on aggregate.

12 March 2017
15:30 UTC+1

Coton Sport (Cameroon)	1–0	(Madagascar) CNaPS Sport
Mahamat 90'	Report

Roumdé Adjia Stadium, Garoua
Referee: Fitial Charel Just Kokolo (Congo)
18 March 2017
14:30 UTC+3

CNaPS Sport (Madagascar)	1–1	(Cameroon) Coton Sport
Rafaralahy 89'	Report	Souleymanou 60'

Vontovorona Stadium, Antananarivo
Referee: Louis Hakizimana (Rwanda)

Coton Sport won 2–1 on aggregate.

11 March 2017
18:30 UTC+2

Al Ahly (Egypt)	1–0	(South Africa) Bidvest Wits
Hegazi 56'	Report

Al-Salam Stadium, Cairo
Attendance: 7,000
Referee: Rédouane Jiyed (Morocco)
19 March 2017
15:30 UTC+2

Bidvest Wits (South Africa)	0–0	(Egypt) Al Ahly
	Report

Bidvest Stadium, Johannesburg
Referee: Hélder Martins de Carvalho (Angola)

Al Ahly won 1–0 on aggregate.

12 March 2017
15:30 UTC+2

TP Mazembe (Democratic Republic of the Congo)	1–1	(Zimbabwe) CAPS United
Kalaba 9'	Report	Amidu 1'

Stade TP Mazembe, Lubumbashi
Referee: Pacifique Ndabihawenimana (Burundi)
19 March 2017
15:00 UTC+2

CAPS United (Zimbabwe)	0–0	(Democratic Republic of the Congo) TP Mazembe
	Report

National Sports Stadium, Harare
Referee: Bernard Camille (Seychelles)

1–1 on aggregate. CAPS United won on away goals.

12 March 2017
15:30 UTC+1

AC Léopards (Republic of the Congo)	0–1	(Ethiopia) Saint George
	Report	Mentsenot 25'

Stade Denis Sassou Nguesso, Dolisie
Referee: Jean-Jacques Ndala Ngambo (DR Congo)
19 March 2017
16:00 UTC+3

Saint George (Ethiopia)	2–0	(Republic of the Congo) AC Léopards
Saladin 15', 90'	Report

Addis Ababa Stadium, Addis Ababa
Referee: Hassan Mohamed Hagi (Somalia)

Saint George won 3–0 on aggregate.

12 March 2017
20:00 UTC+3

Al-Hilal (Sudan)	3–0	(Mauritius) AS Port-Louis 2000
Okrah 16'; Bashir 44', 49'	Report

Al-Hilal Stadium, Omdurman
Referee: Denis Batte (Uganda)
19 March 2017
15:15 UTC+4

AS Port-Louis 2000 (Mauritius)	2–2	(Sudan) Al-Hilal
Ravina 14'; Guikan 25'	Report	Tetteh 75', 78'

Stade George V, Curepipe
Referee: Israel Mujuni (Tanzania)

Al-Hilal won 5–2 on aggregate.
