= 2017 CAF Champions League =

African club football tournament

2017 Total CAF Champions League

Tournament details
- Dates: 10 February – 4 November 2017
- Teams: 55 (from 43 associations)

Final positions
- Champions: (Morocco) Wydad AC (2nd title)
- Runners-up: (Egypt) Al Ahly

Tournament statistics
- Matches played: 138
- Goals scored: 318 (2.3 per match)
- Top scorer: (Tunisia) Taha Yassine Khenissi (7 goals)

The 2017 CAF Champions League (officially the 2017 Total CAF Champions League for sponsorship reasons) was the 53rd edition of Africa's premier club football tournament organized by the Confederation of African Football (CAF), and the 21st edition under the current CAF Champions League title.

Starting from this season, the group stage was expanded from eight to 16 teams, divided into four groups of four, and the knockout stage expanded from 4 to 8 teams.

Wydad AC defeated Al Ahly in the final to win their second African Cup of Champions Clubs/CAF Champions League title, and qualified as the CAF representative at the 2017 FIFA Club World Cup in the United Arab Emirates, and also earned the right to play against the winners of the 2017 CAF Confederation Cup, TP Mazembe, in the 2018 CAF Super Cup. Mamelodi Sundowns were the defending champions, but were eliminated in the quarter-finals by Wydad Casablanca. This is also the last time a club from Libya made the group stage.

== Association team allocation ==
All 56 CAF member associations may enter the CAF Champions League, with the 12 highest ranked associations according to their CAF 5-year ranking eligible to enter two teams in the competition. As a result, theoretically a maximum of 68 teams could enter the tournament – although this level has never been reached.

For the 2017 CAF Champions League, the CAF uses the 2011–2015 CAF 5-year ranking, which calculates points for each entrant association based on their clubs' performance over those 5 years in the CAF Champions League and CAF Confederation Cup. The criteria for points are the following:

	CAF Champions League	CAF Confederation Cup
Winners	5 points	4 points
Runners-up	4 points	3 points
Losing semi-finalists	3 points	2 points
3rd place in groups	2 points	1 point
4th place in groups	1 point	1 point

The points are multiplied by a coefficient according to the year as follows:

- 2015 – 5
- 2014 – 4
- 2013 – 3
- 2012 – 2
- 2011 – 1

== Teams ==
The following 55 teams from 43 associations entered the competition.

- Teams in **bold** received a bye to the first round.
- The other teams entered the preliminary round.

Associations are shown according to their 2011–2015 CAF 5-year ranking – those with a ranking score have their rank and score indicated.

Association	Team	Qualifying method
Associations eligible to enter two teams (Ranked 1–12)
Tunisia (1st – 100 pts)	**Étoile du Sahel**	2015–16 Tunisian Ligue Professionnelle 1 champions
Tunisia (1st – 100 pts)	**Espérance de Tunis**	2015–16 Tunisian Ligue Professionnelle 1 runners-up
Egypt (2nd – 80 pts)	**Al Ahly**	2015–16 Egyptian Premier League champions
Egypt (2nd – 80 pts)	**Zamalek**	2015–16 Egyptian Premier League runners-up
(Democratic Republic of the Congo) DR Congo (3rd – 69 pts)	**TP Mazembe**	2015–16 Linafoot champions
(Democratic Republic of the Congo) DR Congo (3rd – 69 pts)	AS Vita Club	2015–16 Linafoot runners-up
Algeria (4th – 64 pts)	**USM Alger**	2015–16 Algerian Ligue Professionnelle 1 champions
Algeria (4th – 64 pts)	JS Saoura	2015–16 Algerian Ligue Professionnelle 1 runners-up
Sudan (5th – 51 pts)	**Al-Hilal**	2016 Sudan Premier League champions
Sudan (5th – 51 pts)	Al-Merrikh	2016 Sudan Premier League runners-up
(South Africa) South Africa (6th – 27 pts)	**Mamelodi Sundowns**	Title holders (2016 CAF Champions League winners); 2015–16 South African Premier Division champions
(South Africa) South Africa (6th – 27 pts)	Bidvest Wits	2015–16 South African Premier Division runners-up
(Republic of the Congo) Congo (T-7th – 24 pts)	AC Léopards	2016 Congo Ligue 1 champions
(Republic of the Congo) Congo (T-7th – 24 pts)	Diables Noirs	2016 Congo Ligue 1 runners-up
Morocco (T-7th – 24 pts)	FUS Rabat	2015–16 Botola champions
Morocco (T-7th – 24 pts)	**Wydad AC**	2015–16 Botola runners-up
(Ivory Coast) Ivory Coast (T-9th – 23 pts)	AS Tanda	2015–16 Côte d'Ivoire Ligue 1 champions
(Ivory Coast) Ivory Coast (T-9th – 23 pts)	Séwé Sport	2015–16 Côte d'Ivoire Ligue 1 runners-up
Mali (T-9th – 23 pts)	Stade Malien	2016 Malian Première Division champions
Mali (T-9th – 23 pts)	AS Real Bamako	2016 Malian Première Division runners-up
Cameroon (11th – 19 pts)	UMS de Loum	2016 Elite One champions
Cameroon (11th – 19 pts)	Coton Sport	2016 Elite One runners-up
Nigeria (12th – 12 pts)	Enugu Rangers	2016 Nigeria Professional Football League champions
Nigeria (12th – 12 pts)	Rivers United	2016 Nigeria Professional Football League runners-up
Associations eligible to enter one team
Angola (13th – 7 pts)	1º de Agosto	2016 Girabola champions
Ghana (T-14th – 4 pts)	Wa All Stars	2016 Ghanaian Premier League champions
Libya (T-14th – 4 pts)	Al-Ahli Tripoli	2016 Libyan Premier League champions
Zambia (T-14th – 4 pts)	Zanaco	2016 Zambia Super League champions
Ethiopia (17th – 3 pts)	Saint George	2015–16 Ethiopian Premier League champions
Botswana	Township Rollers	2015–16 Botswana Premier League champions
(Burkina Faso) Burkina Faso	Rail Club du Kadiogo	2015–16 Burkinabé Premier League champions
Burundi	Vital'O	2015–16 Burundi Premier League champions
Comoros	Ngaya Club	2016 Comoros Premier League champions
(Equatorial Guinea) Equatorial Guinea	Sony Elá Nguema	2015–16 Equatoguinean Primera División champions
Gabon	CF Mounana	2015–16 Gabon Championnat National D1 champions
(The Gambia) Gambia	Gambia Ports Authority	2015–16 GFA League First Division champions
Guinea	Horoya	2015–16 Guinée Championnat National champions
Kenya	Tusker	2016 Kenyan Premier League champions
Lesotho	Lioli	2015–16 Lesotho Premier League champions
Liberia	Barrack Young Controllers	2016 Liberian First Division League champions
Madagascar	CNaPS Sport	2016 THB Champions League champions
Mauritius	AS Port-Louis 2000	2015–16 Mauritian Premier League champions
Mozambique	Ferroviário Beira	2016 Moçambola champions
Niger	AS FAN	2015–16 Niger Premier League champions
Réunion	Saint-Louisienne	2015 Réunion Premier League runners-up
Rwanda	APR	2015–16 Rwanda National Football League champions
Senegal	US Gorée	2015–16 Senegal Premier League champions
Seychelles	Côte d'Or	2016 Seychelles First Division champions
(Sierra Leone) Sierra Leone	Johansen	2016 Sierra Leonean FA Cup winners
(South Sudan) South Sudan	Atlabara	2015 South Sudan Football Championship champions
(Eswatini) Swaziland	Royal Leopards	2015–16 Swazi Premier League champions
Tanzania	Young Africans	2015–16 Tanzanian Premier League champions
Uganda	KCCA	2015–16 Uganda Super League champions
Zanzibar	Zimamoto	2015–16 Zanzibar Premier League champions
Zimbabwe	CAPS United	2016 Zimbabwe Premier Soccer League champions

Notes

1. Réunion (REU): Réunion were represented by Saint-Louisienne, 2015 Réunion Premier League runners-up, as the 2016 Réunion Premier League was not completed by the end of the year.
2. Sierra Leone (SLE): Sierra Leone were represented by Johansen, the 2016 Sierra Leonean FA Cup winners, as the league was not played in 2016.
3. South Sudan (SSD): South Sudan were represented by Atlabara, the 2015 South Sudan Football Championship champions, as the league was not played in 2016.

Associations which did not enter a team

- Benin
- (Cape Verde) Cape Verde
- (Central African Republic) Central African Republic
- Chad
- Djibouti
- Eritrea
- Guinea-Bissau
- Malawi
- Mauritania
- Namibia
- (São Tomé and Príncipe) São Tomé and Príncipe
- Somalia
- Togo
Location of teams of the 2017 CAF Champions League.
Red: Preliminary round; Green: First Round;
Brown: Group A; Orange: Group B; Yellow: Group C; Blue: Group D.

== Schedule ==
The schedule of the competition was as follows (matches scheduled in midweek in italics).

Phase	Round	Draw date	First leg	Second leg
Qualifying	Preliminary round	21 December 2016 (Cairo, Egypt)	10–12 February 2017	17–19 February 2017
Qualifying	First round	21 December 2016 (Cairo, Egypt)	10–12 March 2017	17–19 March 2017
Group stage	Matchday 1	26 April 2017 (Cairo, Egypt)	12–14 May 2017	
Group stage	Matchday 2	26 April 2017 (Cairo, Egypt)	23–24 May 2017	
Group stage	Matchday 3	26 April 2017 (Cairo, Egypt)	2–4 June 2017	
Group stage	Matchday 4	26 April 2017 (Cairo, Egypt)	20–21 June 2017	
Group stage	Matchday 5	26 April 2017 (Cairo, Egypt)	30 June – 2 July 2017	
Group stage	Matchday 6	26 April 2017 (Cairo, Egypt)	7–9 July 2017	
Knockout stage	Quarter-finals	26 April 2017 (Cairo, Egypt)	15–17 September 2017	22–24 September 2017
Knockout stage	Semi-finals	26 April 2017 (Cairo, Egypt)	29 September – 1 October 2017	20–22 October 2017
Knockout stage	Final	26 April 2017 (Cairo, Egypt)	27–29 October 2017	3–5 November 2017

The calendar was amended from the original one for the following dates:

- Quarter-finals first leg: moved from 8–10 September to 15–17 September
- Quarter-finals second leg: moved from 15–17 September to 22–24 September
- Semi-finals second leg: moved from 13–15 October to 20–22 October

== Qualifying rounds ==
The draw for the preliminary round and first round was held on 21 December 2016 at the CAF headquarters in Cairo, Egypt. In the qualifying rounds, each tie was played on a home-and-away two-legged basis. If the aggregate score was tied after the second leg, the away goals rule would be applied, and if still tied, extra time would not be played, and the penalty shoot-out would be used to determine the winner (Regulations III. 13 & 14).

=== Preliminary round ===
Team 1	Agg.	Team 2	1st leg	2nd leg
Rail Club du Kadiogo (Burkina Faso)	3–1	(Republic of the Congo) Diables Noirs	3–0	0–1
Sony Elá Nguema (Equatorial Guinea)	1–5	(Sudan) Al-Merrikh	0–1	1–4
AS Real Bamako (Mali)	0–4	(Nigeria) Rivers United	0–0	0–4
AS Tanda (Ivory Coast)	4–3	(Niger) AS FAN	3–0	1–3
US Gorée (Senegal)	1–2	(Guinea) Horoya	0–0	1–2
Johansen (Sierra Leone)	1–4	(Morocco) FUS Rabat	1–1	0–3
Wa All Stars (Ghana)	1–5	(Libya) Al-Ahli Tripoli	1–3	0–2
KCCA (Uganda)	2–2 (a)	(Angola) 1º de Agosto	1–0	1–2
CF Mounana (Gabon)	3–0	(Burundi) Vital'O	2–0	1–0
Zanaco (Zambia)	1–0	(Rwanda) APR	0–0	1–0
Ngaya Club (Comoros)	2–6	(Tanzania) Young Africans	1–5	1–1
Barrack Young Controllers (Liberia)	1–1 (7–6 p)	(Mali) Stade Malien	1–0	0–1
Zimamoto (Zanzibar)	3–4	(Mozambique) Ferroviário Beira	2–1	1–3
JS Saoura (Algeria)	1–1 (a)	(Nigeria) Enugu Rangers	1–1	0–0
Royal Leopards (Eswatini)	1–4	(Democratic Republic of the Congo) AS Vita Club	0–1	1–3
Gambia Ports Authority (The Gambia)	1–0	(Ivory Coast) Séwé Sport	1–0	0–0
CNaPS Sport (Madagascar)	4–4 (a)	(Botswana) Township Rollers	2–1	2–3
Coton Sport (Cameroon)	7–2	(South Sudan) Atlabara	2–0	5–2
Saint-Louisienne (Réunion)	3–4	(South Africa) Bidvest Wits	2–1	1–3
Lioli (Lesotho)	1–2	(Zimbabwe) CAPS United	0–0	1–2
Côte d'Or (Seychelles)	0–5	(Ethiopia) Saint George	0–2	0–3
AC Léopards (Republic of the Congo)	2–2 (a)	(Cameroon) UMS de Loum	1–0	1–2
Tusker (Kenya)	2–3	(Mauritius) AS Port-Louis 2000	1–1	1–2

=== First round ===
The 16 winners of the first round advanced to the group stage, while the 16 losers of the first round entered the Confederation Cup play-off round.

Team 1	Agg.	Team 2	1st leg	2nd leg
USM Alger (Algeria)	2–1	(Burkina Faso) Rail Club du Kadiogo	2–0	0–1
Rivers United (Nigeria)	3–4	(Sudan) Al-Merrikh	3–0	0–4
Étoile du Sahel (Tunisia)	5–1	(Ivory Coast) AS Tanda	3–0	2–1
Espérance de Tunis (Tunisia)	4–3	(Guinea) Horoya	3–1	1–2
Al-Ahli Tripoli (Libya)	3–3 (a)	(Morocco) FUS Rabat	2–0	1–3
Mamelodi Sundowns (South Africa)	3–2	(Uganda) KCCA	2–1	1–1
Wydad AC (Morocco)	1–1 (5–4 p)	(Gabon) CF Mounana	1–0	0–1
Young Africans (Tanzania)	1–1 (a)	(Zambia) Zanaco	1–1	0–0
Ferroviário Beira (Mozambique)	2–2 (4–1 p)	(Liberia) Barrack Young Controllers	2–0	0–2
Zamalek (Egypt)	5–3	(Nigeria) Enugu Rangers	4–1	1–2
Gambia Ports Authority (The Gambia)	1–3	(Democratic Republic of the Congo) AS Vita Club	1–1	0–2
Coton Sport (Cameroon)	2–1	(Madagascar) CNaPS Sport	1–0	1–1
Al Ahly (Egypt)	1–0	(South Africa) Bidvest Wits	1–0	0–0
TP Mazembe (Democratic Republic of the Congo)	1–1 (a)	(Zimbabwe) CAPS United	1–1	0–0
AC Léopards (Republic of the Congo)	0–3	(Ethiopia) Saint George	0–1	0–2
Al-Hilal (Sudan)	5–2	(Mauritius) AS Port-Louis 2000	3–0	2–2

== Group stage ==
In the group stage, each group was played on a home-and-away round-robin basis. The winners and runners-up of each group advanced to the quarter-finals of the knockout stage.

Tiebreakers

The teams were ranked according to points (3 points for a win, 1 point for a draw, 0 points for a loss). If tied on points, tiebreakers were applied in the following order (Regulations III. 20 & 21):

1. Points in head-to-head matches among tied teams;
2. Goal difference in head-to-head matches among tied teams;
3. Goals scored in head-to-head matches among tied teams;
4. Away goals scored in head-to-head matches among tied teams;
5. If more than two teams are tied, and after applying all head-to-head criteria above, a subset of teams are still tied, all head-to-head criteria above are reapplied exclusively to this subset of teams;
6. Goal difference in all group matches;
7. Goals scored in all group matches;
8. Away goals scored in all group matches;
9. Drawing of lots.

=== Group A ===
Pos	Team	Pld	W	D	L	GF	GA	GD	Pts	Qualification	ESS	CFB	MER	HIL
1	(Tunisia) Étoile du Sahel	6	3	3	0	13	4	+9	12	Quarter-finals	—	5–0	3–0 (awd.) (Note: FIFA suspended the Sudan Football Association on 7 July 2017. As a result, both Al-Hilal and Al-Merrikh could not play their final group matches against Ferroviário Beira and Étoile du Sahel respectively, and the matches were awarded as 3–0 wins to their opponents.)	1–1
2	(Mozambique) Ferroviário Beira	6	2	2	2	6	8	−2	8	Quarter-finals	1–1	—	1–0	0–0
3	(Sudan) Al-Merrikh	6	2	1	3	6	9	−3	7		1–2	2–1	—	2–1
4	(Sudan) Al-Hilal	6	0	4	2	4	8	−4	4		1–1	0–3 (awd.)	1–1	—

Source: CAF

=== Group B ===
Pos	Team	Pld	W	D	L	GF	GA	GD	Pts	Qualification	USM	AHT	ZAM	CAP
1	(Algeria) USM Alger	6	3	2	1	12	5	+7	11	Quarter-finals	—	3–0	2–0	4–1
2	(Libya) Al-Ahli Tripoli	6	2	3	1	11	10	+1	9	Quarter-finals	1–1	—	0–0	4–2
3	(Egypt) Zamalek	6	1	3	2	6	8	−2	6 (Note: Head-to-head results: Zamalek 2–0 CAPS United, CAPS United 3–1 Zamalek (Zamalek won on away goals).)		1–1	2–2	—	2–0
4	(Zimbabwe) CAPS United	6	2	0	4	10	16	−6	6		2–1	2–4	3–1	—

Source: CAF

=== Group C ===
Pos	Team	Pld	W	D	L	GF	GA	GD	Pts	Qualification	EST	MSD	STG	VIT
1	(Tunisia) Espérance de Tunis	6	3	3	0	11	4	+7	12	Quarter-finals	—	0–0	4–0	3–1
2	(South Africa) Mamelodi Sundowns	6	2	3	1	6	4	+2	9	Quarter-finals	1–2	—	0–0	1–1
3	(Ethiopia) Saint George	6	1	2	3	2	7	−5	5 (Note: Head-to-head results: Saint George 1–0 AS Vita Club, AS Vita Club 2–1 Saint George (Saint George won on away goals).)		0–0	0–1	—	1–0
4	(Democratic Republic of the Congo) AS Vita Club	6	1	2	3	7	11	−4	5		2–2	1–3	2–1	—

Source: CAF

=== Group D ===
Pos	Team	Pld	W	D	L	GF	GA	GD	Pts	Qualification	WAC	AHL	ZAN	COT
1	(Morocco) Wydad AC	6	4	0	2	7	3	+4	12	Quarter-finals	—	2–0	1–0	2–0
2	(Egypt) Al Ahly	6	3	2	1	7	3	+4	11 (Note: Head-to-head results: Al-Ahly 0–0 Zanaco, Zanaco 0–0 Al-Ahly (tied on head-to-head results, ranked on total goal difference).)	Quarter-finals	2–0	—	0–0	3–1
3	(Zambia) Zanaco	6	3	2	1	4	2	+2	11		1–0	0–0	—	2–1
4	(Cameroon) Coton Sport	6	0	0	6	2	12	−10	0		0–2	0–2	0–1	—

Source: CAF

== Knockout stage ==
In the knockout stage, the eight teams played a single-elimination tournament. Each tie was played on a home-and-away two-legged basis. If the aggregate score was tied after the second leg, the away goals rule would be applied, and if still tied, extra time would not be played, and the penalty shoot-out would be used to determine the winner (Regulations III. 26 & 27).

=== Bracket ===
Quarter-finals
(Libya) Al Ahli Tripoli	0	0	0
(Tunisia) Étoile du Sahel	0	2	2
(Egypt) Al Ahly	2	2	4
(Tunisia) Espérance de Tunis	2	1	3
(Mozambique) Ferroviário Beira	1	0	1
(Algeria) USM Alger	1	0	1 (a)
(South Africa) Mamelodi Sundowns	1	0	1 (2)
(Morocco) Wydad AC	0	1	1 (3)

Semi-finals
(Tunisia) Étoile du Sahel	2	2	4
(Egypt) Al Ahly	1	6	7
(Algeria) USM Alger	0	1	1
(Morocco) Wydad AC	0	3	3

Final
(Egypt) Al Ahly	1	0	1
(Morocco) Wydad AC	1	1	2

=== Quarter-finals ===
In the quarter-finals, the winners of one group played the runners-up of another group, with the group winners hosting the second leg.

Team 1	Agg.	Team 2	1st leg	2nd leg
Al Ahli Tripoli (Libya)	0–2	(Tunisia) Étoile du Sahel	0–0	0–2
Al Ahly (Egypt)	4–3	(Tunisia) Espérance de Tunis	2–2	2–1
Ferroviário Beira (Mozambique)	1–1 (a)	(Algeria) USM Alger	1–1	0–0
Mamelodi Sundowns (South Africa)	1–1 (2–3 p)	(Morocco) Wydad AC	1–0	0–1

=== Semi-finals ===
In the semi-finals, the four quarter-final winners played in two ties, with the order of legs decided by an additional draw held after the group stage draw.

Team 1	Agg.	Team 2	1st leg	2nd leg
Étoile du Sahel (Tunisia)	4–7	(Egypt) Al Ahly	2–1	2–6
USM Alger (Algeria)	1–3	(Morocco) Wydad AC	0–0	1–3

=== Final ===
In the final, the two semi-final winners played each other, with the order of legs decided by an additional draw held after the group stage draw.

28 October 2017
19:00 UTC+2

Al Ahly (Egypt)	1–1	(Morocco) Wydad AC
Zakaria 3'	Report	Bencharki 16'

Borg El Arab Stadium, Alexandria
Attendance: 60,000
Referee: Bamlak Tessema Weyesa (Ethiopia)
4 November 2017
20:00 UTC+0

Wydad AC (Morocco)	1–0	(Egypt) Al Ahly
El Karti 69'	Report

Stade Mohammed V, Casablanca
Attendance: 65,000
Referee: Bakary Gassama (Gambia)

Wydad Casablanca won 2–1 on aggregate.

== Top goalscorers ==
Team eliminated / inactive for this round.

Rank	Player	Team	MD1	MD2	MD3	MD4	MD5	MD6	QF1	QF2	SF1	SF2	F1	F2	Total
1	(Tunisia) Taha Yassine Khenissi	(Tunisia) ES Tunis	1		2		2		1	1					7
2	(Morocco) Achraf Bencharki	(Morocco) Wydad AC					1	1				2	1		5
3	(Morocco) Walid Azaro	(Egypt) Al Ahly							1			3			4
3	(Algeria) Oussama Darfalou	(Algeria) USM Alger	1					2	1						4
3	(Rwanda) Tady Etekiama	(Democratic Republic of the Congo) AS Vita Club				2	2								4
6	(Brazil) Diogo Acosta	(Tunisia) Étoile du Sahel	2	1											3
6	(Nigeria) Junior Ajayi	(Egypt) Al Ahly		1	1					1					3
6	(Zimbabwe) Brian Amidu	(Zimbabwe) CAPS United					2	1							3
6	(Algeria) Farouk Chafaï	(Algeria) USM Alger	1		1		1								3
6	(Zimbabwe) Ronald Chitiyo	(Zimbabwe) CAPS United		2		1									3
6	(Morocco) Walid El Karti	(Morocco) Wydad AC				1						1		1	3
6	(Zimbabwe) Ronald Pfumbidzai	(Zimbabwe) CAPS United			1	1	1								3
6	(Egypt) Moamen Zakaria	(Egypt) Al Ahly		1	1								1		3

== Prize money ==
In 2017, the fixed amount of prize money paid to the clubs is as follows:

Final position	Money awarded to club	National Association share 5%
Winner	US$2,500,000	US$125,000
Runners-up	US$1,250,000	US$62,500
Semi-finalists	US$800,000	US$40,000
Quarter-finalists	US$650,000	US$32,500
3rd in group stage	US$550,000	US$27,500
4th in group stage	US$550,000	US$27,500

== See also ==
- 2017 CAF Confederation Cup
- 2017 FIFA Club World Cup
- 2018 CAF Super Cup
