= 2017 CAF Champions League group stage =

- Dates: 12 May – 9 July 2017

Tournament statistics
- Matches played: 46
- Goals scored: 106 (2.3 per match)

The 2017 CAF Champions League group stage was played from 12 May to 9 July 2017. A total of 16 teams competed in the group stage to decide the eight places in the knockout stage of the 2017 CAF Champions League.

== Draw ==
The draw for the group stage was held on 26 April 2017, 14:00 EET (UTC+2), at the CAF Headquarters in Cairo, Egypt. The 16 teams, all winners of the first round of qualifying, were drawn into four groups of four. The teams were seeded by their performances in the CAF competitions for the previous five seasons (CAF 5-year ranking points shown in parentheses).

Pot	Pot 1	Pot 2	Pot 3	Pot 4
Teams	(Egypt) Al Ahly (45 pts); (Egypt) Zamalek (36 pts); (Tunisia) Étoile du Sahel (31 pts); (South Africa) Mamelodi Sundowns (25 pts)	(Sudan) Al-Hilal (20 pts); (Tunisia) Espérance de Tunis (20 pts); (Morocco) Wydad AC (16 pts); (Algeria) USM Alger (16 pts)	(Sudan) Al-Merrikh (14 pts); (Cameroon) Coton Sport (12 pts); (Democratic Republic of the Congo) AS Vita Club (12 pts); (Libya) Al-Ahli Tripoli (5 pts)	(Ethiopia) Saint George (2 pts); (Mozambique) Ferroviário Beira; (Zambia) Zanaco; (Zimbabwe) CAPS United

== Format ==
In the group stage, each group was played on a home-and-away round-robin basis. The winners and runners-up of each group advanced to the quarter-finals of the knockout stage.

=== Tiebreakers ===
The teams were ranked according to points (3 points for a win, 1 point for a draw, 0 points for a loss). If tied on points, tiebreakers were applied in the following order (Regulations III. 20 & 21):

1. Points in head-to-head matches among tied teams;
2. Goal difference in head-to-head matches among tied teams;
3. Goals scored in head-to-head matches among tied teams;
4. Away goals scored in head-to-head matches among tied teams;
5. If more than two teams are tied, and after applying all head-to-head criteria above, a subset of teams are still tied, all head-to-head criteria above are reapplied exclusively to this subset of teams;
6. Goal difference in all group matches;
7. Goals scored in all group matches;
8. Away goals scored in all group matches;
9. Drawing of lots.

== Schedule ==
The schedule of each matchday was as follows (matches scheduled in midweek in italics).

Matchday	Dates	Matches
Matchday 1	12–14 May 2017	Team 1 vs. Team 4, Team 2 vs. Team 3
Matchday 2	23–24 May 2017	Team 3 vs. Team 1, Team 4 vs. Team 2
Matchday 3	2–4 June 2017	Team 4 vs. Team 3, Team 1 vs. Team 2
Matchday 4	20–21 June 2017	Team 3 vs. Team 4, Team 2 vs. Team 1
Matchday 5	30 June – 2 July 2017	Team 4 vs. Team 1, Team 3 vs. Team 2
Matchday 6	7–9 July 2017	Team 1 vs. Team 3, Team 2 vs. Team 4

== Groups ==
=== Group A ===
Pos	Team	Pld	W	D	L	GF	GA	GD	Pts	Qualification	ESS	CFB	MER	HIL
1	(Tunisia) Étoile du Sahel	6	3	3	0	13	4	+9	12	Quarter-finals	—	5–0	3–0 (awd.) (Note: FIFA suspended the Sudan Football Association on 7 July 2017. As a result, both Al-Hilal and Al-Merrikh could not play their final group matches against Ferroviário Beira and Étoile du Sahel respectively, and the matches were awarded as 3–0 wins to their opponents.)	1–1
2	(Mozambique) Ferroviário Beira	6	2	2	2	6	8	−2	8	Quarter-finals	1–1	—	1–0	0–0
3	(Sudan) Al-Merrikh	6	2	1	3	6	9	−3	7		1–2	2–1	—	2–1
4	(Sudan) Al-Hilal	6	0	4	2	4	8	−4	4		1–1	0–3 (awd.)	1–1	—

Source: CAF
Rules for classification: Group stage tiebreakers
Notes:
12 May 2017
18:00 UTC+1

Étoile du Sahel (Tunisia)	5–0	(Mozambique) Ferroviário Beira
Diogo Acosta 15', 70'; Bangoura 37'; Lahmar 58'; Bouazza 60'	Report

Stade Olympique de Sousse, Sousse
Referee: Juste Ephrem Zio (Burkina Faso)
12 May 2017
22:00 UTC+3

Al-Hilal (Sudan)	1–1	(Sudan) Al-Merrikh
Azeez 31'	Report	Saadeldin 61'

Al-Hilal Stadium, Omdurman
Referee: Daniel Bennett (South Africa)

23 May 2017
15:00 UTC+2

Ferroviário Beira (Mozambique)	0–0	(Sudan) Al-Hilal
	Report

Estádio do Zimpeto, Maputo
Referee: Wisdom Chewe (Zambia)
23 May 2017
21:00 UTC+3

Al-Merrikh (Sudan)	1–2	(Tunisia) Étoile du Sahel
Al-Madina 52'	Report	Diogo Acosta 34'; Bouazza 90+3'

Al-Merrikh Stadium, Omdurman
Referee: Rédouane Jiyed (Morocco)

3 June 2017
15:00 UTC+2

Ferroviário Beira (Mozambique)	1–0	(Sudan) Al-Merrikh
Dayo 67'	Report

Estádio do Chiveve, Beira
Referee: Hélder Martins de Carvalho (Angola)
3 June 2017
22:45 UTC+1

Étoile du Sahel (Tunisia)	1–1	(Sudan) Al-Hilal
Boughattas 57'	Report	Idris 80'

Stade Olympique de Sousse, Sousse
Referee: Mohamed Maarouf (Egypt)

20 June 2017
23:00 UTC+3

Al-Merrikh (Sudan)	2–1	(Mozambique) Ferroviário Beira
Saadeldin 31'; Abdalla 59'	Report	Maninho 16'

Al-Merrikh Stadium, Omdurman
Referee: Bamlak Tessema Weyesa (Ethiopia)
21 June 2017
22:00 UTC+3

Al-Hilal (Sudan)	1–1	(Tunisia) Étoile du Sahel
Bashir 90+1'	Report	Bedoui 86'

Al-Hilal Stadium, Omdurman
Referee: Hamada Nampiandraza (Madagascar)

30 June 2017
21:00 UTC+3

Al-Merrikh (Sudan)	2–1	(Sudan) Al-Hilal
Rahman 9', 48'	Report	Idris 65'

Al-Merrikh Stadium, Omdurman
Referee: Sidi Alioum (Cameroon)
1 July 2017
15:00 UTC+2

Ferroviário Beira (Mozambique)	1–1	(Tunisia) Étoile du Sahel
Chelito 72'	Report	Ben Belgacem 84' (pen.)

Estádio do Chiveve, Beira
Referee: Mahamadou Keita (Mali)

7 July 2017
18:00 UTC+1

Étoile du Sahel (Tunisia)	3–0 Awarded	(Sudan) Al-Merrikh
	Report

Stade Olympique de Sousse, Sousse
Referee: Janny Sikazwe (Zambia)
7 July 2017
20:00 UTC+3

Al-Hilal (Sudan)	0–3 Awarded	(Mozambique) Ferroviário Beira
	Report

Al-Hilal Stadium, Omdurman
Referee: Denis Dembélé (Ivory Coast)

=== Group B ===
Pos	Team	Pld	W	D	L	GF	GA	GD	Pts	Qualification	USM	AHT	ZAM	CAP
1	(Algeria) USM Alger	6	3	2	1	12	5	+7	11	Quarter-finals	—	3–0	2–0	4–1
2	(Libya) Al-Ahli Tripoli	6	2	3	1	11	10	+1	9	Quarter-finals	1–1	—	0–0	4–2
3	(Egypt) Zamalek	6	1	3	2	6	8	−2	6 (Note: Head-to-head results: Zamalek 2–0 CAPS United, CAPS United 3–1 Zamalek (Zamalek won on away goals).)		1–1	2–2	—	2–0
4	(Zimbabwe) CAPS United	6	2	0	4	10	16	−6	6		2–1	2–4	3–1	—

Source: CAF
Rules for classification: Group stage tiebreakers
Notes:
12 May 2017
18:00 UTC+1

USM Alger (Algeria)	3–0	(Libya) Al-Ahli Tripoli
Chafaï 31'; Carolus 45+1'; Darfalou 83'	Report

Stade du 5 Juillet, Algiers
Referee: Youssef Essrayri (Tunisia)
12 May 2017
21:00 UTC+2

Zamalek (Egypt)	2–0	(Zimbabwe) CAPS United
Morsy 56'; Ohawuchi 83'	Report

Borg El Arab Stadium, Alexandria
Referee: Denis Dembélé (Ivory Coast)

23 May 2017
19:00 UTC+1

Al-Ahli Tripoli (Libya)	0–0	(Egypt) Zamalek
	Report

Stade Taïeb Mhiri, Sfax (Tunisia) (Note: Teams from Libya were not allowed to host their home matches in their country due to security concerns.)
Referee: Noureddine El Jaafari (Morocco)
24 May 2017
15:00 UTC+2

CAPS United (Zimbabwe)	2–1	(Algeria) USM Alger
Chitiyo 16', 81'	Report	Abdellaoui 67'

National Sports Stadium, Harare
Referee: Thierry Nkurunziza (Burundi)

2 June 2017
15:00 UTC+2

CAPS United (Zimbabwe)	2–4	(Libya) Al-Ahli Tripoli
Pfumbidzai 87' (pen.); Zvirekwi 90'	Report	Derbali 17' (pen.), 81'; Ablo 19'; Ellafi 25'

National Sports Stadium, Harare
Referee: Davies Omweno (Kenya)
2 June 2017
22:00 UTC+2

Zamalek (Egypt)	1–1	(Algeria) USM Alger
Mayuka 90+4'	Report	Chafaï 30'

Borg El Arab Stadium, Alexandria
Referee: Ali Lemghaifry (Mauritania)

21 June 2017
22:00 UTC+1

Al-Ahli Tripoli (Libya)	4–2	(Zimbabwe) CAPS United
Al Taher 15', 46'; Al Ghanodi 55'; Ellafi 63'	Report	Pfumbidzai 19'; Chitiyo 42'

Stade Taïeb Mhiri, Sfax (Tunisia)
Referee: Joshua Bondo (Botswana)
21 June 2017
23:00 UTC+1

USM Alger (Algeria)	2–0	(Egypt) Zamalek
Bellahcene 44'; Meziane 87'	Report

Stade du 5 Juillet, Algiers
Referee: Victor Gomes (South Africa)

30 June 2017
19:00 UTC+1

Al-Ahli Tripoli (Libya)	1–1	(Algeria) USM Alger
Saltou 38'	Report	Chafaï 16'

Stade Taïeb Mhiri, Sfax (Tunisia)
Referee: Bamlak Tessema Weyesa (Ethiopia)
2 July 2017
15:00 UTC+2

CAPS United (Zimbabwe)	3–1	(Egypt) Zamalek
Pfumbidzai 31'; Amidu 75', 90+4'	Report	Ohawuchi 44'

National Sports Stadium, Harare
Referee: Hélder Martins de Carvalho (Angola)

9 July 2017
21:00 UTC+2

Zamalek (Egypt)	2–2	(Libya) Al-Ahli Tripoli
Morsy 13'; Youssef 75'	Report	Al Ghanodi 45+3' (pen.); Mabidé 69'

Borg El Arab Stadium, Alexandria
Attendance: 30,000
Referee: Hamada Nampiandraza (Madagascar)
9 July 2017
20:00 UTC+1

USM Alger (Algeria)	4–1	(Zimbabwe) CAPS United
Hammar 36'; Hamzaoui 42'; Darfalou 78', 88'	Report	Amidu 81'

Stade du 5 Juillet, Algiers
Attendance: 52,000
Referee: Malang Diedhiou (Senegal)

=== Group C ===
Pos	Team	Pld	W	D	L	GF	GA	GD	Pts	Qualification	EST	MSD	STG	VIT
1	(Tunisia) Espérance de Tunis	6	3	3	0	11	4	+7	12	Quarter-finals	—	0–0	4–0	3–1
2	(South Africa) Mamelodi Sundowns	6	2	3	1	6	4	+2	9	Quarter-finals	1–2	—	0–0	1–1
3	(Ethiopia) Saint George	6	1	2	3	2	7	−5	5 (Note: Head-to-head results: Saint George 1–0 AS Vita Club, AS Vita Club 2–1 Saint George (Saint George won on away goals).)		0–0	0–1	—	1–0
4	(Democratic Republic of the Congo) AS Vita Club	6	1	2	3	7	11	−4	5		2–2	1–3	2–1	—

Source: CAF
Rules for classification: Group stage tiebreakers
Notes:
12 May 2017
16:00 UTC+1

Espérance de Tunis (Tunisia)	3–1	(Democratic Republic of the Congo) AS Vita Club
Coulibaly 20'; Khenissi 26' (pen.); Badri 87'	Report	Atouba 10'

Stade Olympique de Radès, Tunis
Referee: Ali Lemghaifry (Mauritania)
13 May 2017
17:00 UTC+2

Mamelodi Sundowns (South Africa)	0–0	(Ethiopia) Saint George
	Report

Lucas Masterpieces Moripe Stadium, Pretoria
Referee: Mohamed El Hanafy (Egypt)

23 May 2017
16:00 UTC+3

Saint George (Ethiopia)	0–0	(Tunisia) Espérance de Tunis
	Report

Addis Ababa Stadium, Addis Ababa
Referee: Joshua Bondo (Botswana)
24 May 2017
15:30 UTC+1

AS Vita Club (Democratic Republic of the Congo)	1–3	(South Africa) Mamelodi Sundowns
Sidibé 32'	Report	Laffor 25'; Zakri 57'; Vilakazi 78'

Stade des Martyrs, Kinshasa
Referee: Bakary Gassama (Gambia)

2 June 2017
20:00 UTC+2

Mamelodi Sundowns (South Africa)	1–2	(Tunisia) Espérance de Tunis
Vilakazi 21'	Report	Khenissi 6', 90' (pen.)

Lucas Masterpieces Moripe Stadium, Pretoria
Referee: Maguette N'Diaye (Senegal)
4 June 2017
16:00 UTC+3

Saint George (Ethiopia)	1–0	(Democratic Republic of the Congo) AS Vita Club
Saladin 60'	Report

Addis Ababa Stadium, Addis Ababa
Referee: Louis Hakizimana (Rwanda)

20 June 2017
15:00 UTC+1

AS Vita Club (Democratic Republic of the Congo)	2–1	(Ethiopia) Saint George
Etekiama 7', 28' (pen.)	Report	Saladin 66'

Stade des Martyrs, Kinshasa
Referee: Janny Sikazwe (Zambia)
21 June 2017
22:00 UTC+1

Espérance de Tunis (Tunisia)	0–0	(South Africa) Mamelodi Sundowns
	Report

Stade Olympique de Radès, Tunis
Referee: Thierry Nkurunziza (Burundi)

1 July 2017
16:00 UTC+3

Saint George (Ethiopia)	0–1	(South Africa) Mamelodi Sundowns
	Report	Laffor 85'

Addis Ababa Stadium, Addis Ababa
Referee: Mehdi Abid Charef (Algeria)
1 July 2017
16:00 UTC+1

AS Vita Club (Democratic Republic of the Congo)	2–2	(Tunisia) Espérance de Tunis
Etekiama 24', 30'	Report	Khenissi 11', 59' (pen.)

Stade des Martyrs, Kinshasa
Referee: Eric Otogo-Castane (Gabon)

9 July 2017
19:00 UTC+2

Mamelodi Sundowns (South Africa)	1–1	(Democratic Republic of the Congo) AS Vita Club
Nthethe 35'	Report	Atouba 73'

Lucas Masterpieces Moripe Stadium, Pretoria
Referee: Noureddine El Jaafari (Morocco)
9 July 2017
18:00 UTC+1

Espérance de Tunis (Tunisia)	4–0	(Ethiopia) Saint George
Chemmam 29'; Mejri 36'; Jouini 82'; Machani 90+4'	Report

Stade Olympique de Radès, Tunis
Referee: Janny Sikazwe (Zambia)

=== Group D ===
Pos	Team	Pld	W	D	L	GF	GA	GD	Pts	Qualification	WAC	AHL	ZAN	COT
1	(Morocco) Wydad AC	6	4	0	2	7	3	+4	12	Quarter-finals	—	2–0	1–0	2–0
2	(Egypt) Al Ahly	6	3	2	1	7	3	+4	11 (Note: Head-to-head results: Al-Ahly 0–0 Zanaco, Zanaco 0–0 Al-Ahly (tied on head-to-head results, ranked on total goal difference).)	Quarter-finals	2–0	—	0–0	3–1
3	(Zambia) Zanaco	6	3	2	1	4	2	+2	11		1–0	0–0	—	2–1
4	(Cameroon) Coton Sport	6	0	0	6	2	12	−10	0		0–2	0–2	0–1	—

Source: CAF
Rules for classification: Group stage tiebreakers
Notes:
12 May 2017
21:00 UTC+1

Wydad AC (Morocco)	2–0	(Cameroon) Coton Sport
Jebor 39'; Attouchi 63'	Report

Stade Mohamed V, Casablanca
Referee: Hélder Martins de Carvalho (Angola)
13 May 2017
19:00 UTC+2

Al-Ahly (Egypt)	0–0	(Zambia) Zanaco
	Report

Borg El Arab Stadium, Alexandria
Referee: Bakary Gassama (Gambia)

23 May 2017
16:00 UTC+1

Coton Sport (Cameroon)	0–2	(Egypt) Al-Ahly
	Report	Ajayi 12'; Zakaria 14'

Roumdé Adjia Stadium, Garoua
Referee: Victor Gomes (South Africa)
24 May 2017
15:00 UTC+2

Zanaco (Zambia)	1–0	(Morocco) Wydad AC
Mbewe 13'	Report

National Heroes Stadium, Lusaka
Referee: Louis Hakizimana (Rwanda)

3 June 2017
15:00 UTC+2

Zanaco (Zambia)	2–1	(Cameroon) Coton Sport
Sakala 9'; Mpiana 85'	Report	Souleymanou 25'

National Heroes Stadium, Lusaka
Referee: Abou Coulibaly (Ivory Coast)
4 June 2017
23:00 UTC+2

Al-Ahly (Egypt)	2–0	(Morocco) Wydad AC
Zakaria 24'; Ajayi 79'	Report

Borg El Arab Stadium, Alexandria
Attendance: 10,000
Referee: Youssef Essrayri (Tunisia)

20 June 2017
23:00 UTC+0

Wydad AC (Morocco)	2–0	(Egypt) Al-Ahly
Ondama 48'; El Karti 78'	Report

Stade Mohamed V, Casablanca
Referee: Mehdi Abid Charef (Algeria)
21 June 2017
15:00 UTC+1

Coton Sport (Cameroon)	0–1	(Zambia) Zanaco
	Report	Sakala 90+1'

Roumdé Adjia Stadium, Garoua
Referee: Eric Otogo-Castane (Gabon)

1 July 2017
15:00 UTC+2

Zanaco (Zambia)	0–0	(Egypt) Al-Ahly
	Report

National Heroes Stadium, Lusaka
Referee: Ali Lemghaifry (Mauritania)
1 July 2017
16:00 UTC+1

Coton Sport (Cameroon)	0–2	(Morocco) Wydad AC
	Report	Bencharki 43'; Aarab 72'

Roumdé Adjia Stadium, Garoua
Referee: Davies Omweno (Kenya)

8 July 2017
21:00 UTC+2

Al-Ahly (Egypt)	3–1	(Cameroon) Coton Sport
Gamal 15', 54'; Said 33'	Report	Fathy 12' (o.g.)

Borg El Arab Stadium, Alexandria
Attendance: 25,000
Referee: Ferdinand Udoh (Nigeria)
8 July 2017
20:00 UTC+1

Wydad AC (Morocco)	1–0	(Zambia) Zanaco
Bencharki 68'	Report

Stade Mohamed V, Casablanca
Referee: Bakary Gassama (Gambia)
