= Taonga Bwembya =

Zambian footballer (born 1995)

Personal information
- Date of birth: 11 June 1995 (age 31)
- Place of birth: Zambia
- Positions: Midfielder; defender

Team information
- Current team: Forest Rangers F.C.

Senior career*
Years	Team	Apps	(Gls)
–2017	Mufulira Wanderers		
2017–2020	Zanaco		
2020-	Forest Rangers F.C.		

International career^{‡}
2015	Zambia U23	0	(0)
2017–	Zambia	1	(0)
- * Club domestic league appearances and goals ‡ National team caps and goals as of 11 May 2019

Taonga Bwembya (born 11 June 1995) is a Zambian footballer who plays as a midfielder for Forest Rangers F.C. and the Zambia national team.

== Playing career ==
=== Club career ===
Bwembya was instrumental in leading his club to a second-place finish in the Zambian Division One in 2014, achieving promotion to the Super League after a nine-year hiatus. He followed this up by leading the club to an impressive fifth place Super League finish in his first season as captain. Ahead of the 2016 season, the star defender turned down offers from several top-flight clubs. That year, the Wanderers saw four different managers lead the team, and they barely avoided relegation. Bwembya attributed their poor play to the "frequent changes that have been made to the technical bench."

After captaining the Wanderers for two years, he joined Zanaco ahead of the 2017 season. His competitive debut with the team came in February, during the first qualifying round of the 2017 CAF Champions League. Bwembya was named Fans' Player of the Match in Zanaco's scoreless first-leg draw against Rwandan champions APR. In the second-leg, he scored the lone goal in Zanaco's 1–0 victory to secure their spot in the next round. This also happened to be his first goal with the club. They defeated Tanzanian club Young Africans after that to qualify for the group stage. On the last matchday of the group stage, with Zanaco needing a single point to advance, Bwembya was sent off during their fixture against Wydad Casablanca. Ten minutes later, Wydad scored, securing their advancement as Zanaco finished third and was eliminated on goal difference. He was named team captain ahead of the 2019 season.

=== International career ===
Bwembya was named to the 21-man squad selected to play at the 2015 Africa U-23 Cup of Nations in Senegal, although he made no appearances as Zambia saw a group stage elimination.

He made his senior international debut for Zambia on 26 March 2017 during a friendly against Zimbabwe, playing the entire 90 minutes of the 0–0 draw in Harare.

== International statistics ==
As of match played 26 March 2017.

National team	Year	Apps	Goals
Zambia	2017	1	0
Total		1	0

== Personal life ==
Bwembya, who was raised in Mufulira, supported Mufulira Wanderers F.C. growing up.
