= John Chea Jaysay =

Liberian footballer

Personal information
- Full name: John Chea Jaysay
- Date of birth: 27 November 1999 (age 26)
- Place of birth: Monrovia, Liberia
- Height: 1.72 m (5 ft 8 in)
- Position: Midfielder

Team information
- Current team: FC Bea Mountain
- Number: 8

Senior career*
Years	Team	Apps	(Gls)
2013–2016	Keitrace FC	34	(5)
2016–2017	FC Fassell	14	(1)
2018–2019	Barrack Young Controllers	21	(1)
2019–	FC Bea Mountain	17	(3)

International career
2017	Liberia U20	4	(0)
2017	Liberia	2	(0)
- * Club domestic league appearances and goals

John Chea Jaysay (born 27 November 1999) is a Liberian footballer who plays as a midfielder for FC Bea Mountain. He made two appearances for the Liberia national team in 2017.

== Club career ==
Jaysay joined Liberian Premier League side Keitrace FC for the 2013–14 season. He left and joined FC Fassell during the 2016–17 Liberian First Division League season.

He joined Barrack Young Controllers on a season-long deal in 2018.

In January 2019, he joined newly promoted Liberian Premier League club Bea Mountain on a two-year deal.

== International career ==
Jaysay has represented the Liberian under-20 team.

He made his international senior debut for Liberia in a 2018 African Nations Championship qualification qualifying match against Mauritania on 16 July 2017.
