= 2013–14 Liberian First Division League =

LFA-Cellcom First Division
- Season: 2013–14
- Matches: 60
- Goals: 136 (2.27 per match)
- Biggest home win: Oilers 6–2 MB Angels (15 December 2013)
- Biggest away win: Red Lions 1–5 Oilers (27 October 2013)
- Highest scoring: Oilers 6–2 MB Angels (15 December 2013)
- Longest winning run: 3 games Oilers
- Longest unbeaten run: 5 games BYC; Watanga
- Longest winless run: 6 games MB Angels
- Longest losing run: 5 games MB Angels
- All statistics correct as of 18 December 2013. Note: Walkovers counted in matches played but not counted in goals scored.

The 2013–14 Liberian First Division League (known as the LFA-Cellcom First Division League for sponsorship reasons) is the 41st season of the Liberian Premier League, the Liberian professional league for association football clubs, since the league's establishment in 1956. The season was expected to start on Sunday 20 October 2013 but was pushed back to commence on Sunday, 27 October 2013 instead. The 2013–2014 season concluded on Sunday 23 February 2014. The fixtures were announced on 12 October 2013.

== Teams ==
A total of 12 teams are contesting the league, including 10 sides from the 2013 season and two promoted from the 2013 Second Division League. On 24 July 2013, NPA Anchors and Keitrace FC earned promotion from the 2013 Second Division League. Keitrace FC claimed a promotion place, after finishing second behind Barrack Young Controllers II – a feeder side of Barrack Young Controllers. Keitrace FC will be playing in the First Division for the first time while NPA Anchors would be returning to the top flight after they were relegated during the 2012 Liberian Premier League season.

The two teams replaced Gedi & Sons F.C. and Nimba United F.C. who were both relegated to the Second Division.

=== Stadia and locations ===
Locations of the 2013–14 First Division teams

Team	Town	Stadium	Capacity
Barrack Young Controllers	Monrovia	The Blue Field	3,000
Fatu F.C.(now Red Lions FC)	Kakata	Nancy B. Doe Stadium	9,500
Ganta Black Stars	Ganta	Ganta Sports Stadium	2,000
Invincible Eleven	Monrovia	ATS	10,000
Jubilee FC	Monrovia	ATS	10,000
Keitrace FC	Monrovia	The Blue Field	3,000
LISCR F.C.	Monrovia	ATS	10,000
LPRC Oilers	Monrovia	ATS	10,000
Mighty Blue Angels	Unification Town	Unification Town Sports Stadium	2,000
MC Breweries	Monrovia	D. Tweh Sports Stadium	1,000
NPA Anchor	Monrovia	ATS	10,000
Watanga F.C.	Harbel	Harbel Sports Stadium	1,000

Note: Fatu FC were acquired by Ghana's Red Lions FC on 5 November, hence the name change on all fixtures.

=== Personnel ===
Note: Flags indicate national team as has been defined under FIFA eligibility rules. Players may hold more than one non-FIFA nationality.

Team	Coach^{1}
Barrack Young Controllers	Robert Lartey
Fatu F.C.(Red Lions)	
Ganta Black Stars	William Pennoh
Invincible Eleven	Papa Kamara
Jubilee F.C.	William Wleh
Keitrace F.C.	William Fanciah
LISCR FC	Gabriel Johns
LPRC Oilers	Thomas Apumah
Mighty Blue Angels	
Monrovia Club Breweries	Francis Sarploh
NPA Anchors	Jerry Anderson
Watanga F.C.	Christian Thompson

== League table ==
Pos	Team	Pld	W	D	L	GF	GA	GD	Pts	Qualification or relegation
1	LISCR	10	6	2	2	15	8	+7	20	Qualification for 2015 CAF Champions League
2	MC Breweries	10	5	3	2	12	7	+5	18	
3	LPRC Oilers	10	5	2	3	18	10	+8	17	
4	Invincible Eleven	10	5	2	3	9	7	+2	17	
5	Barrack Young Controllers	10	4	4	2	14	8	+6	16	
6	Keitrace FC	10	4	3	3	10	8	+2	15	
7	NPA Anchors	10	4	3	3	10	10	0	15	
8	Watanga	10	2	6	2	11	11	0	12	
9	Jubilee FC	10	2	4	4	9	11	−2	10	
10	Red Lions FC (R)	10	2	3	5	9	15	−6	9	Relegation to LFA-Cellcom Second Division
11	Ganta Black Stars (R)	10	2	2	6	9	17	−8	8	Relegation to LFA-Cellcom Second Division
12	MB Angels (R)	10	1	2	7	10	24	−14	5	Relegation to LFA-Cellcom Second Division

Updated to match(es) played on 18 December 2013. Source: http://www.leaguewebsite.co.uk/lfaleagues/Divisions
Rules for classification: 1) points; 2) goal difference; 3) number of goals scored.
(R) Relegated

Winner of the 2013–14 Liberian FA Cup will qualify for the 2015 CAF Confederation Cup.

== Season statistics ==
=== Scoring ===
- First goal of the season: Christopher Jackson for Keitrace FC against Barrack Young Controllers (27 October 2013)
- Largest winning margin: 4 goals
  - Red Lions FC 1–5 LPRC Oilers (27 October 2013)
  - Barrack Young Controllers 5–1 Mighty Blue Angels (2 November 2013)
  - LPRC Oilers 6–2 Mighty Blue Angels (15 December 2013)
- Highest scoring game: 8 goals
  - LPRC Oilers 6–2 Mighty Blue Angels (15 December 2013)
- Most goals scored in a match by a single team: 6 goals
  - LPRC Oilers 6–2 Mighty Blue Angels (15 December 2013)
- Most goals scored in a match by a losing team: 2 goals
  - NPA Anchors 3–2 Jubilee FC (2 November 2013)
  - Mighty Blue Angels 2–3 Red Lions FC (13 November 2013)
  - LPRC Oilers 6–2 Mighty Blue Angels (15 December 2013)

==== Top scorers ====
Note: Players with same number of goals sorted by lastname

Rank	Player	Nationality	Team	Goals
1	George Kekulah	Liberian	LPRC Oilers	5
2	Fred Brooks	Liberian	Keitrace FC	2
3	George Dauda	Liberian	BYC FC	2
4	Kelvin Kollie	Liberian	Invincible Eleven	2
5	Sylvanus Nimely	Liberian	MC Breweries	2
6	James Soto Roberts	Liberia	LPRC Oilers	2
7	Nuzon Martor	Liberian	Jubilee FC	2
Note: All other goal scorers in the 2013–2014 LFA-Cellcom First Division League have scored one goal each. Last updated: LFA-Cellcom First Division League Match-Day (4), 6 November 2013.

=== Clean sheets ===
==== Player ====
Note: Players with same number of clean sheets sorted by lastname

==== Club ====
- Most clean sheets: 4
  - Monrovia Club Breweries

=== Discipline ===
==== Player ====
- Most yellow cards:
- Most red cards: 1
  - Charles Togba (NPA Anchors)
  - Joseph Hina (Invincible Eleven)
  - Prince Mulbah (Mighty Blue Angels)

==== Club ====
- Most yellow cards:
- Most red cards: 1
  - NPA Anchors
  - Invincible Eleven
  - Mighty Blue Angels

== See also ==
- Liberian Premier League
- Liberia Football Association
