= 2016 Liberian First Division League =

LFA-Cellcom First Division
- Season: 2015–16
- Matches: 5
- Goals: 17 (3.4 per match)
- Top goalscorer: Junior Barshall; Justino Jackson (2 goals)
- Biggest away win: Keitrace FC 0-4 BYC (24 January 2016)
- All statistics correct as of 24 January 2016. Note: Walkovers counted in matches played but not counted in goals scored.

The 2016 Liberian First Division League (known as the LFA-Cellcom First Division League for sponsorship reasons) is the 43rd season of the Liberian Premier League, the Liberian professional league for association football clubs, since the league's establishment in 1956.

The season was expected to start on Thursday 10 December 2015 but was postponed because some clubs had not completed the CAF Club Licensing criteria. The season finally commenced on 23 January 2016.

== Teams ==
A total of 10 teams are contesting the league, including seven sides from the 2015 season and three promoted from the 2015 Second Division League. On 20 & 27 September 2015, Mighty Dragons FC and ELWA United FC both earned promotion from the 2015 Second Division League after playing each other in a two-legged Second Division Championship Playoff with Mighty Dragons being crowned Second Division Champions after a 3–2 aggregate win. Holder FC also claimed a promotion place, after defeating Mighty Blue Angels in the Promotion Playoff.

The three teams replaced Jubilee FC, Aries FC, and MC Breweries who were relegated to the Second Division.

Two other First Division Clubs: I.E. and NPA Anchor were denied participation for the 2015–16 season due to their failure to meet the statutory requirements in the Club Licensing System.

=== Stadia and locations ===
Locations of the 2015–16 First Division teams

| Clubs | Location | stadium | capacity |
|---|---|---|---|
| Barrack Young Controllers | Monrovia | The Blue Field | 3,000 |
| ELWA United | Monrovia | ATS | 10,000 |
| FC Fassell | Monrovia | ATS | 10,000 |
| Holder FC | Monrovia | ATS | 10,000 |
| Keitrace FC | Monrovia | ATS | 10,000 |
| LISCR F.C. | Monrovia | ATS | 10,000 |
| LPRC Oilers | Monrovia | ATS | 10,000 |
| Mighty Dragons FC | Gbarnga | Gbarnga Sports Stadium | 2,000 |
| Nimba United | Mt. Barclay | NorthStar Sports Stadium | 1,000 |
| Watanga F.C. | Monrovia | ATS | 10,000 |

=== Personnel ===
Note: Flags indicate national team as has been defined under FIFA eligibility rules. Players may hold more than one non-FIFA nationality.

| Team | Coach^{1} |
|---|---|
| Barrack Young Controllers | Cooper Sannor |
| ELWA United | TBA TBA |
| FC Fassell | Sam Chebli |
| Holder F.C. | TBA TBA |
| Keitrace F.C. | TBA TBA |
| LISCR FC | Robert Lartey |
| LPRC Oilers | Gabriel Johns |
| Mighty Dragons | TBA TBA |
| Nimba United | Kollie Korvey |
| Watanga F.C. | TBA TBA |

== League table ==
| Pos | Team | Pld | W | D | L | GF | GA | GD | Pts | Qualification or relegation |
|---|---|---|---|---|---|---|---|---|---|---|
| 1 | Barrack Young Controllers (C) | 20 | 15 | 4 | 1 | 44 | 12 | +32 | 49 | Qualification for 2017 CAF Champions League |
| 2 | FC Fassell | 20 | 11 | 5 | 4 | 35 | 22 | +13 | 38 | |
| 3 | Nimba United | 20 | 9 | 5 | 6 | 27 | 22 | +5 | 32 | |
| 4 | Watanga | 20 | 7 | 8 | 5 | 30 | 22 | +8 | 29 | |
| 5 | LISCR | 20 | 7 | 6 | 7 | 28 | 22 | +6 | 27 | |
| 6 | LPRC Oilers | 20 | 5 | 9 | 6 | 18 | 19 | −1 | 24 | |
| 7 | ELWA United | 20 | 6 | 4 | 10 | 20 | 29 | −9 | 22 | |
| 8 | Keitrace | 20 | 6 | 5 | 9 | 24 | 33 | −9 | 21 (Note: 2 points deducted?) | |
| 9 | Mighty Dragons | 19 | 5 | 4 | 10 | 18 | 39 | −21 | 19 | Relegation to LFA-Cellcom Second Division |
| 10 | NPA Anchors | 20 | 3 | 9 | 8 | 16 | 24 | −8 | 18 | Relegation to LFA-Cellcom Second Division |
| 11 | Holder | 20 | 3 | 6 | 11 | 21 | 36 | −15 | 15 | Relegation to LFA-Cellcom Second Division |

Updated to match(es) played on 30 April 2016. Source: rsssf.com
Rules for classification: 1) points; 2) goal difference; 3) number of goals scored.
(C) Champions
Notes:

Winner of the 2015–16 Liberian FA Cup will qualify for the 2017 CAF Confederation Cup.

== Season statistics ==
=== Scoring ===
==== Top scorers ====
As of matches played on 24 January 2016.

| Rank | Player | Club | Goals |
|---|---|---|---|
| 1 | (Liberia) Junior Barshall | BYC FC | 2 |
| 1 | (Liberia) Justino Jackson | Holder FC | 2 |
| 3 | (Liberia) Trokon Saykiameh | ELWA United | 1 |
| 3 | (Nigeria) Adetu Evanonye | Nimba United | 1 |
| 3 | (Liberia) Mark Payne | BYC FC | 1 |
| 3 | (Liberia) Dominic Jlateh | LISCR FC | 1 |
| 3 | (Liberia) Chris Jackson | LISCR FC | 1 |
| 3 | (Liberia) Kesselly Kamara | FC Fassell | 1 |
| 3 | (Liberia) Abraham Kwateh | Watanga FC | 1 |
| 3 | (Liberia) Kelvin Potis | Watanga FC | 1 |

==== Clean sheets ====
As of matches played on 24 January 2016.

| Rank | Player | Club | Clean sheets |
|---|---|---|---|
| 1 | (Liberia) Mulbah Urey | BYC FC | 1 |
| 1 | (Liberia) Samson Giddings | FC Fassell | 1 |

=== Discipline ===
As of matches played on 24 January 2016

==== Player ====
- Most yellow cards: 1
  - Patrick Jackson (LPRC Oilers)
  - Sholee Quiah (Nimba United)
  - Wilton Ninneh (Nimba United)
  - Saylee Swen (LPRC Oilers)
  - Trokon Zeon (LPRC Oilers)
- Most red cards: 1
  - Trokon Saykiameh (ELWA United)

==== Club ====
- Most yellow cards: 3
  - LPRC Oilers
- Most red cards: 1
  - ELWA United

== Awards ==
=== Monthly awards ===
| Month | Coach of the Month | | Player of the Month | | Reference |
| Month | Coach | Club | Player | Club | Reference |
|---|---|---|---|---|---|
| January | | | | | |
| February | | | | | |
| March | | | | | |
| April | | | | | |
| May | | | | | |
| June | | | | | |
