= Kemoh =

Kemoh is a given name. Notable people with the name include:

- Kemoh Fadika, Sierra Leonean diplomat
- Kemoh Kamara (born 1995), Liberian footballer
- Kemoh Sesay, Sierra Leonean politician

== See also ==
- Kemo (disambiguation)
