= Adokiye Amiesimaka Stadium =

Sports venue in Port Harcourt, Nigeria

Coordinates: 4°58′3″N 6°58′17″E

Adokiye Amiesimaka Stadium is a multi-use stadium in Port Harcourt, Nigeria, on the north end of the city in the Omagwa neighbourhood. The stadium is named after Adokiye Amiesimaka, a former player with Nigeria's national football team who was among the squad that won the 1980 African Cup of Nations, and has been a former chairman of the Sharks Football Club and a former Attorney General of Rivers State. Presently, the stadium has a capacity of 38,000 people.

It opened on 19 July 2015 with a match between Nigeria and Congo in a qualifier for the Rio Olympics which ended in a 2–1 Nigerian victory.

Later that month, Nigerian Premier League squad Dolphins announced they will play the remainder of the 2015 season in the stadium.

From 25 to 27 January 2019, the stadium was used for a 3-day event tagged, Higher Life Conference with Pastor Chris Oyakhilome. It was filled to capacity and thousands of people sat on the main pitch for this event. The stadium serves as the home ground for Rivers United.

== Renovation ==
The main pitch of the stadium developed undulations that made it impracticable for standard football games to be hosted there. In 2020, a contract was signed for renovation of the main turf, training fields and a total facelift for facilities in the stadium. A decision was also made in 2020 by the Nigerian Federal Government to concession the stadium by 2021 to enable it have better facilities and yield more revenue.

== Matches ==
The stadium has played host to many matches of the Nigerian Professional Football League including the game between Rivers United Football Club and Adamawa United in the 2020/2021 football season, and CAF Champion league between Rivers United and Young African from Tanzania.

== See also ==
- List of stadiums in Nigeria
- Lists of stadiums
