= Abdel Diarra =

Ivorian footballer

Personal information
- Full name: Abdel Rahamane Diarra Khalil
- Date of birth: 28 December 1994 (age 31)
- Place of birth: Divo, Ivory Coast
- Height: 1.88 m (6 ft 2 in)
- Position: Centre-back

Team information
- Current team: Nordic United
- Number: 44

Youth career
- –2010: AFAD Djékanou

Senior career*
Years	Team	Apps	(Gls)
2010–2014	AFAD Djékanou	59	(2)
2015–2016	Strasbourg B	12	(1)
2016–2017	Antalyaspor	1	(0)
2016	→ Karşıyaka (loan)	10	(2)
2017	Syrianska	10	(0)
2017–2018	Beerschot Wilrijk	14	(0)
2019	Syrianska	18	(2)
2020	HB Køge	0	(0)
2020–2021	AFC Eskilstuna	18	(0)
2022–2023	Leixões	0	(0)
2024–	Nordic United	6	(0)

International career
2015	Ivory Coast U23	7	(1)
- * Club domestic league appearances and goals as of 1 January 2025

Abdel Rahamane Diarra Khalil (born 28 December 1994) is an Ivorian professional footballer who plays for Swedish club Nordic United as a centre-back.

== Club career ==
On 21 January 2020, Diarra joined Danish 1st Division club HB Køge on a 2.5-year contract. After terminating his deal with Køge on 30 May 2020 with zero appearances for the club, Diarra returned to Sweden and joined Superettan club AFC Eskilstuna He was released again in July 2021.

== International career ==
Diarra represented Ivory Coast U23s during the 2015 Africa U-23 Cup of Nations qualification matches.

== Career statistics ==
=== Club ===
As of 12 November 2017.

Club	Season	League			Cup		Continental		Other		Total	
Club	Season	Division	Apps	Goals	Apps	Goals	Apps	Goals	Apps	Goals	Apps	Goals
Strasbourg B	2015–16	CFA 2	5	1	0	0	–		0	0	5	1
Antalyaspor	2015–16	Süper Lig	0	0	0	0	–		0	0	0	0
Antalyaspor	2016–17	Süper Lig	0	0	0	0	–		0	0	0	0
Antalyaspor	Total		0	0	0	0	0	0	0	0	0	0
Karşıyaka (loan)	2015–16	TFF First League	10	2	1 (Note: Appearances in the Turkish Cup)	0	–		0	0	11	2
Syrianska	2017	Superettan	10	0	0	0	–		0	0	10	0
Beerschot Wilrijk	2017–18	Proximus League	5	0	1 (Note: Appearances in the Belgian Cup)	0	–		8 (Note: Appearances in the UEFA Europa League Play-offs)	0	14	0
Career total			30	3	2	0	0	0	8	0	40	2
