= 2015 U-23 Africa Cup of Nations qualification =

2015 Africa U-23 Cup of Nations qualification
Tournament details
- Dates: 24 April – 2 August
- Teams: 26 (from 1 confederation)

Tournament statistics
- Matches played: 34
- Goals scored: 69 (2.03 per match)
- Top scorer(s): (Egypt) Kahraba (Mali) Adama Niane (4 goals each)

The 2015 Africa U-23 Cup of Nations qualification was a men's under-23 football competition which decided the participating teams of the 2015 Africa U-23 Cup of Nations. Players born on or after 1 January 1993 were eligible to compete in the tournament.

A total of eight teams qualified to play in the final tournament, including Senegal who qualified automatically as hosts.

The top three teams of the final tournament will qualify for the 2016 Summer Olympics men's football tournament in Brazil.

== Teams ==
A total of 26 CAF member national teams entered the qualifying rounds.

Round	Teams entering round	No. of teams
First round	Botswana; Ghana; Guinea-Bissau; Kenya; Liberia; Libya; Mauritania; Rwanda; Sierra Leone; Somalia	10
Second round	Cameroon; Congo; Mali; Sudan; Swaziland; Tunisia; Uganda; Zambia; Zimbabwe	9
Third round	Algeria; Egypt; Gabon; Ivory Coast; Morocco; Nigeria; South Africa	7
Qualifying rounds	Total	26
Final tournament	Senegal (hosts)	1

Did not enter
- Angola
- Benin
- Burkina Faso
- Burundi
- Cape Verde
- Central African Republic
- Chad
- Comoros
- Djibouti
- DR Congo (original hosts)
- Equatorial Guinea
- Eritrea
- Ethiopia
- Gambia
- Guinea
- Lesotho
- Madagascar
- Malawi
- Mauritius
- Mozambique
- Namibia
- Niger
- São Tomé and Príncipe
- Seychelles
- South Sudan
- Tanzania
- Togo

Notes

- The final tournament was originally to be hosted by the Democratic Republic of the Congo. After Senegal replaced them as hosts, the CAF released an updated version of the draw. In the initial draw, Zimbabwe and Swaziland were to play each other in the first round, where the winner would play South Africa in the second round, where the winner would play Senegal in the third round. In the updated draw, Zimbabwe and Swaziland play each other in the second round, where the winner play South Africa in the third round.
- Namibia's U23 team manager Jakes Amaning said the Namibia Football Association did apply to take part in the tournament, but due to unforeseen circumstances its name did not appear in the CAF draw. The Confederation of African Football have said the Namibian application may not have been received due to a "technical error". Although the draw took place on 20 September 2014, FIFA have set a deadline of 25 October for applicants.

== Format ==
Qualification ties were played on a home-and-away two-legged basis. If the aggregate score was tied after the second leg, the away goals rule would be applied, and if still level, the penalty shoot-out would be used to determine the winner (no extra time would be played).

The seven winners of the third round qualified for the final tournament.

== Schedule ==
The schedule of the qualifying rounds was as follows.

Round	Leg	Date
First round	First leg	24–26 April 2015
First round	Second leg	8–10 May 2015
Second round	First leg	22–24 May 2015
Second round	Second leg	29–31 May 2015
Third round	First leg	17–19 July 2015
Third round	Second leg	31 July–2 August 2015

== First round ==
Team 1	Agg.	Team 2	1st leg	2nd leg
Ghana	7–1	Liberia	2–0	5–1
Guinea-Bissau	w/o	Sierra Leone	—	—
Libya	w/o	Mauritania	—	—
Botswana	4–4 (a)	Kenya	3–0	1–4
Rwanda	3–1	Somalia	2–0	1–1

Note: Guinea-Bissau and Libya withdrew. Liberia played their home match in Ghana due to Ebola outbreak. Somalia played their home match in Djibouti (originally in Kenya) due to security concerns.

26 April 2015
15:30 UTC±0

Ghana	2–0	Liberia
Mohammed 28'; Ashia 65'	Report

Tamale Stadium, Tamale
Referee: Benjamin Ekabatiem Ekabatiem Odey (Nigeria)
2 May 2015
15:30 UTC±0

Liberia	1–5	Ghana
Harmon 34'	Report	Gadze 20'; Mensah 25'; Mohammed 39', 60'; Montari 77'

Tamale Stadium, Tamale
Referee: Antonio Manuel Fortes Rodrigues (Cape Verde)

Ghana won 7–1 on aggregate.

24 April 2015

Guinea-Bissau	Cancelled	Sierra Leone
	Report

Referee: Sekou Ahmed Toure (Guinea)
8 May 2015

Sierra Leone	Cancelled	Guinea-Bissau
	Report

Referee: Jerry S. Yekeh (Liberia)

Sierra Leone won on walkover.

24 April 2015

Libya	Cancelled	Mauritania
	Report

8 May 2015

Mauritania	Cancelled	Libya
	Report

Mauritania won on walkover.

24 April 2015
19:00 UTC+2

Botswana	3–0	Kenya
Kebatho 66', 86'; Makgantai 67'	Report

Lobatse Stadium, Lobatse
Referee: Norman Matemera (Zimbabwe)
9 May 2015
16:00 UTC+3

Kenya	4–1	Botswana
Olunga 19', 36', 90'; Ndirangu 78'	Report	Kebatho 22'

Nyayo National Stadium, Nairobi
Referee: Abdoul Karim Twagiramukiza (Rwanda)

4–4 on aggregate. Botswana won on away goals.

25 April 2015
15:30 UTC+2

Rwanda	2–0	Somalia
Mukunzi 17'; Muhire 90+2'	Report

Amahoro Stadium, Kigali
Attendance: 3,000
Referee: Waziri Sheha Waziri (Tanzania)
10 May 2015
16:00 UTC+3

Somalia	1–1	Rwanda
Mohammed 90'	Report	Songa 4'

Stade du Ville, Djibouti
Referee: Gait Metodious Oting (South Sudan)

Rwanda won 3–1 on aggregate.

== Second round ==
Team 1	Agg.	Team 2	1st leg	2nd leg
Ghana	1–1 (4–5 p)	Congo	1–0	0–1
Sierra Leone	1–1 (a)	Cameroon	0–0	1–1
Mauritania	2–4	Mali	1–1	1–3
Botswana	1–3	Zambia	1–1	0–2
Rwanda	1–4	Uganda	1–2	0–2
Zimbabwe	2–2 (a)	Swaziland	0–0	2–2
Tunisia	3–0	Sudan	1–0	2–0

Note: Sierra Leone played their home match in Cameroon due to Ebola outbreak.

23 May 2015
15:00 UTC±0

Ghana	1–0	Congo
Andoh 44'	Report

Accra Sports Stadium, Accra
Referee: Abou Coulibaly (Ivory Coast)
31 May 2015
15:30 UTC+1

Congo	1–0	Ghana
Ganvoula 26'	Report
Penalties
	5–4

Stade Municipal, Pointe-Noire
Referee: Henry Duvalier Mouandjo Kalla (Cameroon)

1–1 on aggregate. Congo won on penalties.

24 May 2015
16:00 UTC+1

Sierra Leone	0–0	Cameroon
	Report

Stade Ahmadou Ahidjo, Yaoundé
Referee: Omar Sallah (Gambia)
30 May 2015
15:00 UTC+1

Cameroon	1–1	Sierra Leone
Minala 33'	Report	Barrie 90' (pen.)

Stade Ahmadou Ahidjo, Yaoundé
Referee: Idriss Biani (Chad)

1–1 on aggregate. Sierra Leone won on away goals.

23 May 2015
17:00 UTC±0

Mauritania	1–1	Mali
Niass 63'	Report	Niane 88' (pen.)

Stade Olympique, Nouakchott
Referee: Adil Zourak (Morocco)
30 May 2015
17:00 UTC±0

Mali	3–1	Mauritania
Niane 3', 88' (pen.); Cissé 69'	Report	Bagili 53'

Stade Modibo Kéïta, Bamako
Referee: Baba Leno (Guinea)

Mali won 4–2 on aggregate.

22 May 2015
19:30 UTC+2

Botswana	1–1	Zambia
Mbaiwa 67'	Report	Chirwa 13'

Lobatse Stadium, Lobatse
Referee: Patrick Ngoleka (Malawi)
31 May 2015
15:00 UTC+2

Zambia	2–0	Botswana
Kampamba 47'; Kampamba 55'	Report

Nkoloma Stadium, Lusaka
Referee: Jose Maria Rachide (Mozambique)

Zambia won 3–1 on aggregate.

23 May 2015
15:30 UTC+2

Rwanda	1–2	Uganda
Nshuti 61'	Report	Miya 10'; Mutyaba 70'

Amahoro Stadium, Kigali
Referee: Souleiman Ahmed Djamal (Djibouti)
30 May 2015
16:00 UTC+3

Uganda	2–0	Rwanda
Ssemazi 61'; Miya 64'	Report

Nakivubo Stadium, Kampala
Referee: Sabri Mohamed Fadul (Sudan)

Uganda won 4–1 on aggregate.

24 May 2015
15:00 UTC+2

Zimbabwe	0–0	Swaziland
	Report

Rufaro Stadium, Harare
Referee: Ganesh Chutooree (Mauritius)
31 May 2015
15:00 UTC+2

Swaziland	2–2	Zimbabwe
Mkhontfo 40' (pen.); Dlamini 60'	Report	Kadewere 56'; Pfumbidzai 80' (pen.)

Somhlolo National Stadium, Lobamba
Referee: Andofetra Avombitana Rakotojaona (Madagascar)

2–2 on aggregate. Zimbabwe won on away goals.

23 May 2015
18:00 UTC+1

Tunisia	1–0	Sudan
Kchok 89'	Report

Stade Olympique de Radès, Radès
Referee: Pacifique Ndabihawenimana (Burundi)
31 May 2015
16:45 UTC+3

Sudan	0–2	Tunisia
	Report	Chaalali 23'; Meriah 66'

El Obeid Stadium, Al-Ubayyid
Referee: Mohamed El Hanafy (Egypt)

Tunisia won 3–0 on aggregate.

== Third round ==
Winners qualified for 2015 Africa U-23 Cup of Nations.

Team 1	Agg.	Team 2	1st leg	2nd leg
Nigeria	2–1	Congo	2–1	0–0
Algeria	2–0	Sierra Leone	2–0	0–0
Gabon	0–3	Mali	0–1	0–2
Ivory Coast	0–0 (3–4 p)	Zambia	0–0	0–0
Egypt	6–1	Uganda	4–0	2–1
Zimbabwe	1–4	South Africa	1–1	0–3
Morocco	1–2	Tunisia	1–0	0–2

Note: Sierra Leone played their home match in Algeria due to Ebola outbreak (match also brought forward by a week).

19 July 2015
16:00 UTC+1

Nigeria	2–1	Congo
Ajayi 48', 54'	Report	Nkounkou 66'

Adokiye Amiesimaka Stadium, Port Harcourt
Referee: Anthony Ogwayo (Kenya)
2 August 2015
15:30 UTC+1

Congo	0–0	Nigeria
	Report

Stade Municipal, Pointe-Noire
Referee: Mohamed Maarouf (Egypt)

Nigeria won 2–1 on aggregate.

19 July 2015
20:45 UTC+1

Algeria	2–0	Sierra Leone
Amokrane 8', 21'	Report

Stade Mustapha Tchaker, Blida
Referee: Wahid Tamuni Salah (Libya)
25 July 2015
20:45 UTC+1

Sierra Leone	0–0	Algeria
	Report

Stade Mustapha Tchaker, Blida
Referee: Daouda Gueye (Senegal)

Algeria won 2–0 on aggregate.

18 July 2015
15:30 UTC+1

Gabon	0–1	Mali
	Report	Niane 77'

Stade Augustin Monédan de Sibang, Libreville
Referee: Jean-Jacques Ndala (DR Congo)
2 August 2015
17:00 UTC±0

Mali	2–0	Gabon
Mboudou 68' (o.g.); Traoré 89'	Report

Stade Modibo Kéïta, Bamako
Referee: Mustapha Ghorbal (Algeria)

Mali won 3–0 on aggregate.

18 July 2015
15:00 UTC±0

Ivory Coast	0–0	Zambia
	Report

Stade Robert Champroux, Abidjan
Referee: Boukari Ouedraogo (Burkina Faso)
1 August 2015
15:00 UTC+2

Zambia	0–0	Ivory Coast
	Report
Penalties
Chirwa (penalty scored); Kampamba (penalty missed); Chepeshi (penalty scored); B. Sakala (penalty missed); Zulu (penalty missed); S. Sakala (penalty scored); Daka (penalty scored)	4–3	(penalty missed) Kessié; (penalty scored) Assalé; (penalty missed) Diarra; (penalty missed) Coulibaly; (penalty scored) Maiga; (penalty scored) Ahoulou; (penalty missed) N'Guessan

Nkoloma Stadium, Lusaka
Referee: Tirelo Mositwane (Botswana)

0–0 on aggregate. Zambia won on penalties.

18 July 2015
19:15 UTC+2

Egypt	4–0	Uganda
Salem 7'; Kahraba 68', 90+2'; Sobhi 79'	Report

Borg El Arab Stadium, Alexandria
Attendance: 1,000
Referee: Hassan Mohamed Hagi (Somalia)
1 August 2015
16:00 UTC+3

Uganda	1–2	Egypt
Miya 77'	Report	Kahraba 18', 56'

Mandela National Stadium, Kampala
Referee: Jean Marc Ganamandji (Central African Republic)

Egypt won 6–1 on aggregate.

19 July 2015
15:00 UTC+2

Zimbabwe	1–1	South Africa
Musona 84' (pen.)	Report	Dolly 66'

Rufaro Stadium, Harare
Referee: Stanley Hachiwa (Zambia)
1 August 2015
20:15 UTC+2

South Africa	3–0	Zimbabwe
Dolly 2', 90'; Motupa 9'	Report

Harry Gwala Stadium, Pietermaritzburg
Referee: Simanga Pritchard Nhleko (Swaziland)

South Africa won 4–1 on aggregate.

19 July 2015
18:00 UTC+1

Morocco	1–0	Tunisia
Bencharki 45' (pen.)	Report

Stade de FUS, Rabat
Referee: Fidel Gomes (Guinea-Bissau)
2 August 2015
18:00 UTC+1

Tunisia	2–0	Morocco
Rjaïbi 57'; Jouini 63'	Report

Stade Olympique de Radès, Radès
Referee: Mohamed Hamada (Mauritania)

Tunisia won 2–1 on aggregate.

== Qualified teams ==
The following eight teams qualified for the final tournament.

Team	Qualified on	Previous appearances in tournament^{1}
Senegal (hosts)	14 March 2015	1 (2011)
Nigeria	2 August 2015	1 (2011)
Algeria	25 July 2015	1 (2011)
Mali	2 August 2015	0 (debut)
Zambia	1 August 2015	0 (debut)
Egypt	1 August 2015	1 (2011)
South Africa	1 August 2015	1 (2011)
Tunisia	1 August 2015	0 (debut)

^{1} Bold indicates champion for that year. Italic indicates host for that year.

== Goalscorers ==
4 goals

- (Egypt) Kahraba
- (Mali) Adama Niane

3 goals

- (Botswana) Omaatla Kebatho
- (Ghana) Dauda Mohammed
- (Kenya) Michael Olunga
- (South Africa) Keagan Dolly
- (Uganda) Farouk Miya

2 goals

- (Algeria) Abdelhakim Amokrane
- (Nigeria) Junior Ajayi

1 goal

- (Botswana) Onkabetse Makgantai
- (Botswana) Unobatsha Mbaiwa
- (Cameroon) Joseph Minala
- (Republic of the Congo) Silvère Ganvoula
- (Republic of the Congo) Moise Nkounkou
- (Egypt) Mohamed Salem
- (Egypt) Ramadan Sobhi
- (Ghana) Kennedy Ashia
- (Ghana) Ebo Andoh
- (Ghana) Richard Gadze
- (Ghana) Baba Mensah
- (Ghana) Tamimu Montari
- (Kenya) John Ndirangu
- (Liberia) Van-Dave Harmon
- (Mali) Moctar Cissé
- (Mali) Adama Traoré
- (Mauritania) Boubacar Bagili
- (Mauritania) Mamadou Niass
- (Morocco) Achraf Bencharki
- (Rwanda) Isaïe Songa
- (Rwanda) Yannick Mukunzi
- (Rwanda) Kevin Muhire
- (Rwanda) Dominique Savio Nshuti
- (Sierra Leone) Ibrahim Sorie Barrie
- (Somalia) Abbas Mohammed
- (South Africa) Gift Motupa
- (Eswatini) Muzi Dlamini
- (Eswatini) Mxolisi Mkhontfo
- (Tunisia) Ghailene Chaalali
- (Tunisia) Haythem Jouini
- (Tunisia) Slimane Kchok
- (Tunisia) Yassine Meriah
- (Tunisia) Edem Rjaïbi
- (Uganda) Muzamir Mutyaba
- (Uganda) John Ssemazi
- (Zambia) Jackson Chirwa
- (Zambia) Kelvin Kampamba
- (Zambia) Ronald Kampamba
- (Zimbabwe) Tino Kadewere
- (Zimbabwe) Walter Musona
- (Zimbabwe) Ronald Pfumbidzai

Own goal

- (Gabon) Karl Mboudou (playing against Mali)
