= Joseph Minala =

Cameroonian footballer

Joseph Marie Minala
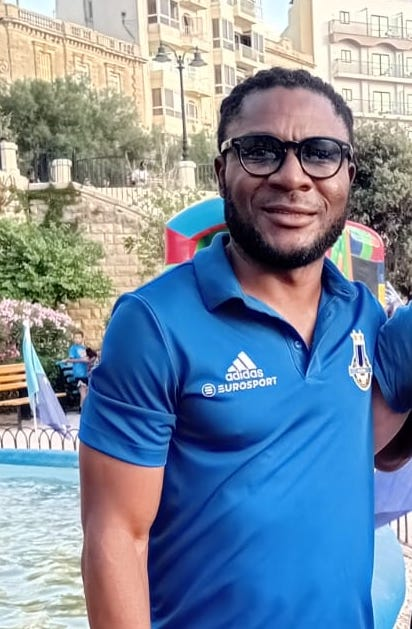
- Minala with Sliema Wanderers in 2024

Personal information
- Full name: Joseph Marie Minala
- Date of birth: 24 August 1996 (age 30)
- Place of birth: Yaoundé, Cameroon
- Height: 1.84 m (6 ft 0 in)
- Position: Midfielder

Team information
- Current team: Marsaxlokk
- Number: 25

Youth career
- 2012–2013: Vigor Perconti
- 2013–2014: Lazio

Senior career*
Years	Team	Apps	(Gls)
2014–2021	Lazio	3	(0)
2014–2015	→ Bari (loan)	18	(3)
2015–2016	→ Latina (loan)	3	(1)
2016	→ Bari (loan)	1	(0)
2017–2018	→ Salernitana (loan)	52	(4)
2019	→ Salernitana (loan)	12	(2)
2020	→ Qingdao Huanghai (loan)	9	(0)
2021–2022	Lucchese	19	(3)
2023	Liepāja	2	(0)
2023–2024	Sliema Wanderers	19	(1)
2024–2025	Gżira United	18	(1)
2025–	Marsaxlokk	29	(3)

International career^{‡}
2015	Cameroon U23	2	(1)
- * Club domestic league appearances and goals as of 7 May 2026 ‡ National team caps and goals as of 9 May 2017

Joseph Marie Minala (born 24 August 1996) is a Cameroonian professional footballer who plays as a midfielder for Maltese Premier League club Marsaxlokk.

== Club career ==
=== Early career ===
Minala began playing for amateur club Vigor Perconti and attracted the attention of Napoli, who gave him a two-month trial. He was spotted by Lazio scouts in 2013, while representing the region of Lazio in the Trofeo delle Regioni. He joined Lazio in the summer of 2013.

In early 2014, Minala then made news when his age was publicly disputed by multiple parties. Both Lazio and the player denied the claims. In May 2014, the Italian FA completed their investigation into the claims, confirming the accuracy of his given age and announcing that no disciplinary action would be taken against him or Lazio.

=== Lazio ===
Minala broke into Lazio's senior team on 16 March 2014, when he was an unused substitute in the match against Cagliari. He then made his full Serie A debut on 6 April, replacing Senad Lulić for the last 13 minutes of a 2–0 home win against Sampdoria.

On 25 August 2014 Minala was loaned to Serie B side Bari for the 2014–15 season. On 13 December, as a 73rd-minute substitute for Marco Augusto Romizi, he scored his first career goal, the last-minute decider in an away victory over Cittadella. He scored two more goals, and was also sent off twice.

Minala was again loaned to a Serie B team, Latina, on 6 July 2015. He made his debut on 9 August, starting in a 4–1 home defeat to Lega Pro team Pavia in the first round of the Coppa Italia. He scored his first goal for the team on 27 October, equalising in a 2–1 loss to Ternana at the Stadio Domenico Francioni. In January 2016, he rejoined Bari.

On 21 January 2017, Minala joined Serie B side Salernitana on loan with an option to buy. Two years later, he returned to the same club on loan for the rest of the season.

Minala signed with Chinese Super League club Qingdao Huanghai on loan on 28 February 2020, until the end of the year.

=== Lucchese ===
On 26 October 2021, Minala signed for Serie C team Lucchese until the end of the season.

=== Olbia ===
On 23 August 2022, Minala joined Olbia on a one-year contract. On 6 January 2023, Minala's contract with Olbia was terminated by mutual consent.

=== Liepāja ===
On 3 March 2023, Minala signed for Latvian Higher League club FK Liepāja.

=== Sliema Wanderers ===
In the summer of 2023, Minala joined Maltese Premier League side Sliema Wanderers.

== International career ==
Minala played for Cameroon at under-23 level in their unsuccessful qualification campaign for the 2015 Africa U-23 Cup of Nations. He scored against Sierra Leone in a 1–1 draw on 30 May 2015, but Cameroon were eliminated in the second round on away goals.

== Career statistics ==
As of match played 18 April 2023

Appearances and goals by club, season and competition
Club	Season	League			National cup (Note: Includes Coppa Italia and Chinese FA Cup)		Continental		Other		Total	
Club	Season	Division	Apps	Goals	Apps	Goals	Apps	Goals	Apps	Goals	Apps	Goals
Lazio	2013–14	Serie A	3	0	0	0	0	0	0	0	3	0
Lazio	2019–20	Serie A	0	0	1	0	0	0	0	0	1	0
Lazio	Total		3	0	1	0	0	0	0	0	4	0
Bari (loan)	2014–15	Serie B	18	3	0	0	—		—		18	3
Latina (loan)	2015–16	Serie B	3	1	1	0	—		—		4	1
Bari (loan)	2015–16	Serie B	1	0	0	0	—		—		1	0
Salernitana (loan)	2016–17	Serie B	16	1	0	0	—		—		16	1
Salernitana (loan)	2017–18	Serie B	36	3	1	1	—		—		37	4
Salernitana (loan)	2018–19	Serie B	12	2	0	0	—		2 (Note: Appearances in Serie B relegation play-out)	0	14	2
Salernitana (loan)	Total		64	6	1	1	0	0	2	0	67	7
Qingdao Huanghai (loan)	2020	Chinese Super League	15	0	1	0	—		—		16	0
Lucchese	2021–22	Serie C	19	3	0	0	—		1 (Note: Appearance in Serie C promotion play-offs)	0	20	3
Olbia	2022–23	Serie C	12	0	0	0	—		—		12	0
Liepāja	2023	Latvian Higher League	2	0	0	0	0	0	—		2	0
Sliema Wanderers	2023–24	Maltese Premier League	0	0	0	0	—		—		0	0
Career total			137	13	4	1	0	0	3	0	144	14
