= Didi Kitumbo Mpiana =

Congolese footballer

Personal information
- Full name: Didi Kitumbo Mpiana
- Date of birth: 4 June 1985 (age 41)
- Place of birth: Lubumbashi, Zaïre
- Position: Defender

Senior career*
Years	Team	Apps	(Gls)
2011–2016	FC Saint-Éloi Lupopo		
2016–2018	Zanaco F.C.		

International career
2012	DR Congo	1	(0)
- * Club domestic league appearances and goals

Didi Kitumbo Mpiana, also written Diddy (born 4 June 1985) is a retired Congolese footballer who played as a defender.

With Saint-Éloi Lupopo, he played and scored in the 2012 CAF Confederation Cup qualifying rounds, and won the Congolese cup in 2015. He was also team captain of Saint-Éloi Lupopo.

He got his sole cap for DR Congo against Oman in 2012.

For Zanaco, he among others scored a winning goal against Cotonsport Garoua in the 2017 CAF Champions League group stage. He helped win the 2016 Zambia Super League and the 2017 cup.
