= Azeez Shobowale Shobola =

Nigerian footballer (born 1992)

Personal information
- Full name: Azeez Shobowale Shobola
- Date of birth: 31 January 1992 (age 34)
- Place of birth: Nigeria
- Height: 1.70 m (5 ft 7 in)
- Position: Winger

Team information
- Current team: Al-Nahda

Youth career
- 2009–2011: ABS FC

Senior career*
Years	Team	Apps	(Gls)
2012	Dolphins FC		
2013–2016	Kano Pillars		
2016–2018	Al-Hilal Club		
2018–2019	Al-Ain		
2019–	Al-Nahda		
- * Club domestic league appearances and goals

Azeez Shobowale Shobola (born 31 January 1992) is a Nigerian footballer who currently plays for Al-Nahda Club (Oman).

== Football & Club career ==
Azeez began his professional career with Abubakar Bukola Saraki's ABS FC (formerly Bukola Babes) where he spent two seasons from 2009 to 2011. His performance at the club secured him a contract with Dolphins F.C. (Port Harcourt) for the 2012 season, when he joined Shooting Stars S.C. (3SC) in Ibadan. Azeez also played for 3SC between 2012 and 2013 before leaving for the northern club Kano Pillars F.C. which won the Nigeria Professional Football League in his first season.

After three successful seasons with Pillars, he attracted interest from international clubs, and in 2016 moved to Al-Hilal Club (Omdurman) in Sudan.

Azeez was called up for the "Super Eagles", the Nigeria national football team, in 2016 for that year's African Nations Championship.

== Achievements ==
With: Al-Hilal

- Sudan Premier League

Champion (2): 2016, 2017

- Sudan Cup

Winner (1): 2016

With: Kano Pillars F.C.

- Nigeria Premier League

Champion (1): 2014
