= Mighty Blue Angels FC =

Liberian football club

Mighty Blue Angels
- Full name: Mighty Blue Angels Football Club
- Ground: UNT Stadium; Unification Town, Margibi County, Liberia
- Capacity: 7,000
- Chairman: (Liberia) Thomas M. Nyan
- League: LFA Second Division
- 2021–22: LFA Second Division, 7th of 14

Mighty Blue Angels Football Club is a club based in Monrovia, Liberia. They won the second division championship in their first season after promotion.

== Achievements ==
- Liberian Premier League: 0
- Liberian Cup: 1

2002

== Performance in CAF competitions ==
- CAF Cup Winners' Cup: 1 appearance

2003 – disqualified in First Round

== Current squad ==
Note: Flags indicate national team as defined under FIFA eligibility rules; some limited exceptions apply. Players may hold more than one non-FIFA nationality.

No.	Pos.	Nation	Player
—		(Liberia) LBR	Bill Sheriff
