= Kemo =

Kemo may refer to:

- Kémo, a prefecture in the Central African Republic named for the Kémo river
- Possel, a settlement in the Central African Republic once known as Kémo
- KEMO-TV, a television station in Santa Rosa, California, United States
- KOFY-TV, a television station in San Francisco, California, United States, originally KEMO-TV
- DJ Kemo, a member of Canadian hip-hop group Rascalz
- Kemo Sabe, nickname used for fictional character The Lone Ranger
