= Gregory Sambou =

Gambian footballer

Personal information
- Date of birth: 25 October 1994 (age 32)
- Place of birth: Banjul, Gambia
- Height: 1.76 m (5 ft 9 1/2 in)
- Position: Defender

Team information
- Current team: Real de Banjul

Senior career*
Years	Team	Apps	(Gls)
2013–2015	Young Africans		
2015–2018	Gambia Ports Authority		
2018–	Real de Banjul		

International career^{‡}
2016–	Gambia	6	(0)
- * Club domestic league appearances and goals as of 19:09, 28 February 2020 (UTC) ‡ National team caps and goals as of 19:09, 28 February 2020 (UTC)

Gregory Sambou (born 25 October 1994) is a Gambian international footballer who plays for Real de Banjul, as a defender.

== Career ==
Born in Banjul, he has played club football for Young Africans, Gambia Ports Authority and Real de Banjul.

He made his international debut for Gambia in 2016.
