= 2015 South Sudan Football Championship =

South Sudan Football Championship
- Season: 2015
- Champions: Atlabara FC

The 2015 South Sudan Football Championship was the 3rd season of the South Sudan Football Championship, the top-level football championship of South Sudan.

== Teams ==
A total of 12 teams played in the championship.
