= Francisco Ondo =

Cameroonian footballer

Personal information
- Full name: Franklin Bama Yangoua, or Francisco Obama Ondo
- Date of birth: 9 September 1996, 15 May 1996 or 10 November 1996
- Place of birth: Yaoundé, Cameroon
- Position: Defender

Team information
- Current team: AS Vita Club

Senior career*
Years	Team	Apps	(Gls)
2013–2014	Akonangui FC		
2015	Leones Vegetarianos FC		
2015–2016	FC Cape Town	11	(0)
2016–	AS Vita Club		

International career
2014	Equatorial Guinea	3	(0)
- * Club domestic league appearances and goals

Franklin Bama Yangoua or Francisco Obama Ondo (born 9 September 1996, 15 May 1996 or 10 November 1996) is a naturalized Equatoguinean professional footballer originally from Cameroon. He is playing for AS Vita Club in DR Congo.

After winning the Equatoguinean Primera División in 2013, he competed for Akonangui FC at the 2014 CAF Champions League in February 2014. On 4 May 2014, he was called up to the Equatorial Guinea national team for two 2015 Africa Cup of Nations qualifying matches against Mauritania. So far, he was known as Franklin Bama Yangoua, his date of birth being 9 September 1996. However, when the first leg took place in Nouakchott two weeks later, he was an unused substitute under the name Francisco Obama Ondo and the date of birth 15 May 1996. In February 2015, he competed for Leones Vegetarianos FC at the 2015 CAF Confederation Cup, again under the name Francisco Obama Ondo, but with another date of birth: 10 November 1996.

His original name is Franklin Bama Yangoua, which he changed to Francisco Obama Ondo after moving to Equatorial Guinea in 2013 to play for Akonangui FC. After living there for one year, he was called up to the Equatorial Guinea national football team even though he had no ancestry from there nor had the means to have citizenship. The Confederation of African Football rules indicated that a player is required to be naturalized for at least five years before granted national team permission. He clandestinely managed to elude this until 2017.

== Transfers ==
Arranged to be sold in May 2016, he was part of the 'mass exodus' of FC Cape Town in which they sold almost half their team.
