= 2015 Réunion Premier League =

Réunion Premier League
- Season: 2015
- Champions: JS Saint-Pierroise

The 2015 Réunion Premier League was the 66th season of the Réunion Premier League, the professional league for association football clubs in Réunion, since the league's establishment in 1950. The season started on 28 March and concluded on 29 November 2015.

== Standings ==
Pos	Team	Pld	W	D	L	GF	GA	GD	Pts	
1	JS Saint-Pierroise (C)	22	15	4	3	45	16	+29	71	Champions
2	SS Saint-Louisienne	22	12	7	3	28	12	+16	65	
3	US Sainte-Marienne	22	12	5	5	41	20	+21	63	
4	AS Excelsior	22	11	8	3	35	19	+16	63	
5	Saint-Pauloise FC	22	11	2	9	26	22	+4	57	
6	AS Marsouins (Saint-Leu)	22	11	2	9	24	25	−1	57	
7	SS Jeanne d'Arc (Le Port)	22	8	4	10	27	29	−2	50	
8	SDEFA (Saint-Denis)	22	6	7	9	14	23	−9	47	
9	AJ Petite-Ile	22	5	5	12	19	34	−15	42	
10	SS Capricorne (Saint-Pierre)	22	5	4	13	21	40	−19	41	
11	ARC Bras Fusil (R)	22	4	4	14	13	32	−19	38	Relegated to Super Division 2
12	US Bénédictins (R)	22	3	6	13	14	35	−21	37	Relegated to Super Division 2

(C) Champions; (R) Relegated
