= Oumar Sidibé (footballer, born 1990) =

Malian footballer

Personal information
- Date of birth: 25 March 1990 (age 36)
- Place of birth: Bamako, Mali
- Height: 1.65 m (5 ft 5 in)
- Position: Attacking midfielder

Team information
- Current team: Rayon Sports

Senior career*
Years	Team	Apps	(Gls)
2007–2010	Real Bamako		
2010–2013	Stade Malien		
2013–2016	Al-Hilal Club		
2016–2018	AS Vita Club		
2018–2019	Hatayspor		
2019–	Rayon Sports		

International career^{‡}
2009	Mali	1	(0)
- * Club domestic league appearances and goals as of 01:28, 21 November 2021 (UTC) ‡ National team caps and goals as of 01:28, 21 November 2021 (UTC)

Oumar Sidibé (born 25 March 1990) is a Malian professional footballer who plays as an attacking midfielder for the Rwandan club Rayon Sports.

== Club career ==
Sidibé began his career in Mali with Real Bamako and Stade Malien. He moved to Sudan with Al-Hilal Club in 2013. In 2016, he transferred to the DR Congo with AS Vita Club, and followed that with a stint in Turkey with Hatayspor. On 5 August 2019, he transferred to the Rwandan club Rayon Sports.

== International career ==
Sidibé appeared with the Mali national team in a friendly 3–0 win over Equatorial Guinea on 24 April 2009.
