= 2015–16 Equatoguinean Primera División =

Equatoguinean Primera División
- Season: 2015–16
- Champions: Sony Ela Nguema

The 2015–16 Equatoguinean Primera División season is the top level of competition in Equatorial Guinea. It began on 12 September 2015 and concluded on 19 July 2016.

== Liguilla Nacional ==
=== Final ===
Sony Ela Nguema 0-0 Vegetarianos [3-2 pen]
