= Kwame Attram =

Ghanaian footballer

Personal information
- Date of birth: 10 January 1989 (age 37)
- Place of birth: Kumasi, Ghana
- Height: 1.78 m (5 ft 10 in)
- Position: Forward

Team information
- Current team: Mufulira Wanderers

Senior career*
Years	Team	Apps	(Gls)
- Asante Kotoko
2009–2010	Wadi Degla		
2010–2012	TOT SC		
2012	Hà Nội	15	(8)
2013	Pigg's Peak Black Swallows		
20xx–2015	Milano United		
2015	Tshakhuma Tsha Madzivhandila	16	(13)
2016	Sportive Bazano		
2016–2017	Zanaco		
2017–2018	Dire Dawa City		
2019	Lusaka Dynamos		
2019–	Mufulira Wanderers		
- * Club domestic league appearances and goals

Kwame Attram (born 10 January 1989 in Ghana) is a Ghanaian professional football striker who plays for Mufulira Wanderers.

== Career ==
Back in 2013, Attram joined Swazi side Pigg's Peak Black Swallows following his stint in Vietnam.

Sealing a move from Congolese side Sportive Bazano to Zanaco F.C. in 2016, Attram settled well, satisfying his goal-to-game ratio with a brace against Napsa Stars while coming off the bench. Clinching the 2016 Zambian Premier League title with Zanaco, the midfielder targets a call-up to the Ghana national football team.

In March 2018, Attram joined Dire Dawa City. In the beginning of January 2019, he joined Zambian club Lusaka Dynamos.

== Personal life ==
As he plays in Zambia, the Ghanaian knows some basic Nyanja, one of the country's many autochthonous languages. Also, he is a Christian and goes to church on a regular basis.
