= Temitope Olusesi =

Nigerian professional footballer

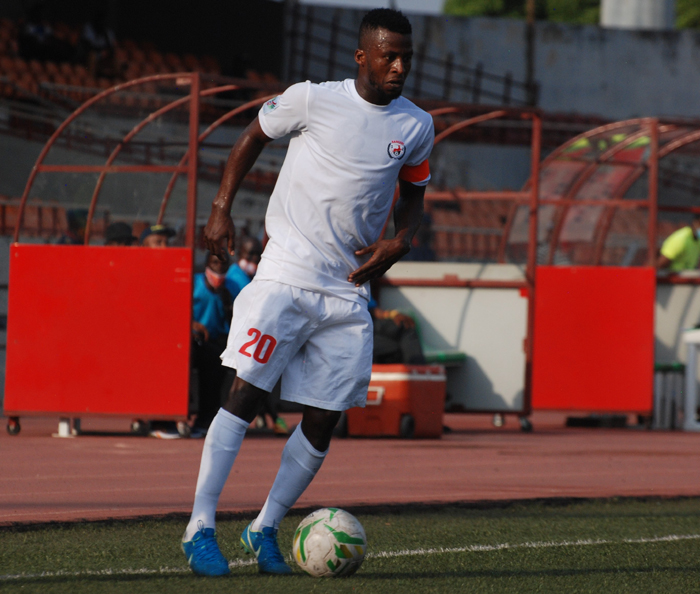

Personal information
- Full name: Olusesi Temitope Emmanuel
- Date of birth: 22 September 1996 (age 30)
- Place of birth: Sapele, Delta State, Nigeria
- Height: 1.77 m (5 ft 10 in)
- Position: Right-back

Team information
- Current team: Enugu Rangers
- Number: 20

Youth career
- 2012–2014: Heartland FC B

Senior career*
Years	Team	Apps	(Gls)
2014–2016	Heartland F.C.	20	(4)
2016–	Enugu Rangers	27	(8)
- * Club domestic league appearances and goals

Temitope Olusesi (born September 22, 1996 in Sapele, Delta State, Nigeria) is a Nigerian professional footballer, who plays as a right-back for Enugu Rangers in the Nigeria Professional Football League.

== Club career ==
Olusesi started his career from Heartland Team B, he gained promotion to the first team Heartland F.C. in 2014 where he signed his first professional contract. He sometimes play the role of an attacker.

Olusesi joined Enugu Rangers in the 2016–17 Nigeria Professional Football League season on a three-year contract.

He previously served as a vice captain of the club before his appointment as the general captain in 2020.

Olusesi has also played at the 2019–20 CAF Confederation Cup in 2019.

== Honours ==
Enugu Rangers

- Nigeria Professional Football League: 2016
- Nigerian FA Cup: 2018

Individual

- Nigeria Professional Football League (NPFL) VAT Wonder Goal Award: 2018
