= Ronald Pfumbidzai =

Zimbabwean association football player (born 1994)

Personal information
- Full name: Ronald Tapiwa Pfumbidzai
- Date of birth: 25 December 1994 (age 31)
- Place of birth: Harare, Zimbabwe
- Height: 1.80 m (5 ft 11 in)
- Position: Left-back

Team information
- Current team: Scottland

Senior career*
Years	Team	Apps	(Gls)
2012	Hippo Valley		
2013–2017	CAPS United		
2015	→ Hobro (loan)	0	(0)
2017–2021	Bloemfontein Celtic	61	(4)
2021–2022	Royal AM	0	(0)
2022–2023	Chippa United	29	(4)
2023–2024	SuperSport United	10	(04)
2024–	Scottland		

International career^{‡}
- Zimbabwe U20
- Zimbabwe U23
2014–2019	Zimbabwe	19	(2)
Medal record
Men's football
Representing Zimbabwe
COSAFA Cup
Third place	2019 South Africa
- * Club domestic league appearances and goals as of 30 September 2024 ‡ National team caps and goals as of 30 September 2024

Ronald Tapiwa Pfumbidzai (born 25 December 1994) is a Zimbabwean footballer who plays as a defender for SuperSport United and the Zimbabwe national football team.

He captained the national under-20 team in the 2013 COSAFA U-20 Cup and later played in 2015 Africa U-23 Cup of Nations qualifiers.

After several years in South Africa, Pfumbidzai signed for Scott Sakupwanya-owned Scottland F.C. in the summer of 2024.

== Honours ==
Zimbabwe

- COSAFA Cup: 3rd place, 2019
