= Kemoh Kamara =

Liberian footballer

Personal information
- Full name: Kemoh Sidiki Kamara
- Date of birth: 3 July 1995 (age 31)
- Place of birth: Lassaou, Guinea
- Position: Defender

Team information
- Current team: FC Bea

Senior career*
Years	Team	Apps	(Gls)
2016–2018	Barrack Young Controllers		
2018–2019	LISCR		
2019–	FC Bea		

International career^{‡}
2016–	Liberia	26	(0)
- * Club domestic league appearances and goals as of 11:43, 19 September 2018 (UTC) ‡ National team caps and goals as of 23:35, 8 September 2025 (UTC)

Kemoh Sidiki Kamara (born 3 July 1995) is a Liberian former footballer who played for Barrack Young Controllers as a defender.

== Career ==
Born in Lassaou, Guinea, Kamara has played for Barrack Young Controllers.

He made his international debut for Liberia in 2016.
