= Jubilee FC =

Liberian football club

Jubilee
- Full name: Jubilee Football Club
- Founded: 2008
- Ground: Antoinette Tubman Stadium; Monrovia, Liberia
- Capacity: 10,000
- League: LFA 2nd Division
- 2023–24: 9th

Jubilee is a football club based in Monrovia, Liberia. The team plays in Liberian Premier League.

== Stadium ==
Their home Stadium is the Antoinette Tubman Stadium in Monrovia.

== League participations ==
- Liberian Premier League: 2013–
- Liberian Second Division League: ????–2013
