= Ronald Chitiyo =

Zimbabwean footballer (born 1992)

Personal information
- Date of birth: 10 June 1992 (age 34)
- Place of birth: Harare, Zimbabwe
- Height: 1.65 m (5 ft 5 in)
- Position: Midfielder

Team information
- Current team: CAPS United

Senior career*
Years	Team	Apps	(Gls)
2010–2012	Douglas Warriors F.C.		
2012–2014	Monomotapa United		
2014–2015	Dynamos		
2015–2017	Harare City		
2017	CAPS United		
2017	CS Sfaxien	0	(0)
2018–	CAPS United		

International career^{‡}
2012–	Zimbabwe	14	(2)
- * Club domestic league appearances and goals ‡ National team caps and goals as of 15:15, 24 May 2018 (UTC)

Ronald Chitiyo (born 10 June 1992), commonly known as Rooney, is a Zimbabwean footballer who plays as a midfielder for Zimbabwe Premier Soccer League side CAPS United and the Zimbabwe national team.

== Club career ==
Chitiyo, son of former footballer Frank Chitiyo, began his senior career with Douglas Warriors F.C. Two years later, he left to join Monomotapa United, during his time with Monomotapa he finished as second runner-up in the 2012 Soccer Star of the Year award. In 2013, Chitiyo had trials at South African Premier Soccer League duo Ajax Cape Town and Orlando Pirates but failed to gain a contract. 12 months later he signed for Dynamos following Monomotapa's relegation from the top division. 2015 saw a failed move to South African side Royal Eagles which led Chitiyo to extend his stay with Dynamos.

Chitiyo would leave Dynamos around a year later, though, to sign for Harare City in 2015. In January 2017, Chitiyo joined reigning Zimbabwe Premier Soccer League champions CAPS United on a two-year deal. On 18 August, Chitiyo was on the move again as he left Zimbabwean football for the first time to join Tunisian Ligue Professionnelle 1 side CS Sfaxien on a four-year contract. He left Sfaxien to rejoin CAPS United in January 2018 following no appearances and contract disputes.

== International career ==
Chitiyo has won Fourteen caps for the Zimbabwe national team and has managed two goals for his nation. His two goals for Zimbabwe have come against Lesotho and Mauritius.

== Career statistics ==
=== Club ===
As of 8 March 2018

Appearances and goals by club, season and competition
Club	Season	League			National cup (Note: Includes the Tunisian Cup.)		League cup		Continental		Other		Total	
Club	Season	Division	Apps	Goals	Apps	Goals	Apps	Goals	Apps	Goals	Apps	Goals	Apps	Goals
CS Sfaxien	2017–18	Ligue 1	0	0	0	0	—		—		0	0	0	0
Career total			0	0	0	0	—		—		0	0	0	0

=== International ===
As of 8 March 2018.

National team	Year	Apps	Goals
Zimbabwe
Zimbabwe	2012	3	1
Zimbabwe	2013	2	0
Zimbabwe	2014	1	0
Zimbabwe	2015	3	1
Zimbabwe	2016	5	0
Total		14	2

As of 8 March 2018. Scores and results list Zimbabwe's goal tally first.

Goal	Date	Venue	Opponent	Score	Result	Competition
1	17 July 2012	Molepolole Stadium, Molepolole, Botswana	Lesotho	1–1	5–3	Three Nations Tournament
2	17 May 2015	Moruleng Stadium, Rustenburg, South Africa	Mauritius	2–0	2–0	2015 COSAFA Cup

== Honours ==
Dynamos

- Zimbabwe Premier Soccer League: 2014
