= Keitrace FC =

Liberian football club

- Full name: Keitrace Football Club
- Ground: Blue Field Sports Ground; Monrovia, Liberia
- Capacity: 1,000
- League: Liberian Premier League
- 2013–14: 8th

Keitrace FC is a football club based in Monrovia Liberia.

The team plays in Liberian Premier League.

== Stadium ==
Their home Stadium is the Blue Field Sports Ground in Monrovia.

== League participations ==
- Liberian Premier League: 2013–
- Liberian Second Division League: ????–2013
