= Brian Amidu =

Zimbabwean footballer (born 1990)

Personal information
- Full name: Brian Abbas Amidu
- Date of birth: 21 May 1990 (age 36)
- Place of birth: Glen Norah, Harare, Zimbabwe
- Height: 1.80 m (5 ft 11 in)
- Position: Forward

Senior career*
Years	Team	Apps	(Gls)
2011–2012	Black Mambas F.C.		
2012	Kaizer Chiefs F.C.	0	(0)
2012–2015	Black Leopards F.C.	36	(7)
2015–2016	Masafi Al-Wasat		
2016–2017	CAPS United F.C.		
2017–2018	El Entag El Harby SC	8	(1)
2018–2019	Arar		

International career^{‡}
2013–	Zimbabwe	7	(1)
- * Club domestic league appearances and goals as of 17 March 2019 ‡ National team caps and goals as of 17 March 2019

Brian Abbas Amidu (born 21 May 1990) is a Zimbabwean footballer who played as a forward for the Zimbabwe national football team.

== Career ==
=== Kaizer Chiefs ===
After a two-week trial at the club in early 2012, Amidu joined South African club Kaizer Chiefs. After struggling with injuries, Amidu left the club in August of that year, failing to make an official appearance.

=== International ===
Amidu made his senior international debut on 6 February 2013 in a 2-1 friendly victory over Botswana.

== Arrest ==
In October 2025 Amidu was arrested for drug trafficking after he was found with dagga with an estimated street value of US$75,000 (approximately R1.4 million) by the Zimbabwean Police. In February 2026, Amidu and Kudzai Mhlanga were each sentenced to 12 years in prison by the Zimbabwean court.

=== International Goals ===
Scores and results list Zimbabwe's goal tally first.

Goal	Date	Venue	Opponent	Score	Result	Competition
1.	24 March 2018	Levy Mwanawasa Stadium, Ndola, Zambia	Angola	1–0	2–2 (2–4 p)	Friendly
