= 2015–16 GFA League First Division =

GFA League First Division
- Season: 2015–16

The 2015–16 GFA League First Division is the 47th season of top-tier football in Gambia. The season began on 28 November 2015 and ended on 29 May 2016.

The league comprises 12 teams. Gambia Ports Authority were the champions, so they earned a spot in the 2017 CAF Champions League. Wallidan and Banjul United were relegated to the GFA League Second Division.

== League table ==
| Pos | Team | Pld | W | D | L | GF | GA | GD | Pts | Qualification or relegation |
|---|---|---|---|---|---|---|---|---|---|---|
| 1 | Gambia Ports Authority | 22 | 11 | 9 | 2 | 21 | 11 | +10 | 42 | 2017 CAF Champions League |
| 2 | Brikama United | 22 | 10 | 11 | 1 | 23 | 8 | +15 | 41 | |
| 3 | Real de Banjul | 22 | 11 | 8 | 3 | 24 | 12 | +12 | 41 | |
| 4 | Gamtel | 22 | 7 | 10 | 5 | 21 | 18 | +3 | 31 | |
| 5 | Banjul Hawks | 22 | 5 | 12 | 5 | 19 | 18 | +1 | 27 | |
| 6 | Steve Biko | 22 | 6 | 7 | 9 | 10 | 13 | −3 | 25 | |
| 7 | Bombada United | 22 | 5 | 9 | 8 | 25 | 29 | −4 | 24 | |
| 8 | Samger | 22 | 4 | 12 | 6 | 20 | 24 | −4 | 24 | |
| 9 | Armed Forces | 22 | 4 | 11 | 7 | 13 | 18 | −5 | 23 | |
| 10 | Serrekunda United | 22 | 3 | 11 | 8 | 13 | 19 | −6 | 20 | |
| 11 | Wallidan (R) | 22 | 4 | 8 | 10 | 13 | 26 | −13 | 20 | Relegation to 2016–17 GFA League Second Division |
| 12 | Banjul United (R) | 22 | 2 | 12 | 8 | 22 | 28 | −6 | 18 | Relegation to 2016–17 GFA League Second Division |

Updated to match(es) played on 29 May 2016. Source: Standings
Rules for classification: 1) points; 2) goal difference; 3) number of goals scored.
(R) Relegated
