= 2008 First Division (The Gambia) =

First Division
- Season: 2008
- Champions: Wallidan FC
- Runner up: Samger FC
- Promoted: Brikama United; Tallindang United
- Relegated: Gambia Ports Authority; Interior FC
- Matches: 132
- Goals: 186 (1.41 per match)

The 2008 First Division season was the 40th of the amateur competition of the first-tier football in the Gambia. The competition was governed by the Gambian Football Association (GFA) . The season began on February 24 and finished on July 13. The Real de Banjul won the tenth title after finishing with 39 points and qualified into the 2009 CAF Champions League the following season. Wallidan FC was also winner of the 2008 Gambian Cup, runner up was Samger, not even that club qualified and competed in the 2009 CAF Confederation Cup due to financial problems. It was the first season featuring twelve clubs, up from ten last season. The last two positions received relegation into the GFA League Second Division in the following season, they were the Gambia Ports Authority (GPA) and Interior FC.

== Overview ==
The season featured a total of 132 matches and scored a total of 186, more than last season.

Real de Banjul was the defending team of the title. Wallidan scored the most numbering 25, second were Samger and the Hawks with 22.

== Participating clubs ==
- Wallidan FC
- Steve Biko FC
- Real de Banjul
- Sea View FC
- Interior FC - Promoted from the Second Division
- Samger FC - Promoted from the Second Division
- Hawks FC
- Gambia Ports Authority FC
- Armed Forces FC
- Bakau United
- Sait Matty FC
- Gamtel FC

== League standings ==
Pos	Team	Pld	W	D	L	GF	GA	GD	Pts
1	Wallidan FC	22	10	9	3	25	15	+10	39
2	Samger FC	22	10	7	5	22	16	+6	37
3	Hawks FC	22	9	9	4	22	16	+6	36
4	Real de Banjul	22	6	13	3	14	9	+5	31
5	Armed Forces FC	22	6	11	5	16	14	+2	29
6	Sait Matty FC	22	7	6	9	19	17	+2	27
7	Gamtel FC	22	6	9	7	15	20	-5	27
8	Steve Biko FC	22	4	14	4	11	11	0	26
9	Sea View FC	22	6	7	9	13	18	-5	25
10	Bakau United	22	4	11	7	10	13	-3	23
11	Gambia Ports Authority FC	22	2	14	6	10	15	-5	20
12	Interior FC	22	2	10	10	9	22	-13	16

2008 CAF Champions League
2008 CAF Confederation Cup
Relegation into the GFA League Second Division

First Division 2008
Champions
Wallidan FC
16th title

== See also ==
- GFA League First Division
