= List of football clubs in the Gambia =

For a complete list see Category:Football clubs in the Gambia

== A ==
- Africell Football Club
- Armed Forces Football Club

== B ==
- Banjul Hawks
- Brikama United
- BK West United FC
- BK West United FC Academy

== G ==
- GAMTEL Football Club
- Gambia Ports Authority Football Club

== I ==
- Interior FC

== R ==
- Real de Banjul

== S ==
- Samger Football Club
- Sea View Football Club
- Steve Biko Football Club

== T ==
- Team Rhino

Ports fc

- Wallidan
