= 2009 First Division (The Gambia) =

GFA League First Division
- Season: 2009
- Champions: Wallidan FC
- Runner up: Samger FC
- Promoted: Brikama United; Tallinding United
- Relegated: Africell FC; Tallinding United
- Matches: 132
- Goals: 186 (1.41 per match)

The 2009 GFA League First Division season was the 41st of the amateur competition of the first-tier football in the Gambia. The competition was governed by the Gambian Football Association (GFA) . The season began on February 20 and finished earlier on May 23. The (Gambian) Armed Forces FC won the second title after finishing with 44 points and qualified into the 2010 CAF Champions League the following season. Wallidan FC was also winner of the 2009 Gambian Cup, runner up was Samger, not even that club qualified and competed in the 2010 CAF Confederation Cup due to financial problems. It was the first season featuring twelve clubs, up from ten last season. The last two positions received relegation into the GFA League Second Division in the following season, they were Africell and Tallinding United.

== Overview ==
The season featured a total of 132 matches and scored a total of 228 goals, more than last season.

Real de Banjul was again the defending team of the title. 25 goals were the highest scored both by the Armed Forces and 10th placed Brikama which had a club scored the most that was above the relegation zone, fourth was 22 goals scored by Bakau United, fourth place.

Four clubs finished with 31 points and were fourth place Bakau United, Hawks, Gamtel and seventh placed Samger, the only difference was Bakau scored 22 goals, Hawks and Gamtel had 17 goals, Hawks conceded 13 and Gamtel conceded 16 and Samger scored 16 goals. Also Hawks, Gamtel and Samger had 8 wins and 7 draws.

== Participating clubs ==
- Wallidan FC
- Steve Biko FC
- Real de Banjul
- Sea View FC
- Samger FC
- Africell FC - Promoted from the Second Division
- Hawks FC
- Gambia Ports Authority FC
- Armed Forces FC
- Bakau United
- Sait Matty FC
- Gamtel FC
- Tallinding United - Promoted from the Second Division

== League standings ==
Pos	Team	Pld	W	D	L	GF	GA	GD	Pts
1	Armed Forces FC	22	13	5	4	25	10	+15	44
2	Steve Biko FC	22	9	6	7	21	17	+4	33
3	Wallidan FC	22	8	9	5	20	16	+4	31
4	Bakau United	22	7	10	5	22	16	+4	31
5	Hawks FC	22	8	7	7	17	13	+4	31
6	Gamtel FC	22	8	7	7	17	16	+1	31
7	Samger FC	22	8	7	7	16	17	-1	31
8	Real de Banjul	22	7	8	7	17	20	-3	29
9	Sea View FC	22	7	5	10	17	20	-3	26
10	Brikama United	22	6	8	8	25	29	-4	26
11	Africell FC	22	5	7	10	14	26	-12	22
12	Tallinding United	22	4	5	13	17	28	-11	17

2008 CAF Champions League
2008 CAF Confederation Cup
Relegation into the GFA League Second Division

First Division 2009
Champions
Armed Forces FC
2nd title

== See also ==
- GFA League First Division
