= 2006 First Division (The Gambia) =

First Division
- Season: 2006
- Champions: Gambian Ports Authority
- Runner up: Gamtel FC
- Promoted: Gamtel FC; Kaira Silo FC
- Relegated: Sait Matty FC; Kaira Silo FC
- Matches: 86
- Goals: 107 (1.24 per match)

The 2006 First Division season was the 38th of the amateur competition of the first-tier football in the Gambia. The tournament was organized by the Gambian Football Association (GFA) . The season began on February 1 and finished in late April. The Gambia Ports Authority won the fifth title and qualified and competed in the 2007 CAF Champions League the following season. Hawks FC, winner of the 2005 Gambian Cup participated in the 2006 CAF Confederation Cup the following season..

The season featured a total of 162 matches and scored a total of 100 goals, less than half than last season and more than 40% from 2004.

Wallidan FC was once again the defending team of the title. Gambia Ports Authority finished with 33 points. Hawks scored the most goals numbering 16. Cherno Samba Academy scored the fewest numbering five.

== Participating clubs ==
- Wallidan FC
- Steve Biko FC
- Real de Banjul
- Interior FC - Promoted from the Second Division
- Hawks FC
- Gambia Ports Authority FC
- Armed Forces FC
- Bakau United
- Cherno Samba Academy FC (Samger) - Promoted from the Second Division
- Gamtel FC

== Overview ==
The league was contested by 10 teams with Wallidan FC again winning the championship.

== League standings ==
Pos	Team	Pld	W	D	L	GF	GA	GD	Pts
1	Gambia Ports Authority	17	10	3	4	14	6	+8	33
2	Gamtel FC	17	7	5	5	9	8	+1	26
3	Steve Biko FC	17	6	8	3	10	10	0	26'
4	Armed Forces FC	17	6	7	4	15	10	+5	25
5	Wallidan FC	16	7	3	6	14	13	+1	24
6	Hawks FC	15	5	7	3	16	8	+8	22
7	Bakau United FC	16	5	5	6	9	13	-4	20
8	Real de Banjul	16	4	7	4	9	7	2	19
9	Cherno Samba Academy	15	2	4	9	5	16	-11	10
10	Interior of the Gambia	16	1	7	8	6	16	-10	10

2005 CAF Champions League
2005 CAF Confederation Cup
Relegation to the Second Division

First Division 2006
Champions
Gambia Ports Authority
5th title

== See also ==
- GFA League First Division
