= 2017–18 GFA League First Division =

GFA League First Division
- Season: 2017–18
- Champions: Gamtel FC

The 2017–18 GFA League First Division is the 49th season of top-tier football in Gambia. The season began on 18 November 2017 and ended on 24 May 2018.

== Standings ==
Final table.

Pos	Team	Pld	W	D	L	GF	GA	GD	Pts	Relegation
1	Gamtel FC (C)	22	13	8	1	30	11	+19	47	
2	Real Banjul	22	13	3	6	26	15	+11	42	
3	Brikama United	22	9	9	4	23	16	+7	36	
4	Gambia Ports Authority FC	22	8	8	6	17	14	+3	32	
5	Fortune (Farato)	22	7	10	5	22	17	+5	31	
6	Armed Forces FC	22	7	10	5	20	16	+4	31	
7	Banjul United	22	6	8	8	18	23	−5	26	
8	Tallinding United	22	5	9	8	20	24	−4	24	
9	Hawks	22	5	9	8	19	24	−5	24	
10	Marimoo (Manjai)	22	4	11	7	14	18	−4	23	
11	Steve Biko (R)	22	1	12	9	9	20	−11	15	Relegation to lower division
12	Bombada FC (R)	22	2	7	13	19	39	−20	13	Relegation to lower division

Source: RSSSF
(C) Champions; (R) Relegated

== See also ==
- 2018 Gambian Cup
