= Football at the 2023 African Games – Men's team squads =

The following is a list of squads for each nation competing in men's football at the 2023 African Games in Accra.

The nationality for each club reflects the national association (not the league) to which the club is affiliated. A flag is included for coaches that are of a different nationality than their own national team. Those marked in bold have been capped at full International level.

== Group A ==
=== Gambia ===
Head coach: Abdoulie Bojang

The final squad was announced on 28 February 2024.

No.	Pos.	Player	Date of birth (age)	Club
	GK	Ebrima Jaiteh	19 December 2004 (aged 19)	(Gambia Football Federation) TMT FC
	GK	Youkasseh Sanyang	27 June 2004 (aged 19)	(Gambia Football Federation) Steve Biko FC
	GK	Ousman Camara		(Gambia Football Federation) Gambian Dutch Lions FC
	DF	Modou Jallow		(Gambia Football Federation) Steve Biko FC
	DF	Momodou Jatta	8 March 2006 (aged 17)	(Gambia Football Federation) Banjul United FC
	DF	Mamadou Bah	5 December 2003 (aged 20)	(Gambia Football Federation) Team Rhino FC
	DF	Yusupha Darboe		(Gambia Football Federation) Fortune FC
	DF	Jonathan Correa		(Gambia Football Federation) Brikama United FC
	DF	Omar Tamba		(Gambia Football Federation) Samger FC
	DF	Mustapha Nyassi	19 November 2007 (aged 16)	(Gambia Football Federation) Real de Banjul FC
	DF	Alieu Manneh	20 August 2006 (aged 17)	(Gambia Football Federation) Hawks FC
	MF	Ebrima Njie		
	MF	Ali Ousaye	9 April 2006 (aged 17)	(Gambia Football Federation) Fortune FC
	MF	Bakary Touray	15 March 2005 (aged 18)	(Gambia Football Federation) Falcons FC
	MF	Alasan Camara		(Gambia Football Federation) Real de Banjul FC
	FW	Abdurahman Jobe		(Gambia Football Federation) Hawks FC
	FW	Alasan Badjie		(Gambia Football Federation) Real de Banjul FC
	FW	Musa Sima		(Gambia Football Federation) Gambian Dutch Lions FC
	FW	Ismaila Manneh	2 February 2004 (aged 20)	(Gambia Football Federation) Steve Biko FC
	FW	Dawda Darboe	10 February 2004 (aged 20)	(Gambia Football Federation) Wallidan FC
	FW	Ousman Ceesay	8 July 2005 (aged 18)	(Gambia Football Federation) Falcons FC
	FW	Ebrima Ceesay	1 June 2006 (aged 17)	(Gambia Football Federation) BK Milan FC
	FW	Mansour Mbye	1 January 2003 (aged 21)	(Gambia Football Federation) Banjul United FC

=== Ghana ===
Head coach: Desmond Ofei

The final squad was announced on 5 March 2024.

No.	Pos.	Player	Date of birth (age)	Club
	GK	Yakubu Saeed	31 December 2006 (aged 17)	(Ghana Football Association) Medeama S.C.
	GK	Vincent Anane	15 August 2003 (aged 20)	(Ghana Football Association) Heart of Lions F.C.
	GK	Daniel Afful	3 September 2005 (aged 18)	(Ghana Football Association) Accra Lions FC
	DF	Aaron Essel	30 July 2005 (aged 18)	(Ghana Football Association) Bechem United F.C.
	DF	Asamoah Kuffour (c)	7 January 2006 (aged 18)	(Ghana Football Association) Berekum Chelsea F.C.
	DF	Remember Adomako Boateng	15 November 2004 (aged 19)	(Ghana Football Association) Accra Lions FC
	DF	Nana Kwame Boakye	5 December 2005 (aged 18)	(Ghana Football Association) Berekum City FC
	DF	Maxwell Azafokpe	28 December 2006 (aged 17)	(Ghana Football Association) International Allies F.C.
	DF	David Amuzu		
	MF	McCarthy Ofori	3 May 2005 (aged 18)	(Ghana Football Association) Dreams F.C.
	MF	Mohaison Mahmoud	21 April 2005 (aged 18)	(Ghana Football Association) Heart of Lions F.C.
	MF	Emmanuel Adjei		
	MF	Aziz Issah	20 November 2005 (aged 18)	(Ghana Football Association) Dreams F.C.
	MF	Frederick Kesse	12 August 2005 (aged 18)	(Ghana Football Association) Accra Lions FC
	MF	Abdul Hakim Sulemana	19 February 2005 (aged 19)	(French Football Federation) Olympique Lyonnais B
	MF	Emmanuel Mensah	10 July 2004 (aged 19)	(Romanian Football Federation) CSM Sighetu Marmației
	MF	Kelvin Nkrumah	11 September 2007 (aged 16)	(Ghana Football Association) Medeama S.C.
	FW	Aziz Misbau	11 September 2007 (aged 16)	(Ghana Football Association) Dreams F.C.
	FW	Jerry Afriyie	10 December 2006 (aged 17)	(Ghana Football Association) Thoughts FC
	FW	Michael Ephson	5 March 2004 (aged 20)	(Ghana Football Association) FC Samartex

== Group B ==
=== Nigeria ===
Head coach: Ladan Bosso

The final squad was announced on 5 March 2024.

No.	Pos.	Player	Date of birth (age)	Club
	GK	Nathaniel Nwosu	10 January 2006 (aged 18)	(Nigeria Football Federation) Water FC
	GK	Clinton Ezekiel	30 November 2005 (aged 18)	(Nigeria Football Federation) Calabar Rovers F.C.
	GK	Samuel James	5 April 2006 (aged 17)	(Nigeria Football Federation) Mavlon FC
	DF	Daniel Bameyi	4 January 2006 (aged 18)	(Nigeria Football Federation) Yum Yum FC
	DF	Ibrahim Abdullahi	27 October 2005 (aged 18)	(Nigeria Football Federation) Kano Pillars F.C.
	DF	Oladapo Akintola		
	DF	Godwin Sampson		(Nigeria Football Federation) Dakkada F.C.
	DF	Haruna Aliyu	2 January 2006 (aged 18)	(Nigeria Football Federation) Doma United F.C.
	DF	Rabiu Abdullahi	3 May 2005 (aged 18)	(Nigeria Football Federation) Tudun Wada United
	MF	Daniel Daga	10 January 2007 (aged 17)	(Nigeria Football Federation) Enyimba F.C.
	MF	Favour Izuogu Chibueze	3 May 2005 (aged 18)	(Nigeria Football Federation) Enyimba F.C.
	MF	Auwal Ibrahim	26 January 2006 (aged 18)	
	MF	Yinka Oladunjoye		(Nigeria Football Federation) Madiba FC
	MF	Suleiman Idris	19 October 2005 (aged 18)	(Nigeria Football Federation) Kano Pillars F.C.
	FW	Kehinde Ibrahim	15 January 2006 (aged 18)	
	FW	Charles Agada	3 September 2006 (aged 17)	(Nigeria Football Federation) Mavlon FC
	FW	Nasir Muhammed		(Nigeria Football Federation) Bendel Insurance F.C.
	FW	Sunday Joseph		(Nigeria Football Federation) Zamfara United F.C.
	FW	Olalekan Ibrahim	11 November 2003 (aged 20)	
	FW	Sadiq Isiyaka	6 June 2005 (aged 18)	(Nigeria Football Federation) Niger Tornadoes F.C.

=== Uganda ===
Head coach: Morley Byekwaso

The final squad was announced on 3 March 2024.

No.	Pos.	Player	Date of birth (age)	Club
	GK	Abdul Magada	25 January 2005 (aged 19)	(Federation of Uganda Football Associations) Gaddafi FC
	GK	Shamulan Kamya	3 July 2004 (aged 19)	(Federation of Uganda Football Associations) Bright Stars FC
	GK	Humphrey Oyirwoth	29 October 2004 (aged 19)	
	DF	Haruna Lukwago	6 November 2004 (aged 19)	(Federation of Uganda Football Associations) Kampala Capital City Authority FC
	DF	Ibrahim Juma	6 May 2004 (aged 19)	(Royal Spanish Football Federation) CD Leganés
	DF	Enock Luyima	21 April 2004 (aged 19)	(Federation of Uganda Football Associations) Vipers SC
	DF	Ronald Madoi	4 April 2004 (aged 19)	(Hellenic Football Federation) S.F.K. Pierikos
	DF	Apollo Kagogwe	18 February 2003 (aged 21)	(Federation of Uganda Football Associations) Wakiso Giants FC
	DF	Cyrus Kibande	22 September 2003 (aged 20)	(Federation of Uganda Football Associations) SC Villa
	DF	Rogers Torach	23 June 2003 (aged 20)	(Federation of Uganda Football Associations) Vipers SC
	MF	John Innocent Kisolo	18 November 2006 (aged 17)	(Federation of Uganda Football Associations) Uganda Revenue Authority FC
	MF	Ivan Irinimbabazi	1 February 2004 (aged 20)	(Hellenic Football Federation) S.F.K. Pierikos
	MF	Allan Oyirwoth	23 January 2007 (aged 17)	(The Football Association) Brooke House College
	MF	Hakim Mutebi	6 January 2006 (aged 18)	(Federation of Uganda Football Associations) SC Villa
	FW	Abbas Kyeyune	2 February 2005 (aged 19)	(Federation of Uganda Football Associations) SC Villa
	FW	Arafat Kiza Usama	27 June 2004 (aged 19)	(Federation of Uganda Football Associations) Kampala Capital City Authority FC
	FW	Jonah Patrick Kakande	25 April 2003 (aged 20)	(Federation of Uganda Football Associations) SC Villa
	FW	Shafiq Magogo	15 March 2004 (aged 19)	(Federation of Uganda Football Associations) Kitara F.C.
	FW	Alpha Thiery Ssali	29 December 2003 (aged 20)	(Federation of Uganda Football Associations) Express FC
	FW	Bruno Bunyaga	27 March 2004 (aged 19)	(Federation of Uganda Football Associations) Uganda Revenue Authority FC
