= 2005 First Division (The Gambia) =

First Division
- Season: 2005
- Champions: Wallidan FC
- Runner up: Gamtel FC
- Promoted: Gamtel FC; Kaira Silo FC
- Relegated: Sait Matty FC; Kaira Silo FC
- Matches: 90
- Goals: 133 (1.48 per match)
- Top goalscorer: (The Gambia) Pa Amadou Gai (9)

The 2005 First Division season was the 37th of the amateur competition of the first-tier football in the Gambia. The tournament was organized by the Gambian Football Association (GFA) . The season began on 7 January and finished on 3 July. Wallidan FC won the fifteenth title and qualified for and competed in the 2006 CAF Champions League the following season. Bakau United FC, winner of the 2005 Gambian Cup participated in the 2006 CAF Confederation Cup the following season..

The season featured a total of 162 matches and scored a total of 132 goals, less than half than last season.

Wallidan FC was the defending team of the title. Wallidan finished with 29 points, nearly a quarter less than last season and scored the most goals numbering 19, nearly 40% fewer than last season.

== Participating clubs ==
- Wallidan FC
- Steve Biko FC
- Real de Banjul
- Kaira SIlo FC - Promoted from the Second Division
- Hawks FC
- Gambia Ports Authority FC
- Armed Forces FC
- Bakau United FC
- Sait Matty FC
- Gamtel FC - Promoted from the Second Division

== Overview ==
The league was contested by 10 teams with Wallidan FC again winning the championship.

== League standings ==
Pos	Team	Pld	W	D	L	GF	GA	GD	Pts
1	Wallidan FC	18	6	11	1	19	11	+8	29
2	Gamtel FC	18	8	5	5	18	13	+5	29
3	Hawks FC	18	8	5	5	14	13	+1	29
4	Steve Biko FC	18	7	6	5	17	14	+3	27
5	Gambia Ports Authority	18	5	9	4	15	10	+5	24
6	Real de Banjul	18	6	5	7	13	18	-5	23
7	Bakau United FC	18	4	10	4	16	14	+2	22
8	Armed Forces FC	18	4	8	6	11	14	-3	20
9	Sait Matty FC	18	5	5	8	9	16	-7	20
10	Kaira Silo FC	18	2	6	10	11	20	-9	12

2005 CAF Champions League
2005 CAF Confederation Cup
Relegation to the Second Division

First Division 2003–04
Champions
Wallidan FC
15th title

== See also ==
- GFA League First Division
