= 2007 First Division (The Gambia) =

First Division
- Season: 2007
- Champions: Real de Banjul
- Runner up: Gamtel FC
- Promoted: Sait Matty FC; Sea View FC
- Relegated: none
- Matches: 86
- Goals: 140 (1.63 per match)

The 2007 First Division season was the 39th of the amateur competition of the first-tier football in the Gambia. The tournament was organized by the Gambian Football Association (GFA) . The season began on March 1 and finished on June 24. The Real de Banjul won the tenth title after finishing with 32 points, due to financial concerns, they did not participate by the GFA in the 2008 CAF Champions League the following season. Gambia Ports Authority, winner of the 2007 Gambian Cup and qualified and competed in the 2008 CAF Confederation Cup. It was the last season featuring ten clubs, two additional clubs would be added in the following season neither the last two clubs were relegated.

The season featured a total of 162 matches and scored a total of 140, nearly the same from the 2005 season with nearly 40% more.

Gambia Ports Authority was again the defending team of the title. Both Wallidan and Hawks of Banjul or Bajau scored the most goals numbering 19.

== Participating clubs ==
- Wallidan FC
- Steve Biko FC
- Real de Banjul
- Sea View FC - Promoted from the Second Division
- Hawks FC
- Gambia Ports Authority FC
- Armed Forces FC
- Bakau United
- Sait Matty FC - Promoted from the Second Division
- Gamtel FC

== Overview ==
The league was contested by 10 teams with Real de Banjul winning the championship.

== League standings ==
Pos	Team	Pld	W	D	L	GF	GA	GD	Pts
1	Real de Banjul	18	10	5	3	15	6	+9	35
2	Gamtel FC	18	9	5	4	19	15	+4	32
3	Wallidan FC	18	9	5	4	16	12	+4	32
4	Gambia Ports Authority FC	18	8	7	3	18	10	+8	31
5	Hawks FC	18	6	5	7	19	16	+8	23
6	Armed Forces FC	18	6	5	7	12	10	+2	23
7	Sait Matty FC	18	4	6	8	11	19	-8	18
8	Bakau United FC	18	3	7	8	11	19	-8	16
9	Sea View FC	18	4	4	10	11	17	-6	16'
10	Steve Biko FC	18	2	9	7	8	16	-8	15

2008 CAF Champions League
2008 CAF Confederation Cup

First Division 2006
Champions
Real de Banjul
10th title

== See also ==
- GFA League First Division
