= 2018 Gambian Cup =

Tournament details
- Country: Gambia

Final positions
- Champions: Armed Forces
- Runners-up: Brikama United

The 2018 Gambia Football Federation Cup was the 50th edition of the Gambian Cup since independence, the knockout football competition of Gambia.

== Quarter-finals ==
29 April 2018

Bombada	0–0	Marimoo
Penalties
	3-2

29 April 2018

Armed Forces	2–1	Red Hawks

30 April 2018

Real Banjul	1–1	Brikama United
Penalties
	4-5

30 April 2018

Wallidan	0–0	Serekunda East Bi
Penalties
	6-7

== Semi-finals ==
=== First Legs ===
3 May 2018

Bombada	0–0	Brikama United

3 May 2018

Armed Forces	1–0	Serekunda East Bi

=== Second Legs ===
18 May 2018

Brikama United	2–1	Bombada

Brikama United won 2-1 on aggregate.

31 May 2018

Serekunda East Bi	1–3	Armed Forces

Armed Forces won 4-1 on aggregate.

== Final ==
8 June 2018

Brikama United	3–4	Armed Forces

Independence Stadium, Bakau

== See also ==
- 2017–18 GFA League First Division
