= Ousman Jallow =

Gambian footballer (born 1988)

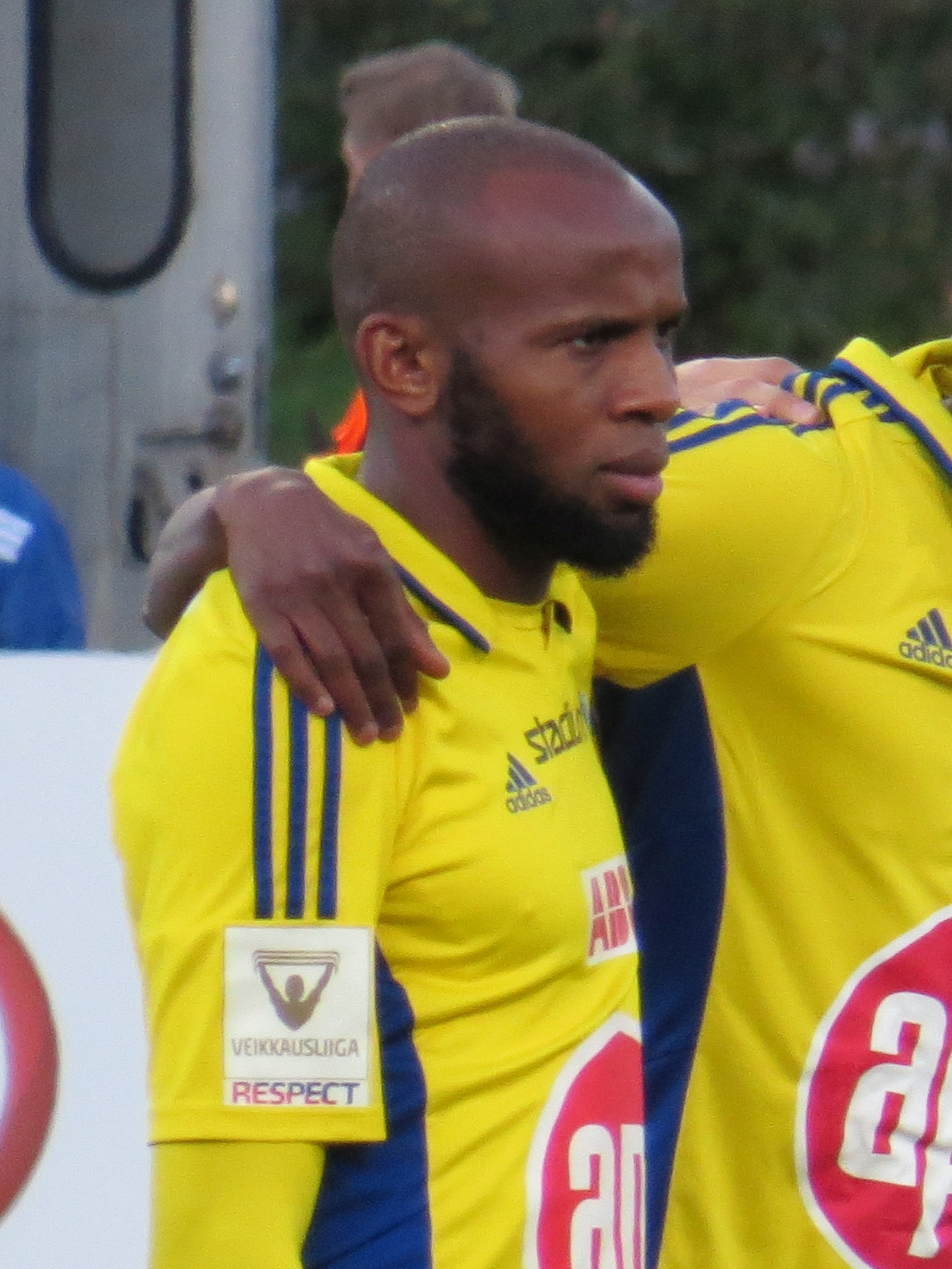
- Jallow with HJK Helsinki in 2015

Personal information
- Full name: Ousman Jallow
- Date of birth: 21 October 1988 (age 38)
- Place of birth: Banjul, Gambia
- Height: 1.81 m (5 ft 11 in)
- Position: Forward

Youth career
- Wallidan

Senior career*
Years	Team	Apps	(Gls)
2004–2005	Wallidan		
2005–2008	Al Ain	47	(19)
2006–2007	→ Raja Casablanca (loan)	19	(11)
2008–2011	Brøndby	70	(14)
2011–2013	Çaykur Rizespor	47	(19)
2015	HJK Helsinki	20	(6)
2016	Irtysh Pavlodar	21	(3)
2016–2017	HJK Helsinki	23	(6)
2019	Yenicami Ağdelen	1	

International career^{‡}
2007	Gambia U20	7	(5)
2008–	Gambia	14	(2)
- * Club domestic league appearances and goals as of 16:01, 12 February 2020 (UTC) ‡ National team caps and goals as of 8 October 2019

Ousman Jallow (born 21 October 1988 in Banjul) is a Gambian footballer who plays as a striker, most recently for Cypriot club Yenicami Ağdelen. He is featured on the Gambian national team in the official 2010 FIFA World Cup video game.

== Club career ==
=== Early career ===
Arsenal and Chelsea both chased Jallow and they almost bought him, but because of troubles with the residence/work permit, Jallow did not become an Arsenal or Chelsea player.

=== Brøndby ===
On 31 August 2008, the young striker signed a contract for three years with the Danish team Brøndby IF. The transfer amount was kept secret by both Brøndby IF and his former club; Al-Ain FC.

On 5 October 2008, Jallow scored his first goal in the Brøndby-jersey, against Odense BK.

His contract ended in Summer 2011. He joined on free transfer second division club Çaykur Rizespor.

=== HJK ===
On 27 February 2015, Finnish Veikkausliiga club HJK signed Jallow on a one-year contract after a short trial period.

=== Kazakhstan ===
On 27 February 2016, Jallow signed for Kazakhstan Premier League side FC Irtysh Pavlodar.

=== Return to HJK ===
On 8 August 2016, Jallow returned to HJK Helsinki, signing until the end of the 2017 season.

In the beginning of September 2019, Jallow joined Cypriot-Turkish club Yenicami. However, he left the club again after two weeks, having only played one game.

== International career ==
Jallow was a member of the Youth Gambia national football team and participated in the 2007 FIFA U-20 World Cup which was won by the Youth Argentina national football team and presented his homeland on African U-20 Championship in 2007. He made his international debut on 9 September 2007 against Algeria. Jallow was also a member of the Gambian side that won the U-17 African Nations Cup on home soil in 2005 and he scored the winning goal in the final.

== Career statistics ==
Appearances and goals by club, season and competition
Club	Season	League			Cup (Note: Includes Danish Cup, Turkish Cup, Suomen Cup and Kazakhstan Cup)		League cup (Note: Includes Finnish League Cup)		Europe		Total	
Club	Season	Division	Apps	Goals	Apps	Goals	Apps	Goals	Apps	Goals	Apps	Goals
Wallidan	2003–04	GFA League First Division					–		–			
Wallidan	2005	GFA League First Division					–		–			
Al Ain	2005–06	UAE Football League	15	11	0	0	–		–		15	11
Al Ain	2006–07	UAE Football League	0	0	0	0	–		–		0	0
Al Ain	2007–08	UAE Football League	20	11	0	0	–		–		20	11
Al Ain	Total		35	22	0	0	0	0	0	0	35	22
Raja Casablanca (loan)	2006–07	Botola Pro	19	11	0	0	–		–		19	11
Brøndby	2008–09	Danish Superliga	26	9	5	2	–		2 (Note: Appearances in UEFA Cup)	0	33	11
Brøndby	2009–10	Danish Superliga	23	5	1	0	–		4 (Note: Appearances in UEFA Europa League)	1	28	6
Brøndby	2010–11	Danish Superliga	21	0	0	0	–		6	4	27	4
Brøndby	Total		70	14	6	2	0	0	12	5	88	21
Çaykur Rizespor	2011–12	TFF 1. Lig	34	15	1	1	–		–		35	16
Çaykur Rizespor	2012–13	TFF 1. Lig	13	4	0	0	–		–		13	4
Çaykur Rizespor	Total		47	19	1	1	0	0	0	0	48	20
HJK	2015	Veikkausliiga	20	6	3	0	4	1	6 (Note: Appearances in UEFA Champions League and UEFA Europa League)	3	33	10
Irtysh Pavlodar	2016	Kazakhstan Premier League	21	3	1	0	–		–		22	3
HJK	2016	Veikkausliiga	3	2	–		–		–		3	2
HJK	2017	Veikkausliiga	20	4	4	0	–		4	1	28	5
HJK	Total		23	5	4	0	0	0	4	1	31	6
Bashundhara Kings	2017–18	Bangladesh Premier League					–		–			
Bashundhara Kings	2018–19	Bangladesh Premier League					–		–			
Yenicami Ağdelen	2019–20	KTFF Süper Lig	1	0	0	0	–		–		1	0
Career total			236	80	14	3	4	1	22	9	276	93

=== International ===
Gambia
Year	Apps	Goals
2007	1	0
2008	4	1
2009	0	0
2010	5	1
2011	3	0
2012	1	0
Total	14	2

Statistics accurate as of match played 29 February 2012

=== International goals ===
Scores and results list Gambia's goal tally first.

#	Date	Venue	Opponent	Score	Result	Competition
1.	6 September 2008	Independence Stadium Bakau, Banjul	Liberia	2–0	3–0	2010 World Cup qualifier
2.	4 September 2010	Independence Stadium Bakau, Banjul	Namibia	3–0	3–1	2012 Africa Cup of Nations qualifier
