= Adama Jarjue =

Gambian footballer

Personal information
- Date of birth: 12 December 1997 (age 28)
- Place of birth: the Gambia
- Height: 1.83 m (6 ft 0 in)
- Position: Midfielder

Team information
- Current team: Grbalj
- Number: 22

Senior career*
Years	Team	Apps	(Gls)
2016–2020	Gamtel		
2020	Zlatibor Čajetina	2	(0)
2021	Sloga Kraljevo	8	(2)
2022–2023	Real Banjul		
2024	Bokelj	11	(0)
2024–	Grbalj	10	(2)
- * Club domestic league appearances and goals as of 4 April 2025

Adama Jarjue (born 12 December 1997) is a Gambian professional footballer who plays as a midfielder for Montenegrin second-tier side Grbalj.

== Career ==
Jarjue played with Gambian local top-league side Gamtel FC until he signed with newly promoted Serbian top-league side FK Zlatibor Čajetina in summer 2020.

== International career ==
By September 2015 he was already part of the Gambia national under-20 football team.

He was part of the Gambia national under-23 football team on 17 May 2018, in a game against Morocco.

He was an unused substitute in a Gambia national football team game against Nigeria on 5 June 2021.

== Honours ==
Gamtel

- GFA League First Division: 2017–18
