= Football in the Gambia =

Football
- National team: men's national team

Club competitions
- GFA League First Division

International competitions
- Champions League; CAF Confederation Cup; Super Cup; FIFA Club World Cup; FIFA World Cup(National Team); African Cup of Nations(National Team)

Football is the most popular sport in The Gambia and still growing in popularity.

== National football team ==
The Gambia national football team, nicknamed The Scorpions, is the national team of the Gambia and is administered by the Gambia Football Association. They have never qualified for the World Cup. In the 2021 Africa Cup of Nations Gambia reached the second round of the competition for the first time.

== Men's league system ==
=== GFA League First Division ===
The GFA League First Division currently has twelve clubs competing in it. The most successful club is Wallidan.

=== GFA League Second Division ===
The GFA League First Division currently has ten clubs competing in it.

Gambia Football Federation Second Division (2023–24 and 2024–25)

During both the 2023–24 and 2024–25 seasons, the GFF Second Division featured 18 clubs competing in a double round-robin format. The top two teams earned automatic promotion to the GFF First Division, while the 3rd–5th placed teams participated in promotion play-offs alongside the 14th-placed First Division side to determine an additional promotion place. The bottom three teams were relegated to the regional third tier, with the 15th-placed side contesting a relegation play-off.

2023–24 Season

- Champions: Hawks (promoted)
- Runners-up: Hart Academy (promoted)
- Promotion play-offs: Gambian Dutch Lions defeated Gambia Ports Authority in the final to earn promotion; First Division side Wallidan were relegated.
- Relegated: Jam City, Immigration, Jarra West (Serrekunda United avoided relegation via play-off).
- Name changes: Medical renamed Gambian Dutch Lions; Tallinding United renamed RS Tallinding; GAMTEL renamed Serrekunda FC; PSV Wellingara renamed Unique Global.

2024–25 Season

- Champions: Gambia Ports Authority (promoted)
- Runners-up: Medina United (promoted)
- Promotion play-offs: Samger defeated RS Tallinding on penalties in the final; Samger promoted, Gambia Armed Forces relegated.
- Relegated: Latrikunda United, Waa Banjul, Essau United.
- Relegation play-off: Kanifing East beat ASM Athletic 2–0 to retain their Second Division status.
- Newly promoted into division for 2025–26: Sibanor United, AJ Soccer, North Star.
- Name change: Bakau Katchikally Milan renamed Colley Stars.

Top Scorers

Complete official records of Second Division top scorers are not publicly available for both seasons; however, some notable performances have been reported by local media:

2024–25 Season

- Omar Johm (Gambia Ports Authority) — 18 goals and 7 assists in 29 appearances.

Omar Johm (Omaro) – Quick Profile & Records

- Date of Birth: 28 February 2007 (age 18)
- Position: Forward player, two footed (versatile across attacking roles) for Gambia Ports Authority (GPA) in the GFF Second Division.

2023/24 Season

- Scored 13 league goals.
- Named Player of the Season in the division.

2024/25 Season

- Burst forward with 18 goals and 7 assists in 29 matches—that's 25 goal contributions, making him the Second Division's top scorer that season.
- Broke his own previous season record by increasing from 13 to 18 league goals.
- In the process, he also became GPA's all-time top goal scorer, surpassing a long-standing club record previously held by a club legend.

Style & Recognition

- Known for his two-footed play, tactical versatility across forward positions (wing, central, no. 7/9/10), and standout flair—earning the nickname “conductor of the orchestra”.
- His accolades include being a key driver behind GPA's promotion to the First Division after a three-year absence.

=== 3rd Division Triangular Tournament ===
promotion tournament to second division, top-2 qualify for second division.

=== National Third Division League ===
Locally known as “Nawettan” (This word is derived from the Wolof tongue, one of several local languages, and means seasonal tournament). It is the third-highest competition in the country's national football rankings and is divided into eight mini-leagues of twenty teams each in different zones, of which all league champions from the different Local Governing Bodies (LGB) are contested in the Second Division, qualifiers and only the best three of the eight teams will proceed to battle it out in the Triangular play-offs. The emerging two best of the three teams are finally promoted to the National Second Division League.

== Women's football ==
=== National Football League Division One ===
The National First Division currently has six clubs competing in it.

=== National Football League Division Two ===
The National First Division currently has five clubs competing in it.

== Football stadiums ==
The Independence Stadium is currently the largest stadium by capacity in Gambia. The Gambia national football team use the venue for home games.

Stadium	Capacity	City	Tenants	Image
Independence Stadium	20,000	Bakau	Gambia national football team	

== See also ==
- Gambian Cup
- GFA League First Division
- List of football clubs in the Gambia
- Lists of stadiums
