= 2003–04 First Division (The Gambia) =

First Division
- Season: 2003-04
- Champions: Wallidan FC
- Runner up: Hawks FC
- Promoted: Gamtel FC; Kaira Silo FC
- Relegated: Starlight Banjul; Talinding United
- Matches: 162
- Goals: 210 (1.3 per match)
- Top goalscorer: (The Gambia) Demba Savage (12)

The 2003-04 First Division season was the 36th of the amateur competition of the first-tier football in the Gambia. The tournament was organized by the Gambian Football Association (GFA) . The season began on 16 December 2003 and finished on 20 June 2004, this was their next in two years. Wallidan FC won the fourteenth title and finished with 38 points, Wallidan qualified and competed in the 2005 CAF Champions League the following season. As Wallidan won the 2004 Gambian Cup, second placed cup winner Armed Forces FC participated in the 2005 CAF Confederation Cup the following season..

Armed Forces FC was the defending team of the title. Wallidan finished with 38 points. Hawks FC scored the most goals and numbered 32.

== Participating clubs ==
- Wallidan FC
- Steve Biko FC
- Real de Banjul
- Tallinding United - Promoted from the Second Division
- Hawks FC
- Gambia Ports Authority FC
- Armed Forces FC
- Bakau United FC
- Sait Matty FC
- Starlight Banjul - Promoted from the Second Division

== Overview ==
The league was contested by 10 teams with Wallidan FC again winning the championship.

== League standings ==
Pos	Team	Pld	W	D	L	GF	GA	GD	Pts
1	Wallidan FC	18	11	5	2	27	11	+16	38
2	Hawks FC	18	11	2	5	32	17	+15	35
3	Gambia Ports Authority	18	9	4	5	26	12	+14	31
4	Armed Forces FC	18	9	3	6	20	13	+7	30
5	Steve Biko FC	18	9	1	8	25	28	-3	28
6	Real de Banjul	18	6	7	5	16	14	+2	25
7	Bakau United FC	18	6	3	9	22	25	-3	21
8	Sait Matty FC	18	4	7	7	17	26	-9	17
9	Starlight Banjul	18	2	5	11	14	32	-18	11
10	Tallinding United	18	2	5	11	11	32	-21	11

2005 CAF Champions League
2005 CAF Confederation Cup
Relegation to the Second Division

First Division 2003-04
Champions
Wallidan FC
14th title

== See also ==
- GFA League First Division
