= Mustapha Njie =

Gambian footballer

Personal information
- Full name: Mustapha Njie
- Date of birth: May 16, 1996 (age 30)
- Place of birth: Brikama, Gambia
- Height: 6 ft 2 in (1.88 m)
- Position: Striker

Youth career
- 2012–14: Bombada FC

Senior career*
Years	Team	Apps	(Gls)
2014–17	Bombada FC	64	(25)
2017–	LISCR FC	2	

International career
2015–	Gambia	2	(0)
- * Club domestic league appearances and goals

Mustapha Njie (born May 16, 1996) is a Gambian footballer who plays as a striker for the Liberian football club LISCR FC, in the Liberia First Division.

== Bombada FC ==
Njie was first spotted while playing for the Gambia Senior Secondary School by teams across the GFA League First Division and Second Division. Njie joined the newly established club Bombada FC. In his first year with Bombada FC, his side achieved promotion from the second division. He netted 10 goals and gave 3 assists in his first season in the Gambian top, helping Bombada FC remain in the top-flight. They finished sixth in the table for season 2014-15. He scored 7 goals in his second season in the First Division helping Bombada FC finish seventh in their league.

In his final year with the club, Bombada FC were unable to win a game and sat bottom of the table on zero points. Njie managed to score seven times and help them finish eighth in the 2016-17 First Division season. His performances for Bombada FC over the years attracted clubs within the First Division. After the 2016–17 season had come to an end, Njie ended his time with Bombada FC, when he agreed to join Liberia First Division club, LISCR FC.

== LISCR FC ==
Along with 3 other Gambians, Njie joined LISCR FC in 2017. His move to the Liberian side was heavily influenced by Gambian coach Tapha Manneh who is the current head coach of LISCR FC. Manneh joined LISCR FC before the start of the 2016-17 Liberian season and led the club to winning the 2016-17 Liberia First Division and Liberian Cup titles. Njie landed in Liberia in October 2017 to begin his career with the club that was preparing for the 2018 season and the 2018 CAF Champions League. After a series of test matches with the LISCR FC, including a preseason camp in Sierra Leone, Njie made his debut for the Shipping Boys in the preliminary round of the 2018 CAF Champions League against the Sudan Premier League team Al-Hilal Club (Omdurman) on February 11, 2018 at the Antoinette Tubman Stadium in Monrovia. He played all 90 minutes to help LISCR FC win the first leg 1–0. His CAF Champions League debut ended with a LISCR FC loss 3–0 in Sudan and losing 3–1 on aggregate.

Nije went on to play for LISCR FC for two more seasons until the end of the 2018/19 season. He helped to win 4 competitions in total for LISCR, the Liberian Premier League once, the CFA Cup twice, and the Super Cup once. He transferred to Gambian Club Brikama United at the end of the 2018/19 season.

== Brikama United ==
In 2019, Nije joined Brikama United, the current Gambian Premier League Winners, for an undisclosed amount. He currently plays for them as of 2024.

== International career ==
While featuring for Bombada FC in the GFA League First Division, Njie was called up to the Gambia national football team for an African Nations Championship qualifier against Senegal. His debut ended with disappointment as Gambia failed to qualify ahead of Senegal, losing 1–0 in the return leg at the Independence Stadium in Gambia.
