= Ousman Koli =

Gambian footballer (born 1988)

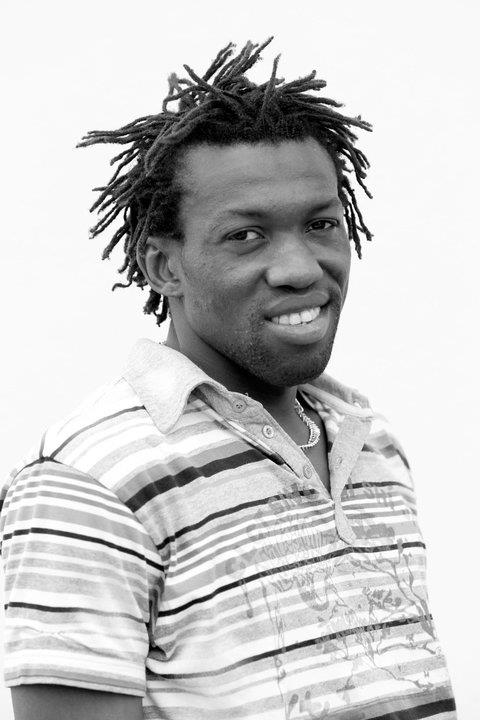

Personal information
- Date of birth: 18 October 1988 (age 38)
- Place of birth: Bakau, Gambia
- Height: 1.79 m (5 ft 10 in)
- Positions: Defender; midfielder

Youth career
- 2001–2002: Bakau United
- 2003–2004: Steve Biko

Senior career*
Years	Team	Apps	(Gls)
2004–2009	Steve Biko		
2009–2010	Red Star Saint-Ouen	3	(0)
2010–2011	Radomlje	9	(0)
2011–2012	Šenčur	11	(1)
2012	Triglav Kranj	5	(0)
2012–2013	Mohammedan Dhaka	12	(0)
2013	Muktijoddha Shangsad KC	10	(0)
2013–2014	Ankaran Hrvatini	33	(1)
2015	Mosta	9	(0)
2015–2016	Mladost Doboj Kakanj	0	(0)
2016	Sala FF	5	(0)
2017	Boo FK	0	(0)
2020–2021	IB 1975 Ljubljana	0	(0)

International career
- Gambia U17
2007–2015	Gambia	8	(0)
- * Club domestic league appearances and goals

Ousman Koli (born 18 October 1988) is a Gambian retired footballer who played as a defender.

== Club career ==
Born in Bakau, Koli began his career in 2001 with Bakau United and joined their league rivals Steve Biko in 2003.

In August 2011, he signed a contract with Slovenian second tier side Šenčur.

In February 2012, Koli joined Slovenian top flight team Triglav Kranj.

== International career ==
Koli was a member of the Gambia under-17 team that won the 22 July Peace Tournament, held in Banjul in 2003. He was also included in the squad that won the first-ever international trophy for Gambia, when the team hosted and won the 2005 African U-17 Championship.

He debuted for the senior team in 2007 in a match against Guinea.
