= Biri Biri =

Gambian footballer (1948–2020)

Personal information
- Full name: Alhaji Momodo Njie
- Date of birth: 30 March 1948
- Place of birth: Banjul, Gambia
- Date of death: 19 July 2020 (aged 72)
- Place of death: Dakar, Senegal
- Height: 1.77 m (5 ft 10 in)
- Position: Right winger

Youth career
- Black Star
- Black Diamonds
- White Phantoms
- Arrance
- 1963–1965: Mighty Blackpool

Senior career*
Years	Team	Apps	(Gls)
1965–1970	Augustinians		
1970	Derby County	0	(0)
1970–1972	Wallidan		
1972–1973	B.1901		
1973–1978	Sevilla	99	(32)
1978–1981	Herfølge		
1981–1986	Wallidan		

International career
1963–1987	Gambia	7+	(4+)
- * Club domestic league appearances and goals

Alhaji Momodo Njie (30 March 1948 – 19 July 2020), also known as Biri Biri, was a Gambian footballer who played as a right winger. He most notably played for Sevilla in Spain and Herfølge in Denmark. He was also a Gambian international footballer, and is regarded by several as the best Gambian footballer of all time.

== Early Life and Background ==
Njie was born in March 1948 in Banjul, the Gambia.

== Club career ==
Before his time in Europe, Biri Biri played for Black Stars, Black Diamonds, White Phantoms and Augustinians in Gambia as well as Mighty Blackpool of Sierra Leone.

Biri Biri was spotted by Danish club B.1901 during a training camp in Gambia in 1972. He left them in 1973 for Spanish team Sevilla. He was the first black player to play for Sevilla, and was considered one of their best players. Biri Biri returned to Denmark to play for Herfølge in 1980, and in 1981 he signed for Wallidan back in Gambia, for whom he played until retirement in 1987.

== International career ==
Biri Biri played on multiple occasions for The Gambia's national men's football team, starting as a youth in 1963.

== Retirement ==
Biri Biri was appointed as Deputy Mayor of Banjul after Yahya Jammeh came to power in 1994, a post he had relinquished by 2005. He also worked as the manager of Royal Albert market in the city. In 2000, Jammeh awarded him the Order of Merit, and he was described as The Gambia's "greatest footballer of the last millennium and of all time."

== Death ==
Biri Biri died on 19 July 2020, aged 72, in Dakar, Senegal.
