= 1986 African Cup Winners' Cup =

Tournament details
- Dates: April - 7 December 1986
- Teams: 38 (from 1 confederation)

Final positions
- Champions: (Egypt) Al Ahly (3rd title)
- Runners-up: (Gabon) AS Sogara

Tournament statistics
- Matches played: 64
- Goals scored: 149 (2.33 per match)

The 1986 season of the African Cup Winners' Cup football club tournament was won by Al Ahly in two-legged final victory against AS Sogara. This was the twelfth season that the tournament took place for the winners of each African country's domestic cup. Thirty-eight sides entered the competition, with AS Police withdrawing before the 1st leg of the preliminary round.

== Preliminary round ==
Team 1	Agg.	Team 2	1st leg	2nd leg
Al-Merrikh SC (Al-Obeid) (Sudan)	1–2	(Central African Republic) AS Tempête Mocaf	1–1	0–1
CD Elá Nguema (Equatorial Guinea)	1–3	(Burkina Faso) AS Fonctionnaires	0–0	1–3
Mbabane Highlanders (Eswatini)	5–4	(Rwanda) SC Kiyovu Sport	4–2	1–2
Kamboi Eagles F.C. (Sierra Leone)	w/o	(Mauritania) ASC Police	—	—
LPF Maseru (Lesotho)	2–3	(Madagascar) Fortior Mahajanga	0–0	2–3
Starlight Banjul (The Gambia)	4–2	(Guinea-Bissau) Benfica de Bissau	3–1	1–1
Vital'O F.C. (Burundi)	2–2 (a)	(Somalia) FC Petroleum	1–0	1–2

== First round ==
Team 1	Agg.	Team 2	1st leg	2nd leg
Al Ahly (Egypt)	2–1	(Uganda) Express FC	2–0	0–1
AS Kaloum Star (Guinea)	1–2	(Morocco) Difaâ El Jadidi	1–0	0–2
AS Sogara (Gabon)	3–1	(Ghana) Sekondi Hasaacas F.C.	3–0	0–1
AS Tempête Mocaf (Central African Republic)	2–3	(Egypt) Ismaily SC	2–0	0–3
AS Dragons FC de l'Ouémé (Benin)	ab	(Nigeria) Abiola Babes	2–0^{1}	—
Ferroviário da Huíla (Angola)	1–3	(Zaire) AS Kalamu	1–3	0–0
Foadan F.C. (Togo)	4–2	(Ivory Coast) SC Gagnoa	3–0	1–2
AS Fonctionnaires (Burkina Faso)	2–5	(Libya) Al-Ahli	1–0	1–5
Fortior Mahajanga (Madagascar)	2–3	(Tanzania) Miembeni SC	2–2	0–1
Mbabane Highlanders (Eswatini)	3–3 (a)	(Ethiopia) Eritrea Shoe Factory	1–1	2–2
Highlanders F.C. (Zimbabwe)	1–5	(Zambia) Power Dynamos F.C.	1–3	0–2
MP Oran (Algeria)	dq	(Sierra Leone) Kamboi Eagles F.C.	—	—
Mighty Barrolle (Liberia)	2–1	(Cameroon) Union Douala	0–0	2–1
Starlight Banjul (The Gambia)	2–2 (3–4 p)	(Senegal) ASC Diaraf	1–1	1–1
Vital'O F.C. (Burundi)	1–2	(Kenya) AFC Leopards	1–1	0–1
CS Hammam-Lif (Tunisia)	bye			

- 1: 1st leg was abandoned and both teams were disqualified; Dragons for fielding two ineligible players, Abiola for the pitch invasion by its supporters.

== Second round ==
Team 1	Agg.	Team 2	1st leg	2nd leg
AFC Leopards (Kenya)	2–4	(Zaire) AS Kalamu	1–1	1–3
Difaâ El Jadidi (Morocco)	dq^{1}	(Libya) Al-Ahli	—	—
ASC Diaraf (Senegal)	2–2 (a)	(Tunisia) CS Hammam-Lif	2–1	0–1
Mbabane Highlanders (Eswatini)	0–8	(Egypt) Al Ahly	0–5	0–3
Ismaily SC (Egypt)	1–0	(Algeria) MP Oran	1–0	0–0
Miembeni SC (Tanzania)	1–5	(Zambia) Power Dynamos	1–1	0–5
Mighty Barrolle (Liberia)	3–4	(Togo) Foadan F.C.	3–2	0–2
AS Sogara (Gabon)	bye^{2}			

- 1: Al-Ahli SC (Tripoli) was disqualified before 1st leg after the Libyan FF had been suspended by CAF for not paying its subscription dues.
- 2: AS Sogara were to play against the winners of Dragons de l'Ouémé vs Abiola Babes (both disqualified).

== Quarterfinals ==
Team 1	Agg.	Team 2	1st leg	2nd leg
Al Ahly (Egypt)	2–1	(Zambia) Power Dynamos	2–0	0–1
AS Sogara (Gabon)	5–2	(Togo) Foadan F.C.	3–1	2–1
Difaâ El Jadidi (Morocco)	0–0 (3–4 p)	(Tunisia) CS Hammam-Lif	0–0	0–0
AS Kalamu (Zaire)	2–3	(Egypt) Ismaily SC	2–0	0–3

== Semifinals ==
Team 1	Agg.	Team 2	1st leg	2nd leg
Al Ahly (Egypt)	1–1 (a)	(Egypt) Ismaily SC	0–0	1–1
CS Hammam-Lif (Tunisia)	0–3	(Gabon) AS Sogara	0–0	0–3

== Final ==
Team 1	Agg.	Team 2	1st leg	2nd leg
Al Ahly (Egypt)	3–2	(Gabon) AS Sogara	3–0	0–2

== Champions ==
African Cup Winners' Cup Winners
(Egypt)
Al Ahly
Third and keep the trophy forever title
