= GFA League Second Division =

Gambian association football league

GFF League Second Division
- Founded: 1969
- Country: Gambia
- Confederation: CAF
- Number of clubs: 18
- Level on pyramid: 2
- Promotion to: GFA League First Division
- Relegation to: GFA League Third Division
- Domestic cup: Gambian Cup

The GFF League Second Division is the second highest division of football in Gambia.

== Previous champions ==
- 2004: Kaira Silo
- 2005: Interior FC
- 2006: Sait Matty Football Club
- 2007: Interior FC
- 2008: Brikama United
- 2009: Gambia Ports Authority
- 2010: Africell Football Club (Bakau)
- 2011: Banjul Hawks FC
- 2012: Interior FC
- 2013: Wallidan
- 2014: Bombada United
- 2015-16: Marimoo FC
- 2016-17: Fortune FC
- 2017-18: Samger FC
- 2018-19: Waa Banjul
- 2019-20: Latricunda United (abandoned)
- 2021: Falcons FC
- 2021-22: PSV Wellingara
- 2023: Today Makes Tomorrow FC
- 2023-24: Hawks FC
- 2024-25: Gambia Ports Authority FC
- 2025-26: Colley Stars FC
