= 1982 WAFU Club Championship =

Tournament details
- Teams: 12 (from 1 confederation)

Final positions
- Champions: (Ghana) Sekondi Hasaacas (1st title)
- Runners-up: (Nigeria) Spartans of Owerri

Tournament statistics
- Matches played: 26
- Goals scored: 52 (2 per match)

The 1982 WAFU Club Championship was the sixth football club tournament season that took place for the runners-up of each West African country's domestic league, the West African Club Championship. It was won by Ghana's Sekondi Hasaacas with a two-legged final victory against Spartans of Owerri of Nigeria. The runner-up was AS Police of Senegal. It featured 14 clubs and 26 matches. A total of 52 goals were scored.

== Preliminary round ==
The matches took place from May 31 to June 14.

Team 1	Agg.	Team 2	1st leg	2nd leg
USC Bassam (Ivory Coast)	0–2	(Guinea) Olympique Kakandé	0–1	1–0
SEIB Djourbel (Senegal)	1–1 (2–4 p)	(Sierra Leone) Mighty Blackpool	1–0	1–0
Stade Malien (Mali)	3–0	(Mauritania) ASAC Concorde	3–0	0–0
Buffles de Borgou (Benin)	1–9	(Nigeria) Spartans of Owerri	0–4	5–1
Saint Joseph Warriors (Liberia)	0–3	(Togo) Aiglons de Lomè	0–0	0–3
Starlight Banjul (The Gambia)	2–2 (3–5 p)	(Guinea-Bissau) UD Internacional de Bissau	1–1	1–1

== Intermediary Round ==
The matches took place from June 20 and July 4.

Team 1	Agg.	Team 2	1st leg	2nd leg
Olympique Kakandé (Guinea)	1–3	(Mali) Stade Malien	1–1	2–0
Spartans of Owerri (Nigeria)	3–1	(Ivory Coast) Stella Club d'Adjamé	3–0	1–0
Mighty Blackpool (Sierra Leone)	3–4	(Ghana) Sekondi Hasaacas	1–1	2–3
Aiglons de Lomé (Togo)	3–0	(Guinea-Bissau) UD Internacional	1–0	0–2

== Semifinals ==
The matches took place from July 18 to August 1

Team 1	Agg.	Team 2	1st leg	2nd leg
Stade Malien (Mali)	1–3	(Ghana) Sekondi Hasaacas	1–2	1–0
Spartans of Owerri (Nigeria)	4–1	(Togo) Aiglons de Lomé	4–0	1–0

== Finals ==
The matches took place on 16 and 30 October.

Team 1	Agg.	Team 2	1st leg	2nd leg
Spartans of Owerri (Nigeria)	0–1	(Ghana) Sekondi Hasaacas	0–1	0–0

== Winners ==
1982 WAFU Club Championship
(Ghana)
Sekondi Hasaacas
First title

== See also ==
- 1982 African Cup of Champions Clubs
- 1982 CAF Cup Winners' Cup
