= Ansumana Samateh =

Gambian footballer

Ansu Samateh
Personal information
- Full name: Ansumana Samateh
- Date of birth: November 26, 1987 (age 38)
- Place of birth: The Gambia
- Height: 1.72 m (5 ft 7 1/2 in)
- Position: Goalkeeper

Team information
- Current team: Wallidan F.C.
- Number: 16

Youth career
- 2000–2002: Wallidan F.C.

Senior career*
Years	Team	Apps	(Gls)
2002–	Wallidan F.C.	62	(0)

International career
2008	Gambia	1	(0)
- * Club domestic league appearances and goals as of November 17, 2008

Ansumana Samateh (born November 26, 1987) is a Gambian footballer who plays for Wallidan F.C.

== Career ==
Samateh began his career on youth side from Wallidan F.C. and was promoted to first team in January 2002.

== International career ==
He is in the extended squad from the Gambia national football team.
