= Mass Manga =

Gambian footballer

Personal information
- Date of birth: 1 January 1995 (age 31)
- Place of birth: Serekunda, Gambia
- Height: 1.89 m (6 ft 2 1/2 in)
- Position: Midfielder

Team information
- Current team: Banjul Hawks

Senior career*
Years	Team	Apps	(Gls)
2014–	Banjul Hawks		

International career^{‡}
2015–	Gambia	3	(0)
- * Club domestic league appearances and goals as of 15:19, 2 March 2018 (UTC) ‡ National team caps and goals as of 15:19, 2 March 2018 (UTC)

Mass Manga (born 1 January 1995) is a Gambian international footballer who plays for Banjul Hawks, as a midfielder.

== Career ==
Born in Serekunda, he has played club football for Banjul Hawks.

He made his international debut for Gambia in 2015.
