= 1987 African Cup Winners' Cup =

Tournament details
- Dates: April - 5 December 1987
- Teams: 35 (from 1 confederation)

Final positions
- Champions: (Kenya) Gor Mahia (1st title)
- Runners-up: (Tunisia) Espérance

Tournament statistics
- Matches played: 60
- Goals scored: 140 (2.33 per match)
- Top scorer: (Kenya) Peter Dawo (10 goals)

The 1987 season of the African Cup Winners' Cup football club tournament was won by Gor Mahia in two-legged final victory against Espérance Sportive de Tunis. This was the thirteenth season that the tournament took place for the winners of each African country's domestic cup. Thirty-five sides entered the competition, with Libya F.C. disqualified before the 1st leg of the preliminary round, Real Republicans withdrawing before the 1st leg of the same round and finally, Ela Nguema and SC de Bafatá withdrawing before the 1st leg of the first round.

== Preliminary round ==
Team 1	Agg.	Team 2	1st leg	2nd leg
Lesotho Defence Force FC	2–2^{1}	(Eswatini) Mbabane Swallows	1–1	1–1
Stade Malien (Mali)	^{2}	(Sierra Leone) Real Republicans	w/o	w/o
Libya FC	^{3}	(Guinea-Bissau) SC de Bafatá	w/o	w/o

- 1: Royal Lesotho Defence Force FC won 5–3 pen.
- 2: Real Republicans withdrew.
- 3: Libya FC were disqualified.

== First round ==
Team 1	Agg.	Team 2	1st leg	2nd leg
Abiola Babes (Nigeria)	^{1}	(Equatorial Guinea) CD Elá Nguema	w/o	w/o
Al-Merrikh (Sudan)	3–0	(Uganda) Blue Bats FC	1–0	2–0
Olympique Kakandé (Guinea)	1–7	(Benin) Dragons de l'Ouémé	0–3	1–4
AS Douanes (Senegal)	3–4	(Ivory Coast) ASEC Mimosas	2–0	1–4
Estrela Vermelha (Mozambique)	0–4	(Zambia) Nchanga Rangers	0–1	0–3
ASC Garde Nationale (Mauritania)	1–7	(Tunisia) Espérance	1–3	0–4
Highlanders FC (Zimbabwe)	1–1^{2}	(Tanzania) Miembeni S.C.	1–0	0–1
Inter Luanda (Angola)	1–3	(Burundi) Vital'O	1–1	0–2
LPRC Oilers (Liberia)	1–1^{3}	(Togo) Entente II	1–1	0–0
Marine Club FC (Somalia)	0–5	(Kenya) Gor Mahia	0–2	0–3
Mukura Victory Sports FC (Rwanda)	1–6	(Egypt) Al-Tersana	1–1	0–5
Okwahu United (Ghana)	3–1	(Zaire) AS Kalamu	2–0	1–1
Lesotho Defence Force FC	3–4	(Madagascar) Fortior Mahajanga	3–2	0–2
Rail Douala (Cameroon)	1–2	(Gabon) USM Libreville	1–0	0–2
Stade Malien (Mali)	0–5	(Morocco) FAR Rabat	0–1	0–4
WKF Collo (Algeria)	^{4}	(Guinea-Bissau) SC de Bafatá	w/o	w/o

- 1: Elá Nguema withdrew
- 2: Miembeni won 5–2 pen.
- 3: Entente II won on away goals.
- 4: SC de Bafatá withdrew.

== Second round ==
Team 1	Agg.	Team 2	1st leg	2nd leg
Abiola Babes (Nigeria)	2–2^{1}	(Ivory Coast) ASEC Mimosas	2–0	0–2
Al-Merrikh (Sudan)	1–1^{2}	(Kenya) Gor Mahia	1–1	0–0
Al-Tersana (Egypt)	0–2	(Tunisia) Espérance	0–0	0–2
Dragons de l'Ouémé (Benin)	1–1^{3}	(Gabon) USM Libreville	1–0	0–1
Entente II (Togo)	2–0	(Ghana) Okwahu United	2–0	0–0
Fortior Mahajanga (Madagascar)	3–4	(Zambia) Nchanga Rangers	2–2	1–2
Miembeni S.C. (Tanzania)	1–4	(Burundi) Vital'O	0–1	1–3
WKF Collo (Algeria)	4–7	(Morocco) FAR Rabat	3–2	1–5

- 1: Abiola Babes won 4–2 pen.
- 2: Gor Mahia won on away goals.
- 3: Dragons de l'Ouémé won 4–2 pen.

== Quarter finals ==
Team 1	Agg.	Team 2	1st leg	2nd leg
Dragons de l'Ouémé (Benin)	2–1	(Burundi) Vital'O	2–0	0–1
FAR Rabat (Morocco)	2–3	(Tunisia) Espérance	1–0	1–3
Gor Mahia (Kenya)	4–1	(Togo) Entente II	4–1	0–0
Nchanga Rangers (Zambia)	2–3	(Nigeria) Abiola Babes	1–1	1–2

== Semi finals ==
Team 1	Agg.	Team 2	1st leg	2nd leg
Abiola Babes (Nigeria)	1–2	(Tunisia) Espérance	1–0	0–2
Dragons de l'Ouémé (Benin)	2–3	(Kenya) Gor Mahia	0–0	2–3

== Final ==
Team 1	Agg.	Team 2	1st leg	2nd leg
Espérance (Tunisia)	3–3^{1}	(Kenya) Gor Mahia	2–2	1–1

- 1: Gor Mahia won on away goals.

African Cup Winners' Cup Winners
(Kenya)
Gor Mahia
First title
