= 1967 African Cup of Champions Clubs =

Tournament details
- Dates: April – 26 November 1967
- Teams: 18

Final positions
- Champions: (Democratic Republic of the Congo) TP Englebert (1st title)
- Runners-up: (Ghana) Asante Kotoko

Tournament statistics
- Matches played: 23
- Goals scored: 72 (3.13 per match)
- Top scorer(s): (Democratic Republic of the Congo) Pierre Kalala (5 goals)

The African Cup of Champions Clubs 1967 was the 3rd edition of the annual international club football competition held in the CAF region (Africa), the African Cup of Champions Clubs. It determined that year's club champion of association football in Africa.

The tournament was played by 18 teams and used a knock-out format with ties played home and away. TP Englebert from Congo-Kinshasa won the final, and became CAF club champion for the first time.

== Preliminary round ==
Team 1	Agg.	Team 2	1st leg	2nd leg
AS Fonctionnaires (Republic of Upper Volta)	w/o^{1}	(The Gambia) Augustinians FC	—	—
Secteur 6 (Niger)	4–5	(Libya) Al-Ittihad	3–2	1–3

^{1} Augustinians FC withdrew.

== First round ==
Team 1	Agg.	Team 2	1st leg	2nd leg
Al-Ittihad (Libya)	w/o^{1}	(Cameroon) Diamant Yaoundé	—	—
Djoliba AC (Mali)	w/o^{1}	(Liberia) Invincible Eleven	—	—
Saint-George SA (Ethiopia)	w/o^{1}	(Uganda) Bitumastic	—	—
Stade d'Abidjan (Ivory Coast)	2–1	(Togo) Modèle Lomé	2–1	0–0
Al-Hilal Club (Sudan)	1–4	(United Arab Republic) Olympic (Alexandria)	0–1	1–3
AS Fonctionnaires (Republic of Upper Volta)	1–3	(Guinea) Conakry II	0–2	1–1
TP Englebert (Democratic Republic of the Congo)	3–3^{2}	(Republic of the Congo) Abeilles FC	2–0	1–3
Asante Kotoko (Ghana)	6–2	(Senegal) Saint-Louisienne	3–2	3–0

^{1} Diamant Yaoundé, Invincible Eleven and Bitumastic withdrew.
^{2} TP Englebert won after a drawing of lots.

== Quarter-finals ==
Team 1	Agg.	Team 2	1st leg	2nd leg
Al-Ittihad (Libya)	w/o^{1}	(Democratic Republic of the Congo) TP Englebert	—	—
Djoliba AC (Mali)	2–1	(Guinea) Conakry II	2–1	0–0
Saint-George SA (Ethiopia)	5–2	(United Arab Republic) Olympic (Alexandria)	3–2	2–0^{2}
Stade d'Abidjan (Ivory Coast)	3–8	(Ghana) Asante Kotoko	1–3	2–5

^{1} Al-Ittihad withdrew.
^{2} Olympic (Alexandria) withdrew after the first leg.

== Semi-finals ==
Team 1	Agg.	Team 2	1st leg	2nd leg
Asante Kotoko (Ghana)	3–2	(Mali) Djoliba AC	1–1	2–1
TP Englebert (Democratic Republic of the Congo)	4–3	(Ethiopia) Saint-George SA	3–1	1–2

== Final ==
19 November 1967
--:-- UTC+0

Asante Kotoko (Ghana)	1–1	(Democratic Republic of the Congo) TP Englebert
Goal		Goal

Kumasi Stadium, Kumasi
26 November 1967
--:-- UTC+1

TP Englebert (Democratic Republic of the Congo)	2–2 (a.e.t.)	(Ghana) Asante Kotoko
Kabeya; Kalala (pen.)		O. Kofi; Kofi Pare

20 May Stadium, Kinshasa
Referee: Sendi (Uganda)

Aggregate 3–3, replay required.

TP Englebert	Asante Kotoko

27 December 1967
--:-- UTC+1

TP Englebert (Democratic Republic of the Congo)	Cancelled^{1}	(Ghana) Asante Kotoko

Stade Akwa, Douala

^{1} At the expiration of extra time in the second leg, the referee decided that lots would be drawn to attribute the trophy on the next day, but the CAF secretary-general later arrived, with Cup regulations requiring that a third match be played.

The decider was set for December 27, in Yaoundé, Cameroon, but Asante Kotoko failed to appear (apparently not having been informed of the match arrangements by the Ghanaian FA); as a result, TP Englebert were declared champions.

== Champion ==
1967 African Cup of Champions Clubs

TP Englebert
First Title

== Top scorers ==
The top scorers from the 1967 African Cup of Champions Clubs are as follows:

Rank	Name	Team	Goals
1	(Democratic Republic of the Congo) Pierre Kalala	(Democratic Republic of the Congo) TP Englebert	5
2
2	(Ghana) Osei Kofi	(Ghana) Asante Kotoko	2
2	(United Arab Republic) Mahmoud Badawi	(United Arab Republic) El-Olympi	2
2	(United Arab Republic) Ahmed El-Qazzaz	(United Arab Republic) El-Olympi	2
2	(Democratic Republic of the Congo) Léonard Saidi	(Democratic Republic of the Congo) TP Englebert	2
2	(Democratic Republic of the Congo) Kamunda Tshinabu	(Democratic Republic of the Congo) TP Englebert	2
