= 2016–17 GFA League First Division =

GFA League First Division
- Season: 2016–17

The 2016–17 GFA League First Division is the 48th season of top-tier football in Gambia. The season began on 19 November 2016 and concluded on 29 May 2017.

== Standings ==
| Pos | Team | Pld | W | D | L | GF | GA | GD | Pts | Qualification or relegation |
|---|---|---|---|---|---|---|---|---|---|---|
| 1 | Armed Forces | 22 | 13 | 7 | 2 | 28 | 12 | +16 | 46 | Champions |
| 2 | Marimoo | 22 | 10 | 9 | 3 | 19 | 11 | +8 | 39 | |
| 3 | Real Banjul | 22 | 10 | 8 | 4 | 32 | 20 | +12 | 38 | |
| 4 | Brikama United | 22 | 7 | 9 | 6 | 20 | 16 | +4 | 30 | |
| 5 | Hawks | 22 | 7 | 9 | 6 | 22 | 21 | +1 | 30 | |
| 6 | Gambia Ports Authority | 22 | 6 | 10 | 6 | 20 | 16 | +4 | 28 | |
| 7 | Tallinding United | 22 | 7 | 7 | 8 | 17 | 22 | −5 | 28 | |
| 8 | Bombada | 22 | 6 | 6 | 10 | 30 | 31 | −1 | 24 | |
| 9 | GAMTEL | 22 | 5 | 8 | 9 | 20 | 22 | −2 | 23 | |
| 10 | Steve Biko | 22 | 5 | 8 | 9 | 14 | 23 | −9 | 23 | |
| 11 | Serekunda United | 22 | 3 | 11 | 8 | 13 | 25 | −12 | 20 | Relegated |
| 12 | Samger | 22 | 2 | 10 | 10 | 14 | 30 | −16 | 16 | Relegated |

Source: rsssf.com
