= 1975 African Cup Winners' Cup =

Tournament details
- Dates: April - 14 December 1975
- Teams: 15 (from 1 confederation)

Final positions
- Champions: (Cameroon) Tonnerre Yaoundé (1st title)
- Runners-up: (Ivory Coast) Stella Club d'Adjamé

Tournament statistics
- Matches played: 25
- Goals scored: 59 (2.36 per match)

The 1975 African Cup Winners' Cup was the first edition of the African Cup Winners' Cup. The tournament was won by Tonnerre Yaoundé of Cameroon, who beat Stella Club d'Adjamé of Ivory Coast 5-1 on aggregate in the final.

== First round ==
Team 1	Agg.	Team 2	1st leg	2nd leg
Al Ittihad El Iskandary (Egypt)	2-0	(Ethiopia) Saint George FC	2-0	0-0
Ifodje Atakpamé (Togo)	3-2	(Niger) Sahel SC	1-0	2-2
Mighty Jets Football Club (Nigeria)	2-2 (a)	(Cameroon) Tonnerre Yaoundé	2-2	0-0
Mufulira Wanderers (Zambia)	6-1	(Tanzania) JKU FC	3-0	3-1
Postel Sport (Benin)	1-3	(Central African Republic) AS Tempête Mocaf	0-1	1-3
Stella Club d'Adjamé (Ivory Coast)	2-0	(Liberia) Mighty Barolle	1-0	1-0
Wallidan F.C. (The Gambia)	0-2	(Senegal) ASC Jeanne d'Arc	0-0	0-2

Notes

- One team received a bye: Fortior Mahajanga (Madagascar)

== Quarterfinals ==
Team 1	Agg.	Team 2	1st leg	2nd leg
Al Ittihad El Iskandary (Egypt)	w/o	(Cameroon) Tonnerre Yaoundé	4-0	0-3^{1}
Ifodje Atakpamé (Togo)	0-5	(Ivory Coast) Stella Club d'Adjamé	0-1	0-4
ASC Jeanne d'Arc (Senegal)	4-2	(Central African Republic) AS Tempête Mocaf	1-1	3-1
Mufulira Wanderers (Zambia)	w/o	(Madagascar) Fortior Mahajanga	—	—

Notes

^{1}The match was abandoned in the second half with Tonnerre Yaoundé leading 3–0 after Al Ittihad players walked off to protest the officiating and the hostile home fans. Al Ittihad were ejected from the competition; after returning to Egypt, their players said that they were assaulted by local fans and police during the match after complaining about the poor officiating.

== Semifinals ==
Team 1	Agg.	Team 2	1st leg	2nd leg
ASC Jeanne d'Arc (Senegal)	3-4	(Ivory Coast) Stella Club d'Adjamé	2-2	1-2
Tonnerre Yaoundé (Cameroon)	3-2	(Zambia) Mufulira Wanderers	1-0	2-2

== Final ==
Team 1	Agg.	Team 2	1st leg	2nd leg
Stella Club d'Adjamé (Ivory Coast)	1-5	(Cameroon) Tonnerre Yaoundé	0-1	1-4

== Champion ==
African Cup Winners' Cup
1975 Winners

Tonnerre Yaoundé
First Title
