= Bitumastic FC =

Ugandan football club

- Full name: Bitumastic Football Club
- Ground: Muteesa II Stadium, Kampala
- Capacity: 20,200

Bitumastic Football Club, for short Bitumastic, is a Ugandan football club from Kampala. They play in the Second division of Ugandan football, the Ugandan Big League.

In 1967 the team won the second and the last edition of the unofficial competition of the Ugandan Super League. The official competition started on 1968.

== Stadium ==
Currently the team plays at the 20200 capacity Muteesa II Stadium.

== Honours ==
- Ugandan Super League (unofficial competition)

Champion (1): 1967

== Performance in CAF competitions ==
- African Cup of Champions Clubs: 1 appearance

1967 – Prelimanary Round
