= 2018–19 GFA League First Division =

GFA League First Division
- Season: 2018–19

The 2018–19 Gambian Premier League is the 50th season of the GFA League First Division, the top-tier football league in Gambia. The season started on 24 November 2018 and ended on 9 June 2019.

== Standings ==
Final table.

Pos	Team	Pld	W	D	L	GF	GA	GD	Pts	Qualification or relegation
1	Brikama United	26	12	10	4	27	15	+12	46	Champions
2	Real Banjul	26	12	9	5	29	12	+17	45	
3	Armed Forces	26	8	16	2	21	11	+10	40	
4	Fortune (Farato)	26	9	12	5	22	17	+5	39	
5	GAMTEL	26	9	9	8	27	25	+2	36	
6	Hawks	26	7	14	5	14	13	+1	35	
7	Marimoo (Manjai)	26	8	10	8	20	17	+3	34	
8	Gambia Ports Authority	26	8	10	8	17	14	+3	34	
9	Wallidan (Bakau)	26	8	10	8	22	24	−2	34	
10	Bakau Katchikally Milan (Bakau)	26	6	14	6	16	16	0	32	
11	Banjul United	26	4	14	8	13	19	−6	26	
12	Tallinding United	26	4	11	11	13	22	−9	23	
13	Samger (Kanifing)	26	3	13	10	13	23	−10	22	Relegated
14	PSV Wellingara	26	2	12	12	15	41	−26	18	Relegated

Source: rsssf.com
