= Alagie Sarr =

Gambian footballer

Personal information
- Date of birth: 14 December 1999 (age 26)
- Position: Midfielder

Senior career*
Years	Team	Apps	(Gls)
2012–2018	Gambia Ports Authority FC		

International career
2017	Gambia	2	(0)
- * Club domestic league appearances and goals

Alagie Sarr (born 14 December 1999) is a Gambian footballer who played as a midfielder for Gambia Ports Authority FC.
