= Serrekunda United FC =

Association football club in the Gambia

Serrekunda United
- Full name: Serrekunda United Football Club
- Nickname: Allay Boys
- Founded: 2008
- Ground: Various
- Chairman: Abdoulie Kanteh
- Manager: Alassan Jallow
- League: GFA League Third Division

Serrekunda United Football Club, simply SK United, is a football club from the town of Serrekunda in the West African state of Gambia. They currently play in the GFA League Third Division. they were promoted to the GFA League First Division for the 2015 season.
