= Pa Amadou Gai =

Gambian footballer

Daddy Gai
Personal information
- Full name: Pa Amadou Gai
- Date of birth: June 18, 1984 (age 42)
- Place of birth: Bakau, The Gambia
- Height: 6 ft 2 in (1.88 m)
- Position: Forward

Team information
- Current team: ASC HLM

Youth career
- 1997–2005: Bakau United

Senior career*
Years	Team	Apps	(Gls)
2005–2009	Bakau United	?	(9)
2009	Northwood	1	(0)
2009	Montreal Impact	7	(0)
2009–2010	Ron-Mango FC	4	(2)
2010–	ASC HLM	6	(1)

International career^{‡}
1999–2001	Gambia U-17	10	(4)
2002–2004	Gambia U-20	3	(0)
2008	Gambia U-23	2	(0)
2003–	Gambia	4	(0)
- * Club domestic league appearances and goals as of 7 June 2009 ‡ National team caps and goals as of 13 May 2009

Pa Amadou Gai (born June 18, 1984 in Bakau) is a Gambian football player who currently plays for ASC HLM,

== Career ==
=== Club ===
Gai, whose popular nickname is "Daddy", began his career in 1997 in the youth setup of his hometown team, Bakau United. He made his debut for the first team in 2005, and played in the Gambian Championnat National D1 for four seasons. He finished the 2007/2008 season as Bakau’s top scorer, and in 11 games in the 2008/2009, scored nine goals. After one game at Northwood in 2009, he returned to Gambia but left again on April 15, 2009, for a trial in Canada.

Gai signed a two-year with Montreal Impact in April 2009, and made his debut for the team on May 2, 2009, in a game against the Puerto Rico Islanders. He was released by the club on July 17, 2009 and signed for Ron-Mango FC of the Bakau Nawettan Championship. He left in 2010 Ron-Mango FC of the Gambian Old Jeshwang Nawettan Championship and joined to Senegal Premier League ASC HLM.

=== International ===
Gai has played for the Gambian U-17, U-20, U-23 and senior national teams. He made his first international appearance with Gambia in a friendly game against Nigeria in 2003.
