= Abiola Babes F.C. =

Nigerian football club

Abiola Babes
- Full name: Abiola Babes Football Club
- Founded: 1980; 46 years ago
- Dissolved: 2001
- Stadium: MKO Abiola Stadium
- Capacity: 23,325

Abiola Babes Football Club was a Nigerian football club that played in Abeokuta. It was owned by businessman Bashorun Moshood K Abiola. The team was promoted to the Nigeria First Division in 1984 and went on to be the FA Cup champions in 1985 and 1987.

After a period of hiatus in the 1990s, the team reformed in May 2000 but was disbanded the next year for lack of funds.

Their last game was in the 2001 Challenge Cup against NIPOST FC.

== Achievements ==
- Nigeria 2nd Division Champion

1983

- Nigerian FA Cup: 2

1985, 1987

== Performance in CAF competitions ==
- African Cup Winners' Cup: 2 appearances

1986: First Round
1987: Semifinals
