= Menmar Banjul United FC =

Association football club in Banjul, the Gambia

Menmar Banjul United
- Full name: Menmar Banjul United Football Club
- Founded: 2010
- Ground: Banjul Mini-Stadium
- Capacity: 3,000
- Chairman: Ebou Faye
- Manager: Sheikh Adama Joof
- League: GFA League Second Division
- 2024–25: 15th in GFA League First Division (relegated)
Home colours	Away colours

Menmar Banjul United Football Club is a professional football club from Banjul, Gambia. They played in the GFA League First Division during the 2010 season, which is the highest league in Gambian football. Th Their first major title was the 2014 GFF Cup.

== Achievements ==
- Gambian Cup: 1

2014
