= Augustinians FC =

Association football club in the Gambia

Augustinians
- Full name: Augustinians Football Club
- Founded: 1940
- Ground: Banjul Mini-Stadium
- Chairman: Sulayman Touray
- Manager: Ousman Darboe
- League: GFA League Third Division

Augustinians Football Club is a football club from Banjul in the West African state of Gambia. They play in the GFA League Third Division, which is the third league in Gambian football. The club was founded in 1940 and in 1966 won their first GFA League First Division.

== Honours ==
- GFA League First Division

Winners (3): 1966, 1967, 1987

== Performance in CAF competitions ==
- African Cup of Champions Clubs

1967 – Preliminary round
1968 – Preliminary round
