= Lifeline Expedition =

British advocacy group

- Formation: 1997
- Founder: David Pott
- Founded at: United Kingdom
- Purpose: Reconciliation response to Atlantic slave trade
- Official language: English
- Website: lifelineexpedition.co.uk/mota

Lifeline Expedition is a non-profit organization founded in 1997 by Briton David Pott. The group believes white people must apologize for the Atlantic slave trade, and that forgiveness can be granted by black people from areas that were involved in it.

It brings together teams of Africans, descendants of enslaved Africans and white people from the three former corners of the slave triangle and over a period of seven years has visited many significant slavery sites around the Atlantic world. Controversy has emerged over the fact that white people, including children, on the teams wore replica yokes and chains to express apology for the role of whites in the slave trade.

== The journeys ==
The first part of the journey was the Jubilee 2000 Lifeline Walk along the Greenwich meridian line in England. Journeys followed in France (2002), Spain and Portugal (2003), the United States (2004), the Caribbean region (2005) and West Africa (2006). The seven-year circuit of the Atlantic world concluded with the March of the Abolitionists, a National Project for the Bicentenary of the British Abolition of the Slave Trade Act in 2007.

The first journey to attract worldwide attention was the journey to the United States which began in Annapolis, Maryland, where Lifeline Expedition partnered with the Kunta Kinte-Alex Haley Foundation in a reconciliation march on 29 September 2004. The event was opposed by groups such as the National Alliance who counter demonstrated with placards reading "You are Entering a White Guilt Zone" and "White Pride".

In May 2006, the Lifeline Expedition team made an apology at the opening ceremony of the International Roots Festival in The Gambia. Apologies were given by English, French, German and American representatives as those nations were prominent in the slave trade in that region. The Vice-President of The Gambia, Dr Isatou Njie Saidy, accepted the apology and released the team from the yokes and chains. One of those giving the apology was Andrew Hawkins, a direct descendant of England's first slave trader, Sir John Hawkins.

The March of the Abolitionists in 2007 began in Hull, the birthplace of William Wilberforce, on 1 March. The walkers then walked 250 miles in yokes and chains, recalling the gruelling journeys of enslaved Africans, during the period of the Atlantic Slave Trade. Their penitential action took place in the season of Lent and, as well as expressing apology, also drew attention to the estimated 12 million people still in slavery today. The journey ended in Westminster on 24 March, when the team joined the Walk of Witness led by the Archbishops of Canterbury, York and the West Indies. The walkers were released from the yoke and chains by the Archbishop of the West Indies. The second part of the March of the Abolitionists (the Sankofa Reconciliation Walk) took place in June and July and visited all the major former slave ports.

== See also ==
- Political correctness
- Righteous indignation
- White guilt
