= Fortior Mahajanga =

Malagasy football club

- Full name: Fortior Club de la Côte Ouest
- Ground: Stade Rabemananjara; Mahajanga, Madagascar
- Capacity: 8.000

Fortior Club de la Côte Ouest known as Fortior Mahajanga or simply Fortior CO is a Malagasy football club based in Mahajanga.

== Achievements ==
- THB Champions League: 2

1972, 1979

- Coupe de Madagascar: 5

1974, 1975, 1976, 1977, 1985

== Performance in CAF competitions ==
- African Cup of Champions Clubs: 2 appearances

1973 – second round
1980 – second round

- African Cup Winners' Cup: 4 appearances

1975 – quarter-finals
1976 – preliminary round

1978 – first round
1987 – second round
