= Box Bar Stadium =

Stadium in Banjul, Gambia

Coordinates: 13°27′23″N 16°34′54″W

- Interactive map of Box Bar Stadium
- Full name: Box Bar Stadium
- Location: Banjul, Gambia
- Capacity: 3,000

Tenants
- Gambia national football team (1965–1983); Banjul United FC

Box Bar Stadium is a multi-use stadium in Banjul, Gambia. It is used mostly for football matches and was the home stadium for the Gambia national football team until Independence Stadium opened. It was also the home of the Gambian Cup.
