= Interior FC =

Association football club in the Gambia

Interior
- Full name: Interior Football Club
- Founded: 2002; 24 years ago
- Ground: Box Bar Mini Stadium
- Capacity: 2.000
- Manager: Ebrima Manneh
- League: GFA League Second Division
- 2015/16: 7th
Home colours	Away colours

The Interior is a football club from Serrekunda in the West African, state of Gambia, located near the capital of Banjul. They play in the GFA League Second Division, which is the highest league in Gambian football.

== History ==
In 2012, Interior beat Gambia Armed Forces FC 6–5 on a penalty shootout after a 1–1 draw at full time, advancing to the quarter-finals of the Gambian Cup.

== Stadium ==
The team plays at the 2,000 capacity Box Bar Mini Stadium.
