= Real de Banjul FC =

Association football club in the Gambia

Real de Banjul
- Full name: Real de Banjul Football Club
- Nickname: City Boys
- Founded: 1966; 60 years ago
- Ground: Banjul Mini Stadium
- Capacity: 3,000
- Chairman: Momodou Bah
- Manager: Vjatšeslav Zahovaiko
- League: GFA League First Division
- 2025–26: 6th of 16
- Website: www.realdebanjul.com
Home colours	Away colours

Real de Banjul Football Club is a Gambian professional association football club based in Banjul. The team compete in the GFA League First Division, the top flight of Gambian football league system. Real de Banjul is the most successful club in Gambian football history, having won a record 12 national titles

== History ==
Real de Banjul was founded in the 1966–67 season after a group of secondary schoolboys international team returned from a trip to Thiès in Senegal and named it as Benson and Hedges FC. The name was eventually changed by the then Director of Youth and Sports to Real de Bathurst FC and upon its registration with the Gambia Football Federation, it headquartered at 81 Lancaster Street, Banjul. The team witnessed another name change in 1970 changing to its present name of Real de Banjul which led to the expansion of the team having basketball, volleyball and athletics teams. The team then consisted of the youngest talented players in comparison to other local teams and won its first league title in 1971–72.

The first two cup titles were won in 1969 and 1970. Real de Banjul's cup final results in 1970 defeated White Phantoms 2–1, the club lost to Gambia Ports Authority in 1975 and later in 1980. Real lost to win their third title in 1993 after losing to Wallidan 2–1, they got their recent cup title in 1997 after defeating Hawks. The club lost to again to Wallidan in 2002 in their recent cup final appearance.

As champion winner, the club competed in the 2012 Gambian Super Cup and won their only title.

Their first continental appearance was in 1975 after winning their second title and withdrew from a match with Guinea's Hafia FC. Their first match was played a year later against Mali's Djoliba AC. After winning their fourth title, the club advanced in the second round and challenged Liberia's Saint Joseph Warriors where they scored their first goal and won their first match at the continentals for Real, later the club lost two legs to Ghana's Hearts of Oak. Real Banjul competed against the club from Guinea-Bissau further south Sporting Bissau and lost the second leg. The club competed in 1995 and defeated Cape Verde's CD Travadores, then the club faced Mbilnga from Gabon and the second match was abandoned at the 70th minute. Four years later in 1999, the club faced another Guinea's club AS Kaloum Star, the first leg won 0–2 while the second lost 4–1, in 2001, the club faced FC Derby from Mindelo, Cape Verde and defeated 1–0 in the second leg, then faced ASC Diaraf from Dakar in the neighboring Senegal up northwest and scored only a goal in the first match, as they scored nothing in the second match, they lost. As the 2007 national champion, Real Banjul withdrew in early December and did not participate in the 2008 CAF Champions League. Their next appearance was twelve years later in the 2013 season, the club challenged with FUS Rabat and won 2–1 and was out as the away team succeeded. Their recent appearance was the 2015 season and succeeded up to the first round.

== Uniform ==
Home uniform up to 2014

Its uniform color is red with a white right sash, sleeve and short edges for home games and the opposite being white with a red right sash, sleeve and short edges.

Its uniform color for home games was white with blue lining near its edges.

== Achievements ==
- GFA League First Division: 15

1972, 1974, 1975, 1978, 1983, 1994, 1997, 1998, 2000, 2007, 2012, 2014, 2023, 2024, 2025

- Gambian Cup: 3

1969, 1970, 1997.

- Gambian Super Cup: 3

2000, 2012, 2014.

== League and cup history ==
=== Performance in CAF competitions ===
Real Banjul's results in CAF competition
Season	Competition	Qualification method	Round	Opposition	Home	Away	Aggregate
1975	African Cup of Champions Clubs	Gambian champions	First round	(Guinea) Hafia FC	canc.	canc.	none (Note: Hafia withdrew)
1976	African Cup of Champions Clubs	Gambian champions	First round	(Mali) Djoliba AC	0–2	0–2	0–4
1979	African Cup of Champions Clubs	Gambian champions	Preliminary Round	(Liberia) Saint Joseph Warriors	1–0	0–0	1–0
1979	African Cup of Champions Clubs	Gambian champions	First round	(Ghana) Hearts of Oak	1–1	0–2	1–3
1984	African Cup of Champions Clubs	Gambian champions	First round	(Guinea-Bissau) SC Bissau	0–0	0–2	0–2
1995	African Cup of Champions Clubs	Gambian champions	First round	(Cape Verde) CD Travadores	1–0	0–0	1–0
1995	African Cup of Champions Clubs	Gambian champions	Second round	(Gabon) Mbilinga FC	0–2	0–4 (Note: Second match abandoned in the 70th minute)	0–6
1999	African Cup of Champions Clubs	Gambia champions	First round	(Guinea) AS Kaloum Star	0–2	1–1	1–3
2000	CAF Cup		First round	(Senegal) CSS Richard-Toll	0–1	0–1	0–2
2001	CAF Champions League	Gambian champions	Preliminary Round	(Cape Verde) FC Derby	0–0	1–0	1–0
2001	CAF Champions League	Gambian champions	First round	(Senegal) ASC Diaraf	1–1	0–1	1–2
2013	CAF Champions League	Gambian champions	Preliminary Round	(Morocco) FUS Rabat	2–1	0–1	2–2 (Note: Away goal rule)
2015	CAF Champions League	Gambian champions	Preliminary Round	(Liberia) Barrack Young Controllers	1–1	1–0	2–1
2015	CAF Champions League	Gambian champions	First round	(Algeria) ES Sétif	1–1	0–2	1–3
2025–26	CAF Champions League	Gambian champions	First Round	(Morocco) AS FAR	0–2	1–2	1–4

=== National level ===
Season	Div.	Pos.	Pl.	W	D	L	GS	GA	GD	P	Cup	Notes
2003–04	1	6	18	6	7	5	16	14	+2	25		
2005	1	6	18	6	5	7	13	18	-5	23		
2006	1	8	15	4	7	4	9	7	+2	19		
2007	1	1	18	10	5	3	15	6	+9	35		
2008	1	4	22	6	13	3	14	9	+5	31		
2009	1	8	22	7	8	7	17	20	-3	29		

== Statistics ==
- Best position: Second Round (continental)
- Best position at a cup competition: First Round (continental)
- Total matches played at the CAF Champions League: 22
  - Total matches played at home: 11
  - Total matches played away: 11
- Total matches played at the continental cup competitions: 2

== Managers ==
Name	Nationality	From	To
Bai Malleh Wadda	Gambia	1996	1998
Musa Njie	Gambia	2013	2014
Vasile Dobrău	Romania	2009	2010
Alhaji Amat Cham	Gambia	2013	2013
Alagie Sarr	Gambia	2013	2013
Franky van de Velde	Belgium	2013	2014
Mattar M'Boge	Gambia; England	2014	2015
Franky van de Velde	Belgium	2015	2016
Majorr Saine	Gambia	2016	2017
Musa Njie	Gambia	2017	2019
Ebou Jarra	Gambia	2019	2021
Vjatšeslav Zahovaiko	Estonia	2022	2023
