= Starlight Banjul =

Association football club in the Gambia

Starlight
- Full name: Starlight Banjul
- Founded: 2013
- Ground: Banjul Mini-Stadium
- Capacity: 3,000
- Chairman: Amadou Ceesay
- Manager: Ebrima Jouf
- League: GFA League Second Division

Starlight Banjul is a professional football from Banjul in the West African state of Gambia. They play in the GFA League Second Division, which is the second highest league in Gambian football.

== Stadium ==
Currently the team plays at the 3000 capacity Banjul Mini-Stadium.

== Honours ==
- GFA League First Division: 1980
