= Gambia Football Federation =

Governing body of association football in Gambia

CAF
- Short name: GFA
- Founded: 1952
- FIFA affiliation: 1968
- CAF affiliation: 1966
- President: Kemo Ceesay
- Website: https://gambiaff.org/

The Gambia Football Federation (GFF), formerly known as the Gambia Football Association, is the governing body of football in the Gambia. It was founded in 1952, and affiliated to FIFA in 1968 and to CAF in 1966. It organizes the GFA League First Division, the GFA League Second Division and the national team. The current president is Kemo Ceesay since August 2026.
