= Wallidan FC =

Association football club in the Gambia

Wallidan
- Full name: Wallidan Football Club
- Nickname: Blue Boys-si
- Founded: 1969; 57 years ago
- Ground: Independence Stadium
- Capacity: 20,000
- Chairman: Alieu Ceesay
- Manager: Foday Bah
- League: GFA League Second Division
Home colours	Away colours

Wallidan Football Club is a Gambian professional football club based in Banjul and Bakau. Since playing in the GFA League First Division, they are the most decorated team in the country's football history. They play at the Independence Stadium which has a capacity of 20,000.

== History ==
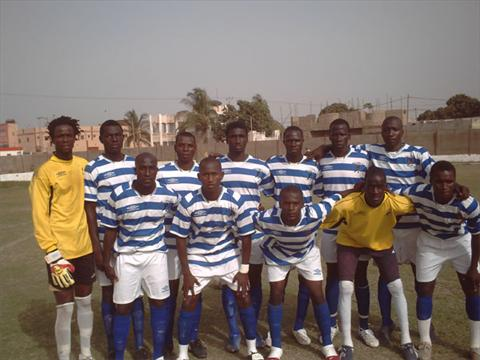
Wallidan's squad in August 2008

The club was founded after Gambian independence in 1965. Not long after, it became a registered club and played in the First Division. In 1970, the club won their first championship, then a second in 1971. Wallidan won two consecutive titles again in 1977. More titles were won in 1979, 1985, 1988, 1992 and 1995. Wallidan became the masters of the Gambian Cup since 1974, four consecutive cup titles were won in 1974, three consecutive titles were won in 1978, their eighth title was won in 1981, their ninth in 1984. In the 1987 edition, Wallidan defeated the Hawks 5–1 in the cup final. Wallidan defeated Peak Marwich in 1992 and Real de Banjul 2–1 in 1993. Walidan defeated Blackpool (a club known as Interior, based in Serrekunda East) 3–0, the last cup final match with Real de Banjul 1–0 in 2002. Wallidan won more cups in 2004, 2008 where they defeated Samger, and in 2015 after defeating GAMTEL Banjul 2–0.

=== At the continentals ===
Their first was the 1975 CAF Cup Winner's Cup where they lost to Dakar's ASC Jeanne d'Arc in the Senegambian derby. They returned in 1977 and lost to Espoirs Nouakchott. Wallidan's first championship appearance was in 1978 and advanced up to the first round. Their second championship was in 1980, loss to Upper Volta's Silures Bobo-Dioulasso. Wallidan appeared in the 1982 CAF Cup Winners' Cup and lost to Accra Hearts of Oak and then to Horoya AC in 1985. Wallidan made their third continental champ appearance and lost to Accra's Hearts of Oak in the 1986 edition. Wallidan made their greatest continental appearance heading to the quarterfinals. They defeated Mauritania's Amical Douane, then KAC Marrakech withdrew, then Real Republicans of Freetown, and lost to Bizertin. Wallidan missed the 1992 and the 1994 editions due to financial reasons. Their fourth championship appearance was in 1998, in the qualifying round. Their 8th continental cup appearance was in 2000. They lost to Benin's Mogas 90 FC. Wallidan showed up in the 2002 and defeated Horoya AC, then lost to Raja Casablanca. A year later, they defeated Dragons FC de l'Ouémé and in the first round lost to USM Alger. After winning their cup title in 2003, they appeared in 9th cup competition in 2004. The club lost to Club Africain of Tunisia under the away goals rule. In their 7th appearance in 2005, the club was playing against Ghana's Asante Kotoko. As Wallidan fielded an ineligible player, it was disqualified from the competition. Wallidan was to appear in the 2009 season to face Hearts of Oak, but withdrew due to financial concerns. In 2016, the club was to face MC Oran in the Confederation Cup, but again withdrew.

== Stadium ==
Independence Stadium, the home field of Wallidan

Independence Stadium is a multi-use stadium in Bakau west of the city centre of Banjul.

== Logo ==
Its logo has a blue coloured seal with a thick white rim in the outer part and a small one in the middle, inside are two white shrimps guarding the football, on top is the club name and on the bottom is the club's foundation year.

The older logo used up to the 2000s had a white seal with a thick red rim that is lighter on the bottom nearly to purple, along with its thick square inside, inside had a smaller circle with the letter "V" and the club name, first written in the Frenchified form of "Wallidane" and on the bottom "Gambian FC".

== Honours ==
- GFA League First Division: 16
  - 1970, 1971, 1976, 1977, 1979, 1981, 1982, 1985, 1988, 1992, 1995, 2001, 2002, 2004, 2005, 2008
- Gambian Cup: 24
  - 1971, 1972, 1973, 1974, 1976, 1977, 1978, 1981, 1984, 1986, 1987, 1988, 1992, 1993, 1994, 1998, 1999, 2001, 2002, 2003, 2004, 2008, 2015, 2022
- Gambian Super Cup: 4
  - 1999, 2001, 2002, 2003

== Performance in CAF competitions ==
Season	Competition	Qualification method	Round	Opposition	Home	Away	Aggregate
1975	CAF Cup Winners' Cup	Gambian Cup winners	First round	(Senegal) ASC Jeanne d'Arc	0–0	2–0	0–2
1977	CAF Cup Winners' Cup	Gambian Cup winners	First round	(Mauritania) Espoirs Nouakchott	1–1	0–0	0–0 (a)
1978	African Cup of Champions Clubs	Gambian champions	Preliminary Round	(Mauritania) ASC Garde Nationale	2–2	1–3	5–3
1978	African Cup of Champions Clubs	Gambian champions	First round	(Cameroon) Canon Yaoundé	1–2	1–0	2–2 (a)
1979	CAF Cup Winners' Cup	Gambian Cup winners	Second round	(Mauritania) Espoirs Nouakchott	1–0	1–0	1–1 (5–4 p)
1980	African Cup of Champions Clubs	Gambian champions	First round	(Republic of Upper Volta) Silures Bobo-Dioulasso	1–1	0–1	1–2
1982	CAF Cup Winners' Cup	Gambian Cup winners	First round	(Ghana) Hearts of Oak	1–0	4–1	2–4
1985	CAF Cup Winners' Cup	Gambian Cup winners	First round	(Guinea) Horoya AC	1–0	2–0	1–2
1986	African Cup of Champions Clubs	Gambian champions	First round	(Ghana) Hearts of Oak	1–0	2–0	1–2
1988	CAF Cup Winners' Cup	Gambian Cup winners	First round	(Mauritania) AS Amical Douane	3–0	w/o	3–0^{1}
1988	CAF Cup Winners' Cup	Gambian Cup winners	Second round	(Morocco) KAC Marrakech	canc.	canc.	w/o^{2}
1988	CAF Cup Winners' Cup	Gambian Cup winners	Round of 8	(Sierra Leone) Real Republicans	1–0	0–0	1–0
1988	CAF Cup Winners' Cup	Gambian Cup winners	Quarter-finals	(Tunisia) CA Bizertin	canc,	canc.	w/o^{3}
1995	CAF Cup Winners' Cup	Gambian Cup winners	First round	(Morocco) KAC Marrakech	canc.	canc.	w/o^{2}
1995	CAF Cup Winners' Cup	Gambian Cup winners	Second round	(Tunisia) AS Marsa	canc.	canc.	w/o^{3}
1998	CAF Champions League	Gambian champions	Qualifying Round	(Senegal) AS Douanes (Dakar)	0–0	0–2	0–2
2000	CAF Cup Winners' Cup	Gambian Cup winners	First round	(Benin) Mogas 90 FC	0–1	2–0	0–3
2002	CAF Champions League	Gambian champions	Preliminary Round	(Guinea) Horoya AC	3–0	1–1	4–1
2002	CAF Champions League	Gambian champions	First round	(Morocco) Raja Casablanca	1–3	1–2	3–4
2003	CAF Champions League	Gambian champions	Preliminary Round	(Benin) Dragons FC de l'Ouémé	1–0	0–0	1–0
2003	CAF Champions League	Gambian champions	First round	(Algeria) USM Alger	2–1	2–0	2–3
2004	CAF Confederation Cup	Gambian Cup winners	First round	(Tunisia) Club Africain	1–1	0–0	1–1 (a)
2005	CAF Champions League	Gambian champions	First round	(Ghana) Asante Kotoko	canc.	canc.	w/o^{4}
2006	CAF Champions League	Gambian champions	First round	(Ghana) Hearts of Oak	canc.	canc.	w/o^{3}
2009	CAF Champions League	Gambian champions	First round	(Morocco) Ittihad Khemisset	canc.	canc.	w/o^{3}
2016	CAF Confederation Cup	Gambian Cup winners	First round	(Algeria) MC Oran	canc.	canc.	w/o^{3}

^{1} The match in Mauritania was not played as Amical Douane withdrew
^{2} KAC Marrakech abandoned the tournament
^{3} Wallidan abandoned the tournament
^{4} Wallidan was disqualified by the Gambian Football Federation

== National level ==
Season	Div.	Pos.	Pl.	W	D	L	GS	GA	GD	P	Cup	Notes
2003–04	1	1	18	11	5	2	27	11	+16	38	Winner	
2005	1	1	18	6	11	1	19	11	+8	29	Finalist	
2006	1	5	16	7	3	6	14	13	+1	24		
2007	1	3	18	9	5	4	16	12	+4	32		
2008	1	1	22	10	9	3	25	15	+10	39	Winner	
2009	1	3	22	8	9	5	20	16	+4	33		
2012	1	12	-	-	-	-	-	-	-	-		
2014–15	1	9	-	-	-	-	-	-	-	-	Winner	
2016–17	1	4	-	-	-	-	-	-	-	-		
