= Independence Stadium (Gambia) =

Stadium in Bakau, Gambia

- Interactive map of Independence Stadium
- Location: Bakau, Gambia
- Coordinates: 13°28′7.7″N 16°40′40.1″W
- Owner: Government of the Gambia
- Operator: Ministry of Youth and Sports
- Capacity: 20,000
- Surface: GrassMaster"
- Record attendance: 45,000 (Gambia vs Algeria, 8 September 2018)
- Field size: 105 m × 68 m

Construction
- Opened: 1984
- Renovated: 2011, 2022–present

Tenants
- Gambia national football team (1984–present); Wallidan FC

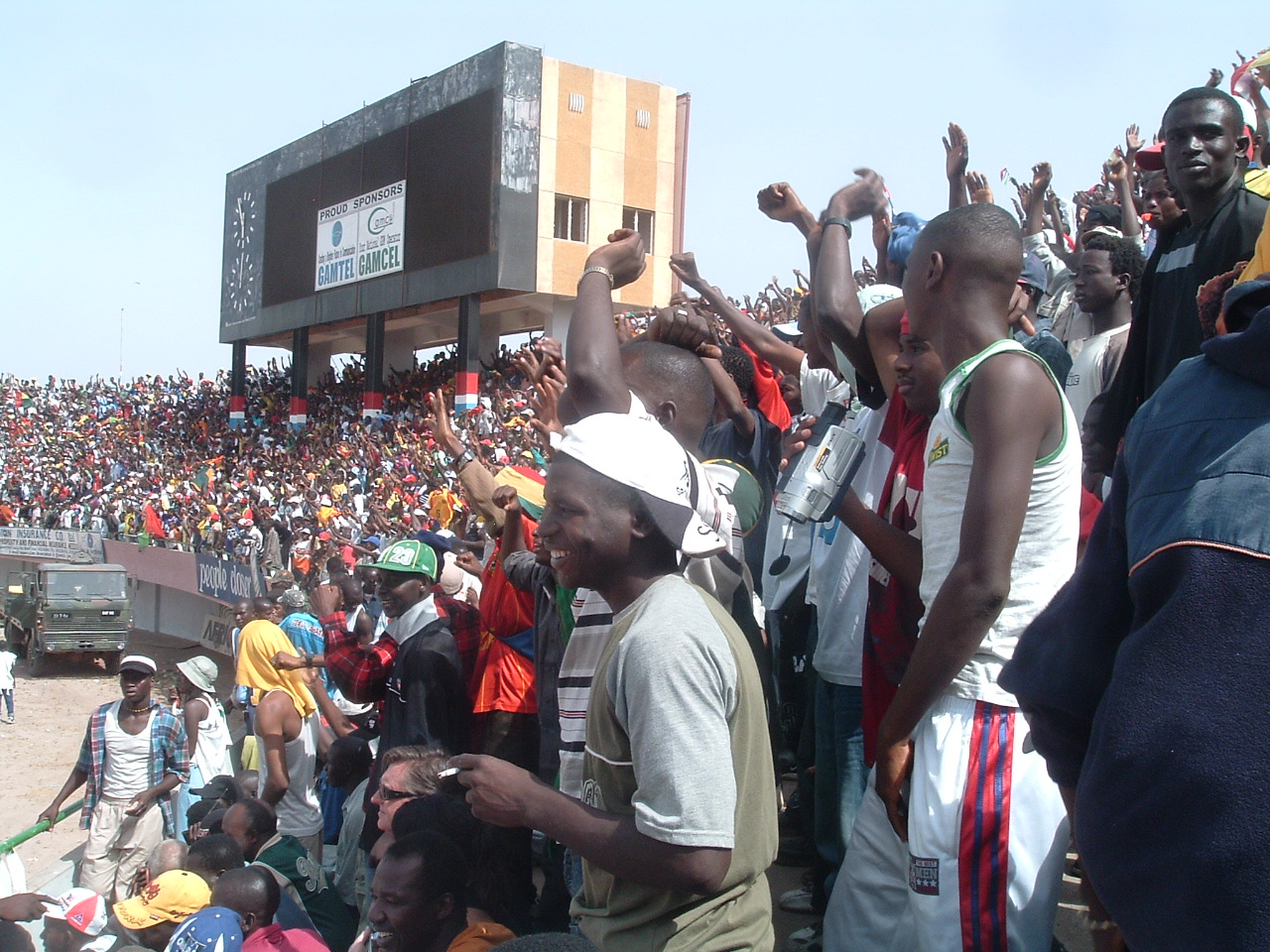
Football fans watching Gambia v Guinea

Independence Stadium is a multi-purpose stadium in Bakau, Gambia. It is currently used mostly for football matches, also for athletics, concerts and various public events. The stadium holds 20,000 people.

== History ==
Independence Stadium was constructed in 1984 by the People's Republic of China for The Gambia as part of their stadium diplomacy policy. Due to a history of poor management, a new stadium board was introduced in 2011. In 2019, the Confederation of African Football (CAF) warned Gambia that Independence Stadium did not meet their stadium criteria. The government provided some money for renovations but it was insufficient. In 2022, it was banned from playing international matches due to the lack of an electronic scoreboard, fixed seating, poor quality pitch and medical facilities as well as inadequate dugouts. In 2025, temporary approval for Independence Stadium was granted.

== Notable events ==
=== 10th anniversary of the July 22nd revolution ===
On 22 July 2004, heads of state and dignitaries from several African nations, and the Taiwanese prime minister attended a large parade to mark the tenth anniversary of the assumption to power of President Jammeh. On 18 February 2017 the 52nd Independence Anniversary Celebrations, and inauguration of Adama Barrow as President of the Republic of The Gambia, was held at the Independence Stadium Bakau, Gambia.

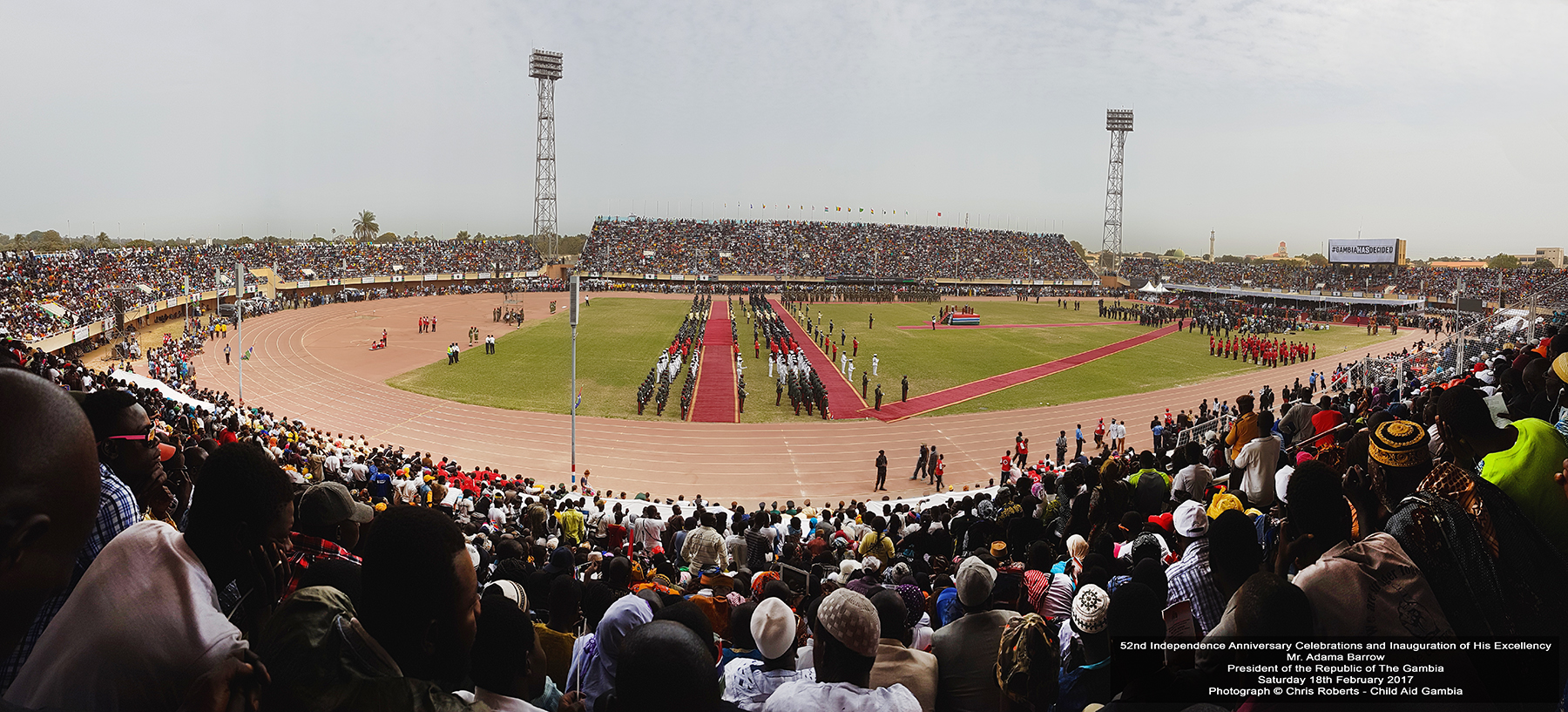
52nd Independence Anniversary Celebrations and Inauguration of Adama Barrow as President of the Republic of The Gambia

=== Lifeline Expedition ===
In June 2006, Andrew Hawkins (a descendant of England's first slave trader Sir John Hawkins) and 20 friends from the Christian charity Lifeline Expedition knelt in chains before 25,000 Africans to ask forgiveness for his ancestor's involvement in the slave trade. The Vice President Isatou Njie Saidy symbolically removed the chains in a spirit of reconciliation and forgiveness.

== See also ==
- Box Bar Stadium (Banjul)
