= Gambia Ports Authority =

Government agency of the Gambia

The Gambia Ports Authority (GPA) is a government agency responsible for the governance and maintenance of the ports and port facilities of the Gambia, principally that of the Port of Banjul on the Gambia River. The GPA was founded in 1972 and it is a member of the Port Management Association of West and Central Africa. Ports Authority offices are in Banjul.

Principal facilities include the Banjul Wharf and the New Banjul Jetty and Extension; a container terminal, freight terminal, bonded warehouse complex, oil boom, workshops and a document handling centre. Expansion plans include jetty expansion; a new ferry terminal and head office building; new computer cabling and a new car and truck terminal area.

The Ports Authority sponsors Gambia Ports Authority F.C., a Banjul-based football team of the Gambian Championnat National D1.

== See also ==
- Harbor
- Port operator
- Port authority
- Transport in the Gambia
