= Gambian Cup =

Association football tournament in the Gambia

- Founded: 1965
- Region: Gambia
- Current champions: Greater Tomorrow (1st title)
- Most championships: Wallidan (24 titles)
- 2026 Gambian Cup

The Gambian Cup is the top knockout tournament of the Gambian football. The current champion is Real Banjul who won their four title in 2019. The winner competes in the Gambian Super Cup and also qualifies into the CAF Confederation Cup each season, if the national league champion also wins the FA cup then the second placed cup club competes.

Wallidan FC has won the most titles, 24.

== Winners ==
=== Before independence ===
- 1952: Gambia United 2–1 Augustinians FC
- 1954: Police
- 1955: UAC
- 1956: White Phantoms
- 1957: Rainbow
- 1958: White Phantoms
- 1959: Black Diamonds
- 1960: White Phantoms
- 1961: White Phantoms
- 1962: Augustinians
- 1963: White Phantoms
- 1964: White Phantoms
- 1965: not played

=== Since independence ===
- 1966: Arrance
- 1967: Arrance
- 1968: Augustinians
- 1969: Real de Banjul 2-1 Young Lions
- 1970: Real de Banjul 2–1 White Phantoms
- 1971: Wallidan (Banjul)
- 1972: Wallidan (Banjul)
- 1973: Wallidan (Banjul)
- 1974: Wallidan (Banjul)
- 1975: Ports Authority (Banjul) vs Real Banjul
- 1976: Wallidan (Banjul)
- 1977: Wallidan (Banjul)
- 1978: Wallidan (Banjul)
- 1979: Dingareh
- 1980: Ports Authority vs Real Banjul
- 1981: Wallidan (Banjul)
- 1982: Starlight Banjul
- 1983: Hawks (Banjul)
- 1984: Wallidan (Banjul)
- 1985: Starlight Banjul
- 1986: Wallidan (Banjul)
- 1987: Wallidan (Banjul) 5–1 Hawks
- 1988: Wallidan (Banjul)
- 1989: not played
- 1990: not played
- 1991: not played
- 1992: Wallidan (Banjul) bt Peak Marwich
- 1993: Wallidan (Banjul) 2–1 Real de Banjul
- 1994: Wallidan
- 1995: Mass Sosseh bt Steve Biko
- 1996: Hawks
- 1997: Real de Banjul 1–0 Hawks (Banjul)
- 1998: Wallidan (Banjul) 1–1 1–1 Gambia Ports Authority (Banjul) (aet, 4–3 pen)
- 1999: Wallidan (Banjul) 1–1 Mass Sosseh (aet, 4–3 pen)
- 2000: Steve Biko (Bakau) 1–1 Wallidan (Banjul) (aet, 4–2 pen)
- 2001: Wallidan (Banjul) 3–0 Blackpool (Serrekunda East)
- 2002: Wallidan (Banjul) 1–0 Real de Banjul
- 2003: Wallidan (Banjul) 1–0 Hawks (Banjul)
- 2004: Wallidan (Banjul) 1–1 Armed Forces (Banjul) (aet, 9–8 pen)
- 2005: Bakau United 4–1 Wallidan (Banjul) (aet)
- 2006: Hawks (Banjul) 3–0 Steve Biko FC (Bakau)
- 2007: Ports Authority (Banjul) 1–0 Hawks (Banjul)
- 2008: Wallidan (Banjul) 2–2 Samger (4–2 pen)
- 2009: Young Africans (Banjul) 0–0 GAMTEL (Banjul) (3–1 pen)
- 2010: GAMTEL (Banjul) 3–0 Hawks (Banjul)
- 2011: GAMTEL (Banjul) 2–0 Ports Authority (Banjul)
- 2012: GAMTEL (Banjul) 3–0 Interior FC (Serrekunda)
- 2013: GAMTEL (Banjul) 1–1 Seaview (3–1 pen)
- 2014: Banjul United (Banjul) 1–0 Hawks (Banjul)
- 2015: Wallidan (Banjul) 2–0 GAMTEL
- 2016: Brikama United (Brikama) 1-0 Bombada
- 2017: Hawks (Banjul) 1–1 Real de Banjul (7–6 pen)
- 2018: Armed Forces (Banjul) 4–3 Brikama United
- 2019: Real de Banjul (Banjul) 1–0 Red Hawks
- 2020: Not played due to COVID-19 pandemic
- 2021: Not played due to COVID-19 pandemic
- 2022: Wallidan (Banjul) 0–0 Brikama United (4–2 pen)
- 2023: Not played
- 2024: Medina United 0–0 TMT (3–2 pen)
- 2025: Greater Tomorrow 0–0 TMT (3–2 pen)

== Performance by club ==
Only cups after independence are counted.

Club	City	Titles (known)	Last title
Wallidan	Banjul	24	2022
Hawks	Banjul	4	2017
Real de Banjul	Banjul	4	2019
GAMTEL Football Club	Banjul	4	2013
Gambia Ports Authority	Banjul	3	2007
Arrance (now Adonis)	Banjul	2	1967
Starlight Banjul	Banjul	2	1985
Augustinians	Banjul	1	1968
Bakau United	Bakau	1	2005
Banjul United	Banjul	1	2014
Dingareh	Banjul	1	1979
Mass Sosseh	Banjul	1	1995
Steve Biko	Bakau	1	2000
Young Africans	Banjul	1	2009
Brikama United	Brikama	1	2016
Armed Forces	Banjul	1	2018
Medina United	Serekunda	1	2024
Greater Tomorrow	Brikama	1	2025
