= Bombada FC =

Association football club in the Gambia

Bombada United
- Full name: Bombada United
- Ground: Serrekunda East Mini-Stadium
- Manager: Lamin Antony Cesay
- League: GFA League First Division
- 2025–26: 4th

Bombada United is a football club from Brikama in the West African state of Gambia. They currently play in the top domestic GFA League First Division since promoting to the league for the 2015 season.
