= Gambia Ports Authority FC =

Association football club in the Gambia

GPA
- Full name: Gambia Ports Authority Football Club
- Nickname: The Ferry Boys
- Founded: 1973
- Ground: Serrekunda East mini-stadium
- Chairman: Mass Axi Gai
- Manager: Njuga Ngiran
- League: GFA League First Division
- 2025–26: First Division, 3rd
Home colours	Away colours

Gambia Ports Authority Football Club is a Gambian professional football club based in Banjul and sponsored by the Gambia Ports Authority. They play in the top division in Gambian football, the GFA League First Division.

== History ==
The Gambia Ports Authority was established in 1973 and the core of their players were snatched from Real de Banjul. It became one of the best clubs in the country with players like Goalkeeper Saho, Alhaji Sarr, Kabba Ceesay, to name a few.

The GPA won their first cup title in 1975 and appeared in the first edition of the African Cup Winners' Cup in 1976, challenging RS Kadiogo. In 1983, they lost to Dakar's ASC Diaraf. In the 1985 African Cup of Champions Clubs, the club advanced as a walkover as USFA Ouagadougou of Burkina Faso withdrew. After advancing into the first round, the club lost to Morocco's FAR Rabat 8–0 and made their worst defeat at the continentals.

In 1989, the club ceased to exist and in its place came Waterside FC, which was the feeder team. In 1996, Falcons FC, which won the Banjul Nawetaan, was transformed to GPA FC. The team gained promotion from the 3rd division while coached by Ebou Faye, who also doubled up as player. He scored a brace of goals that secured the promotion. He coached the team until it was on the threshold of gaining promotion, and Kabba Ceesay took over. After two seasons, Modou Lamin Fofana Faraba, the caretaker coach, took over. He won the championship in 1999 season and FTI trophy.

In 2001, Demba Ramata took over for a season before Ebou Faye took over again for three seasons. Alhaji Sarr, took over in 2005 season and this period could be described as the golden period of the club as they won the league in his first year. They followed this with the Super Cup and FA Cup in his second season. Following their league win, the headed to the 2007 CAF Champions League and made their first continental win in a match against Ghana's Asante Kotoko, they headed to the first round and faced Nasarawa United from Nigeria, they made their recent continental win in the home match 2–1, they lost the away match 3–0 and were kicked out from further competition. On 4 December 2007, he left and Lukeh became coach until May 19, 2008, when he was sacked by the GFA and in July, Malamin Fofana became coach for the Ports Authority FC. Later in July, the GPA finished 11th place and was relegated from the First Division, they participated in the Second Division for 2009 and later returned into the GFA League First Division once more.

The GPA won their league title in 2010 and yet again headed to the continentals a year later, the 2011 CAF Champions League, they challenged ASC Diaraf for the second time out of the neighbouring Senegal, they lost the home match 0–2, they made their only draw numbering a goal, it was also GPA's last continental match. In the mid-2010s, Njunga Ngiram became coach of the Ports Authority team. In 2016, the GPA headed to win the league title.

== Honours ==
- Gambian Championnat National D1: 6

1984, 1986, 1999, 2006, 2010, 2016

- Gambian Cup: 3

1975, 1980, 2007

- Gambian Super Cup: 3

2006, 2007, 2016

== Performance in CAF competitions ==
Season	Competition	Qualification method	Round	Opposition	Home	Away	Aggregate
1976	CAF Cup Winners' Cup	Gambian Cup winners	First round	(Republic of Upper Volta) RS Kadiogo	1–4	2–1	2–6
1983	African Cup of Champions Clubs		Preliminary Round	(Senegal) ASC Diaraf	0–2	4–0	0–6
1985	African Cup of Champions Clubs	Gambian champions	Preliminary Round	(Burkina Faso) USFA Ouagadougou			w/o^{1}
1985	African Cup of Champions Clubs	Gambian champions	First round	(Morocco) FAR Rabat	w/o^{2}	8–0	0–8
1991	CAF Cup Winners' Cup		First round				dq^{3}
2007	CAF Champions League	Gambian champions	Preliminary Round	(Ghana) Asante Kotoko	1–0	1–0	1–1 (4–2 p)
2007	CAF Champions League	Gambian champions	First round	(Nigeria) Nasarawa United	2–1	3–0	4–2
2008	CAF Confederation Cup	Gambian Cup winners	First round	(Ivory Coast) ES Bingerville	0–1	3–0	0–4
2011	CAF Champions League	Gambian champions	Qualifying round	(Senegal) ASC Diaraf	0–2	1–1	1–3

^{1}USFA Ouadagoudou withdrew
^{2}The Ports Authority withdrew before playing the second leg
^{3}The Ports Authority were disqualified in the first round

== National level ==
Season	Div.	Pos.	Pl.	W	D	L	GS	GA	GD	P	Cup	Notes
2003–04	1	3	18	9	4	5	26	12	+14	31		
2005	1	5	18	5	9	4	15	10	+5	24		
2006	1	1	17	10	3	4	14	6	+8	33		
2007	1	4	18	8	7	3	18	10	+8	31	Winner	
2008	1	11	22	2	14	6	10	15	-5	20		Relegated to the GFA League Second Division

== Coaches ==
Name	Nationality	From	To
Demba Ramata	Gambia	2001	2002
Ebou Faye		2002	2006
Alhagi Sarr	Gambia	2006	4 December 2007
Ebrima Cham Joof	Gambia	4 December 2007	9 May 2008
Malamin Fofana]	Gambia	9 May 2008	2010
Njuga Ngiran	Gambia	2015	
