= Bakau United FC =

Association football club in the Gambia

Bakau United
- Full name: Bakau United Football Club
- Founded: 1996
- Ground: Serrekunda East mini-stadium
- Capacity: 5,000
- Chairman: Edrissa Sowe
- Manager: Modou Sanyang
- League: GFA League First Division
Home colours	Away colours

The Bakau United Football Club is a football club from Bakau, Gambia, located near the capital of Banjul. They play in the GFA League First Division, which is the highest league in Gambian football.

They won the Gambian Cup in 2005. The club plays at the 5,000 capacity Serrekunda East mini-stadium.

== Achievements ==
- Gambian Cup: 1

2005

- Gambian Super Cup: 1

2005
