= Hawks FC =

Association football club in the Gambia

Hawks
- Full name: Hawks Football Club
- Nickname: The Red Boys
- Founded: 1973; 53 years ago
- Ground: Various
- Chairman: James F. P. Gomez
- Manager: Alieu Jagne
- League: GFA League First Division
- 2025–26: First Division, 13th
Home colours	Away colours

Hawks Football Club is a Gambian professional football club based in Banjul. The senior team plays in the top division; the second team, Red Hawks FC, plays in the second division; the third team, Young Hawks, plays in the third division.

== History ==
Hawks Football Club, founded in 1973 by Housainou M. M. Njai, was founded as an amateur club. Hawks FC first played the top division in 1975, but was relegated in 1978, only to return to the first division in 1979. Over the years, Hawks FC has embarked on promoting various youth development, educational and football programmes for boys and girls. As a result of this, the club has its own academy for children aged between 5 and 15, two juniors and a senior team.

== Performances in CAF competitions ==
- CAF Confederation Cup

1984 – First round

- CAF Confederation Cup

2007 – First round

- CAF Confederation Cup

2016 – First round

- CAF Confederation Cup

2018 – First round

== League and cup history ==
Season	Div.	Pos.	Pl.	W	D	L	GS	GA	GD	P	Cup	Notes
2003–04	1	2	18	11	2	5	32	17	+15	35		
2005	1	3	18	8	5	5	18	13	+5	29		
2006	1	6	15	5	7	3	16	8	+8	22	Winner	
2007	1	5	18	6	5	7	19	16	+8	23	Finalist	
2008	1	3	22	9	9	4	22	16	+6	36		
2009	1	5	22	8	7	7	17	13	+4	31		
2012	1	7	-	-	-	-	-	-	-	-	Quarterfinals	
2014–15	1	7	-	-	-	-	-	-	-	-		

== Honours ==
- GFA League First Division: 3

1992–93, 1995–96, 2021–22

- Gambian Cup: 4

1982–83, 1995–96, 2005–06, 2017

- Gambian Super Cup: 1

2017
