= Brikama United FC =

Association football club in the Gambia

- Full name: Brikama United Football Club
- Nickname: Sateyba Boys
- Founded: 2003
- Ground: Box Bar Mini Stadium
- Capacity: 3,000
- Chairman: Bubacarr Bajo
- Manager: Modou Laminate Nyassi
- League: GFA League First Division
- 2025–26: 5th
Home colours	Away colours

Brikama United Football Club is a Gambian football club located in Brikama, Gambia. It is a community football club which is owned and run by BYSA (Brikama Youth and Sports Association). It currently plays in GFA League First Division. It is the first club outside Banjul, the capital city, to win the GFA First Division title since the league's inception in 1969.

Brikama United FC plays its home matches at the Brikama Mini Stadium commonly and locally known as 'Box Bar'. It is the first artificial turf in the Gambia.

== Titles ==
- GFA League First Division
  - Champions (2): 2011, 2019
- Gambian Cup: 1
  - Winners (1): 2016
- Gambian Super Cup: 0

== Performance in CAF competitions ==
- CAF Champions League: 2 appearances

2012 – First Round
2020 – Preliminary Round
