= Samger FC =

Association football club in the Gambia

- Full name: Samger Football Club
- Nickname: The Academy Boys
- Founded: 2003
- Ground: Serrekunda East Mini Stadium
- Capacity: 5,000
- Owner: Cherno Samba
- Manager: Alhagii Bassiru
- League: Second Division
- 2023–24: 16th First Division (relegated)
Home colours

Samger Football Club is a Gambian football club based in Kanifing near Serrekunda. They play in the top division in Gambian football, the Gambian Championnat National D1.

== Stadium ==
Currently the team plays at the 5,000 capacity Serrekunda East Mini-Stadium.

== League participations ==
- Gambian Championnat National D1: 2006–2016, 2018-
- Gambian Second Division: 2004–2006, 2017

== Achievements ==
- Gambian Super Cup
  - Winners (1): 2008
