= GFF League First Division =

Gambian association football league

First Division
- Founded: 1965
- Country: Gambia
- Confederation: CAF
- Number of clubs: 16
- Level on pyramid: 1
- Relegation to: GFA League Second Division
- Domestic cup: Gambian Cup
- International cup(s): Champions League; Confederation Cup
- Current champions: Medina United (1st title) (2025–26)
- Most championships: Wallidan (16 titles)
- Top scorer: Mustapha Drammeh

The GFF League First Division, also GFF 1st Division League, is the highest division of football in Gambia. The league was incorporated in 1965.

== Previous champions ==
Years	Champions
1965–66	Augustinians (1)
1966–67	Augustinians (2)
1967–68	Adonis (1)
1968–69	White Phantoms (1)
1969–70	Wallidan (1)
1970–71	Wallidan (2)
1971–72	Real Banjul (1)
1972–73	Adonis (2)
1973–74	Real Banjul (2)
1974–75	Real Banjul (3)
1975–76	Wallidan (3)
1976–77	Wallidan (4)
1977–78	Real Banjul (4)
1978–79	Wallidan (5)
1979–80	Starlight Banjul (1)
1980–81	Wallidan (6)
1981–82	Wallidan (7)
1982–83	Real Banjul (5)
1983–84	Gambia Ports Authority (1)
1984–85	Wallidan (8)
1985–86	Gambia Ports Authority (2)
1986–87	Augustinians (3)
1987–88	Wallidan (9)
1988–89	Not finished
1989–90	Not held
1990–91	Not finished
1991–92	Wallidan (10)
1992–93	Hawks (1)
1993–94	Real Banjul (6)
1994–95	Wallidan (11)
1995–96	Hawks (2)
1996–97	Real Banjul (7)
1997–98	Real Banjul (8)
1998–99	Gambia Ports Authority (3)
1999–2000	Real Banjul (9)
2000–01	Wallidan (12)
2001–02	Wallidan (13)
2002–03	Armed Forces (1)
2003–04	Wallidan (14)
2005	Wallidan (15)
2006	Gambia Ports Authority (4)
2007	Real Banjul (10)
2008	Wallidan (16)
2009	Armed Forces (2)
2010	Gambia Ports Authority (5)
2011	Brikama United (1)
2012	Real Banjul (11)
2013	Steve Biko (1)
2014	Real Banjul (12)
2014–15	Gamtel (1)
2015–16	Gambia Ports Authority (6)
2016–17	Armed Forces (3)
2017–18	Gamtel (2)
2018–19	Brikama United (2)
2019–20	(Canceled due to COVID-19)
2020–21	Fortune (1)
2021–22	Hawks (3)
2022–23	Real Banjul (13)
2023–24	Real Banjul (14)
2024–25	Real Banjul (15)
2025–26	Medina United (1)

== Performance by club ==
Club	City	Titles	Last title
Wallidan	Banjul	16	2008
Real de Banjul	Banjul	15	2024–25
GPA FC	Banjul	6	2015–16
Augustinians	Banjul	3	1986–87
GAF FC	Banjul	3	2016–17
Hawks	Banjul	3	2021–22
Adonis	Bathurst	2	1972–73
Brikama United	Brikama	2	2018–19
GAMTEL FC	Banjul	2	2017–18
White Phantoms	Bathurst	1	1968–69
Starlight Banjul	Banjul	1	1979–80
Steve Biko	Bakau	1	2013
Fortune FC	Farato	1	2020–21
Medina United		1	2025–26

== Top goalscorers ==
Year	Player	Club	Goals
2001–02	(The Gambia) Pa Amadou Gai		
2003–04	(The Gambia) Demba Savage	Gambia Ports Authority	12
2008–09	(The Gambia) Pa Amadou Gai	Bakau United	9
2012	(The Gambia) Modou Njie-Sarr	Real de Banjul	15
2016–17	(The Gambia) Mustapha Drammeh	Brikama United	15
2020–21	(The Gambia) Saikou Ceesay	Armed Forces	13
2021–22	(The Gambia) Osman Ceesay	Falcons	11
2022–23	(The Gambia) Mustapha Drammeh	Brikama United	20

=== Multiple hat-tricks ===
Rank	Country	Player	Hat-tricks
1	(The Gambia)	Ebrima Camara	1
1	(The Gambia)	Kabba Jobe	1
