= Steve Biko FC =

Association football club in Bakau, the Gambia

- Full name: Steve Biko Football Club
- Nickname: The Bakau Giants Killers
- Founded: 1978
- Ground: Serrekunda East Mini-Stadium, Serrekunda
- Capacity: 5,000
- Chairman: Mustapha Kebbeh
- Manager: Abdoulie Bojang
- League: GFA League
- 2024–25: 8th
Home colours	Away colours

Steve Biko Football Club is a football club from Bakau in the West African country of the Gambia, located near the capital of Banjul. They play in the GFA League First Division, the top flight of Gambian football. They won the GFA Cup in 2000. While the club qualified for the 2002 CAF Cup, they declined to participate.

The club was named in honor of the murdered South African civil rights activist Steve Biko, who was killed by the Apartheid regime. Founded in 1978, the club initially began playing in the third division. They climbed the ranks of the league to achieve second place in 1983. In 1989, they played for the first time in the top division.

== Achievements ==
- Gambian Championnat National D1: 1

2013.

- Gambian Cup: 1

2000.

== Current players ==
Note: Flags indicate national team as defined under FIFA eligibility rules; some limited exceptions apply. Players may hold more than one non-FIFA nationality.

No.	Pos.	Nation	Player
—	GK	GAM	Musa Touray
—	GK	GAM	Ousman Badjie
—	DF	GAM	Saikou Conteh
—	DF	GAM	Essa Sedibeh
—	DF	GAM	Modou Fedo Jallow
—	DF	GAM	Kebba Marong
—	MF	GAM	Demba Sanyang

No.	Pos.	Nation	Player
—	MF	GAM	Habib Kunta
—	MF	GAM	Saikou O Joof
—	MF	GAM	Fabakary Bojang
—	MF	GAM	Saikou Sedibeh
—	FW	GAM	Alasan Camara
—	FW	GAM	Baboucarr Jatta
—	FW	GAM	Saliff Papa Badjie

== Managers ==
- 1999–2000 – (Senegal) Jules Bocandé
- (The Gambia) Abdoulie Bojang
