= Gamtel FC =

Association football club in the Gambia

Gamtel Tigers
- Full name: Gamtel Tigers Football Club
- Ground: Serrekunda East Mini-Stadium
- Capacity: 6,000
- Chairman: Emma Hayes
- Manager: Ebrima Touray
- League: Gambian Championnat National D1
Home colours	Away colours

Gamtel Football Club was a Gambian professional football club based in Banjul and sponsored by Gamtel. They last played in the top division in Gambian football, the Gambian Championnat National D1. In June 2015, Gamtel FC became the champion for the first time. In October 2023, Gamtel FC was sold to Senegalese football mogul Youssou Faal for 1.5 million dalasi and changed to Serekunda Football Club.

== Achievements ==
- Gambian Championnat National D1: 2

2015, 2018

- Gambian Cup: 4

2010, 2011, 2012, 2013

- Gambian Super Cup: 4

2010, 2011, 2013, 2015

== Performance in CAF competitions ==
- CAF Confederation Cup: 1 appearance

2014 – First round
