= Gambia Armed Forces FC =

Association football club in the Gambia

GAF
- Full name: Gambia Armed Forces Football Club
- Nickname: The KHAKI boys
- Founded: 1989
- Ground: Serekunda East Park, Serekunda
- Capacity: 1,000
- Chairman: Lt. Gen. Baboucarr Ceesay
- Manager: Adama Jatta
- League: GFA League First Division
- 2024–25: 14th
Home colours	Away colours

Gambia Armed Forces Football Club is a Gambian professional football club located in Banjul. It currently plays in GFA League First Division.

== Titles ==
- GFA League First Division: 3

2003, 2009, 2017

- Gambian Cup: 1

2018

- Gambian Super Cup: 3

2004, 2009, 2018

== Performance in CAF competitions ==
- CAF Champions League: 1 appearance

2010 – Preliminary Round
