= Weah =

Weah or WEAH may refer to:

- George Weah, Liberian politician and former footballer who was the FIFA World Player of the Year of 1995
  - Clar Weah, Jamaican businesswoman, wife of George, mother of Timothy, and current first lady of Liberia
    - George Weah Jr., American soccer player, son of George and Clar
    - Timothy Weah, American soccer player, son of George and Clar
  - Jester Weah, American football player, nephew of George
  - Stephen Weah, Liberian footballer, cousin of George
- Edward Weah Dixon, Liberian footballer
- Patrick Weah, Liberian footballer
- Thierry Fidjeu-Tazemeta (also known as Weah), Cameroonian footballer
- KNSS (AM), a radio station (1330 AM) licensed to serve Wichita, Kansas, United States, which held the call sign WEAH from 1922 to 1925
