= George Weah =

President of Liberia from 2018 to 2024

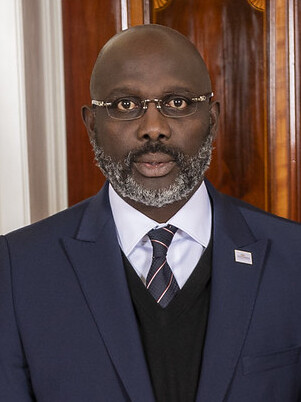
- Weah in 2022

25th President of Liberia
- In office 22 January 2018 – 22 January 2024
- Vice President: Jewel Taylor
- Preceded by: Ellen Johnson Sirleaf
- Succeeded by: Joseph Boakai

Member of the Senate of Liberia
- In office 14 January 2015 – 22 January 2018
- Preceded by: Joyce Musu Freeman-Sumo
- Succeeded by: Saah Joseph
- Constituency: Montserrado County

Personal details
- Born: George Manneh Oppong Weah; 1 October 1966 (age 60) Monrovia, Liberia
- Party: Congress for Democratic Change
- Other political affiliations: Coalition for Democratic Change
- Spouse: Clar Duncan (m. 1993)
- Children: 4, including George Jr. and Timothy
- Education: DeVry University
- Occupation: Politician; footballer
Association football career
- Height: 1.85 m (6 ft 1 in)
- Position: Striker
Senior career*
Years	Team	Apps	(Gls)
1981–1984	Young Survivors		(34+)
1984–1985	Bong Range United	2	(1)
1985–1986	Mighty Barrolle	10	(7)
1986–1987	Invincible Eleven	23	(24)
1987	Africa Sports	2	(1)
1987–1988	Tonnerre Yaoundé	18	(14)
1988–1992	Monaco	103	(47)
1992–1995	Paris Saint-Germain	96	(32)
1995–2000	AC Milan	114	(46)
2000	→ Chelsea (loan)	11	(3)
2000	Manchester City	7	(1)
2000–2001	Marseille	19	(5)
2001–2003	Al Jazira	39	(30)
Total		441	(245)
International career
1986–2018	Liberia	75	(18)
- * Club domestic league appearances and goals

George Manneh Oppong Weah (born 1 October 1966) is a Liberian politician and former professional footballer who served as the 25th president of Liberia from 2018 to 2024. Before his election for the presidency, Weah served as senator from Montserrado County. He played as a striker in his prolific 18-year professional football career which ended in 2003. Weah is the first African former professional footballer to become a head of state, and the only African Ballon d'Or and FIFA World Player of the Year winner in history, winning both awards in 1995. He won the African Footballer of the Year three times and is considered one of the greatest strikers ever.

After beginning his career in his native Liberia, Weah spent 14 years playing for clubs in France, Italy, and England. Arsène Wenger brought him to Europe, signing him for Monaco in 1988. Weah moved to Paris Saint-Germain in 1992 where they won Division 1 in 1994 and became the top scorer of the 1994–95 UEFA Champions League. He signed for AC Milan in 1995 where he spent four successful seasons, winning the Serie A twice. Later in his career, he joined the Premier League having spells at Chelsea and Manchester City, winning the FA Cup with Chelsea, before returning to France to play for Marseille in 2001. He ended his career with Al Jazira in 2003. FourFourTwo named Weah one of the best players never to win the UEFA Champions League.

Weah represented Liberia at the international level, winning 75 caps, scoring 18 goals for his country, and playing at the African Cup of Nations on two occasions. He also played in a friendly in 2018, where his number 14 jersey was retired. Regarded as one of the best players never to have played at the FIFA World Cup, Scott Murray in The Guardian refers to Weah as "hamstrung by hailing from a global minnow".

Widely regarded as one of the greatest African players of all time, Weah was named FIFA World Player of the Year and won the Ballon d'Or in 1995, becoming the first and only player to win these awards while representing an African country internationally. In 1989 and 1995, he was also named the African Footballer of the Year winning the official award twice, and in 1996, he was named African Player of the Century. Known for his acceleration, speed, and dribbling ability, in addition to his goal-scoring, Weah was described by FIFA as "the precursor of the multi-functional strikers of today". In 2004, he was named by Pelé in the FIFA 100 list of the world's greatest living players.

Weah became involved in politics in Liberia following his retirement from football. He formed the Congress for Democratic Change and ran unsuccessfully for president in the 2005 election, losing to Ellen Johnson Sirleaf in the second round of voting. In the 2011 election, he ran unsuccessfully for vice president alongside Winston Tubman. Weah was subsequently elected to the Senate of Liberia for Montserrado County in the 2014 election. Weah was elected President of Liberia in the 2017 election, defeating the incumbent vice president Joseph Boakai, and was sworn in on 22 January 2018. Weah was defeated in a rematch with Boakai in the 2023 election.

== Early life and education ==
George Manneh Oppong Weah was born on 1 October 1966 in Monrovia, the capital city of Liberia, and was raised in Clara Town, a slum in the city. He is a member of the Kru ethnic group, which hails from south-eastern part of Liberia, one of the poorest areas of the country. His father, William T. Weah Sr., was a mechanic while his mother, Anna Quaye Weah (d. 2013), was a merchant. He has three brothers, William, Moses, and Wolo. He was one of thirteen children largely raised by his devoutly Christian paternal grandmother, Emma Klonjlaleh Brown after his parents separated when Weah was still a baby. He attended middle school at Muslim Congress and high school at Wells Hairston High School and reportedly dropped out in his final year of studies.

== Football career ==
=== Club career ===
==== Early career in Liberia, Cameroon, Monaco and France ====
Weah began to play football for Young Survivors, a club based in Clara Town, in 1981 at the age of 15. Jason Burke, writing for The Observer, described how Weah scored "two spectacular goals" on his debut in 1982, "one hit from such a tight angle that it went in-off having struck both posts"; he scored 34 goals during the 1982 Liberia Football Association Fourth Division season. In his three years with Young Survivors, the club earned two promotions, from the fourth level of football in Liberia to the second.

He signed for Liberian Premier League club Bong Range United in 1984, where he played for one season, before joining Mighty Barrolle, one of the biggest clubs in Liberia. Weah was not a regular starter for Mighty Barrolle despite scoring regularly, which prompted a move to their rivals, Invincible Eleven, in 1986. He helped the club win the 1987 Liberian Premier League title, was the league's top scorer, and was named as the league's player of the season. Before his football career allowed him to move abroad, Weah worked for the Liberia Telecommunications Corporation as a switchboard operator. He signed for Cameroonian Premier League club Tonnerre Yaoundé in 1987 after impressing during a match against them, and scored twice on his debut against Canon Yaoundé.

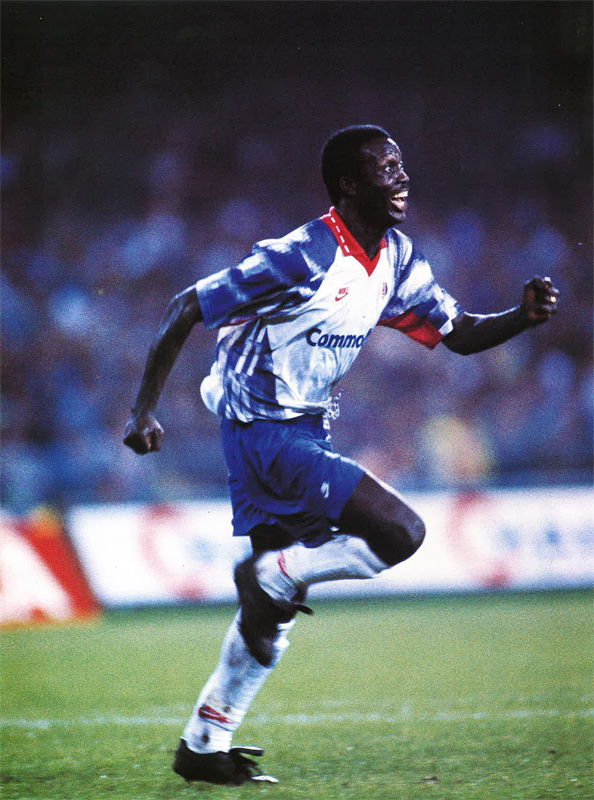
Weah celebrating his goal during the match between PSG and Napoli in the second round of 1992–93 UEFA Cup

Weah's abilities were noticed by the Cameroon national team manager, Claude Le Roy, who recommended him to Arsène Wenger, the manager of French Division 1 club Monaco. Weah signed for Monaco 1988 for a transfer fee of £12,000, after Wenger had flown to Africa prior to the signing to see him play. Weah has credited Wenger as an important influence on his career. During his time with Monaco, Weah was named the African Footballer of the Year for the first time in 1989. This was his first major award and he took it back home for the entire country to celebrate. Weah won the 1990–91 Coupe de France, playing in the final on 8 June in which Monaco beat Marseille 1–0 at the Parc des Princes. He helped Monaco reach the final of the 1991–92 European Cup Winners' Cup, scoring four goals in nine cup appearances.

Weah subsequently played for Paris Saint-Germain (1992–1995), with whom he won the Coupe de France in 1993 and 1995, Division 1 in 1994, and the Coupe de la Ligue in 1995 during a highly prolific and successful period; he also became the top scorer of the 1994–95 UEFA Champions League, with seven goals, after reaching the semi-finals with the club, one of which was a skillful individual "wonder-goal" against Bayern Munich in the group stage, on 23 November 1994. During his time at the club, he also managed to reach the semi-finals of the 1992–93 UEFA Cup, and the semi-finals of the 1993–94 European Cup Winners' Cup; in total, he scored 16 goals in 25 European games. In 1994, he won the African Footballer of the Year Award for the second time in his career.

==== AC Milan and individual success ====
Weah joined AC Milan in 1995, winning the Italian league in 1996 under Fabio Capello. He played alongside Roberto Baggio and Dejan Savićević in Milan's attack, as well as Marco Simone on occasion, and finished the season as Milan's top goalscorer. He won the Serie A title once again in 1999. During his time with the club, he also reached the 1998 Coppa Italia final, and finished as runner-up in the Supercoppa Italiana on two occasions, in 1996 and 1999. Despite their European dominance in the early 1990s, Milan was less successful in Europe during this time, however, with their best result being a quarter-final finish in the 1995–96 UEFA Cup.

Exhibiting skill, athleticism and goalscoring prowess, Weah became famous at Milan for scoring several notable goals, in particular a solo goal against Hellas Verona at the San Siro which saw him deftly control the ball from Verona's corner kick just outside his penalty area, before he set off. With all his teammates back defending the corner Weah made a beeline for goal, leaving his teammates in his wake. His teammate Zvonimir Boban stated, "It was an incredible run. We were thinking, 'When's he going to stop? When's he going to stop? He's not going to stop! He's never going to stop!'". Weah finished by rifling the ball into the bottom left corner before an exuberant goal celebration.

Due to his performances with both Paris Saint-Germain and Milan, in 1995 Weah was the recipient of several individual awards: he won the Ballon d'Or, the Onze d'Or, and was named FIFA World Player of the Year, becoming the first and, currently, only African player (by FIFA nationality) to win these awards, and second African-born player to do so after Eusébio. Weah dedicated his FIFA World Player of the Year victory to his former manager, Arsène Wenger, stating that it was thanks to him that he was able to develop into a world-class player. That year, Weah also won the African Player of the Year Award for the third time in his career, and was named to the Onze de Onze by the French football magazine Onze Mondial. In 1996, Weah finished second in the FIFA World Player of the Year ranking; he was also the recipient of the FIFA Fair Play Award, and was voted the African Player of the Century by sport journalists from around the world.

On 20 November 1996, after Milan's Champions League draw at Porto, Weah broke the nose of Portuguese defender Jorge Costa in the players' tunnel, resulting in a six-match European ban. Weah said he exploded in frustration after putting up with racist tauntings from Costa during both of the team's Champions League matches that autumn. Costa strenuously denied the accusations of racism and was not charged by UEFA as no witnesses could verify Weah's allegations, not even his Milan teammates. Weah later attempted to apologise to Costa but this was rebuffed by the Portuguese, who considered the charges of racist insults levelled against him to be defamatory and took Weah to court. The incident led to Costa undergoing facial surgery and he was subsequently sidelined for three weeks. Despite the incident, Weah still received the FIFA Fair Play Award in 1996.

==== Later career ====
Weah signed for English Premier League club Chelsea on loan from Milan on 11 January 2000, in a deal which would keep him with the West London club until the end of the 1999–2000 season. Although past his prime, Weah's time in England was deemed a success, especially at Chelsea where he instantly endeared himself to their fans by scoring the winner against rivals Tottenham Hotspur on his debut, and scored further league goals against Wimbledon and Liverpool. He also scored twice in Chelsea's victorious 1999–2000 FA Cup netting crucial goals against Leicester City and Gillingham. This led to him starting in the final, which Chelsea won 1–0.

Chelsea manager Gianluca Vialli did not make Weah's move permanent, and, on 1 August 2000, he officially left Milan, and signed for newly promoted Premier League side Manchester City on a free transfer on a two-year contract worth £30,000 a week, declining the offer of a £1 million pay-off from Milan owner Silvio Berlusconi. He played 11 games in all competitions for City, scoring four times, before leaving on 16 October 2000 after becoming dissatisfied with manager Joe Royle for selecting him as a substitute too frequently; he had only played the full 90 minutes in three of his 11 games for the Maine Road club. At City, he scored once in the league against Liverpool (as he did at Chelsea), and three times against Gillingham (again as he had at Chelsea), this time in the League Cup; once in the first leg and twice in the second.

Following his time in England, Weah returned to France and had a spell at Marseille, where he remained until May 2001. He later played with Al Jazira in the UAE Football League, where he remained until his retirement as a player in 2003, at age 37. He had planned on joining the New York/New Jersey MetroStars of Major League Soccer but elected to join Al Jazira temporarily.

=== International career ===
Since making his debut for the Liberia national team against Burkina Faso on 23 February 1986, Weah played 75 games, scoring 18 goals. Representing one of the smaller nations in world football and perennial underdogs, Weah did much to support the national squad: aside from being the team's star player, he also later coached the squad and even funded his national side to a large extent. Despite his efforts, he was unsuccessful in helping Liberia qualify for a single FIFA World Cup, falling just a point short in qualifying for the 2002 tournament. However, he did help Liberia to qualify for the African Cup of Nations on two occasions: Weah represented his country in the 1996 and 2002 editions of the tournament, although Liberia failed to make it out of their group both times, suffering first-round eliminations.

Weah has been named by several media outlets as one of the best players to never play at the World Cup.

One of the greatest African players of all time, George Weah was, like his namesake George Best before him, hamstrung in World Cup terms by hailing from a global minnow.

— Scott Murray writing for The Guardian on Weah's "stand-alone effort" to get his nation to a World Cup.

Weah returned to the national team for a specially arranged friendly against Nigeria on 11 September 2018, his final international appearance, playing at the age of 51 while in office as the country's president. His number 14 shirt, worn at his playing peak, was retired after the friendly, with Weah receiving a standing ovation when he was substituted.

=== Player profile ===
==== Style of play ====
During his prime in the 1990s, Weah was regarded as one of the best strikers in the world. He was lauded for his speed, work rate, stamina, and attacking instincts, as well as his physical and athletic attributes, which he combined with his finishing, technical ability, and creativity. A fast, powerful, physically strong player, with an eye for goal, many observers agree that he successfully filled the void left in the Milan attack by club great Marco van Basten. In addition to his pace, acceleration, dribbling skills, and goalscoring ability, as a multi-functional forward Weah was also a team player who was capable of creating chances and assisting goals for teammates. Along with Ronaldo and Romário, Weah was viewed as a modern, new style of striker in the 1990s who would also operate outside the penalty area and run with the ball towards goal, at a time when strikers primarily operated inside the penalty area where they would receive the ball from teammates. Among the next generation of strikers who were inspired, Thierry Henry states, "George Weah, Romário, and Ronaldo changed the game for me. It was the first time as a striker I saw players that could score on their own. Pick the ball up anywhere and score. Before as a number nine, people would say ' Stay within the line of the box, don't move too much, don't go to the wings, don't drop, stay.' Then I saw George Weah. And then I saw Ronaldo. And I saw Romário differently before those two. And it was like 'hang on a minute, someone has lied to me'."

One such goal that exemplified this ability was against Verona in 1995 where he received the ball in the edge of his penalty box and ran the length of the field. Scoring such a goal in Serie A – the best defensive league in the world – saw media outlets such as Gazzetta dello Sport running pages of analysis for days afterward, and calling it the greatest strike of all in Italian football. On his impact on the sport, Weah states, "When I look at my idols – Pelé, Maradona, Beckenbauer, Cruyff – they did a lot of great things. I came into the game and made history too."

==== Reception ====
Named African Footballer of the Year three times and the first African to win the Ballon d'Or and be named FIFA World Player of the Year, Weah's prominence in the 1990s led him to be nicknamed "King George". 90min included him in their list of the 50 greatest players of all time. Weah is often hailed as one of the greatest African footballers of all time, being named African Player of the Century in 1996, and often ranked among the three greatest African strikers ever, alongside Didier Drogba and Samuel Eto'o. In 2013, Milan great Franco Baresi named Weah in the greatest XI he has ever played with. FourFourTwo magazine named Weah one of the best players never to win the UEFA Champions League. A number of publications, including Scott Murray of The Guardian and Kevin Baxter of the Los Angeles Times, in addition to FIFA, consider him to be one of the greatest players never to feature at the World Cup.

The status of Weah in the sport saw him feature in EA Sports' FIFA video game series where he was named in the Ultimate Team Legends in FIFA 14. During his playing career Weah was sponsored by sportswear company Diadora, and he became famous for his red Diadora boots while playing for AC Milan.

== Career statistics ==
=== Club ===
Appearances and goals by club, season, and competition
Club	Season	League			National cup (Note: Includes Coupe de France, Coppa Italia, FA Cup)		League cup (Note: Includes Coupe de la Ligue, Football League Cup)		Europe		Other		Total	
Club	Season	Division	Apps	Goals	Apps	Goals	Apps	Goals	Apps	Goals	Apps	Goals	Apps	Goals
Monaco	1988–89	Division 1	23	14	10	1	—		5 (Note: Appearances in European Cup)	2	—		38	17
Monaco	1989–90	Division 1	17	5	0	0	—		7 (Note: Appearances in European Cup Winners' Cup)	3	—		24	8
Monaco	1990–91	Division 1	29	10	6	5	—		5 (Note: Appearances in UEFA Cup)	3	—		40	18
Monaco	1991–92	Division 1	34	18	4	1	—		9	4	—		47	23
Monaco	Total		103	47	20	7	—		26	12	—		149	66
Paris Saint-Germain	1992–93	Division 1	30	14	6	2	—		9	7	—		45	23
Paris Saint-Germain	1993–94	Division 1	32	11	3	2	—		5	1	—		40	14
Paris Saint-Germain	1994–95	Division 1	34	7	5	2	3	1	11 (Note: Appearance(s) in UEFA Champions League)	8	—		53	18
Paris Saint-Germain	Total		96	32	14	6	3	1	25	16	—		138	55
AC Milan	1995–96	Serie A	26	11	3	1	—		6	3	—		35	15
AC Milan	1996–97	Serie A	28	13	2	0	—		5	3	1 (Note: Appearance in Supercoppa Italiana)	0	36	16
AC Milan	1997–98	Serie A	24	10	8	3	—		—		—		32	13
AC Milan	1998–99	Serie A	26	8	4	1	—		—		—		30	9
AC Milan	1999–2000	Serie A	10	4	2	0	—		1	1	1	0	14	5
AC Milan	Total		114	46	19	5	—		12	7	2	0	147	58
Chelsea (loan)	1999–2000	Premier League	11	3	4	2	—		—		—		15	5
Manchester City	2000–01	Premier League	7	1	—		2	3	—		—		9	4
Marseille	2000–01	Division 1	19	5	1	0	—		—		—		20	5
Career total			350	134	58	20	5	4	63	35	2	0	478	193

=== International ===
Appearances and goals by national team and year
National team	Year	Apps	Goals
Liberia	1986	4	0
Liberia	1987	9	6
Liberia	1988	4	1
Liberia	1989	5	1
Liberia	1992	1	0
Liberia	1993	2	0
Liberia	1994	3	1
Liberia	1995	5	0
Liberia	1996	6	1
Liberia	1997	8	2
Liberia	1998	3	0
Liberia	1999	3	1
Liberia	2000	7	1
Liberia	2001	11	3
Liberia	2002	3	1
Liberia	2018	1	0
Total		75	18

Scores and results list Liberia's goal tally first, score column indicates score, where known, after each Weah goal

List of international goals scored by George Weah
No.	Date	Venue	Cap	Opponent	Score	Result	Competition	Ref.
1	30 January 1987	Monrovia, Liberia	5	Nigeria		2–0	1987 West African Nations Cup	
2	1 February 1987	Monrovia, Liberia	6	Burkina Faso		2–0	1987 West African Nations Cup	
3	6 February 1987	Monrovia, Liberia	7	Togo		3–0	1987 West African Nations Cup	
4	26 July 1987	Monrovia, Liberia	11	Morocco		2–1	Friendly	
5	20 December 1987	Monrovia, Liberia	12	Burkina Faso	1–0	1–0	1987 CEDEAO Cup	
6	23 December 1987	Monrovia, Liberia	13	Ivory Coast		1–2	1987 CEDEAO Cup	
7	21 August 1988	SKD Stadium, Monrovia, Liberia	15	Ghana	1–0	2–0	1990 FIFA World Cup qualification	
8	11 June 1989	SKD Stadium, Monrovia, Liberia	20	Malawi	1–0	1–0	1990 FIFA World Cup qualification	
9	4 September 1994	SKD Stadium, Monrovia, Liberia	26	Togo	1–0	1–0	1996 African Cup of Nations qualification	
10	23 June 1996	Accra Sports Stadium, Accra, Ghana	37	Gambia	2–0	4–0	1998 FIFA World Cup qualification	
11	6 April 1997	Accra Sports Stadium, Accra, Ghana	42	Egypt	1–0	1–0	1998 FIFA World Cup qualification	
12	22 June 1997	SKD Stadium, Monrovia, Liberia	44	DR Congo	2–0	2–1	1998 African Cup of Nations qualification	
13	20 June 1999	SKD Stadium, Monrovia, Liberia	53	Tunisia	2–0	2–0	2000 African Cup of Nations qualification	
14	16 July 2000	SKD Stadium, Monrovia, Liberia	58	Cape Verde	1–0	3–0	2002 African Cup of Nations qualification	
15	22 April 2001	SKD Stadium, Monrovia, Liberia	65	Sudan	2–0	2–0	2002 FIFA World Cup qualification	
16	14 July 2001	National Stadium, Freetown, Sierra Leone	69	Sierra Leone	1–0	1–0	2002 FIFA World Cup qualification	
17	23 August 2001	Estadio Luis "Pirata" Fuente, Veracruz, Mexico	71	Mexico	1–2	4–5	Friendly	
18	19 January 2002	Stade du 26 Mars, Bamako, Mali	72	Mali	1–0	1–1	2002 African Cup of Nations	

=== Honors ===
Mighty Barrolle

- Liberian Premier League: 1986
- Liberian FA Cup: 1986

Invincible Eleven

- Liberian Premier League: 1987

Monaco

- Coupe de France: 1990–91

Paris Saint-Germain

- Division 1: 1993–94
- Coupe de France: 1992–93, 1994–95
- Coupe de la Ligue: 1994–95

AC Milan

- Serie A: 1995–96, 1998–99

Chelsea

- FA Cup: 1999–2000

Liberia

- West African Nations Cup runner-up: 1987

Individual

- Liberia Football Association Fourth Division top goalscorer: 1982
- African Footballer of the Year: 1989, 1995
- World XI: 1991, 1996 (Reserve), 1997, 1998
- Division 1 Foreign Player of the Year: 1990–91
- UEFA Champions League top scorer: 1994–95
- BBC African Footballer of the Year: 1995
- Onze d'Or: 1995
- Ballon d'Or: 1995
- RSSSF Player of the Year: 1995
- El País King of European Soccer: 1995
- FIFA World Player of the Year: 1995
- ESM Team of the Year: 1995–96
- Onze d'Argent: 1996
- FIFA Fair Play Award: 1996
- FIFA World Player of the Year – Silver award: 1996
- Planète Foot's 50 Best Players of all Time: 1996
- IFFHS African Player of the Century: 1999
- World Soccer's 100 Greatest Footballers of All Time: 1999
- Placar's 100 Stars of the Century: 1999
- FIFA 100: 2004
- Arthur Ashe Courage Award 2004
- Golden Foot Legends Award: 2005
- AC Milan Hall of Fame
- IFFHS Legends
- World Hall of Fame of Soccer
- France Football Légendes Africaines Top-30: 2019
- IFFHS All-time Africa Men's Dream Team: 2021

== Humanitarianism ==
Weah is a devoted humanitarian for his war-torn country. During his playing career he became a UN Goodwill Ambassador. At the 2004 ESPY Awards at the Kodak Theatre, Los Angeles, Weah won the Arthur Ashe Courage Award for his efforts. He has also been named a UNICEF Goodwill Ambassador, a role which he has suspended in his political career. Off the football pitch, he stood out throughout his career for his initiatives to fight against racism in the game.

=== Football and children ===
Weah has tried to use football as a way to bring happiness and promote education for children in Liberia. In 1998, Weah launched a CD called Lively Up Africa featuring the singer Frisbie Omo Isibor and eight other African football stars. The proceeds from this CD went to children's programs in the countries of origin of the athletes involved.

Weah was President of Junior Professional, a former football club he founded in Monrovia in 1994. As a way to encourage young people to remain in school, the club's only requirement for membership was school attendance. Many of the young people, recruited from all over Liberia, went on to play for the Liberian national team. Weah was also actively involved with youth programs in a Liberian enclave on Staten Island, New York, when he resided there for a time.

=== Football academies ===
The Diya Group chairman and Indian entrepreneur Nirav Tripathi announced a multimillion-dollar partnership with Weah in 2016, whereby global football academies would be established to help assist youth in both impoverished and emerging nations.

The motivation for the academies is cited as a shared experience between both Tripathi and Weah in how sport can transform lives in their nations of India and Liberia, which both still suffer from severe poverty.

== Political career ==
=== 2005 presidential bid ===
Following the end of the Second Liberian Civil War, Weah announced his intention to run for President of Liberia in the 2005 election, forming the Congress for Democratic Change to back his candidacy. While Weah was a popular figure in Liberia, opponents cited his lack of formal education as a handicap to his ability to lead the country, in contrast with his Harvard-educated opponent, Ellen Johnson Sirleaf. Analysts also noted Weah's lack of experience, calling him a "babe-in-the-woods", while Sirleaf had served as minister of finance in the William Tolbert administration in the 1970s and had held positions at Citibank, the World Bank and the United Nations. Weah's eligibility to run for presidency was also called into question as it was reported that he had become a French citizen in his footballing career at Paris Saint-Germain, but these complaints were rebuffed by the electoral commission in court and Weah was allowed to proceed.

Weah obtained a plurality of votes in the first round of voting on 11 October, garnering 28.3% of the vote. This qualified him to compete in a run-off election against Sirleaf, the second placed candidate. However, he lost the run-off to Sirleaf on 8 November, garnering only 40.6% to 59.4% for Sirleaf. Weah alleged that the election had been rigged through voter intimidation and ballot tampering, and many of his supporters protested the results in the streets of Monrovia. However, after assurances that the vote was fair, several prominent African leaders called on Weah's supporters to accept the result with grace and dignity, and Sirleaf became president. The African Union had characterised the election as "peaceful, transparent, and fair".

Weah's lack of education became a campaign issue. He has been highly critical of those who say he is not fit to govern: "With all their education and experience, they have governed this nation for hundreds of years. They have never done anything for the nation." He initially claimed to have a BA degree in sport management from Parkwood University in London; however, this is an unaccredited diploma mill, which awards certificates without requiring study. Weah then pursued a degree in business administration at DeVry University in Miami.

=== 2009–2016 ===
Weah also remained active in Liberian politics, returning from the United States in 2009 to successfully campaign for the Congress for Democratic Change candidate in the Montserrado County senatorial by-election. Some analysts saw these moves as preparation for a repeat run for the presidency in 2011, and Weah did indeed later announce his intention to challenge Sirleaf in the 2011 election. After a series of failed alliances with other opposition parties, the Congress for Democratic Change chose Weah as its 2011 vice presidential candidate, running with presidential candidate Winston Tubman. The Tubman/ Weah ticket managed to capture 32.7% of the vote in the first round with Sirleaf getting 43.9% of the vote. As neither had a majority the election, following the two-round system, proceeded to the next round. However, in the second round Sirleaf was re-elected, with the Tubman / Weah ticket receiving only 9.3% of the vote.

In 2014, he ran for election to the Senate of Liberia as a Congress for Democratic Change candidate in Montserrado County. He was elected to the Liberian Senate on 20 December 2014. Weah defeated Robert Sirleaf, the son of President Sirleaf, becoming the first Liberian international athlete elected to represent a county in the legislature. He won a landslide victory, receiving 99,226 votes, which represented 78.0% of the total votes from the 141 polling centers, while Sirleaf, his closest rival received 13,692 votes, which is nearly 11% in the election marred only by a low turnout. Following his election, Weah only occasionally attended sessions of the Senate and did not introduce or sponsor any legislation.

=== 2016 presidential bid ===
In April 2016, Weah announced his intention to run for President of Liberia in the 2017 election, standing for the Coalition for Democratic Change. After winning the first round of the 2017 election with 38.4% of the vote, he and Joseph Boakai of the Unity Party went into the second round of the election. In the second round, Weah was elected President of Liberia, winning a run-off against vice president Joseph Boakai with more than 60% of the vote.

== Presidency (2018–2024) ==
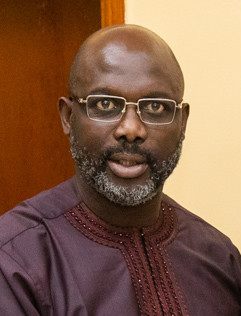
Weah in 2019

Weah was sworn in as president on 22 January 2018, making him the fourth youngest-serving president in Africa, marking Liberia's first democratic transition in 74 years. He cited fighting corruption, reforming the economy, combating illiteracy and improving life conditions as the main targets of his presidency. Two other world class African strikers, Didier Drogba and Samuel Eto'o, attended the inauguration. As President, Weah has come under criticism for inciting violence on opposition candidates including Telia Urey in 2019. On 15 August 2022, three senior members of Weah's cabinet were sanctioned by the United States for alleged corruption.

=== Economic policy ===
After winning the 2017 election, Weah promised a Pro-Poor Agenda for Development and Prosperity, saying that this will benefit not just the poor, but all Liberians.

In 2019 inflation went as high as 28%. It made many Liberians to worry which led protests called "Save the State" in Monrovia and in Washington, D.C.

In September 2019, Weah attended the National Economic Dialogue (NED), seeking solutions amidst Liberia's economic crisis. A host of organizations rallied to develop a comprehensive program aimed at bolstering Liberia's economy. Weah urged Liberians to use the Dialogue as a national platform to craft strategies and offer workable solutions for the crisis. The forum yielded several recommendations, some of which are listed below:

- Review of recommendations of the TRC including the establishment of economic and war crimes court
- Printing of new currency
- Broad-based review of the national custom code
- Recapitalization of the Central Bank of Liberia
- Review of domestic and external debts
- Practical agriculture programs, peace and national reconciliation

During his second year in office, Weah and his administration witnessed a deterioration in the economy, with inflation reaching 30%. This economic downturn, coupled with payment delays, triggered protests against which the police employed tear gas and water cannons.

During his fourth State of the Nation address, President Weah presented a series of proposed economic policies and legislative reforms, aiming to address the worsening economic conditions.

After Weah came to power, Liberia's unemployment rate increased from 3% in 2017 to 4.1%. The Liberian economy grew 1–5% in the first five years of his administration (2018–2022).

=== Domestic policy ===
On 29 January 2018, in his first annual message to the national legislature, he reduced his salary and other benefits by 25% with immediate effect, stating, "With the assessment that I gave you earlier of the poor condition of our economy, I believe that it is appropriate that we should all make sacrifices in the interest of our country. According to Article 60 of the Constitution of Liberia, the salaries of the president and the vice president are established by the Legislature of Liberia and cannot be increased or reduced during the period for which they are elected. However, in view of the very rapidly deteriorating situation of the economy, I am informing you today, with immediate effect, that I will reduce my salary and benefits by 25% and give the proceeds back to the Consolidated Fund for allocation and appropriation as they see fit."

On 29 January 2018, Weah announced he would seek constitutional changes to allow people of different ethnic descent to be citizens and allow foreigners to own land. He called the present situation "racist and inappropriate".

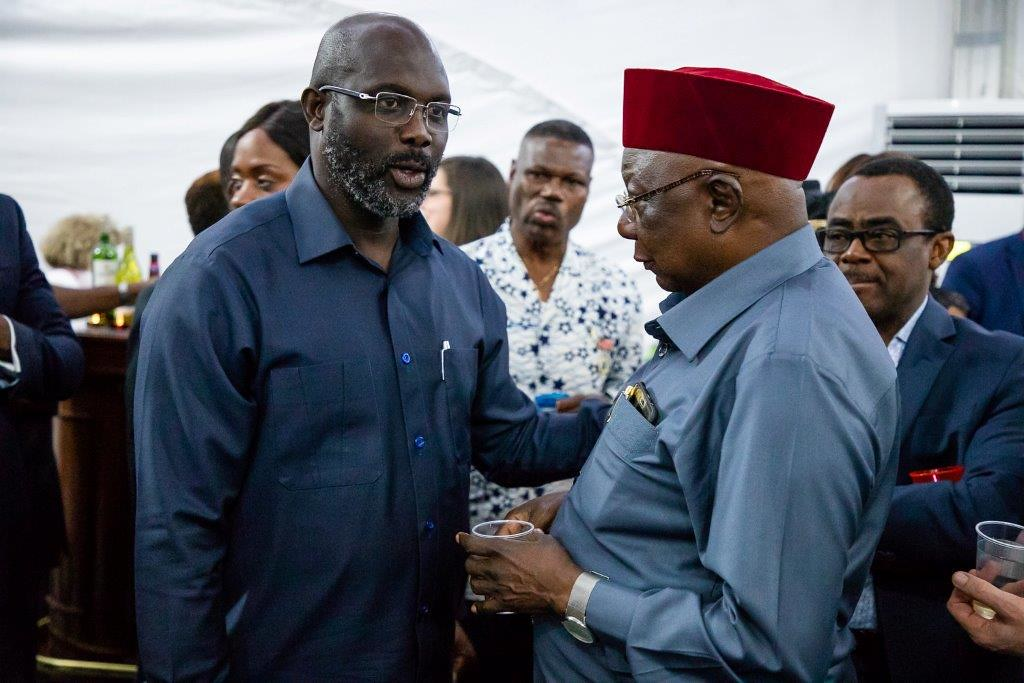
Weah at a 4 July celebration in 2018.

On 12 September 2020, he declared a national emergency over sexual violence in the country, pledging to create a special prosecutor for rape, a national sex offender registry, and a national task force to tackle the issue. He further announced a 2 million dollar emergency fund, part of which was used to purchase DNA-testing equipment for forensic identification of perpetrators. However, as of March 2022, the DNA-testing equipment had yet to be made functional. As well, the special prosecutor had yet to be appointed, the sex offender registry had yet to be implemented, and specialized gender-based violence courts had only been implemented in three of the sixteen Liberian counties.

Weah signed a drug bill into law which passed by the legislature after months. The law aimed to regulate, restrict, control, limit, or eradicate the illegal export and importation as well as the flagrant use, abuse, and proliferation of narcotics within the nation.

Months before the 2023 election, he accepted the endorsement of the Bassa people for re-election. They did this because "he has the competence and passion to develop Liberia."

Under his presidency Liberia has made improvements to education by constructing and renovating schools to make sure children have better education and environment.

=== Healthcare ===
Healthcare in Liberia improved since he became president in 2018. His administration invested into health infrastructure and medical equipment. He also deployed doctors to many underserved areas of the country. Weah instituted health insurance programs. Liberia's first dialysis center was built under his administration.

=== Foreign policy ===
Upon his election to office, Weah first made an official visit in Senegal to meet with President Macky Sall, to "strengthen the bond between the two countries". On 21 February 2018, Weah made his first official visit outside Africa, to France, meeting French president Emmanuel Macron. The meeting focused on improving the relationship between France and Liberia and also sought French help for a sports development project in Africa. The meeting was also attended by Didier Drogba, Kylian Mbappé and FIFA president Gianni Infantino. On 25 May 2018, following a meeting with President Weah, the Liberian Football Association president Musa Bility announced that Liberia would vote for the Canada–Mexico–United States World Cup bid, breaking ranks with the rest of Africa, who were voting for the Moroccan bid.

He made a visit to China to congratulate Xi Jinping on his re-election of General Secretary of the Chinese Communist Party as well as the top leader of China. President Weah said he looked forward to further cementing the strong ties that exist between both countries since establishment between both nations.

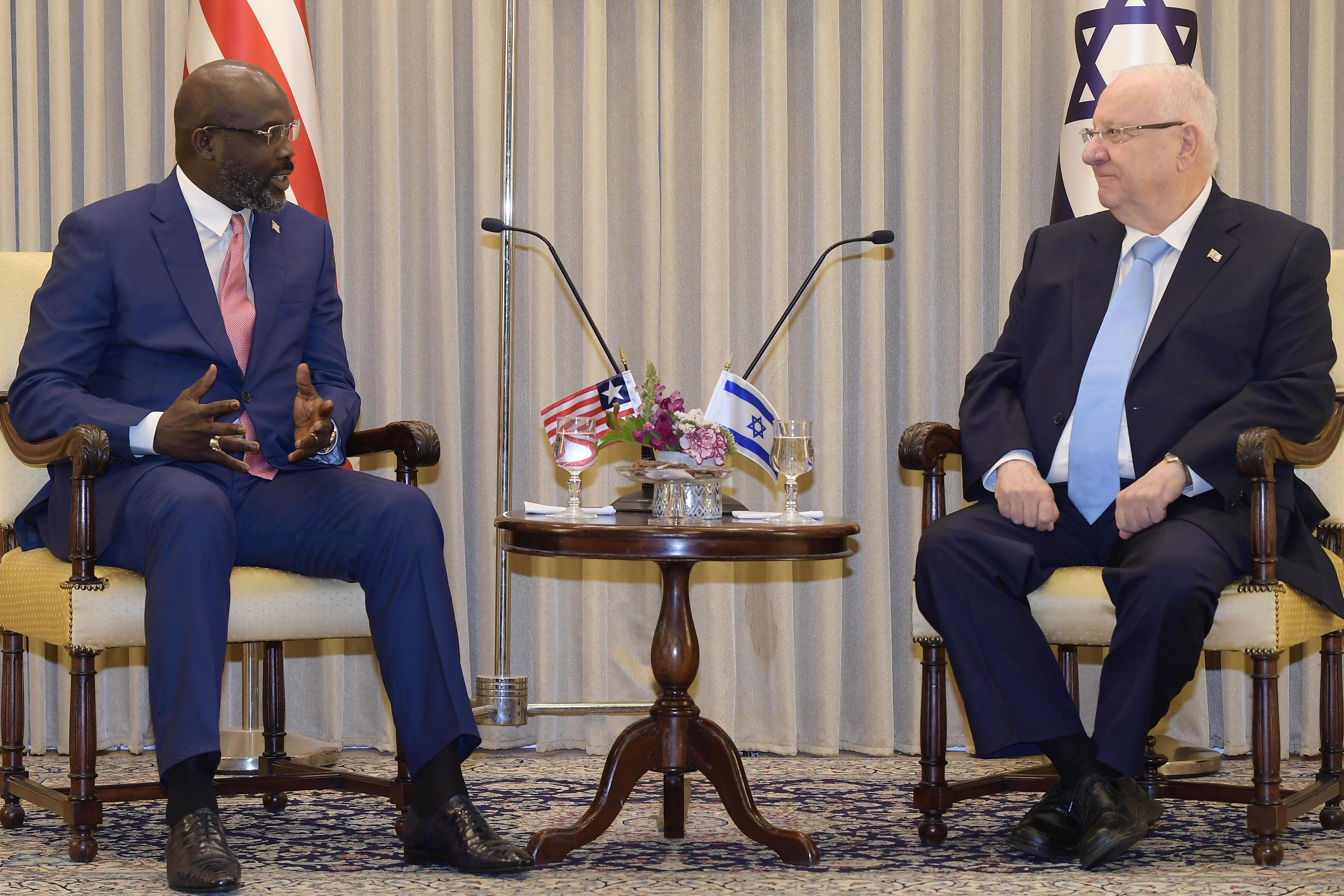
Weah with Reuven Rivlin in Israel, 2019.

In July 2023, he met with Israeli prime minister Benjamin Netanyahu to discuss topics of cementing ties, trade, cooperation on international affairs, peace, and security.

=== Song ===
On 25 March 2020, the Liberian president recorded his song with the local group The Rabbis, the text of which was written by himself. In this song "He invites the Liberian and African population to stand up by all means against this virus [SARS-CoV-2] which is causing damage around the world."

"It could be your mother, it could be your dad, your brothers or your sisters. Let's all stand together to fight this dirty virus"-an extract from President Weah's song on a reggae rhythm. The majority of people in Liberia do not have internet or Facebook access, but radio is a popular and very accessible form of entertainment in the African country.. The song would be played on various stations across the country to properly broadcast the message, according to the president's spokesperson.

Weah had already recorded a song against Ebola.

== Personal life ==
Weah has four children; three with his Jamaican-born wife Clar Weah: George, Tita, and Timothy; and a child from another relationship. In 2016, he was sued by the mother of his daughter for child support expenses. George and Timothy became footballers and signed for Paris Saint-Germain, with Timothy going on to play for the first team. Both played as youth internationals for the United States, and Timothy went on to play for the senior team. Weah has a cousin, Stephen Weah, who also played as a footballer for Preston Lions FC of Melbourne, Australia. His nephew Jester is a former gridiron football player in the National and Canadian Football Leagues.

Weah practiced Islam for ten years before converting to Christianity. In October 2017, he was spotted in the church of prominent Nigerian pastor T. B. Joshua alongside Liberian senator Prince Johnson. Joshua was allegedly a key influence in Johnson's decision to endorse Weah's candidacy in the 2017 election.

Weah holds French citizenship and speaks French fluently.

== See also ==
- List of association football families
- List of sportsperson-politicians
