= Onze d'Or =

Association football award

- Date: 1976; 50 years ago
- Presented by: Onze Mondial
- First award: 1976
- Current holder: (France) Kylian Mbappé (1st award)

Highlights
- Most awards: (Argentina) Lionel Messi (4 awards)

The Onze d'Or (alternative name: Onze Mondial European Footballer of the Year) is an association football award given by French magazine Onze Mondial since 1976. The award honors the best player in Europe, with any player in a European league eligible. Since 1991, there has also been a vote for the best coach of the year.

Onze Mondial's readers select their ideal team of the season, Onze de Onze ("Onze's eleven"), and among those players they choose the top three, who receive the Onze d'Or ("Golden Onze"), Onze d'Argent ("Silver Onze"), and Onze de Bronze ("Bronze Onze"), respectively. The awards were based on the previous calendar year until 2009, but moved to a seasonal format beginning with the 2010–11 season.

Lionel Messi is the only player to have won the award on four occasions (2009–2012, 2018). Only two other players have won the Onze d'Or three times: Michel Platini (1983–1985) and Zinedine Zidane (1998, 2000–2001).

== Super Onze d'Or ==
At the 20th anniversary of the magazine in 1995, a Super Onze d'Or was chosen among the previous winners (1976–1995); French legend Michel Platini was the winner of the poll. The top five players selected were:

1. Michel Platini (74%)
2. Marco van Basten (10%)
3. Diego Maradona (5%)
4. Roberto Baggio (4%)
5. Romário (3%)

== Player of the Year ==
Year	Onze d'Or	Onze d'Argent	Onze de Bronze
1976	(Netherlands) Robert Rensenbrink	(England) Kevin Keegan	(France) Dominique Rocheteau
1977	(England) Kevin Keegan	(France) Michel Platini	(Denmark) Allan Simonsen
1978	(Argentina) Mario Kempes	(Austria) Johann Krankl	(Netherlands) Robert Rensenbrink
1979	(England) Kevin Keegan (2)	(England) Trevor Francis	(Netherlands) Robert Rensenbrink (2)
1980	(Germany) Karl-Heinz Rummenigge	(England) Kevin Keegan (2)	(Germany) Horst Hrubesch
1981	(Germany) Karl-Heinz Rummenigge (2)	(Germany) Paul Breitner	(Belgium) Jan Ceulemans
1982	(Italy) Paolo Rossi	(France) Alain Giresse	(Brazil) Falcão
1983	(France) Michel Platini	(Brazil) Falcão	(Germany) Karl-Heinz Rummenigge
1984	(France) Michel Platini (2)	(France) Jean Tigana	(Denmark) Preben Elkjær
1985	(France) Michel Platini (3)	(Denmark) Preben Elkjær	(Argentina) Diego Maradona
1986	(Argentina) Diego Maradona	(France) Manuel Amoros	(England) Gary Lineker
1987	(Argentina) Diego Maradona (2)	(Netherlands) Marco van Basten	(France) Jean Tigana
1988	(Netherlands) Marco van Basten	(Netherlands) Ruud Gullit	(Argentina) Diego Maradona (2)
1989	(Netherlands) Marco van Basten (2)	(Netherlands) Ruud Gullit (2)	(France) Jean-Pierre Papin
1990	(Germany) Lothar Matthäus	(Italy) Salvatore Schillaci	(France) Jean-Pierre Papin (2)
1991	(France) Jean-Pierre Papin	(England) Chris Waddle	(Germany) Lothar Matthäus
1992	(Bulgaria) Hristo Stoichkov	(Netherlands) Marco van Basten (2)	(France) Jean-Pierre Papin (3)
1993	(Italy) Roberto Baggio	(Croatia) Alen Bokšić	(Brazil) Romário
1994	(Brazil) Romário	(Bulgaria) Hristo Stoichkov	(Italy) Roberto Baggio
1995	(Liberia) George Weah	(Italy) Roberto Baggio	(Italy) Paolo Maldini
1996	(France) Eric Cantona	(Liberia) George Weah	(Germany) Matthias Sammer
1997	(Brazil) Ronaldo	(France) Zinedine Zidane	(Italy) Marco Simone
1998	(France) Zinedine Zidane	(France) Fabien Barthez	(France) Emmanuel Petit
1999	(Brazil) Rivaldo	(England) David Beckham	(France) Zinedine Zidane
2000	(France) Zinedine Zidane (2)	(Portugal) Luís Figo	(France) Thierry Henry
2001	(France) Zinedine Zidane (3)	(England) Michael Owen	(France) Robert Pires
2002	(Brazil) Ronaldo (2)	(France) Zinedine Zidane (2)	(Brazil) Ronaldinho
2003	(France) Thierry Henry	(France) Zinedine Zidane (3)	(England) David Beckham
2004	(Ivory Coast) Didier Drogba	(France) Thierry Henry	(Brazil) Ronaldinho (2)
2005	(Brazil) Ronaldinho	(England) Steven Gerrard	(France) Thierry Henry (2)
2006	(France) Thierry Henry (2)	(Brazil) Ronaldinho	(France) Franck Ribéry
2007	(Brazil) Kaká	(Portugal) Cristiano Ronaldo	(Ivory Coast) Didier Drogba
2008	(Portugal) Cristiano Ronaldo	(Argentina) Lionel Messi	(France) Franck Ribéry (2)
2009	(Argentina) Lionel Messi	(Portugal) Cristiano Ronaldo (2)	(Spain) Andrés Iniesta
2010–11	(Argentina) Lionel Messi (2)	(Spain) Andrés Iniesta	(Portugal) Cristiano Ronaldo
2011–12	(Argentina) Lionel Messi (3)	(Portugal) Cristiano Ronaldo (3)	(Colombia) Radamel Falcao
2012–14	This award was canceled during this period		
2014–15 (Note: Only French nationals were eligible.)	(France) Antoine Griezmann	(France) Paul Pogba	(France) Alexandre Lacazette
2015–16	This award was not awarded this season		
2016–17	(Portugal) Cristiano Ronaldo (2)	(Argentina) Lionel Messi (2)	(France) Antoine Griezmann
2017–18	(Argentina) Lionel Messi (4)	(Egypt) Mohamed Salah	(Portugal) Cristiano Ronaldo (2)
2018–19	(Senegal) Sadio Mané	(Argentina) Lionel Messi (3)	(France) Kylian Mbappé
2019–20	This award was not given due to the COVID-19 pandemic		
2020–21	(France) Karim Benzema	(Argentina) Lionel Messi (4)	(Poland) Robert Lewandowski
2021–22	(France) Karim Benzema (2)	(Senegal) Sadio Mané	(Poland) Robert Lewandowski (2)
2022–23	(Norway) Erling Haaland	(France) Karim Benzema	(France) Kylian Mbappé (2)
2023–24	(Brazil) Vinícius Júnior	N/A	N/A
2024–25	(France) Ousmane Dembélé	(Spain) Lamine Yamal	(France) Kylian Mbappé (3)
2025–26	(France) Kylian Mbappé	(Portugal) João Neves	(Georgia (country)) Khvicha Kvaratskhelia

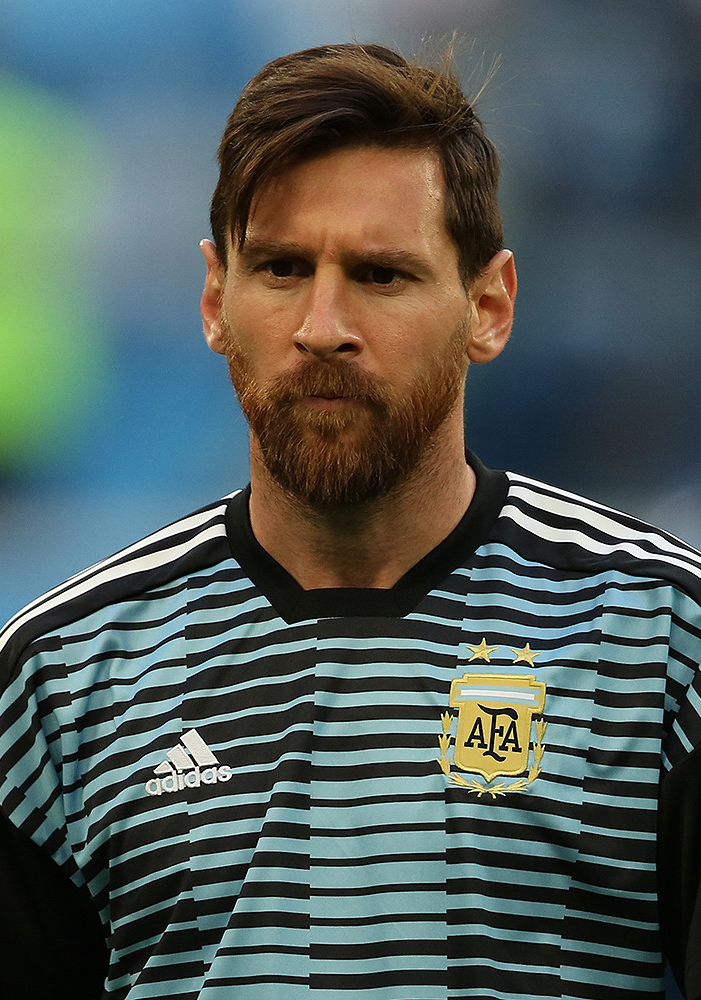
Lionel Messi has won the award a record four times.

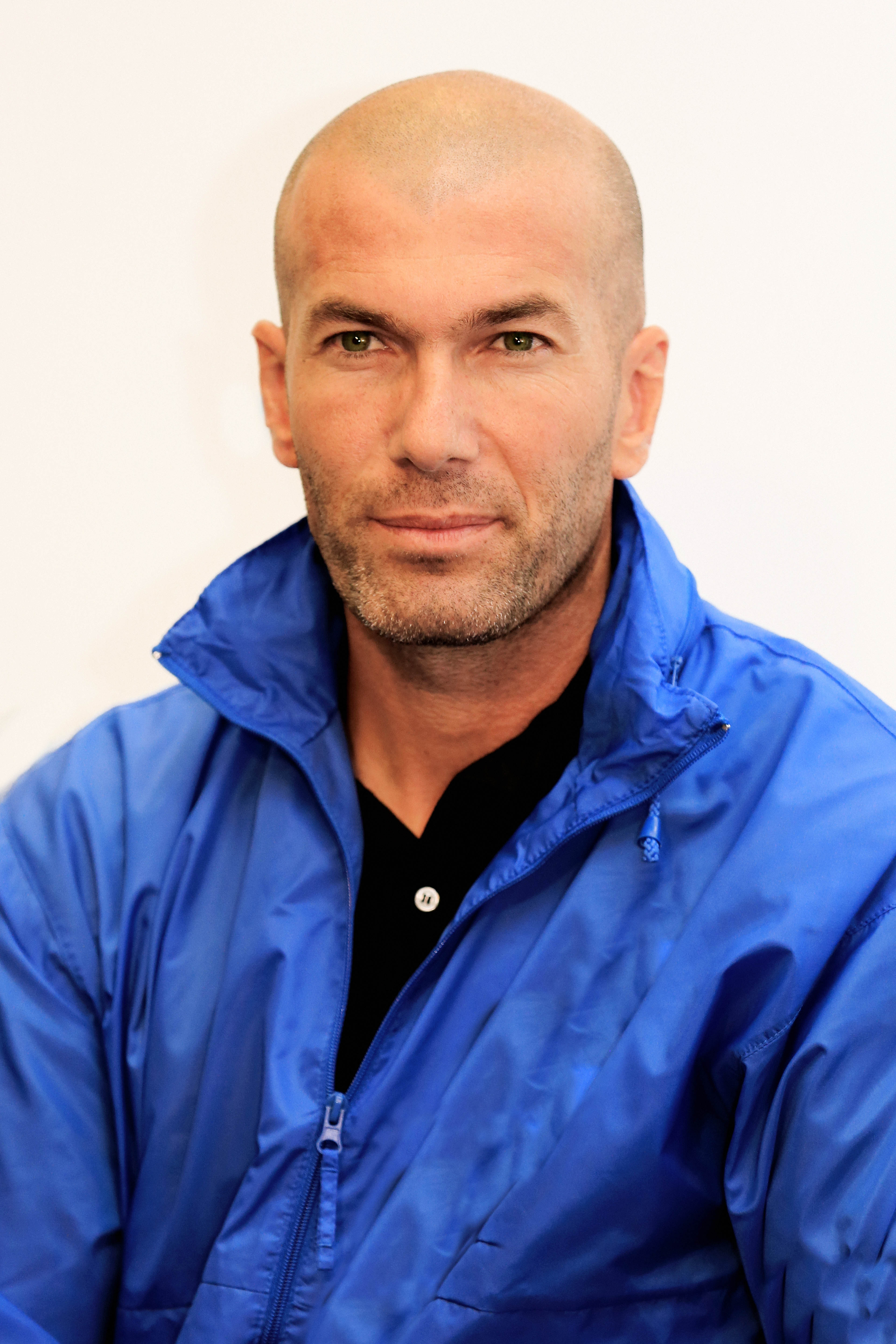
Zinedine Zidane has won the award three times.

Player	Onze d'Or	Onze d'Argent	Onze de Bronze	Total
(Argentina) Lionel Messi	4	4	0	8
(France) Zinedine Zidane	3	3	1	7
(France) Michel Platini	3	1	0	4
(Portugal) Cristiano Ronaldo	2	3	2	7
(England) Kevin Keegan	2	2	0	4
(Netherlands) Marco van Basten	2	2	0	4
(France) Thierry Henry	2	1	2	5
(Argentina) Diego Maradona	2	0	2	4
(France) Karim Benzema	2	1	0	3
(Germany) Karl-Heinz Rummenigge	2	0	1	3
(Brazil) Ronaldo	2	0	0	2
(Brazil) Ronaldinho	1	1	2	4
(Italy) Roberto Baggio	1	1	1	3
(Bulgaria) Hristo Stoichkov	1	1	0	2
(Liberia) George Weah	1	1	0	2
(Senegal) Sadio Mané	1	1	0	2
(France) Jean-Pierre Papin	1	0	3	4
(France) Kylian Mbappé	1	0	3	4
(Netherlands) Robert Rensenbrink	1	0	2	3
(Germany) Lothar Matthäus	1	0	1	2
(Ivory Coast) Didier Drogba	1	0	1	2
(France) Antoine Griezmann	1	0	1	2
(Italy) Paolo Rossi	1	0	0	1
(Norway) Erling Haaland	1	0	0	1
(Brazil) Vinícius Júnior	1	0	0	1
(France) Ousmane Dembélé	1	0	0	1

== Coach of the Year ==
Year	Coach	Club
1991	(Belgium) Raymond Goethals	(France) Marseille
1992	(Netherlands) Johan Cruyff	(Spain) Barcelona
1993	(Belgium) Raymond Goethals (2)	(France) Marseille
1994	(Netherlands) Johan Cruyff (2)	(Spain) Barcelona
1995	(Netherlands) Louis van Gaal	(Netherlands) Ajax
1996	(France) Guy Roux	(France) Auxerre
1997	(Italy) Marcello Lippi	(Italy) Juventus
1998	(France) Aimé Jacquet	France
1999	(Scotland) Alex Ferguson	(England) Manchester United
2000	(France) Arsène Wenger	(England) Arsenal
2001	(France) Gérard Houllier	(England) Liverpool
2002	(France) Arsène Wenger (2)	(England) Arsenal
2003	(France) Arsène Wenger (3)	(England) Arsenal
2004	(France) Arsène Wenger (4)	(England) Arsenal
2005	(Portugal) José Mourinho	(England) Chelsea
2006	(Netherlands) Frank Rijkaard	(Spain) Barcelona
2007	(Scotland) Alex Ferguson (2)	(England) Manchester United
2008	(Scotland) Alex Ferguson (3)	(England) Manchester United
2009	(Spain) Pep Guardiola	(Spain) Barcelona
2010–11	(Spain) Pep Guardiola (2)	(Spain) Barcelona
2011–12	(Spain) Pep Guardiola (3)	(Spain) Barcelona
2012–14	This award was canceled during this period	
2014–15	(France) Hubert Fournier	(France) Lyon
2015–16	This award was not awarded this season	
2016–17	(France) Zinedine Zidane	(Spain) Real Madrid
2017–18	(France) Zinedine Zidane (2)	(Spain) Real Madrid
2018–19	(Germany) Jürgen Klopp	(England) Liverpool
2019–20	This award was not given due to the COVID-19 pandemic	
2020–21	(France) Zinedine Zidane (3)	(Spain) Real Madrid
2021–22	(Italy) Carlo Ancelotti	(Spain) Real Madrid
2022–23	(Italy) Carlo Ancelotti (2)	(Spain) Real Madrid
2023–24	This award was not awarded this season	
2024–25	(Spain) Luis Enrique	(France) Paris Saint-Germain
2025–26	(Spain) Luis Enrique (2)	(France) Paris Saint-Germain

=== Wins by coach ===
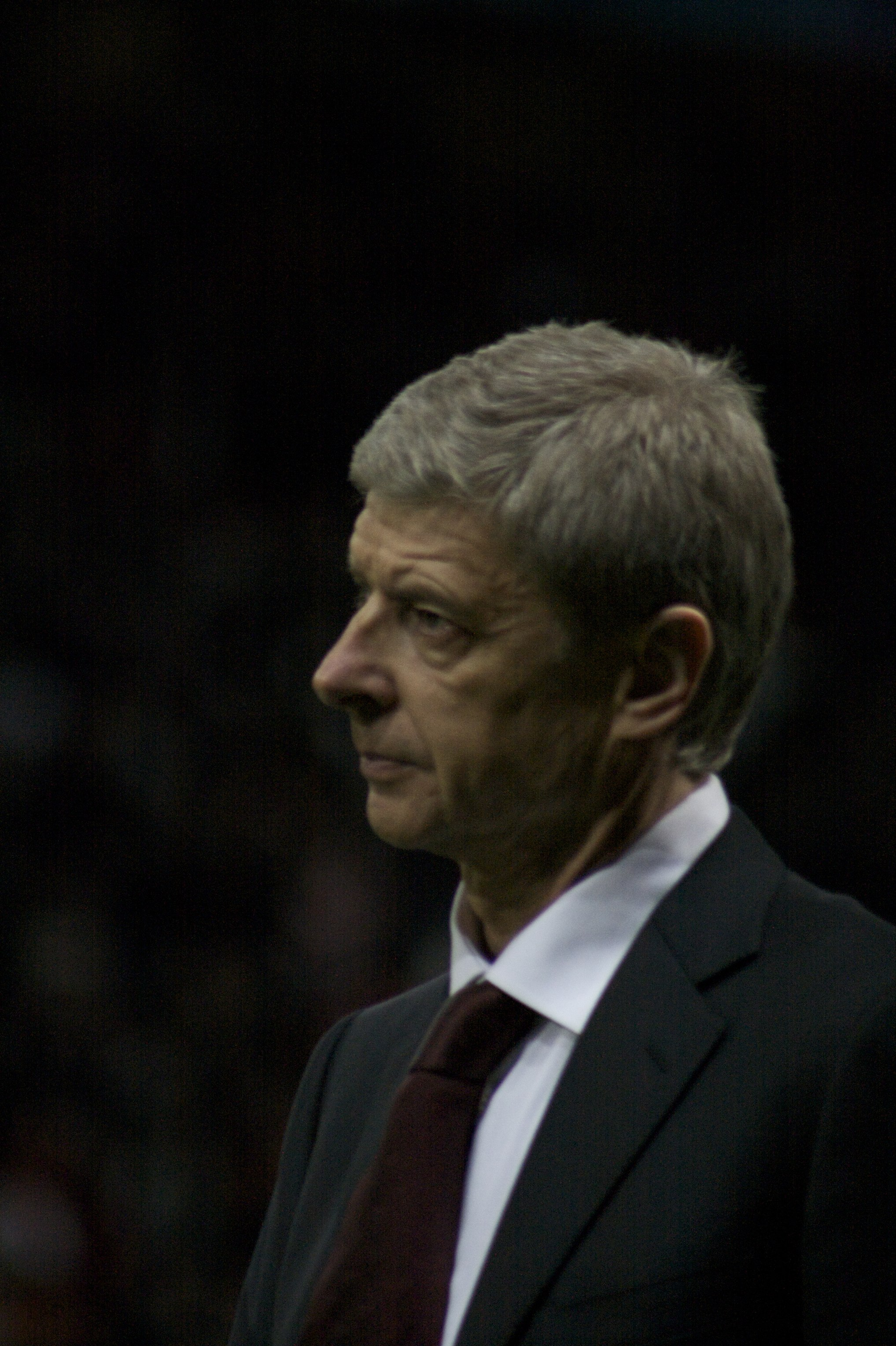
Former Arsenal manager Arsène Wenger has won the award a record four times.

Coach	Total
(France) Arsène Wenger	4
(Scotland) Alex Ferguson	3
(Spain) Pep Guardiola	3
(France) Zinedine Zidane	3
(Belgium) Raymond Goethals	2
(Netherlands) Johan Cruyff	2
(Italy) Carlo Ancelotti	2
(Spain) Luis Enrique	2
(Netherlands) Louis van Gaal	1
(France) Guy Roux	1
(Italy) Marcello Lippi	1
(France) Aimé Jacquet	1
(France) Gérard Houllier	1
(Portugal) José Mourinho	1
(Netherlands) Frank Rijkaard	1
(France) Hubert Fournier	1
(Germany) Jürgen Klopp	1

== See also ==
- The Guardian 100 Best Male Footballers in the World
- World Soccer Player of the Year
- FourFourTwo Player of the Year
- El País King of European Soccer
- ESM Team of the Season
