= Timothy Weah =

American soccer player (born 2000)

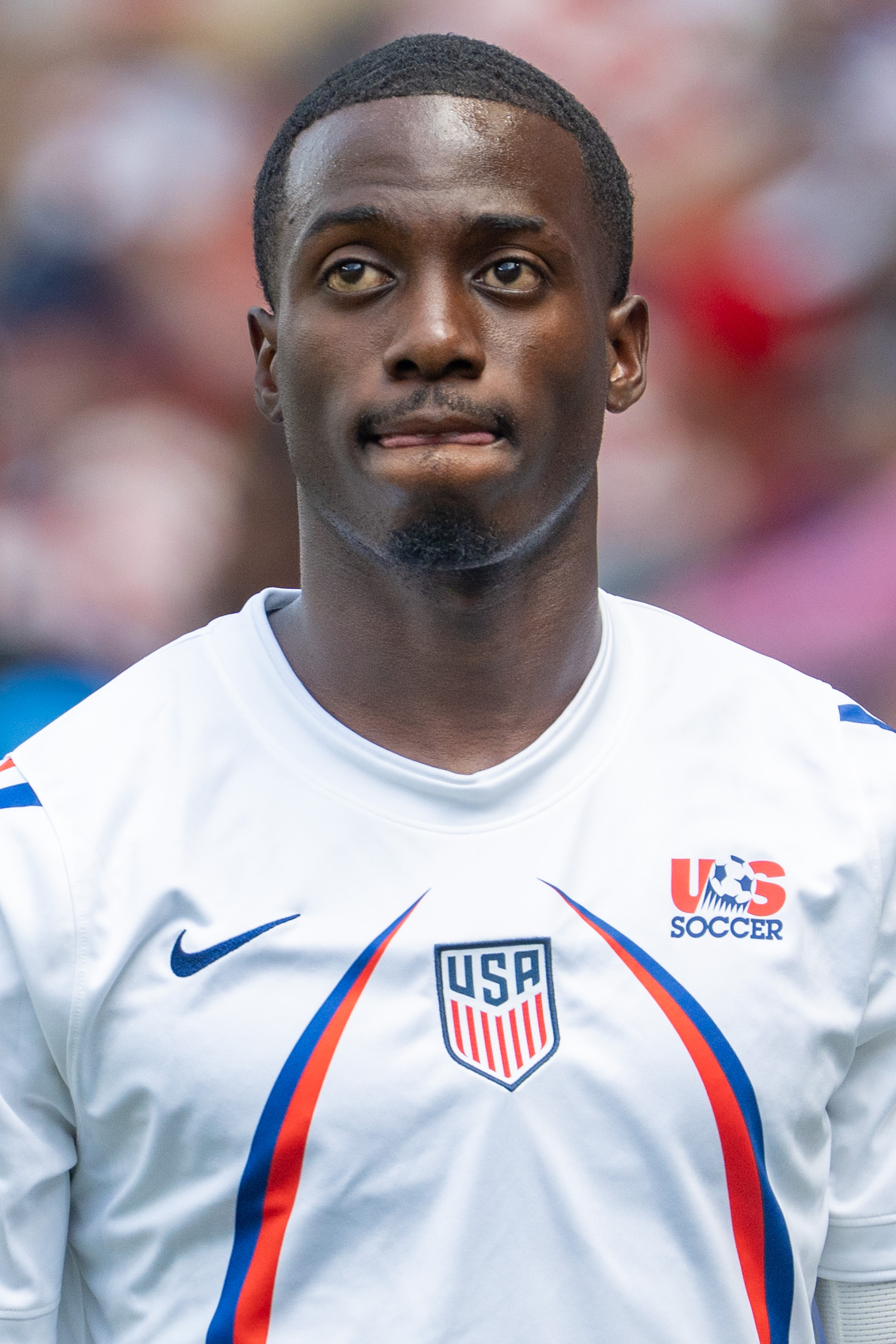
- Weah with the United States in 2026

Personal information
- Full name: Timothy Tarpeh Weah
- Date of birth: February 22, 2000 (age 26)
- Place of birth: Brooklyn, New York, U.S.
- Height: 6 ft 0 in (1.82 m)
- Positions: Winger; right-back; right wing-back

Team information
- Current team: Marseille
- Number: 22

Youth career
- –2010: West Pines United
- 2010–2013: Blau-Weiss Gottschee
- 2013–2014: New York Red Bulls
- 2014–2017: Paris Saint-Germain

Senior career*
Years	Team	Apps	(Gls)
2017–2018	Paris Saint-Germain B	15	(4)
2018–2019	Paris Saint-Germain	5	(1)
2019	→ Celtic (loan)	13	(3)
2019–2023	Lille	89	(6)
2023–2026	Juventus	60	(5)
2025–2026	→ Marseille (loan)	29	(2)
2026–	Marseille	10	(1)

International career^{‡}
2015	United States U15	6	(1)
2015–2017	United States U17	14	(6)
2019	United States U20	6	(2)
2019	United States U23	2	(0)
2018–	United States	53	(7)
Medal record
Men's soccer
Representing United States
CONCACAF Nations League
Winner	2021
Winner	2023
Winner	2024
- * Club domestic league appearances and goals as of November 22, 2026 ‡ National team caps and goals as of June 25, 2026

Timothy Tarpeh Weah (born February 22, 2000) is an American professional soccer player who plays as a winger, right-back or right wing-back for Ligue 1 club Marseille, whom he captains, and the United States national team.

Weah made his professional debut for Ligue 1 club Paris Saint-Germain in 2018, winning Ligue 1 twice and the Trophée des Champions once. He won a Scottish Premiership and Scottish Cup double on loan at Celtic in 2019. He then joined Lille, winning another Ligue 1 title and Trophée des Champions in 2021. In July 2023 he joined Serie A club Juventus and won the 2023–24 Coppa Italia.

In March 2018, Weah earned his first senior international cap for the United States. He was part of the squad that won the CONCACAF Nations League in 2021, 2023, and 2024.

Weah is the son of George Weah, the former President of Liberia, who was previously also a professional soccer player, having won the Ballon d'Or in 1995.

== Early and personal life ==
Weah was born on February 22, 2000, in Brooklyn, New York, to Liberian George Weah (at the time a professional footballer) and his Jamaican wife Clar. George Weah was elected as the 25th President of Liberia in 2018, after serving three years in the Senate of Liberia.

Weah has two older siblings, George Jr. and Tita. He spent his early life in Brooklyn, Valley Stream, New York, and Pembroke Pines, Florida. Weah is fluent in English and French and enjoys producing trap soul music. He is close friends with fellow soccer player Tyler Adams, as well as former Lille teammates Jonathan David and Angel Gomes. His cousin, Kyle Duncan, is also a professional soccer player for New York Red Bulls in Major League Soccer. He is not related to Liberian-born footballer Patrick Weah.

== Club career ==
=== Early career ===
Weah was taught soccer by his father and while in Florida played for West Pines United, before moving back to New York and joining the Rosedale Soccer Club in Queens, New York, owned by his uncle. Weah played three seasons with BW Gottschee, a team in the U.S. Soccer Development Academy system, and transferred to the New York Red Bulls Academy in 2013. He had a trial with Chelsea at the age of 13. Weah relocated to France in 2014 to join the Paris Saint-Germain Academy. In his first start with the academy team, he scored a hat-trick in an 8–1 victory for PSG over Bulgarian side Ludogorets Razgrad in the UEFA Youth League.

=== Paris Saint-Germain ===
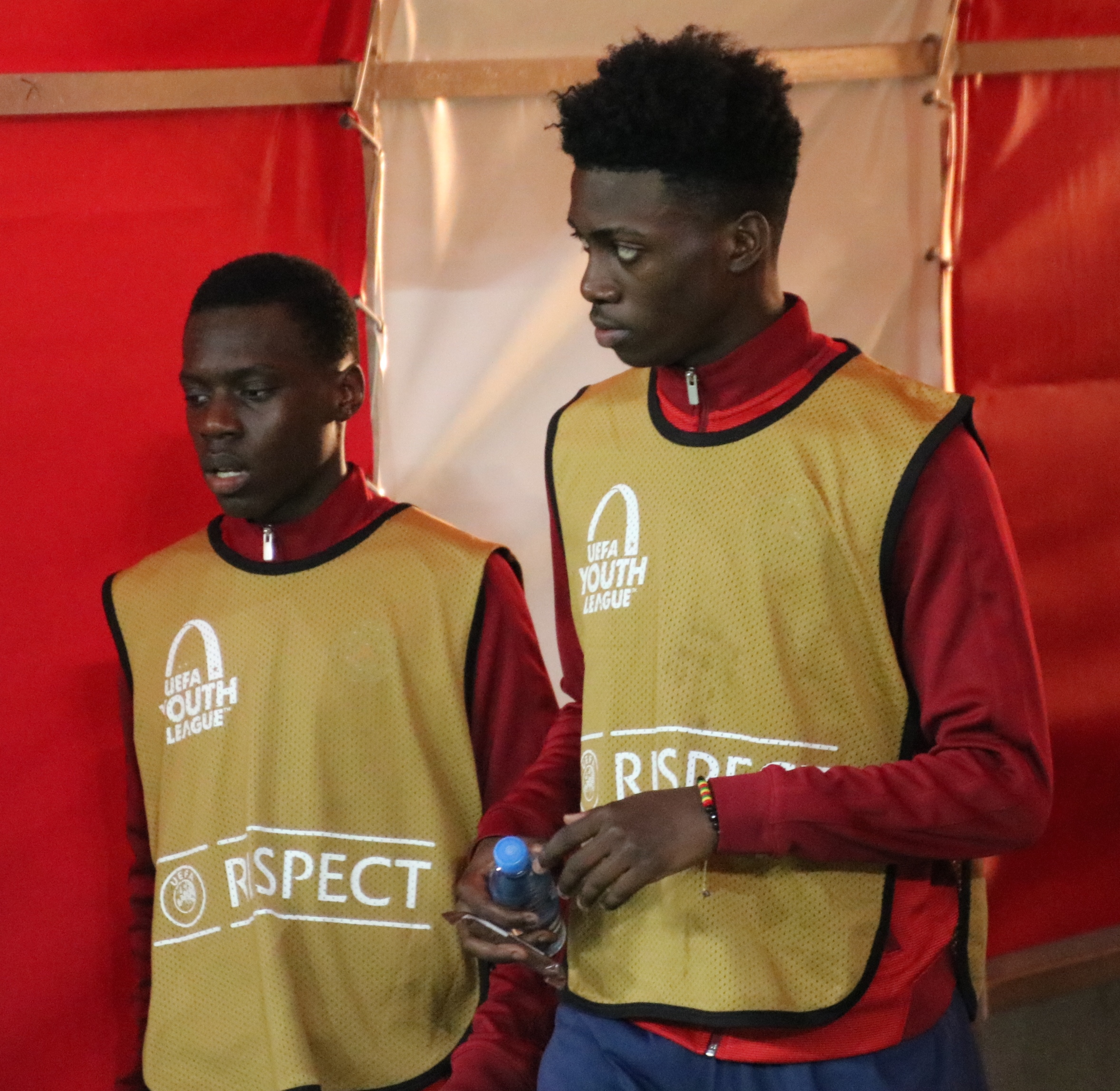
Weah (right) and Claudio Gomes with PSG at Red Bull Salzburg in the UEFA Youth League in 2017

On July 3, 2017, Weah signed a three-year professional contract with Paris Saint-Germain, the club for whom his father had played in the 1990s. He spent most of the season with the reserves in the Championnat National 2 and the under-19 squad in the UEFA Youth League.

Weah was named to the first-team squad for a Ligue 1 fixture against Troyes on March 3, 2018, while the club's starting forwards were rested for an upcoming Champions League match. He came on as a substitute in the 79th minute of the match and had a goal-scoring opportunity in stoppage time that was saved by the Troyes goalkeeper. Weah made his first start for Paris Saint-Germain in a 0–0 draw against Caen on the last day of the Ligue 1 season. Weah scored his first competitive goal for PSG during a 4–0 win against Monaco in the Trophée des Champions on August 4, 2018. He scored his first league goal a week later in the club's season opener, a 3–0 win over Caen.

He joined Celtic on a six-month loan on January 7, 2019, and said that he was "in love" with the club. He made his debut on January 19 as a 69th-minute substitute for Scott Sinclair in a Scottish Cup fourth round match at home to Airdrieonians and scored in a 3–0 win. Weah's second goal for Celtic, and his first in the league, came in a 4–0 victory over St Mirren on January 23. In February 2019 he was added to Celtic's Europa League squad. With Celtic, he won the Scottish Premiership and the team advanced to the Scottish Cup final. Weah's loan spell at Celtic was terminated early by the club in May after he was selected to the US squad for the Under-20 World Cup, causing him to miss the Scottish Cup final.

=== Lille ===
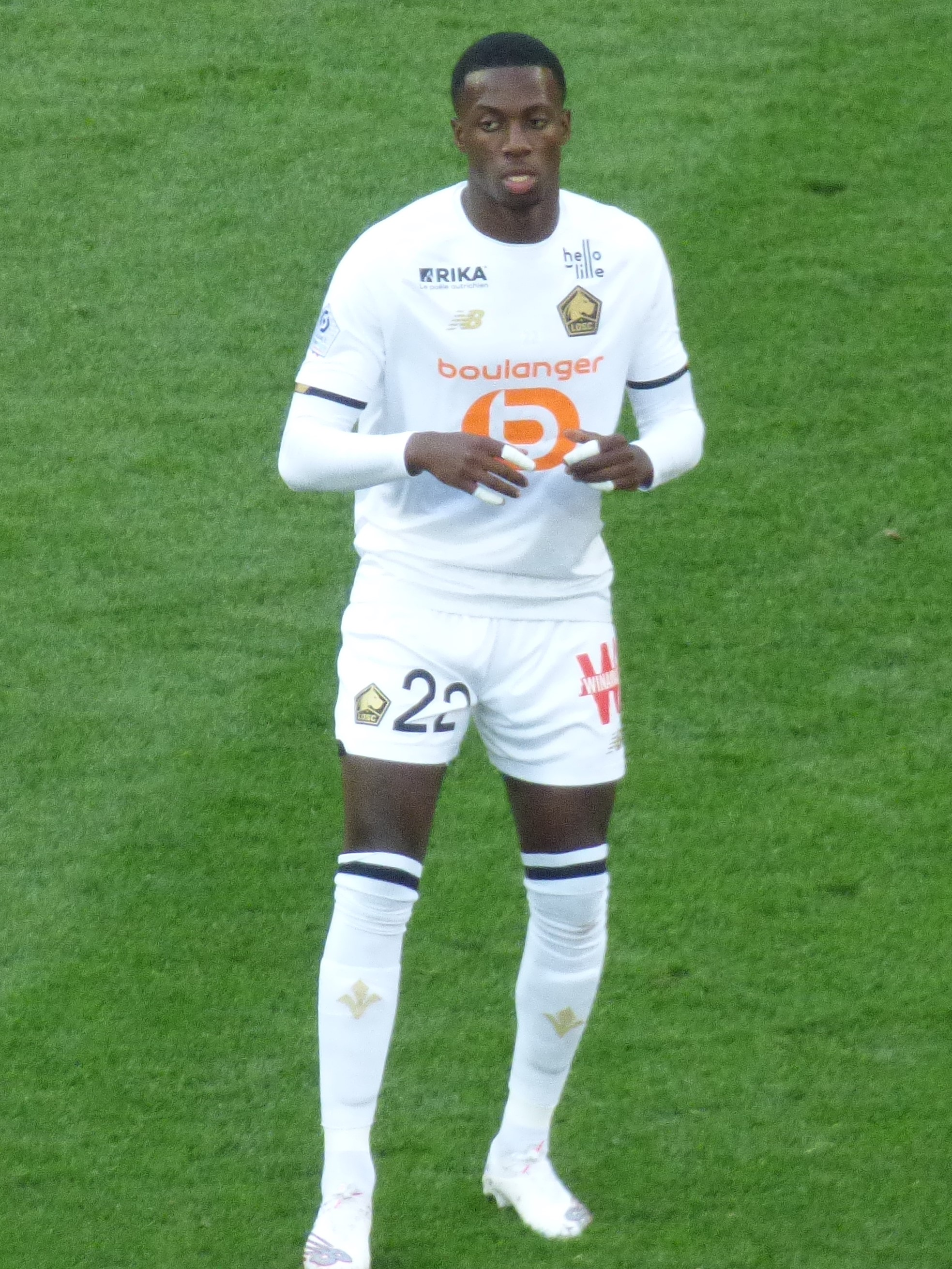
Weah playing for Lille in 2021

On June 29, 2019, Weah signed a five-year contract with Lille, starting on July 1. The undisclosed fee was reported by L'Équipe to be €10 million ($11.37 million). He made his debut on August 11, starting in a 2–1 home win over Nantes. He played 68 minutes before being substituted for Yusuf Yazıcı. Weah made three appearances for Lille throughout the 2019–20 season, but he missed most of the season due to injury; Weah suffered two hamstring injuries that kept him out of the bulk of the Ligue 1 season. The first injury occurred in a game against Amiens, keeping him out for six months, then the second occurred during his first match back with the team in a game against Marseille. His injury was successfully operated in March 2020 by surgeon Lasse Lempainen in Turku, Finland.

Weah made his return from injury during the 2020–21 Ligue 1 season, during Lille's second match of the season. He came on in the 79th minute of the game against Reims for Burak Yılmaz and played 16 minutes. On the next Europa League matchday, Weah started and scored his first goal for Lille in a 3–2 loss against his former club Celtic. On December 16, he came on as a substitute against Dijon and scored his first Ligue 1 goal for Lille, capping off a 2–0 victory. He played 28 games and scored three goals as Les Dogues won their first league title for a decade. On August 1, the team won the 2021 Trophée des Champions 1–0 against PSG in Israel, with Weah playing the last 14 minutes in place of Jonathan David.

On March 19, 2022, Weah was sent off in a 1–0 win at Nantes for a foul on Samuel Moutoussamy, who required assistance to leave the field. He did not score until May 14 in the penultimate league fixture, a 3–1 win at Nice and followed it a week later with both goals of a home 2–2 tie with Rennes.

=== Juventus ===
Following four seasons with the French side, Weah signed for Serie A club Juventus on July 1, 2023, on a five-year contract running until June 30, 2028. The financial details of the transfer include an initial and base fee of €10.3 million ($11.22 million) payable to Lille in two years, a maximum of €2.1 million ($2.29 million) add-ons depending on sporting conditions, and €1 million ($1.09 million) of incidental charges.

On January 4, 2024, Weah scored his first goal for Juventus in a 6–1 win against Salernitana in the round of 16 stage of the Coppa Italia. Juventus went on to win the Coppa Italia, beating Atalanta in the final.

==== Marseille loan ====
On August 6, 2025, Weah signed for Ligue 1 club Olympique Marseille on loan, with an obligation to buy for a fee that could reach €18 million ($21 million).

=== Marseille ===
On June 8, 2026, Weah joined Marseille on a permanent deal, signing a contract until 2030. He was later made captain on August 20, 2026.

== International career ==
In addition to the United States, Weah was eligible to represent France, Jamaica, and Liberia, through residency and his parents' citizenships. Weah stated that his decision to represent the United States "wasn't hard at all" and was based on his love of the country and his teammates.

=== Youth ===
Weah has represented the United States on several youth national teams, beginning with a call-up to train with the under-14 team in 2012. Weah was selected to join the under-15 team at the Tournament delle Nazioni in Italy, scoring the winning goal in the final against Austria.

He was called up to the under-17 team, under the management of former under-15 coach John Hackworth, in December 2015 for a series of friendlies in Florida. Weah joined the team for the Montaigu Tournament, which the United States won after he scored in the final against hosts France. At another set of friendlies in Florida, Weah made three substitute appearances and scored twice. He was part of the under-17 squad that finished second in the 2017 CONCACAF U-17 Championship, scoring two goals.

He was selected to represent the United States at the 2017 FIFA Under-17 World Cup in India. In the team's first knockout stage match, Weah scored a hat-trick in a 5–0 victory over Paraguay. The hat-trick was the first one recorded by a United States men's national team player at any level during the knockout stages of a World Cup and the fifth overall for any American male player at a World Cup.

Weah was named in the United States squad for the 2019 FIFA Under-20 World Cup in Poland. He scored twice during the tournament, against Qatar in the group stage to qualify for the knockout stage and against Ecuador in their quarterfinal defeat.

=== Senior ===
Weah made his full debut for the senior national team in a 1–0 friendly win against Paraguay on March 27, 2018, entering the match as a substitute for fellow debutant Marky Delgado in the 86th minute. He was the first player born in the 2000s to earn a senior cap for the United States. During a friendly against Bolivia on May 28, 2018, his first international start, Weah scored his first international goal and became the fourth-youngest player to score for the United States, ahead of Josh Sargent, who scored his first earlier in the match.

On June 6, 2021, Weah came on as a 60th-minute substitute for Sergiño Dest in a 3–2 overtime win over Mexico in the CONCACAF Nations League Final at Mile High Stadium in Denver. He scored his first competitive international goal on November 16, opening a 1–1 tie away to Jamaica in 2022 FIFA World Cup qualification. He was part of the squad that reached the last 16 of the final tournament in Qatar, scoring against Wales in the 1–1 tie in the first group game.

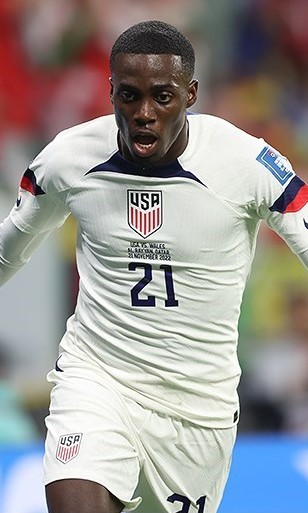
Weah with the United States at the 2022 FIFA World Cup.

Weah was included in the American squad for the 2024 Copa América hosted on home soil. In their second group stage match against Panama, he was sent off with a straight red card (upgraded from a yellow card following a VAR review) after striking Panamanian defender Roderick Miller in the head. The U.S. eventually lost the match 2–1. Afterward, Weah along with teammates Folarin Balogun, Chris Richards and Weston McKennie all suffered racist abuse.

Ahead of the 2026 FIFA World Cup, Weah said he was "disappointed" in ticket prices at the tournament and that he believed that it would be "more of a show" and that "real fans will miss matches" due to the pricing. The comments prompted United States head coach Mauricio Pochettino to respond, saying it was not Weah's "duty to evaluate the price of the ticket" and praise FIFA, adding that it was not his or Weah's place "to provide our opinion" about FIFA's decisions.

On May 26, 2026, Weah was selected in the 26-man squad for the 2026 FIFA World Cup.

== Club ownership ==
On May 28, 2024, the American second-division women's club Brooklyn FC announced that Weah had joined its ownership group.

== Career statistics ==
=== Club ===
As of match played November 8, 2026

Appearances and goals by club, season and competition
Club	Season	League			National cup (Note: Includes Scottish Cup, Coupe de France, Coppa Italia)		Continental		Other		Total	
Club	Season	Division	Apps	Goals	Apps	Goals	Apps	Goals	Apps	Goals	Apps	Goals
Paris Saint-Germain II	2017–18	Championnat National 1	12	2	–		–		–		12	2
Paris Saint-Germain II	2018–19	Championnat National 1	3	2	–		–		–		3	2
Paris Saint-Germain II	Total		15	4	–		–		–		15	4
Paris Saint-Germain	2017–18	Ligue 1	3	0	0	0	0	0	0	0	3	0
Paris Saint-Germain	2018–19	Ligue 1	2	1	0	0	0	0	1 (Note: Appearance in Trophée des Champions)	1	3	2
Paris Saint-Germain	Total		5	1	–		–		1	1	6	2
Celtic (loan)	2018–19	Scottish Premiership	13	3	3	1	1 (Note: Appearance(s) in UEFA Europa League)	0	–		17	4
Lille	2019–20	Ligue 1	3	0	0	0	0	0	0	0	3	0
Lille	2020–21	Ligue 1	28	3	3	0	6	2	–		37	5
Lille	2021–22	Ligue 1	29	3	0	0	5 (Note: Appearances in UEFA Champions League)	0	1	0	35	3
Lille	2022–23	Ligue 1	29	0	3	0	–		–		32	0
Lille	Total		89	6	6	0	11	2	1	0	107	8
Juventus	2023–24	Serie A	30	0	5	1	–		–		35	1
Juventus	2024–25	Serie A	30	5	2	0	9	1	2 (Note: One appearance in Supercoppa Italiana, one appearance in FIFA Club World Cup)	0	43	6
Juventus	Total		60	5	7	1	9	1	2	0	78	7
Marseille (loan)	2025–26	Ligue 1	29	2	4	0	7	1	1	0	41	3
Marseille	2026–27	Ligue 1	9	1	0	0	4	0	—		13	1
Marseille	Marseille total		38	3	4	0	9	1	1	0	54	4
Career total			221	22	20	2	32	4	5	1	278	29

=== International ===
As of match played June 25, 2026

Appearances and goals by national team and year
National team	Year	Apps	Goals
United States	2018	8	1
United States	2019	0	0
United States	2020	2	0
United States	2021	8	1
United States	2022	11	2
United States	2023	6	1
United States	2024	7	2
United States	2025	5	0
United States	2026	6	0
Total		53	7

Scores and results list the United States' goal tally first, score column indicates score after each Weah goal.

List of international goals scored by Timothy Weah
No.	Date	Venue	Opponent	Score	Result	Competition
1	May 28, 2018	Talen Energy Stadium, Chester, United States	Bolivia	3–0	3–0	Friendly
2	November 16, 2021	Independence Park, Kingston, Jamaica	Jamaica	1–0	1–1	2022 FIFA World Cup qualification
3	June 1, 2022	TQL Stadium, Cincinnati, United States	Morocco	2–0	3–0	Friendly
4	November 21, 2022	Ahmad bin Ali Stadium, Al Rayyan, Qatar	Wales	1–0	1–1	2022 FIFA World Cup
5	September 9, 2023	CityPark, St. Louis, United States	Uzbekistan	1–0	3–0	Friendly
6	June 8, 2024	Commanders Field, Landover, United States	Colombia	1–2	1–5	Friendly
7	November 18, 2024	CityPark, St. Louis, United States	Jamaica	4–1	4–2	2024–25 CONCACAF Nations League A

== Honors ==
Paris Saint-Germain

- Ligue 1: 2017–18, 2018–19
- Trophée des Champions: 2018

Celtic

- Scottish Premiership: 2018–19
- Scottish Cup: 2018–19

Lille

- Ligue 1: 2020–21
- Trophée des Champions: 2021

Juventus

- Coppa Italia: 2023–24

United States U17

- CONCACAF U-17 Championship runner-up: 2017

United States

- CONCACAF Nations League: 2019–20, 2022–23, 2023–24
