= Clar Weah =

First Lady of Liberia from 2018 to 2024

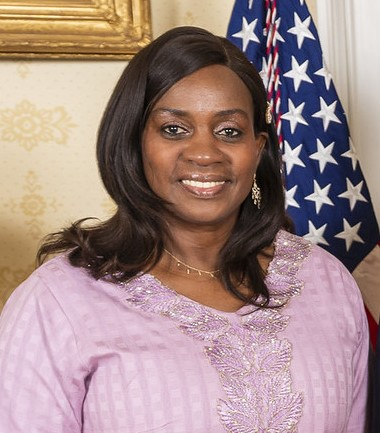
- Weah in 2022

First Lady of Liberia
- In role 22 January 2018 – 22 January 2024
- President: George Weah
- Preceded by: Nettie Blah
- Succeeded by: Katumu Boakai

Personal details
- Born: Clar Marie Duncan; 11 March 1965 (age 61) Kingston, Jamaica
- Party: Congress for Democratic Change
- Spouse: George Weah (m. 1993)
- Children: Martha Weah, George Weah Jr, Timothy Weah

Clar Marie Duncan Weah (née Duncan; born 11 March 1965) is a Jamaican-American businesswoman, philanthropist and advocate who was the first lady of Liberia from 2018 to 2024. She is married to George Weah, the 25th President of Liberia. Clar established the Clar Hope Foundation in 2018, with the goal of improving the livelihoods of the least privileged in Liberia.

== Biography ==
=== Early life and career ===
Clar Marie Duncan was born in Kingston, Jamaica, and is the youngest of seven children. In her early youth, she migrated along with her family to the United States. In the United States, she attended the City University of New York and earned her nursing license and a bachelor's degree in Health Sciences. She launched her career working as a customer service representative in New York at both Citibank and Chase Manhattan Bank, during which time she, in conjunction, managed small businesses.

She later pursued her studies leading her to a nursing career. She worked at Jamaica Hospital in New York City.

=== Marriage and children ===
Clar married George Weah on 26 June 1993, and have three children – Martha Weah, George Weah Jr., and Timothy Weah. Their sons are international football players.

== First Lady of Liberia (2018–2024) ==
Following the election of her husband as the 25th President of Liberia, Weah started her role as the First Lady of the Republic of Liberia. She set out to develop programs and social projects that encompass services targeting the assistance of orphans, street children, the elderly, women, and girls, with a focus on rural settings.

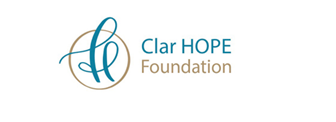

In 2018, the Clar Hope Foundation was founded as a non-political initiative. The foundation aims to assist disadvantaged children, youth and women. Its objectives focus on delivering essential educational and emergency healthcare as a universal and constitutional health-right to every Liberian citizen.

The Clar Hope Foundation came from the merger of sustainable development solutions.

In June 2019, President Weah launched Clar Weah's flagship initiative, the "She's You" movement. According to its mission statement, it aims to advance gender equality through the promotion of women's empowerment and fight to end all forms of violence and detrimental practices against women, girls, and children. The She's You movement objectives are to create a conducive environment for women and girls to live free of violence, rape, gender inequalities At the launch of "She's You", President Weah disclosed that on his wife's initiative, the new home for the elderly in Grand Bassa County was almost ready for use.

In September 2020, at the launch of the Liberian Anti-SGBV Conference, Clar Weah reiterated that there was no excuse for rape in her country. She explained that despite her efforts with the Ministry of Gender, Children and Social Protection, sexual and gender based violence continued. "But with all our efforts," she explained, "SGBV persists. It is sickening to hear children as young as 10 years old are being raped." She cited improved awareness of SGBV and the education of men and boys as priorities for reducing threats of violence again women.

== Honours ==
Weah was appointed in March 2018, at a Women Symposium in Morocco, Ambassador and Champion for Women's Football, by the Confederation of African Football.

Weah was appointed a Merck Foundation ''More than a Mother'' Ambassador to Liberia.
