= Onze Mondial =

French football magazine

- Founded: 1976

Onze Mondial (World Eleven) is a French language quarterly football magazine published in Paris, France.

== History and profile ==
The magazine was established with name Onze in 1976. In 1989 the magazine merged with another sports magazine, Mondial, and began to use its current name, Onze Mondial.

The magazine is published on a quarterly basis in Paris. It was previously published monthly by Lagardère Active. In May 2013 the magazine ceased publication when it went bankrupt. Sporteam Media SAS, a subsidiary of MenInvestMedia, bought it in October 2013 and the magazine was relaunched in November of the same year.

Every year, Onze Mondial hands out the European Footballer of the Year (Onze d'Or) award, as well as awards for coaches.

In 2014 Onze Mondial had a circulation of 20,954 copies.
