= 1995 Ballon d'Or =

Annual association football award event in France

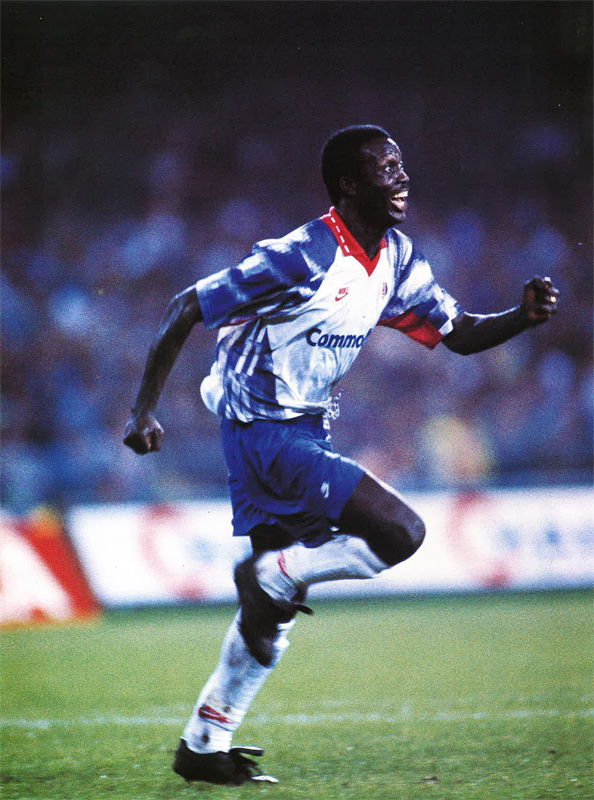
- 1995 Ballon d'Or winner, George Weah
- Date: 24 December 1995
- Presented by: France Football

Highlights
- Won by: (Liberia) George Weah (1st award)
- Website: ballondor.com

The 1995 Ballon d'Or, given to the best football player in Europe as judged by a panel of sports journalists from UEFA member countries, was awarded to George Weah on 24 December 1995. It was the first edition of this award where players born outside Europe were allowed to receive votes and was the first time a player representing an African nation won the award.

== Rankings ==
Rank	Player	Club(s)	Nationality	Points
1	George Weah	(France) Paris Saint-Germain (Italy) Milan	Liberia	144
2	Jürgen Klinsmann	(England) Tottenham Hotspur (Germany) Bayern Munich	Germany	108
3	Jari Litmanen	(Netherlands) Ajax	Finland	67
4	Alessandro Del Piero	(Italy) Juventus	Italy	57
5	Patrick Kluivert	(Netherlands) Ajax	Netherlands	47
6	Gianfranco Zola	(Italy) Parma	Italy	41
7	Paolo Maldini	(Italy) Milan	Italy	36
8	Marc Overmars	(Netherlands) Ajax	Netherlands	33
9	Matthias Sammer	(Germany) Borussia Dortmund	Germany	18
10	Michael Laudrup	(Spain) Real Madrid	Denmark	17
11	Marcel Desailly	(Italy) Milan	France	16
12	Frank Rijkaard	(Netherlands) Ajax	Netherlands	15
12	Fabrizio Ravanelli	(Italy) Juventus	Italy	15
14	Paulo Sousa	(Italy) Juventus	Portugal	14
14	Hristo Stoichkov	(Italy) Parma	Bulgaria	14
16	Dejan Savićević	(Italy) Milan	Yugoslavia	12
17	Davor Šuker	(Spain) Sevilla	Croatia	10
18	Fernando Hierro	(Spain) Real Madrid	Spain	9
19	Gianluca Vialli	(Italy) Juventus	Italy	8
20	Gabriel Batistuta	(Italy) Fiorentina	Argentina	7
21	Franco Baresi	(Italy) Milan	Italy	6
21	Finidi George	(Netherlands) Ajax	Nigeria	6
23	Roberto Baggio	(Italy) Juventus	Italy	5
23	Tony Yeboah	(England) Leeds United	Ghana	5
23	Zvonimir Boban	(Italy) Milan	Croatia	5
26	Ronaldo	(Netherlands) PSV Eindhoven	Brazil	4
27	Juan Esnáider	(Spain) Zaragoza (Spain) Real Madrid	Argentina	3
27	Iván Zamorano	(Spain) Real Madrid	Chile	3
27	Andreas Möller	(Germany) Borussia Dortmund	Germany	3
30	Vítor Baía	(Portugal) Porto	Portugal	2
30	Bebeto	(Spain) Deportivo La Coruña	Brazil	2
32	Alan Shearer	(England) Blackburn Rovers	England	1
32	Luís Figo	(Spain) Barcelona	Portugal	1
32	Ian Wright	(England) Arsenal	England	1

Additionally, sixteen players were nominated but received no votes: Daniel Amokachi (Everton & Nigeria), Dino Baggio (Parma & Italy), Abel Balbo (Roma & Argentina), Mario Basler (Werder Bremen & Germany), Júlio César (Borussia Dortmund & Brazil), Didier Deschamps (Juventus & France), Donato Gama (Deportivo La Coruña & Spain), Stefan Effenberg (Borussia Mönchengladbach & Germany), Vincent Guérin (Paris Saint-Germain & France), Christian Karembeu (Nantes/Sampdoria & France), Bernard Lama (Paris Saint-Germain & France), Japhet N'Doram (Nantes & Chad), Jay-Jay Okocha (Eintracht Frankfurt & Nigeria), Fernando Redondo (Real Madrid & Argentina), Peter Schmeichel (Manchester United & Denmark) and Clarence Seedorf (Ajax/Sampdoria & Netherlands).
