= George Weah Jr. =

American soccer player (born 1987)

Personal information
- Date of birth: August 27, 1987 (age 39)
- Place of birth: Monrovia, Liberia
- Height: 5 ft 10 in (1.78 m)
- Position: Midfielder

Youth career
- 2003–2007: AC Milan

Senior career*
Years	Team	Apps	(Gls)
2010	Wohlen	10	(0)
2010	FC Meisterschwanden	8	(2)
2010–2011	Baden	11	(3)
2011–2012	Wangen bei Olten	8	(0)
2012	Kaliakra Kavarna	12	(0)
2013	Lausanne-Sport II	3	(1)
2015	Paris Saint-Germain B	2	(0)
2016	Tours II	4	(0)
2018	La Chaux-de-Fonds	10	(1)
Total		68	(7)

International career
2004	United States U20	2	(2)
- * Club domestic league appearances and goals

George Weah Jr. (born August 27, 1987) is a former professional soccer player who most recently played as a midfielder for La Chaux-de-Fonds. He is the son of former Ballon d'Or winner and president of Liberia George Weah. Born in Liberia, he represented the United States at youth level.

== Early life ==
Weah is the son of Ballon d'Or winner and former Liberian president George Weah and Jamaican-born wife Clar Weah. He was born in Liberia but raised in the United States. He was one of three Weah children to show an aptitude and interest in soccer at a young age. While his sister Tita chose to return to school studies, both he and his brother Tim pursued professional careers.

== Club career ==
Weah began his career in the youth team of AC Milan at the age of 14 but was released in 2007 after long series of injuries shortly prior to turning 20. In October of that year, he joined Slavia Prague on trial, but he was not offered a contract. Coach Karel Jarolím explained that the team were looking for a "different type of player" than Weah.

Weah briefly played for CS Romontois in Switzerland before moving within the country to Wohlen. In 2011, Weah joined Baden. On February 3, 2012, Weah joined Bulgarian club Kaliakra Kavarna on a one-and-a-half-year deal after a successful trial.

On May 17, 2014, Weah made his debut for Paris Saint-Germain's reserve team in the Championnat de France Amateur, coming on as an 87th-minute substitute in 2–0 defeat to Lens II. He went on to play two games in total for the PSG reserve side.

== International career ==
When he was active, Weah was eligible to represent both the United States and Liberia. He played in two friendlies for the United States under-20 side in 2004. More than a decade later, he was called up by the Liberian senior side for a 2017 Africa Cup of Nations qualification match against Togo in June 2015, despite not having played for a club in nearly a year. He was named to the bench as Liberia lost 2–1.
