= 2016 CAF Confederation Cup qualifying rounds =

- Dates: 12 February – 18 May 2016

The 2016 CAF Confederation Cup qualifying rounds were played from 12 February to 18 May 2016. A total of 59 teams competed in the international football qualifying rounds to decide the eight places in the group stage of the 2016 CAF Confederation Cup.

== Draw ==
The draw for the preliminary, first and second rounds was held on 11 December 2015 in Dakar, Senegal.

The entry round of the 55 teams entered into the draw was determined by their performances in the CAF competitions for the previous five seasons (CAF 5-year ranking points shown in parentheses).

Entry round	First round	Preliminary round
Teams	(Tunisia) Espérance de Tunis (35 pts); (Morocco) FUS Rabat (3 pts); (Sudan) Al-Ahly Shendi (2 pts); (Egypt) ENPPI; (Democratic Republic of the Congo) CS Don Bosco; (Algeria) CS Constantine; (Ghana) Medeama; (Zambia) Zanaco; (Gabon) CF Mounana; (Guinea) AS Kaloum; (Liberia) Barrack Young Controllers II; (Mozambique) Liga Desportiva de Maputo; (Tanzania) Azam	(Tunisia) Stade Gabèsien; (Egypt) Misr Lel Makkasa; (Democratic Republic of the Congo) FC Saint-Éloi Lupopo; (Algeria) MC Oran; (Sudan) Khartoum; (Ivory Coast) SC Gagnoa; (Ivory Coast) Africa Sports; (Morocco) Kawkab Marrakech; (Cameroon) New Star de Douala; (Cameroon) UMS de Loum; (Republic of the Congo) Vita Club Mokanda; (Republic of the Congo) Diables Noirs; (Mali) USFAS Bamako; (Mali) AS Bakaridjan; (Nigeria) Nasarawa United; (Nigeria) Akwa United; (South Africa) Bidvest Wits; (South Africa) Ajax Cape Town; (Angola) Sagrada Esperança; (Libya) Al-Ittihad Tripoli; (Ethiopia) Defence Force; (Niger) AS SONIDEP; (Zimbabwe) Harare City; (Botswana) Gaborone United; (Burkina Faso) USFA; (Burundi) Atlético Olympic; (Chad) Renaissance; (Comoros) Fomboni Club; (Equatorial Guinea) Deportivo Mongomo; (The Gambia) Wallidan; (Kenya) Bandari; (Madagascar) AS Adema; (Rwanda) Police; (Senegal) Génération Foot; (Seychelles) Light Stars; (South Sudan) Atlabara; (Uganda) SC Villa; (Zanzibar) JKU

== Format ==
In the qualifying rounds, each tie was played on a home-and-away two-legged basis. If the aggregate score was tied after the second leg, the away goals rule would be applied, and if still tied, extra time would not be played, and the penalty shoot-out would be used to determine the winner (Regulations III. 13 & 14).

== Schedule ==
The schedule of each round was as follows.

Round	First leg	Second leg
Preliminary round	12–14 February 2016	26–28 February 2016
First round	11–13 March 2016	18–20 March 2016
Second round	8–10 April 2016	19–20 April 2016
Play-off round	6–8 May 2016	17–18 May 2016

== Bracket ==
The eight winners of the second round advanced to the play-off round, where they were joined by the eight losers of the Champions League second round.

Preliminary round
(Republic of the Congo) Vita Club Mokanda (p)	0	1	1 (6)
(Nigeria) Akwa United	1	0	1 (5)
(Rwanda) Police	3	1	4
(South Sudan) Atlabara	1	2	3
(Angola) Sagrada Esperança	1	2	3
(South Africa) Ajax Cape Town	2	0	2
(Mozambique) Liga Desportiva de Maputo	—	—	—
Bye	—	—	—

First round
(Republic of the Congo) Vita Club Mokanda	0	1	1
(Rwanda) Police	0	0	0
(Angola) Sagrada Esperança	1	1	2
(Mozambique) Liga Desportiva de Maputo	0	1	1

Second round
(Republic of the Congo) Vita Club Mokanda	1	0	1
(Angola) Sagrada Esperança	2	2	4

Preliminary round
(The Gambia) Wallidan	—	—	—
(Algeria) MC Oran (w/o)	—	—	—
(Ivory Coast) SC Gagnoa	2	0	2
(Mali) USFAS Bamako	0	0	0
(Morocco) Kawkab Marrakech (p)	3	0	3 (5)
(Burkina Faso) USFA	0	3	3 (4)
(Liberia) Barrack Young Controllers II	—	—	—
Bye	—	—	—

First round
(Algeria) MC Oran	2	2	4
(Ivory Coast) SC Gagnoa	0	2	2
(Morocco) Kawkab Marrakech	3	0	3
(Liberia) Barrack Young Controllers II	0	2	2

Second round
(Algeria) MC Oran	0	0	0
(Morocco) Kawkab Marrakech	0	1	1

Preliminary round
(Seychelles) Light Stars	0	0	0
(South Africa) Bidvest Wits	3	6	9
(Tanzania) Azam	—	—	—
Bye	—	—	—
(Chad) Renaissance	1	2	3
(Cameroon) New Star de Douala	0	2	2
(Tunisia) Espérance de Tunis	—	—	—
Bye	—	—	—

First round
(South Africa) Bidvest Wits	0	3	3
(Tanzania) Azam	3	4	7
(Chad) Renaissance	0	0	0
(Tunisia) Espérance de Tunis	2	5	7

Second round
(Tanzania) Azam	2	0	2
(Tunisia) Espérance de Tunis	1	3	4

Preliminary round
(Zimbabwe) Harare City	3	3	6
(Madagascar) AS Adema	2	1	3
(Zambia) Zanaco	—	—	—
Bye	—	—	—
(Mali) AS Bakaridjan	1	1	2 (3)
(Tunisia) Stade Gabèsien (p)	1	1	2 (4)
(Guinea) AS Kaloum	—	—	—
Bye	—	—	—

First round
(Zimbabwe) Harare City	1	1	2
(Zambia) Zanaco	2	3	5
(Tunisia) Stade Gabèsien	2	0	2
(Guinea) AS Kaloum	1	0	1

Second round
(Zambia) Zanaco	1	0	1
(Tunisia) Stade Gabèsien	1	3	4

Preliminary round
(Nigeria) Nasarawa United	2	0	2
(Senegal) Génération Foot	1	0	1
(Algeria) CS Constantine	—	—	—
Bye	—	—	—
(Ethiopia) Defence Force	1	0	1
(Egypt) Misr Lel Makkasa	3	3	6
(Democratic Republic of the Congo) CS Don Bosco	—	—	—
Bye	—	—	—

First round
(Nigeria) Nasarawa United	1	1	2
(Algeria) CS Constantine	0	4	4
(Egypt) Misr Lel Makkasa	3	0	3
(Democratic Republic of the Congo) CS Don Bosco	1	1	2

Second round
(Algeria) CS Constantine	1	1	2
(Egypt) Misr Lel Makkasa	0	3	3

Preliminary round
(Democratic Republic of the Congo) FC Saint-Éloi Lupopo	2	1	3
(Kenya) Bandari	0	1	1
(Sudan) Al-Ahly Shendi	—	—	—
Bye	—	—	—
(Libya) Al-Ittihad Tripoli	4	1	5
(Niger) AS SONIDEP	1	3	4
(Ghana) Medeama	—	—	—
Bye	—	—	—

First round
(Democratic Republic of the Congo) FC Saint-Éloi Lupopo	2	0	2
(Sudan) Al-Ahly Shendi (a)	1	1	2
(Libya) Al-Ittihad Tripoli	1	0	1
(Ghana) Medeama	0	2	2

Second round
(Sudan) Al-Ahly Shendi	0	0	0
(Ghana) Medeama	0	2	2

Preliminary round
(Cameroon) UMS de Loum (w/o)	0	0	0 (2)
(Equatorial Guinea) Deportivo Mongomo (p) (d/q)	0	0	0 (4)
(Morocco) FUS Rabat	—	—	—
Bye	—	—	—
(Sudan) Khartoum	0	0	0
(Uganda) SC Villa	1	1	2
(Zanzibar) JKU (w/o)	—	—	—
(Botswana) Gaborone United	—	—	—

First round
(Cameroon) UMS de Loum	1	1	2
(Morocco) FUS Rabat	1	2	3
(Uganda) SC Villa	4	1	5
(Zanzibar) JKU	0	0	0

Second round
(Morocco) FUS Rabat	7	0	7
(Uganda) SC Villa	0	1	1

Preliminary round
(Comoros) Fomboni Club	1	0	1
(Burundi) Atlético Olympic	0	2	2
(Gabon) CF Mounana	—	—	—
Bye	—	—	—
(Republic of the Congo) Diables Noirs	1	1	2
(Ivory Coast) Africa Sports	2	2	4
(Egypt) ENPPI	—	—	—
Bye	—	—	—

First round
(Burundi) Atlético Olympic	0	0	0
(Gabon) CF Mounana	2	3	5
(Ivory Coast) Africa Sports	0	1	1
(Egypt) ENPPI	2	4	6

Second round
(Gabon) CF Mounana (p)	2	0	2 (5)
(Egypt) ENPPI	0	2	2 (4)

== Preliminary round ==
The preliminary round included the 38 teams that did not receive byes to the first round.

Team 1	Agg.	Team 2	1st leg	2nd leg
Vita Club Mokanda (Republic of the Congo)	1–1 (6–5 p)	(Nigeria) Akwa United	0–1	1–0
Police (Rwanda)	4–3	(South Sudan) Atlabara	3–1	1–2
Sagrada Esperança (Angola)	3–2	(South Africa) Ajax Cape Town	1–2	2–0
Wallidan (The Gambia)	w/o	(Algeria) MC Oran	—	—
SC Gagnoa (Ivory Coast)	2–0	(Mali) USFAS Bamako	2–0	0–0
Kawkab Marrakech (Morocco)	3–3 (5–4 p)	(Burkina Faso) USFA	3–0	0–3
Light Stars (Seychelles)	0–9	(South Africa) Bidvest Wits	0–3	0–6
Renaissance (Chad)	3–2	(Cameroon) New Star de Douala	1–0	2–2
Harare City (Zimbabwe)	6–3	(Madagascar) AS Adema	3–2	3–1
AS Bakaridjan (Mali)	2–2 (3–4 p)	(Tunisia) Stade Gabèsien	1–1	1–1
Nasarawa United (Nigeria)	2–1	(Senegal) Génération Foot	2–1	0–0
Defence Force (Ethiopia)	1–6	(Egypt) Misr Lel Makkasa	1–3	0–3
FC Saint-Éloi Lupopo (Democratic Republic of the Congo)	3–1	(Kenya) Bandari	2–0	1–1
Al-Ittihad Tripoli (Libya)	5–4	(Niger) AS SONIDEP	4–1	1–3
UMS de Loum (Cameroon)	0–0 (2–4 p) w/o; d/q	(Equatorial Guinea) Deportivo Mongomo	0–0	0–0
Khartoum (Sudan)	0–2	(Uganda) SC Villa	0–1	0–1
JKU (Zanzibar)	w/o	(Botswana) Gaborone United	—	—
Fomboni Club (Comoros)	1–2	(Burundi) Atlético Olympic	1–0	0–2
Diables Noirs (Republic of the Congo)	2–4	(Ivory Coast) Africa Sports	1–2	1–2

13 February 2016
15:30 UTC+1

Vita Club Mokanda (Republic of the Congo)	0–1	(Nigeria) Akwa United
	Report	Ekpai 35'

Stade Municipal, Pointe-Noire
Referee: Etienne Gabato (Central African Republic)
27 February 2016
19:00 UTC+1

Akwa United (Nigeria)	0–1	(Republic of the Congo) Vita Club Mokanda
	Report	Kalupumbu 53'
Penalties
	5–6

Akwa Ibom Stadium, Uyo
Referee: Kouassi Frederic Francois Biro (Ivory Coast)

1–1 on aggregate. Vita Club Mokanda won 6–5 on penalties.

13 February 2016
15:30 UTC+2

Police (Rwanda)	3–1	(South Sudan) Atlabara
Usengimana 9'; Twagizimana 58'; Songa 73'	Report	Khamis 39'

Stade Régional Nyamirambo, Kigali
Referee: Mashood Ssali (Uganda)
28 February 2016
16:30 UTC+3

Atlabara (South Sudan)	2–1	(Rwanda) Police
Ajak 28'; Wurube 49'	Report	Songa 46' (pen.)

Juba Stadium, Juba
Referee: Andrew Otieno (Kenya)

Police won 4–3 on aggregate.

13 February 2016
15:00 UTC+1

Sagrada Esperança (Angola)	1–2	(South Africa) Ajax Cape Town
Oliveira 18'	Report	Gamildien 14'; Norodien 53'

Estádio Sagrada Esperança, Dundo
Referee: Stanley Hachiwa (Zambia)
27 February 2016
19:30 UTC+2

Ajax Cape Town (South Africa)	0–2	(Angola) Sagrada Esperança
	Report	Love 21', 90'

Athlone Stadium, Cape Town
Referee: Allister Barra (Seychelles)

Sagrada Esperança won 3–2 on aggregate.

12 February 2016

Wallidan (The Gambia)	Cancelled	(Algeria) MC Oran
	Report

26 February 2016

MC Oran (Algeria)	Cancelled	(The Gambia) Wallidan
	Report

MC Oran won on walkover after Wallidan withdrew.

13 February 2016
15:30 UTC+0

SC Gagnoa (Ivory Coast)	2–0	(Mali) USFAS Bamako
Kassi 23'; Coulibaly 45'	Report

Stade Robert Champroux, Abidjan
Referee: Maguette N'Diaye (Senegal)
28 February 2016
16:30 UTC+0

USFAS Bamako (Mali)	0–0	(Ivory Coast) SC Gagnoa
	Report

Stade Modibo Kéïta, Bamako
Referee: Moumouni Kiagou (Benin)

SC Gagnoa won 2–0 on aggregate.

14 February 2016
15:00 UTC+0

Kawkab Marrakech (Morocco)	3–0	(Burkina Faso) USFA
Luiz Jeferson 14' (pen.); Aqqal 45'; Sabbar 90'	Report

Stade de Marrakech, Marrakech
Referee: Mohamed Ragab Omar (Libya)
27 February 2016
15:30 UTC+0

USFA (Burkina Faso)	3–0	(Morocco) Kawkab Marrakech
Traoré 55' (pen.); Kpan 64'; Kafando 80'	Report
Penalties
	4–5

Stade du 4 Août, Ouagadougou
Referee: Benjamin Odey (Nigeria)

3–3 on aggregate. Kawkab Marrakech won 5–4 on penalties.

13 February 2016
16:00 UTC+4

Light Stars (Seychelles)	0–3	(South Africa) Bidvest Wits
	Report	Sheppard 7'; Vilakazi 24'; Lecki 63'

Amitié Stadium, Praslin
Referee: Samuel Chirindza (Mozambique)
27 February 2016
18:00 UTC+2

Bidvest Wits (South Africa)	6–0	(Seychelles) Light Stars
Vilakazi 13'; Mosiatlhaga 34'; Pule 38'; Jordan 56'; Lupeta 87'; Sheppard 90'	Report

Bidvest Stadium, Johannesburg
Referee: Soulaimane Ansudane (Comoros)

Bidvest Wits won 9–0 on aggregate.

13 February 2016
15:00 UTC+1

Renaissance (Chad)	1–0	(Cameroon) New Star de Douala
Hamit 14'	Report

Stade Omnisports Idriss Mahamat Ouya, N'Djamena
Referee: Beranger Woungui (Gabon)
27 February 2016
15:30 UTC+1

New Star de Douala (Cameroon)	2–2	(Chad) Renaissance
Nsangue 78'; Nkama 81'	Report	Mahamat 24', 51'

Stade de la Réunification, Douala
Referee: Jean Pierre Tshiamala Kabangu (Congo DR)

Renaissance won 3–2 on aggregate.

13 February 2016
14:00 UTC+2

Harare City (Zimbabwe)	3–2	(Madagascar) AS Adema
Chitiyo 38'; Manuvire 40', 88'	Report	Rajaoniasy 46'; Voavy 51' (pen.)

Rufaro Stadium, Harare
Referee: Romualdo Do Rosario Baltazar (Angola)
28 February 2016
14:30 UTC+3

AS Adema (Madagascar)	1–3	(Zimbabwe) Harare City
Ramahaison 38'	Report	Manuvire 56'; Madhanaga 65'; Kumwala 70'

Rabemananjara Stadium, Mahajanga
Referee: Dharamveer Hurbungs (Mauritius)

Harare City won 6–3 on aggregate.

12 February 2016
16:00 UTC+0

AS Bakaridjan (Mali)	1–1	(Tunisia) Stade Gabèsien
Maiga 58'	Report	Cissé 39'

Stade Modibo Kéïta, Bamako
Referee: Sheriff Njie (Gambia)
27 February 2016
14:00 UTC+1

Stade Gabèsien (Tunisia)	1–1	(Mali) AS Bakaridjan
Essifi 44'	Report	Sidibé 22'
Penalties
	4–3

Stade Municipal de Gabès, Gabès
Referee: Samir Guezzaz (Morocco)

2–2 on aggregate. Stade Gabèsien won 4–3 on penalties.

14 February 2016
16:00 UTC+1

Nasarawa United (Nigeria)	2–1	(Senegal) Génération Foot
Fabiyi 6'; Sogbeso 87' (pen.)	Report	Niane 48'

National Stadium, Abuja
Referee: Amadou Thiam (Mauritania)
27 February 2016
17:00 UTC+0

Génération Foot (Senegal)	0–0	(Nigeria) Nasarawa United
	Report

Stade Demba Diop, Dakar
Referee: Hamidu Bomison (Ghana)

Nasarawa United won 2–1 on aggregate.

13 February 2016
16:00 UTC+3

Defence Force (Ethiopia)	1–3	(Egypt) Misr Lel Makkasa
Naser 89'	Report	Ragab 9'; Barakat 20'; Hamdy 86'

Addis Ababa Stadium, Addis Ababa
Referee: Souleiman Ahmed Djama (Djibouti)
27 February 2016
20:00 UTC+2

Misr Lel Makkasa (Egypt)	3–0	(Ethiopia) Defence Force
Barakat 59'; Hamdy 73'; Najdi 90' (pen.)	Report

Fayoum Stadium, Fayoum
Referee: Mahmood Ali Mahmood Ismail (Sudan)

Misr Lel Makkasa won 6–1 on aggregate.

14 February 2016
15:30 UTC+2

FC Saint-Éloi Lupopo (Democratic Republic of the Congo)	2–0	(Kenya) Bandari
Mutshimba 36'; Maolongi 83'	Report

Stade Frederic Kibassa Maliba, Lubumbashi
Referee: Jean Claude Ishimwe (Rwanda)
28 February 2016
15:00 UTC+3

Bandari (Kenya)	1–1	(Democratic Republic of the Congo) FC Saint-Éloi Lupopo
Lavatsa 90' (pen.)	Report	Maolongi 20'

Nyayo National Stadium, Nairobi
Referee: Ring Nyier Akech Malong (South Sudan)

FC Saint-Éloi Lupopo won 3–1 on aggregate.

12 February 2016
14:00 UTC+1

Al-Ittihad Tripoli (Libya)	4–1	(Niger) AS SONIDEP
Chtiba 11'; Al Borki 45'; Sabbou 62'; Mahfud 90'	Report	Ide 21'

Stade Taïeb Mhiri, Sfax (Tunisia) (Note: Teams from Libya were not allowed to host their home matches in their country due to security concerns.)
Referee: Mustapha Ghorbal (Algeria)
5 March 2016 (Note: The AS SONIDEP v Al-Ittihad Tripoli match was postponed due to a strike at Niamey airport.)
16:00 UTC+1

AS SONIDEP (Niger)	3–1	(Libya) Al-Ittihad Tripoli
Traoré 73'; Souleymane 88'; Atsen 90'	Report	Zuway 3'

Stade Municipal, Niamey
Referee: Mandeng Cosmas (Cameroon)

Al-Ittihad Tripoli won 5–4 on aggregate.

14 February 2016
15:30 UTC+1

UMS de Loum (Cameroon)	0–0	(Equatorial Guinea) Deportivo Mongomo
	Report

Stade de la Réunification, Douala
Referee: Alhadi Mahamat (Chad)
27 February 2016
18:00 UTC+1

Deportivo Mongomo (Equatorial Guinea)	0–0	(Cameroon) UMS de Loum
	Report
Penalties
	4–2

Estadio de Bata, Bata
Referee: Fitial Charel Just Kokolo (Congo)

0–0 on aggregate. Deportivo Mongomo won 4–2 on penalties.
The CAF announced on 2 March 2016 that UMS de Loum won on walkover after Deportivo Mongomo were disqualified for fielding an ineligible player.

13 February 2016
16:45 UTC+3

Khartoum (Sudan)	0–1	(Uganda) SC Villa
	Report	Lwanga 19'

Khartoum Stadium, Khartoum
Referee: Haileyesus Bazezew (Ethiopia)
27 February 2016
16:00 UTC+3

SC Villa (Uganda)	1–0	(Sudan) Khartoum
Lwesibawa 40'	Report

Nakivubo Stadium, Kampala
Referee: Hagi Wiish (Somalia)

SC Villa won 2–0 on aggregate.

14 February 2016
16:30 UTC+3

JKU (Zanzibar)	Cancelled	(Botswana) Gaborone United
	Report

Amaan Stadium, Zanzibar City
Referee: Georges Gatogato (Burundi)
27 February 2016
16:00 UTC+2

Gaborone United (Botswana)	Cancelled	(Zanzibar) JKU
	Report

Francistown Stadium, Francistown
Referee: Eketsang Welcome Setloboko (South Africa)

JKU won on walkover after Gaborone United withdrew.

13 February 2016
15:00 UTC+3

Fomboni Club (Comoros)	1–0	(Burundi) Atlético Olympic
Youssouf 77' (pen.)	Report

Stade de Moroni, Moroni
Referee: Tshepo Mokani Gobagoba (Botswana)
27 February 2016
15:00 UTC+2

Atlético Olympic (Burundi)	2–0	(Comoros) Fomboni Club
Nduwimana 20'; Hakizimana 90+3'	Report

Prince Louis Rwagasore Stadium, Bujumbura
Referee: Waziri Waziri (Tanzania)

Atlético Olympic won 2–1 on aggregate.

14 February 2016
15:30 UTC+1

Diables Noirs (Republic of the Congo)	1–2	(Ivory Coast) Africa Sports
Ibara 69'	Report	Dogba 39', 66'

Stade Alphonse Massemba-Débat, Brazzaville
Referee: Diosdado Nzibi (Equatorial Guinea)
27 February 2016
15:30 UTC+0

Africa Sports (Ivory Coast)	2–1	(Republic of the Congo) Diables Noirs
Dagnogo 29', 81'	Report	Tsiba 61'

Stade Félix Houphouët-Boigny, Abidjan
Referee: Ousmane Camara (Guinea)

Africa Sports won 4–2 on aggregate.

== First round ==
The first round included 32 teams: the 19 winners of the preliminary round, and the 13 teams that received byes to this round.

Team 1	Agg.	Team 2	1st leg	2nd leg
Vita Club Mokanda (Republic of the Congo)	1–0	(Rwanda) Police	0–0	1–0
Sagrada Esperança (Angola)	2–1	(Mozambique) Liga Desportiva de Maputo	1–0	1–1
MC Oran (Algeria)	4–2	(Ivory Coast) SC Gagnoa	2–0	2–2
Kawkab Marrakech (Morocco)	3–2	(Liberia) Barrack Young Controllers II	3–0	0–2
Bidvest Wits (South Africa)	3–7	(Tanzania) Azam	0–3	3–4
Renaissance (Chad)	0–7	(Tunisia) Espérance de Tunis	0–2	0–5
Harare City (Zimbabwe)	2–5	(Zambia) Zanaco	1–2	1–3
Stade Gabèsien (Tunisia)	2–1	(Guinea) AS Kaloum	2–1	0–0
Nasarawa United (Nigeria)	2–4	(Algeria) CS Constantine	1–0	1–4
Misr Lel Makkasa (Egypt)	3–2	(Democratic Republic of the Congo) CS Don Bosco	3–1	0–1
FC Saint-Éloi Lupopo (Democratic Republic of the Congo)	2–2 (a)	(Sudan) Al-Ahly Shendi	2–1	0–1
Al-Ittihad Tripoli (Libya)	1–2	(Ghana) Medeama	1–0	0–2
UMS de Loum (Cameroon)	2–3	(Morocco) FUS Rabat	1–1	1–2
SC Villa (Uganda)	5–0	(Zanzibar) JKU	4–0	1–0
Atlético Olympic (Burundi)	0–5	(Gabon) CF Mounana	0–2	0–3
Africa Sports (Ivory Coast)	1–6	(Egypt) ENPPI	0–2	1–4

12 March 2016
15:30 UTC+1

Vita Club Mokanda (Republic of the Congo)	0–0	(Rwanda) Police
	Report

Stade Municipal, Pointe-Noire
Referee: Jean-Jacques Ndala Ngambo (Congo DR)
19 March 2016
15:30 UTC+2

Police (Rwanda)	0–1	(Republic of the Congo) Vita Club Mokanda
	Report	Ossagatsama 80'

Stade Régional Nyamirambo, Kigali
Referee: Alhadi Mahamat (Chad)

Vita Club Mokanda won 1–0 on aggregate.

12 March 2016
15:00 UTC+1

Sagrada Esperança (Angola)	1–0	(Mozambique) Liga Desportiva de Maputo
Love 90+4'	Report

Estádio Sagrada Esperança, Dundo
Referee: Norman Matemera (Zimbabwe)
19 March 2016
15:00 UTC+2

Liga Desportiva de Maputo (Mozambique)	1–1	(Angola) Sagrada Esperança
Dayson 89'	Report	Love 90+4' (pen.)

Estádio do Zimpeto, Maputo
Referee: Ahmad Imtehaz Heeralall (Mauritius)

Sagrada Esperança won 2–1 on aggregate.

12 March 2016
18:00 UTC+1

MC Oran (Algeria)	2–0	(Ivory Coast) SC Gagnoa
Benyahia 21', 52'	Report

Stade Ahmed Zabana, Oran
Attendance: 20,000
Referee: Fidel Gomes (Guinea-Bissau)
19 March 2016
15:30 UTC+0

SC Gagnoa (Ivory Coast)	2–2	(Algeria) MC Oran
Doumouya 23'; Kassi 27'	Report	Larbi 4'; N'Guessan 78' (o.g.)

Stade Robert Champroux, Abidjan
Referee: Abubakar Ago (Nigeria)

MC Oran won 4–2 on aggregate.

12 March 2016
18:00 UTC+0

Kawkab Marrakech (Morocco)	3–0	(Liberia) Barrack Young Controllers II
Mansouri 5'; Amimi 45', 61'	Report

Stade de Marrakech, Marrakech
Referee: Daudu Williams (Sierra Leone)
20 March 2016
16:00 UTC+0

Barrack Young Controllers II (Liberia)	2–0	(Morocco) Kawkab Marrakech
George 79'; Kennedy 88' (pen.)	Report

Antoinette Tubman Stadium, Monrovia
Referee: Fabricio Duarte (Cape Verde)

Kawkab Marrakech won 3–2 on aggregate.

12 March 2016
18:00 UTC+2

Bidvest Wits (South Africa)	0–3	(Tanzania) Azam
	Report	Abubakar 51'; Kapombe 56'; Bocco 61'

Bidvest Stadium, Johannesburg
Referee: Andofetra Rakotojaona (Madagascar)
20 March 2016
15:15 UTC+3

Azam (Tanzania)	4–3	(South Africa) Bidvest Wits
Kipré 23', 55', 88'; Bocco 41'	Report	Shongwe 44'; Mosiatlhaga 60'; Botes 90'

Chamazi Stadium, Dar es Salaam
Referee: Gait Metodious Oting (South Sudan)

Azam won 7–3 on aggregate.

12 March 2016
15:50 UTC+1

Renaissance (Chad)	0–2	(Tunisia) Espérance de Tunis
	Report	Khenissi 13'; Chaalali 65'

Stade Omnisports Idriss Mahamat Ouya, N'Djamena
Referee: Israel Mujuni (Tanzania)
19 March 2016
15:00 UTC+1

Espérance de Tunis (Tunisia)	5–0	(Chad) Renaissance
Khenissi 4'; Mhirsi 12'; Jelassi 52', 87' (pen.); Jouini 59'	Report

Stade Olympique de Radès, Tunis
Referee: Mustapha Ghorbal (Algeria)

Espérance de Tunis won 7–0 on aggregate.

12 March 2016
15:00 UTC+2

Harare City (Zimbabwe)	1–2	(Zambia) Zanaco
Ruzvidzo 88'	Report	Funga 35'; Kabwe 83'

Rufaro Stadium, Harare
Referee: Dennis Nguluwe (Malawi)
20 March 2016
15:00 UTC+2

Zanaco (Zambia)	3–1	(Zimbabwe) Harare City
Tembo 38', 78'; Daka 87'	Report	Chimutimunzeve 9'

Sunset Stadium, Lusaka
Referee: Fitial Charel Just Kokolo (Congo)

Zanaco won 5–2 on aggregate.

12 March 2016
14:00 UTC+1

Stade Gabèsien (Tunisia)	2–1	(Guinea) AS Kaloum
Jelassi 3'; Hosni 17'	Report	Camara 88'

Stade Municipal de Gabès, Gabès
Referee: Moumouni Kiagou (Benin)
18 March 2016
17:00 UTC+0

AS Kaloum (Guinea)	0–0	(Tunisia) Stade Gabèsien
	Report

Stade du 28 Septembre, Conakry
Referee: Ali Lemghaifry (Mauritania)

Stade Gabèsien won 2–1 on aggregate.

13 March 2016
14:00 UTC+1

Nasarawa United (Nigeria)	1–0	(Algeria) CS Constantine
Azango 84'	Report

National Stadium, Abuja
Referee: Jerry Yekeh (Liberia)
19 March 2016
18:00 UTC+1

CS Constantine (Algeria)	4–1	(Nigeria) Nasarawa United
Bezzaz 45' (pen.); Messadia 76'; Meghni 79'; Voavy 84'	Report	Bature 68'

Stade Mohamed Hamlaoui, Constantine
Attendance: 30,000
Referee: Yakhouba Keita (Guinea)

CS Constantine won 4–2 on aggregate.

12 March 2016
18:00 UTC+2

Misr Lel Makkasa (Egypt)	3–1	(Democratic Republic of the Congo) CS Don Bosco
Barakat 17'; Gaber 40'; Poku 83'	Report	Kubanza 87'

Fayoum Stadium, Fayoum
Referee: Hassan Mohamed Hagi (Somalia)
19 March 2016
15:30 UTC+2

CS Don Bosco (Democratic Republic of the Congo)	1–0	(Egypt) Misr Lel Makkasa
Ilongo 53' (pen.)	Report

Stade TP Mazembe, Lubumbashi
Referee: Osiase Koto (Lesotho)

Misr Lel Makkasa won 3–2 on aggregate.

13 March 2016
15:30 UTC+2

FC Saint-Éloi Lupopo (Democratic Republic of the Congo)	2–1	(Sudan) Al-Ahly Shendi
Mutshimba 64'; Mampuya 90+5'	Report	Mozamil 53'

Stade Frederic Kibassa Maliba, Lubumbashi
Referee: Antonio Muachihuissa Caxala (Angola)
20 March 2016
20:00 UTC+3

Al-Ahly Shendi (Sudan)	1–0	(Democratic Republic of the Congo) FC Saint-Éloi Lupopo
Osunwa 10'	Report

Shendi Stadium, Shendi
Referee: Mahmoud Ashour (Egypt)

2–2 on aggregate. Al-Ahly Shendi won on away goals.

13 March 2016
16:00 UTC+1

Al-Ittihad Tripoli (Libya)	1–0	(Ghana) Medeama
Chtiba 45' (pen.)	Report

Stade Taïeb Mhiri, Sfax (Tunisia)
Referee: Mutaz Khairalla (Sudan)
20 March 2016
15:00 UTC+0

Medeama (Ghana)	2–0	(Libya) Al-Ittihad Tripoli
Mohammed 10', 35'	Report

Sekondi-Takoradi Stadium, Sekondi-Takoradi
Referee: Daouda Guèye (Senegal)

Medeama won 2–1 on aggregate.

11 March 2016
15:00 UTC+1

UMS de Loum (Cameroon)	1–1	(Morocco) FUS Rabat
Deugoué 90+1'	Report	Aguerd 30'

Stade de la Réunification, Douala
Referee: Jean Marc Ganamandji (Central African Republic)
19 March 2016
19:00 UTC+0

FUS Rabat (Morocco)	2–1	(Cameroon) UMS de Loum
Benjelloun 11'; Batna 63'	Report	Deugoué 70'

Stade de FUS, Rabat
Referee: Haithem Kossaï (Tunisia)

FUS Rabat won 3–2 on aggregate.

12 March 2016
16:00 UTC+3

SC Villa (Uganda)	4–0	(Zanzibar) JKU
Ndera 9'; Sserumaga 34'; Kasumba 47'; Lwesibawa 61'	Report

Mandela National Stadium, Kampala
Referee: Souleiman Ahmed Djama (Djibouti)
18 March 2016
16:30 UTC+3

JKU (Zanzibar)	0–1	(Uganda) SC Villa
	Report	Kirya 46'

Amaan Stadium, Zanzibar City
Referee: Ali Adelaïd (Comoros)

SC Villa won 5–0 on aggregate.

12 March 2016
15:00 UTC+2

Atlético Olympic (Burundi)	0–2	(Gabon) CF Mounana
	Report	Guedegbe 7'; Biyoghe 17'

Prince Louis Rwagasore Stadium, Bujumbura
Referee: Henry Mouandjo (Cameroon)
20 March 2016
15:30 UTC+1

CF Mounana (Gabon)	3–0	(Burundi) Atlético Olympic
Biyoghe 25'; Mba 59'; Ouédraogo 90'	Report

Stade Augustin Monédan de Sibang, Libreville
Referee: Jean Claude Ishimwe (Rwanda)

CF Mounana won 5–0 on aggregate.

12 March 2016
16:00 UTC+0

Africa Sports (Ivory Coast)	0–2	(Egypt) ENPPI
	Report	Koné 16'; Kaoud 21'

Stade Félix Houphouët-Boigny, Abidjan
Referee: Ousmane Sidibé (Mali)
20 March 2016
17:00 UTC+2

ENPPI (Egypt)	4–1	(Ivory Coast) Africa Sports
Yehia 4' (pen.); Oukri 42'; Koné 82'; Farrag 86'	Report	Traoré 70' (pen.)

Petro Sport Stadium, Cairo
Referee: Noureddine El Jaafari (Morocco)

ENPPI won 6–1 on aggregate.

== Second round ==
The second round included the 16 winners of the first round.

Team 1	Agg.	Team 2	1st leg	2nd leg
Vita Club Mokanda (Republic of the Congo)	1–4	(Angola) Sagrada Esperança	1–2	0–2
MC Oran (Algeria)	0–1	(Morocco) Kawkab Marrakech	0–0	0–1
Azam (Tanzania)	2–4	(Tunisia) Espérance de Tunis	2–1	0–3
Zanaco (Zambia)	1–4	(Tunisia) Stade Gabèsien	1–1	0–3
CS Constantine (Algeria)	2–3	(Egypt) Misr Lel Makkasa	1–0	1–3
Al-Ahly Shendi (Sudan)	0–2	(Ghana) Medeama	0–0	0–2
FUS Rabat (Morocco)	7–1	(Uganda) SC Villa	7–0	0–1
CF Mounana (Gabon)	2–2 (5–4 p)	(Egypt) ENPPI	2–0	0–2

10 April 2016
15:30 UTC+1

Vita Club Mokanda (Republic of the Congo)	1–2	(Angola) Sagrada Esperança
Mulodi 80'	Report	Oliveira 25'; Love 55'

Stade Municipal, Pointe-Noire
Referee: Hudu Munyemana (Rwanda)
19 April 2016
15:30 UTC+1

Sagrada Esperança (Angola)	2–0	(Republic of the Congo) Vita Club Mokanda
Guedes 50'; Joka 90'	Report

Estádio Sagrada Esperança, Dundo
Referee: Antoine Effa (Cameroon)

Sagrada Esperança won 4–1 on aggregate.

9 April 2016
18:00 UTC+1

MC Oran (Algeria)	0–0	(Morocco) Kawkab Marrakech
	Report

Stade Ahmed Zabana, Oran
Attendance: 25,000
Referee: Daouda Guèye (Senegal)
20 April 2016
20:00 UTC+1

Kawkab Marrakech (Morocco)	1–0	(Algeria) MC Oran
El Fakih 34' (pen.)	Report

Stade de Marrakech, Marrakech
Referee: Sékou Ahmed Touré (Guinea)

Kawkab Marrakech won 1–0 on aggregate.

10 April 2016
15:15 UTC+3

Azam (Tanzania)	2–1	(Tunisia) Espérance de Tunis
Musa 69'; Singano 70'	Report	Jouini 34'

Chamazi Stadium, Dar es Salaam
Referee: Daniel Bennett (South Africa)
19 April 2016
19:00 UTC+1

Espérance de Tunis (Tunisia)	3–0	(Tanzania) Azam
Bguir 47'; Jouini 63'; Ben Youssef 81'	Report

Stade Olympique de Radès, Tunis
Referee: Rédouane Jiyed (Morocco)

Espérance de Tunis won 4–2 on aggregate.

9 April 2016
15:00 UTC+2

Zanaco (Zambia)	1–1	(Tunisia) Stade Gabèsien
Kabwe 25'	Report	Hosni 66'

Nkoloma Stadium, Lusaka
Referee: Ferdinand Udoh (Nigeria)
19 April 2016
14:30 UTC+1

Stade Gabèsien (Tunisia)	3–0	(Zambia) Zanaco
Hosni 22'; Essifi 31', 69'	Report

Stade Municipal de Gabès, Gabès
Referee: Mutaz Khairalla (Sudan)

Stade Gabèsien won 4–1 on aggregate.

9 April 2016
18:00 UTC+1

CS Constantine (Algeria)	1–0	(Egypt) Misr Lel Makkasa
Meghni 85'	Report

Stade Mohamed Hamlaoui, Constantine
Attendance: 35,000
Referee: Mohamed Ragab Omar (Libya)
20 April 2016
18:00 UTC+2

Misr Lel Makkasa (Egypt)	3–1	(Algeria) CS Constantine
Poku 12'; Fathi 51'; Gaber 84'	Report	Voavy 76'

Fayoum Stadium, Fayoum
Referee: Bouchaïb El Ahrach (Morocco)

Misr Lel Makkasa won 3–2 on aggregate.

10 April 2016
20:00 UTC+3

Al-Ahly Shendi (Sudan)	0–0	(Ghana) Medeama
	Report

Shendi Stadium, Shendi
Referee: Denis Batte (Uganda)
20 April 2016
15:00 UTC+0

Medeama (Ghana)	2–0	(Sudan) Al-Ahly Shendi
Boahene 27'; Mohammed 30'	Report

Sekondi-Takoradi Stadium, Sekondi-Takoradi
Referee: Fidel Gomes (Guinea-Bissau)

Medeama won 2–0 on aggregate.

8 April 2016
20:30 UTC+1

FUS Rabat (Morocco)	7–0	(Uganda) SC Villa
Batna 26'; Sy 34'; Benjelloun 40'; El Bassil 47'; Saâdane 70'; El Gnaoui 80'; Fouzair 90'	Report

Stade de FUS, Rabat
Referee: Mohamed Maarouf (Egypt)
20 April 2016
16:00 UTC+3

SC Villa (Uganda)	1–0	(Morocco) FUS Rabat
Kasumba 56' (pen.)	Report

Mandela National Stadium, Kampala
Referee: Thierry Nkurunziza (Burundi)

FUS Rabat won 7–1 on aggregate.

10 April 2016
15:00 UTC+1

CF Mounana (Gabon)	2–0	(Egypt) ENPPI
Mba 17'; Biyeme 58' (pen.)	Report

Stade Augustin Monédan de Sibang, Libreville
Referee: Jean-Jacques Ndala Ngambo (Congo DR)
20 April 2016
18:00 UTC+2

ENPPI (Egypt)	2–0	(Gabon) CF Mounana
Farrag 31'; Martínez 86'	Report
Penalties
Martínez (penalty scored); Yehia (penalty scored); Nasef (penalty missed); Kaoud (penalty scored); Abdel Zaher (penalty scored); Soliman (penalty missed); Ibrahim (penalty missed)	4–5	(penalty missed) Biyeme; (penalty scored) Guedegbe; (penalty scored) Ouédraogo; (penalty scored) Mba; (penalty scored) Autchanga; (penalty missed) Ngonga; (penalty scored) Massamba

Petro Sport Stadium, Cairo
Referee: Mustapha Ghorbal (Algeria)

2–2 on aggregate. CF Mounana won 5–4 on penalties.

== Play-off round ==
The play-off round included 16 teams: the eight winners of the Confederation Cup second round and the eight losers of the Champions League second round. The draw for the play-off round was held on 21 April 2016, 14:00 EET (UTC+2), at the CAF Headquarters in Cairo, Egypt. The winners of the Confederation Cup second round were drawn against the losers of the Champions League second round, with the former hosting the second leg.

The 16 teams were seeded by their performances in the CAF competitions for the previous five seasons (CAF 5-year ranking points shown in parentheses):

- Pot A contained the two highest-ranked winners of the Confederation Cup second round.
- Pot B contained the six lowest-ranked losers of the Champions League second round.
- Pot C contained the two highest-ranked losers of the Champions League second round.
- Pot D contained the six lowest-ranked losers of the Confederation Cup second round.

First, a team from Pot A and a team from Pot B were drawn into two ties. Next, a team from Pot C and a team from Pot D were drawn into two ties. Finally, the remaining teams from Pot B and Pot D were drawn into the last four ties.

Pot	Pot A	Pot B	Pot C	Pot D
Qualified from	Confederation Cup	Champions League	Champions League	Confederation Cup
Seeding	Seeded	Unseeded	Seeded	Unseeded
Teams	(Tunisia) Espérance de Tunis (35 pts); (Morocco) FUS Rabat (3 pts)	(Sudan) Al-Merrikh (19 pts); (Mali) Stade Malien (13 pts); (Algeria) MO Béjaïa; (South Africa) Mamelodi Sundowns; (Libya) Al-Ahli Tripoli; (Tanzania) Young Africans	(Democratic Republic of the Congo) TP Mazembe (52 pts); (Tunisia) Étoile du Sahel (27 pts)	(Ghana) Medeama; (Gabon) CF Mounana; (Tunisia) Stade Gabèsien; (Egypt) Misr Lel Makkasa; (Morocco) Kawkab Marrakech; (Angola) Sagrada Esperança

The eight winners of the play-off round advanced to the group stage.

Team 1	Agg.	Team 2	1st leg	2nd leg
MO Béjaïa (Algeria)	1–1 (a)	(Tunisia) Espérance de Tunis	0–0	1–1
Stade Malien (Mali)	0–4	(Morocco) FUS Rabat	0–0	0–4
Étoile du Sahel (Tunisia)	2–1	(Gabon) CF Mounana	2–0	0–1
TP Mazembe (Democratic Republic of the Congo)	2–2 (a)	(Tunisia) Stade Gabèsien	1–0	1–2
Al-Ahli Tripoli (Libya)	1–1 (a)	(Egypt) Misr Lel Makkasa	0–0	1–1
Al-Merrikh (Sudan)	1–2	(Morocco) Kawkab Marrakech	1–0	0–2
Young Africans (Tanzania)	2–1	(Angola) Sagrada Esperança	2–0	0–1
Mamelodi Sundowns (South Africa)	3–3 (a)	(Ghana) Medeama	3–1	0–2

7 May 2016
18:00 UTC+1

MO Béjaïa (Algeria)	0–0	(Tunisia) Espérance de Tunis
	Report

Stade de l'Unité Maghrébine, Béjaïa
Referee: Malang Diedhiou (Senegal)
17 May 2016
18:00 UTC+1

Espérance de Tunis (Tunisia)	1–1	(Algeria) MO Béjaïa
Chaalali 29'	Report	Ndoye 33'

Stade Olympique de Radès, Tunis
Referee: Gehad Grisha (Egypt)

1–1 on aggregate. MO Béjaïa won on away goals.

7 May 2016
17:00 UTC+0

Stade Malien (Mali)	0–0	(Morocco) FUS Rabat
	Report

Stade Modibo Kéïta, Bamako
Referee: Juste Ephrem Zio (Burkina Faso)
18 May 2016
20:30 UTC+1

FUS Rabat (Morocco)	4–0	(Mali) Stade Malien
Kondé 31'; Nahiri 51'; Njie 77'; Batna 79'	Report

Stade de FUS, Rabat
Referee: Youssef Essrayri (Tunisia)

FUS Rabat won 4–0 on aggregate.

6 May 2016
18:00 UTC+1

Étoile du Sahel (Tunisia)	2–0	(Gabon) CF Mounana
Boughattas 45'; Msakni 65'	Report

Stade Olympique de Sousse, Sousse
Referee: El Fadil Mohamed (Sudan)
18 May 2016
15:00 UTC+1

CF Mounana (Gabon)	1–0	(Tunisia) Étoile du Sahel
Autchanga 40'	Report

Stade Augustin Monédan de Sibang, Libreville
Referee: Bamlak Tessema Weyesa (Ethiopia)

Étoile du Sahel won 2–1 on aggregate.

8 May 2016
15:30 UTC+2

TP Mazembe (Democratic Republic of the Congo)	1–0	(Tunisia) Stade Gabèsien
Bolingi 90+5'	Report

Stade TP Mazembe, Lubumbashi
Referee: Daniel Bennett (South Africa)
17 May 2016
14:30 UTC+1

Stade Gabèsien (Tunisia)	2–1	(Democratic Republic of the Congo) TP Mazembe
Fouzai 28' (pen.); Hosni 74'	Report	Bokadi 69'

Stade Municipal de Gabès, Gabès
Referee: Bakary Gassama (Gambia)

2–2 on aggregate. TP Mazembe won on away goals.

6 May 2016
16:00 UTC+1

Al-Ahli Tripoli (Libya)	0–0	(Egypt) Misr Lel Makkasa
	Report

Stade Chedli Zouiten, Tunis (Tunisia)
Referee: Ali Lemghaifry (Mauritania)
18 May 2016
19:00 UTC+2

Misr Lel Makkasa (Egypt)	1–1	(Libya) Al-Ahli Tripoli
Poku 18'	Report	Msoud 84' (pen.)

Fayoum Stadium, Fayoum
Referee: Sidi Alioum (Cameroon)

1–1 on aggregate. Al-Ahli Tripoli won on away goals.

7 May 2016
20:00 UTC+3

Al-Merrikh (Sudan)	1–0	(Morocco) Kawkab Marrakech
Agab 33'	Report

Al-Merrikh Stadium, Omdurman
Referee: Janny Sikazwe (Zambia)
18 May 2016
20:00 UTC+1

Kawkab Marrakech (Morocco)	2–0	(Sudan) Al-Merrikh
El Fakih 12' (pen.), 86' (pen.)	Report

Stade de Marrakech, Marrakech
Referee: Eric Otogo-Castane (Gabon)

Kawkab Marrakech won 2–1 on aggregate.

7 May 2016
16:00 UTC+3

Young Africans (Tanzania)	2–0	(Angola) Sagrada Esperança
Msuva 73'; Anthony 90+1'	Report

National Stadium, Dar es Salaam
Referee: Joseph Lamptey (Ghana)
18 May 2016
15:00 UTC+1

Sagrada Esperança (Angola)	1–0	(Tanzania) Young Africans
Love 24'	Report

Estádio Sagrada Esperança, Dundo
Referee: Hamada Nampiandraza (Madagascar)

Young Africans won 2–1 on aggregate.

7 May 2016
18:00 UTC+2

Mamelodi Sundowns (South Africa)	3–1	(Ghana) Medeama
Castro 80'; Billiat 84'; Malajila 87'	Report	Kwakwa 1'

Lucas Masterpieces Moripe Stadium, Pretoria
Referee: Bernard Camille (Seychelles)
18 May 2016
15:00 UTC+0

Medeama (Ghana)	2–0	(South Africa) Mamelodi Sundowns
Akowuah 35' (pen.); Ofori 65'	Report

Sekondi-Takoradi Stadium, Sekondi-Takoradi
Referee: Mehdi Abid Charef (Algeria)

3–3 on aggregate. Medeama won on away goals.
The CAF announced on 24 May 2016 that Mamelodi Sundowns won their Champions League second round tie on walkover after AS Vita Club were disqualified for fielding an ineligible player in their preliminary round tie against Mafunzo. Mamelodi Sundowns played in the Confederation Cup play-off round before they were reinstated to the Champions League.
