= 2016–17 MO Béjaïa season =

MO Béjaïa
2016–17 season
- President: Zahir Attia
- Head coach: Nacer Sandjak (from 8 June 2016)
- Stadium: Stade de l'Unité Maghrébine
- Ligue 1: 16th
- Algerian Cup: Round of 64
- Confederation Cup: Runners–up
- Top goalscorer: League: Ahmed Messadia (9); All: Ahmed Messadia (9)

In the 2016–17 season, MO Béjaïa is competing in the Ligue 1 for the 4th season, as well as the Algerian Cup. It is their 4th consecutive season in the top flight of Algerian football. They will be competing in Ligue 1, the Algerian Cup and the Confederation Cup.

== Squad list ==
Players and squad numbers last updated on 19 August 2016.
Note: Flags indicate national team as has been defined under FIFA eligibility rules. Players may hold more than one non-FIFA nationality.

No.	Nat.	Position	Name	Date of birth (age)	Signed from
Goalkeepers
Defenders
Midfielders
Forwards

== Competitions ==
=== Overview ===
Competition	Record								Started round	Final position / round	First match	Last match
Competition	G	W	D	L	GF	GA	GD	Win %	Started round	Final position / round	First match	Last match
Ligue 1	30	3	10	17	23	49	−26	10.00	—N/a	16th	19 August 2016	14 June 2017
Algerian Cup	1	0	0	1	0	1	−1	0.00	Round of 64		26 November 2016	
Confederation Cup	8	1	4	3	4	8	−4	12.50	Group stage	Runners–up	29 June 2016	6 November 2016
Total	39	4	14	21	27	58	−31	10.26				

== League table ==
Pos	Team	Pld	W	D	L	GF	GA	GD	Pts	Qualification or relegation
12	Olympique de Médéa	30	10	8	12	32	40	−8	38 (Note: JS Kabylie ahead of Olympique de Médéa on head-to-head record: JSK–OMM 0–1, OMM–JSK 1–2.)	
13	USM El Harrach	30	7	15	8	15	21	−6	36 (Note: RC Relizane ahead of USM El Harrach on head-to-head record: RCR–UEH 0–0, UEH–RCR 0–0 however goal difference in the first leg RCR (−8) UEH (−1).)	
14	RC Relizane (Note: RC Relizane were deducted 3 points.) (R)	30	12	6	12	34	32	+2	36	Relegation to Ligue Professionnelle 2
15	CA Batna (R)	30	6	7	17	20	42	−22	25	Relegation to Ligue Professionnelle 2
16	MO Béjaïa (Note: MO Béjaïa recorded a match lost by penalty against JS Saoura because they were reduced to less than 7 players (Art. 84 Regulation of the Ligue Professionnelle 1 / Art 89 Disciplinary Code). In addition, the Bejaia club was deprived of their share of the television rights for this match. It was also punished by a deduction of 1 point and a fine of 100,000 DA.) (R)	30	3	10	17	23	49	−26	18	Relegation to Ligue Professionnelle 2

Updated to match(es) played on 14 June 2017. Source: DZFoot
Rules for classification: 1) points; 2) head-to-head points; 3) head-to-head goal difference; 4) goal difference; 5) total goals; 6) fairplay ranking; 7) playoff.
(R) Relegated

=== Results summary ===
Overall								Home						Away					
Pld	W	D	L	GF	GA	GD	Pts	W	D	L	GF	GA	GD	W	D	L	GF	GA	GD
15	2	5	8	12	23	−11	11	2	3	2	6	6	0	0	2	6	6	17	−11

Last updated: 27 December 2016.
Source: Competitive matches

=== Results by round ===
Round	1	2	3	4	5	6	7	8	9	10	11	12	13	14	15	16	17	18	19	20	21	22	23	24	25	26	27	28	29	30
Ground	A	H	A	H	H	A	A	H	A	A	H	H	A	A	H	H	A	H	A	H	A	H	A	H	A	H	A	H	A	H
Result	L	D	D	L	W	D	L	D	L	L	L	D	L	L	W															
Position	14	14	14	16	14	14	16	16	16	16	16	16	16	16	16															

Updated to match(es) played on 27 December 2016. Source: Competitive matches
A = Away; H = Home; W = Win; D = Draw; L = Loss

=== Matches ===
Win Draw Loss

19 August 2016 Round 1	USM Alger	2–0	MO Béjaïa	Bologhine
19:15	Darfalou 44'; Meftah 78' (pen.)	Soccerway report Live TV: None		Stadium: Stade Omar Hamadi; Referee: Mohamed Benouza

27 August 2016 Round 2	MO Béjaïa	2–2	DRB Tadjenanet	Béjaïa
19:00	Bencherifa 44'; Messaâdia 79'	Report; Live TV: None	1' Chettal; 90' Chibane	Stadium: Stade de l'Unité Maghrébine; Referee: Mohamed Boukhalfa

10 September 2016 Round 3	CS Constantine	2–2	MO Béjaïa	Constantine
21:00	Cherfa 5'; Bencherifa 18'	Report; Live TV: EPTV Terrestre / Algérie 3	45' Messadia; 90+3' Betorangal	Stadium: Stade Mohamed Hamlaoui; Referee: Redouane Necib

8 October 2016 Round 4	MO Béjaïa	1–0	CR Belouizdad	Béjaïa
17:00	Betorangal 17'	Report; Live TV: Algérie 3		Stadium: Stade de l'Unité Maghrébine; Referee: Said Aouina

22 November 2016 Round 5	Olympique de Médéa	4–0	MO Béjaïa	Médéa
15:00	Lamara 8'; Banouh 19'; Addadi 29'; Boukhenchouche 54'	Report; Live TV: None		Stadium: Stade Imam Lyes de Médéa; Referee: Mustapha Ghorbal

4 October 2016 Round 6	MO Béjaïa	0–1	RC Relizane	Béjaïa
19:00		Report; Live TV: None	80' Benayad	Stadium: Stade de l'Unité Maghrébine; Referee: Rafik Achouri

15 October 2016 Round 7	JS Kabylie	1–1	MO Béjaïa	Tizi Ouzou
17:00	Aiboud 20'	Report; Live TV: Algérie 3 / TV Tamazight 4	60' Rahal	Stadium: Stade 1er Novembre 1954; Referee: Mehdi Abid Charef

12 November 2016 Round 11	USM Bel-Abbès	2–1	MO Béjaïa	Sidi Bel Abbès
14:30	Bouguelmouna 16', 26'	Report; Live TV: None	63' Messadia	Stadium: Stade 24 Fevrier 1956; Referee: Rafik Achouri

6 December 2016 Round 8	MO Béjaïa	0–1	MC Alger	Sétif
16:00		Report; Live TV: None	22' Nekkache	Stadium: Stade 8 Mai 1945; Attendance: 0 (close doors)

13 December 2016 Round 9	USM El Harrach	1–0	MO Béjaïa	El Harrach
15:00; Match rescheduled due to MO Béjaïa competing in the 2016 CAF Confederation Cup	Mellel 80'	Report; Live TV: None		Stadium: Stade 1er Novembre 1954; Referee: Rafik Achouri

27 December 2016 Round 10	MO Béjaïa	2–1	CA Batna	Béjaïa
17:00; Match rescheduled due to MO Béjaïa competing in the 2016 CAF Confederation Cup	Messadia 10'; Khadir 90'	Report; Live TV: None	Aribi 65'	Stadium: Stade de l'Unité Maghrébine; Referee: Amine Sekhraoui

18 November 2016 Round 12	MO Béjaïa	0–0	MC Oran	Béjaïa
16:00		Report; Live TV: EPTV Terrestre / TV Tamazight 4		Stadium: Stade de l'Unité Maghrébine; Referee: Lotfi Bekouassa

2 December 2016 Round 13	ES Sétif	4–2	MO Béjaïa	Sétif
16:00	Haddouche 5', 24'; Djabou 48' (pen.); Amokrane 66'	Report; Live TV: TV Tamazight 4 / Canal Algérie	Messadia 80', 90+3'	Stadium: Stade 8 Mai 1945; Referee: Mehdi Abid Charef

9 December 2016 Round 14	MO Béjaïa	1–1	JS Saoura	Béjaïa
16:00	Messadia 1'	Report; Live TV: None	Bencharif 48'	Stadium: Stade de l'Unité Maghrébine; Attendance: 0 (close doors); Referee: Lotfi Bekouassa

24 December 2016 Round 15	NA Hussein Dey	1–0	MO Béjaïa	Belouizdad
16:00	Khiat 11'	Report; Live TV: TV Tamazight 4		Stadium: August 20, 1955 Stadium; Referee: Mustapha Bessiri

14 February 2017 Round 16	MO Béjaïa	0–0	USM Alger	Béjaïa
16:00; Match rescheduled due to share some of their players in the African Cup and World Cup military		Soccerway report DZfoot report Live TV: None		Stadium: Stade de l'Unité Maghrébine; Referee: Mehdi Abid Charef

24 March 2017 Round 17	DRB Tadjenanet	1–1	MO Béjaïa	Tadjenanet
16:00; Match rescheduled due to share some of their players in the African Cup and World Cup military	Chibane 19' (pen.)	Report; Live TV: EPTV Terrestre / TV Tamazight 4	Messadia 29'	Stadium: Lahoua Smaïl Stadium; Referee: Hamza Bouslimani

4 February 2017 Round 18	MO Béjaïa	2–2	CS Constantine	Béjaïa
16:00	Lakhdari 43'; Messadia 90'	Report; Live TV: None	Belameiri 7'; Manucho 64'	Stadium: Stade de l'Unité Maghrébine; Referee: Amine Sekhraoui

9 February 2017 Round 19	CR Belouizdad	3–0	MO Béjaïa	Belouizdad
16:00	Hamia 55', 68' (pen.); Lakroum 90+1'	Report; Live TV: EPTV Terrestre / TV Tamazight 4		Stadium: Stade du 20 Août 1955; Referee: Fodil Oukil

31 March 2017 Round 20	MO Béjaïa	1–2	Olympique de Médéa	Béjaïa
16:00	Cheklam 67'	Report; Live TV: None	Boukhenchouche 33'; Saadou 83'	Stadium: Stade de l'Unité Maghrébine; Attendance: 0 (close doors); Referee: Rafik Achouri

23 February 2017 Round 21	RC Relizane	1–0	MO Béjaïa	Relizane
16:00	Zidane 36' (pen.)	Report; Live TV: Canal Algérie / TV Tamazight 4		Stadium: Stade Tahar Zoughari; Referee: Said Aouina

3 March 2017 Round 22	MO Béjaïa	3–0	JS Kabylie	Béjaïa
16:00	Belkacemi 56'; Benmelouka 67'; Berchiche 87' (o.g.)	Report; Live TV: None		Stadium: Stade de l'Unité Maghrébine; Attendance: 0 (close doors); Referee: Lotfi Bekouassa

25 April 2017 Round 23	MC Alger	4–1	MO Béjaïa	Algiers
18:00	Hachoud 34'; Zerdab 63'; Mansouri 80'; Chérif El-Ouazzani 87'	Report; Live TV: None	Bouchema 36'	Stadium: Stade du 5 Juillet; Referee: Rafik Achouri

17 March 2017 Round 24	MO Béjaïa	0–1	USM El Harrach	Béjaïa
16:00		Report; Live TV: None	Harrag 90+3'	Stadium: Stade de l'Unité Maghrébine; Attendance: 0 (close doors); Referee: Abderrezzak Arab

6 May 2017 Round 25	CA Batna	2–0	MO Béjaïa	Batna
16:00	Kherbache 11'; Behloul 72'	Report; Live TV: None		Stadium: Mustapha Seffouhi Stadium; Attendance: 0 (close doors); Referee: Lotfi Bekouassa

12 May 2017 Round 26	MO Béjaïa	1–1	USM Bel Abbès	Béjaïa
16:00	Belkacemi 45'	Report; Live TV: None	Korbiaa 52'	Stadium: Stade de l'Unité Maghrébine; Referee: Yazid Ibrir

20 May 2017 Round 27	MC Oran	2–1	MO Béjaïa	Oran
16:00	Chérif 11'; Bentiba 32'	Report; Live TV: None	Athmani 60'	Stadium: Ahmed Zabana Stadium; Referee: Merzak Halalchi

7 June 2017 Round 28	MO Béjaïa	0–3	ES Sétif	Béjaïa
17:00		Report; Live TV: None	Amokrane 35'; Rebiai 69'; Ziti 85'	Stadium: Stade de l'Unité Maghrébine; Referee: Mohamed Benabdellah

10 June 2017 Round 29	JS Saoura	3–0 (Note: Match awarded 3-0 by FA decision, the match JS Saoura-MO Béjaia, disputed, did not come to an end after the referee stopped the debates at the 52nd. and for good reason, the Béjaouis had only 6 players valid on the field.)	MO Béjaïa	Béchar
22:30	Saâd 15'; Zaidi 22'; Ghazali 28'	Report; Live TV: None		Stadium: August 20, 1955 Stadium

14 June 2017 Round 30	MO Béjaïa	1–1	NA Hussein Dey	Béjaïa
22:30	Touati 84'	Report; Live TV: None	Gasmi 71'	Stadium: Stade de l'Unité Maghrébine; Referee: Ramdane Oukil

== Algerian Cup ==
26 November 2016	MO Béjaïa	0–1	NA Hussein Dey	Sétif
14:45		Report; Live TV: None	51' Gasmi	Stadium: Stade 8 Mai 1945; Attendance: 0 (close doors); Referee: Boukhalfa, Zerhouni, Benali

== Confederation Cup ==
=== group stage ===
Pos	Team	Pld	W	D	L	GF	GA	GD	Pts	Qualification	TPM	MOB	MED	YAN
1	(Democratic Republic of the Congo) TP Mazembe	6	4	1	1	10	5	+5	13	Knockout stage	—	1–0	3–1	3–1
2	(Algeria) MO Béjaïa	6	2	2	2	2	2	0	8	Knockout stage	0–0	—	1–0	1–0
3	(Ghana) Medeama	6	2	2	2	8	8	0	8		3–2	0–0	—	3–1
4	(Tanzania) Young Africans	6	1	1	4	4	9	−5	4		0–1	1–0	1–1	—

Source: CAF
Rules for classification: Group stage tiebreakers

17 July 2016 Matchday 3	MO Béjaïa (Algeria)	0–0	(Democratic Republic of the Congo) TP Mazembe	Béjaïa
20:45 UTC+1		Report		Stadium: Stade de l'Unité Maghrébine; Referee: Joshua Bondo (Botswana)

27 July 2016 Matchday 4	TP Mazembe (Democratic Republic of the Congo)	1–0	(Algeria) MO Béjaïa	Lubumbashi
15:30 UTC+2	Kalaba 61'	Report		Stadium: Stade TP Mazembe; Referee: Eric Otogo-Castane (Gabon)

13 August 2016 Matchday 5	Young Africans (Tanzania)	1–0	(Algeria) MO Béjaïa	Dar es Salaam
16:00 UTC+3	Tambwe 3'	Report		Stadium: National Stadium; Referee: Bamlak Tessema Weyesa (Ethiopia)

23 August 2016 Matchday 6	MO Béjaïa (Algeria)	1–0	(Ghana) Medeama	Béjaïa
14:30 UTC+1	Betorangal 53'	Report		Stadium: Stade de l'Unité Maghrébine; Referee: Maguette N'Diaye (Senegal)

=== Semi-finals ===
18 September 2016 first leg	MO Béjaïa (Algeria)	0–0	(Morocco) FUS Rabat	Béjaïa
22:00 UTC+1	Nahiri 73'	Report	89' Rahal	Stadium: Stade de l'Unité Maghrébine; Referee: Denis Dembélé (Ivory Coast)

25 September 2016 second leg	FUS Rabat (Morocco)	1–1	(Algeria) MO Béjaïa	Rabat
22:00 UTC+1	Nahiri 73'	Report	89' Rahal	Stadium: Stade de FUS; Referee: Bakary Gassama (Gambia)

=== Final ===
29 October 2016 first leg	MO Béjaïa (Algeria)	1–1	(Democratic Republic of the Congo) TP Mazembe	Béjaïa
20:30 UTC+1	Yaya 66'	Report	43' (pen.) Bolingi	Stadium: Stade de l'Unité Maghrébine; Attendance: 15,000; Referee: Bernard Camille (Seychelles)

6 November 2016 second leg	TP Mazembe (Democratic Republic of the Congo)	4–1	(Algeria) MO Béjaïa	Lubumbashi
15:30 UTC+2	Bokadi 7'; Kalaba 44', 62'; Bolingi 77'	Report	75' Khadir	Stadium: Stade TP Mazembe; Attendance: 18,000; Referee: Malang Diedhiou (Senegal)

== Squad information ==
=== Playing statistics ===
No.	Pos	Nat	Player	Total		Ligue 1		Algerian Cup		Confederation Cup	
No.	Pos	Nat	Player	Apps	Goals	Apps	Goals	Apps	Goals	Apps	Goals
Goalkeepers
1	GK	(Algeria) ALG	Amara Daif	7	0	7	0	0	0	0	0
30	GK	(Algeria) ALG	Ammar Hamzaoui	1	0	1	0	0	0	0	0
16	GK	(Algeria) ALG	Chamseddine Rahmani	28	0	20	0	1	0	7	0
	GK	(Algeria) ALG	Yacine Sidi Salah	4	0	4	0	0	0	0	0
Defenders
21	DF	(Algeria) ALG	Adel Lakhdari	24	1	21	1	1	0	2	0
17	DF	(Algeria) ALG	Anis Mouhli	16	0	14	0	0	0	2	0
25	DF	(Algeria) ALG	Farid Cheklam	18	1	17	1	1	0	0	0
	DF	(Algeria) ALG	Yanis Bahri	3	0	3	0	0	0	0	0
23	DF	(Algeria) ALG	Sofiane Baouali	34	0	26	0	1	0	7	0
14	DF	(Algeria) ALG	Sofiane Khadir	26	3	18	1	1	1	7	1
13	DF	(Algeria) ALG	Zakaria Bencherifa	16	1	9	1	1	0	6	0
28	DF	(Algeria) ALG	Yacine Salhi	27	0	19	0	1	0	7	0
3	DF	(Algeria) ALG	Salim Benali	5	0	5	0	0	0	0	0
36	DF	(Algeria) ALG	Mounir Bordjah	5	0	5	0	0	0	0	0
27	DF	(Algeria) ALG	Amar Benmelouka	25	1	21	1	0	0	4	0
Midfielders
19	MF	(Algeria) ALG	Antar Boucherit	3	0	3	0	0	0	0	0
4	MF	(Algeria) ALG	Ismail Benettayeb	20	0	14	0	1	0	5	0
5	MF	(Algeria) ALG	Nassim Bouchema	11	0	11	0	0	0	0	0
15	MF	(Mali) MLI	Soumaila Sidibe	31	0	23	0	1	0	7	0
6	MF	(Algeria) ALG	Malek Ferhat	23	1	16	1	1	0	6	0
8	MF	(Algeria) ALG	Faouzi Rahal	34	1	25	0	1	0	8	1
	MF	(Algeria) ALG	Slimane Benamara	3	0	3	0	0	0	0	0
	MF	(Algeria) ALG	Walid Haroune	2	0	2	0	0	0	0	0
29	MF	(Algeria) ALG	Kamel Yesli	17	0	9	0	0	0	8	0
10	MF	(Algeria) ALG	Faouzi Yaya	18	1	14	0	0	0	4	1
18	MF	(Algeria) ALG	Mohamed Yassine Athmani	29	1	22	1	1	0	6	0
	MF	(Algeria) ALG	Oussama Aggar	5	0	5	0	0	0	0	0
Forwards
	FW	(Algeria) ALG	Youcef Touati	10	0	6	0	0	0	4	0
	FW	(Chad) CHA	Morgan Betorangal	15	3	7	2	1	0	7	1
9	FW	(Algeria) ALG	Hamza Boulemdaïs	9	0	9	0	0	0	0	0
7	FW	(Algeria) ALG	Ahmed Messadia	20	9	20	9	0	0	0	0
11	FW	(Algeria) ALG	Ismail Belkacemi	28	3	24	3	0	0	4	0
	FW	(Algeria) ALG	Said Benbelaid	4	0	4	0	0	0	0	0
	FW	(Algeria) ALG	Mohamed Nadjib Touati	5	1	5	1	0	0	0	0
Players transferred out during the season

Last updated: 26 November 2017

=== Goalscorers ===
Includes all competitive matches. The list is sorted alphabetically by surname when total goals are equal.

No.	Nat.	Player	Pos.	L 1	AC	CC 3	TOTAL
7	(Algeria)	Ahmed Messadia	FW	9	0	0	9
11	(Algeria)	Ismail Belkacemi	FW	3	0	0	3
	(Chad)	Morgan Betorangal	FW	2	0	1	3
14	(Algeria)	Sofiane Khadir	DF	2	0	1	3
	(Algeria)	Mohamed Nadjib Touati	FW	1	0	0	1
6	(Algeria)	Malek Ferhat	MF	1	0	0	1
18	(Algeria)	Mohamed Yassine Athmani	MF	1	0	0	1
13	(Algeria)	Zakaria Bencherifa	DF	1	0	0	1
27	(Algeria)	Amar Benmelouka	DF	1	0	0	1
21	(Algeria)	Adel Lakhdari	DF	1	0	0	1
25	(Algeria)	Farid Cheklam	DF	1	0	0	1
8	(Algeria)	Faouzi Rahal	MF	0	0	1	1
10	(Algeria)	Faouzi Yaya	MF	0	0	1	1
Own Goals				0	0	0	0
Totals				23	0	4	27

== Squad list ==
As of 15 January 2017. Note: Flags indicate national team as defined under FIFA eligibility rules; some limited exceptions apply. Players may hold more than one non-FIFA nationality.

No.	Pos.	Nation	Player
1	GK	ALG	Amara Daïf
3	DF	ALG	Salim Benali
4	MF	ALG	Ismail Bentayeb
5	MF	ALG	Nassim Bouchema
6	MF	ALG	Malek Ferhat
7	FW	ALG	Ahmed Messadia
8	MF	ALG	Faouzi Rahal
9	FW	ALG	Hamza Boulemdaïs
10	FW	ALG	Faouzi Yaya
11	FW	ALG	Ismail Belkacemi
13	DF	ALG	Zakaria Bencherifa
14	DF	ALG	Sofiane Khadir
15	MF	MLI	Soumaila Sidibe

No.	Pos.	Nation	Player
16	GK	ALG	Chamseddine Rahmani
17	DF	ALG	Yanis Mouhli
18	MF	ALG	Mohamed Yacine Athmani
19	MF	ALG	Antar Boucherit
21	DF	ALG	Adel Lakhdari
23	DF	ALG	Sofiane Baouali
25	DF	ALG	Farid Cheklam
27	DF	ALG	Amar Benmelouka
28	DF	ALG	Yacine Salhi
29	MF	ALG	Kamel Yesli
30	GK	ALG	Ammar Hamzaoui
36	DF	ALG	Mounir Bordjah

== Transfers ==
=== In ===
Date	Pos	Player	From club	Transfer fee	Source
6 June 2016	MF	(Algeria) Kamel Yesli	JS Kabylie	Undisclosed	
18 June 2016	FW	(Algeria) Ahmed Messadia	CS Constantine	Undisclosed	
25 June 2016	DF	(Algeria) Zakaria Bencherifa	CR Belouizdad	Undisclosed	
25 June 2016	DF	(Algeria) Amar Benmelouka	(France) Étoile Fréjus Saint-Raphaël	Undisclosed	
9 July 2016	MF	(Algeria) Faouzi Rahal	JS Kabylie	Undisclosed	
9 July 2016	MF	(France) Youcef Touati	(France) FC Chambly	Undisclosed	
21 July 2016	DF	(Algeria) Farid Cheklam	CS Constantine	Undisclosed	

=== Out ===
Date	Pos	Player	To club	Transfer fee	Source
4 June 2016	FW	(Algeria) Zahir Zerdab	MC Alger	Undisclosed	
6 June 2016	DF	(Algeria) Salim Benali	MC Oran	Undisclosed	
6 June 2016	DF	(Algeria) Amir Aguid	MC Oran	Undisclosed	
25 August 2016	FW	(Senegal) Mohamed Waliou Ndoye	(Tunisia) CS Sfaxien	Undisclosed	
