= MO Béjaïa in African football =

- Club: MO Béjaïa
- Most appearances: Chamseddine Rahmani 17
- Top scorer: Four players 2
- First entry: 2016 CAF Champions League
- Latest entry: 2016 CAF Confederation Cup

MO Béjaïa, an Algerian professional association football club, has gained entry to Confederation of African Football (CAF) competitions on several occasions. They have represented Algeria in the Champions League on one occasions, and the Confederation Cup on one occasions.

== History ==
MO Béjaïa whose team has regularly taken part in Confederation of African Football (CAF) competitions. Qualification for Algerian clubs is determined by a team's performance in its domestic league and cup competitions, MO Béjaïa have regularly qualified for the primary African competition, the African Cup, by winning the Ligue Professionnelle 1 or Runners–up. MO Béjaïa have also achieved African qualification via the Algerian Cup and have played in the CAF Confederation Cup. After the Algerian Ligue Professionnelle 1 runner-up in the 2014–15 season and winning the Algerian Cup. Within the participation for the first time in a continental competition in the CAF Champions League, The first match was against Ashanti Gold and ended in defeat with a single goal, and against the same club in the second leg, MO Béjaïa won his first victory and the first goal was own goal scored by Hudu Yakubu and by a player from MO Béjaïa Sofiane Khadir and the match ended with a score of 3–1 and qualified for the next round. The team's march was stopped in the second round after losing against Zamalek with 3–1 on aggregate. Then they moved to the CAF Confederation Cup where MO Béjaïa faced the Tunisian giant Espérance de Tunis in the Play-off round and they won. to qualify for the group stage and putting him in group A with Young Africans, Medeama and TP Mazembe where MO Béjaïa ranked second to face in the semi-final FUS Rabat and after the two matches ended with a draw MO Béjaïa qualified for the final for the first time according to Away goals rule. Where did face TP Mazembe who with his experience won the final with 5–2 on aggregate.

== CAF competitions ==
MO Béjaïa results in CAF competition
Season	Competition	Round	Opposition	Home	Away	Aggregate
2016	Champions League	Preliminary round	(Ghana) Ashanti Gold	3–1	0–1	3–2
2016	Champions League	First round	(Tunisia) Club Africain	2–0	0–1	2–1
2016	Champions League	Second round	(Egypt) Zamalek	1–1	0–2	1–3
2016	Confederation Cup	Play-off round	(Tunisia) Espérance de Tunis	0–0	1–1	1–1 (a)
2016	Confederation Cup	Group stage	(Tanzania) Young Africans	1–0	0–1	2nd place
2016	Confederation Cup	Group stage	(Ghana) Medeama	1–0	0–0	2nd place
2016	Confederation Cup	Group stage	(Democratic Republic of the Congo) TP Mazembe	0–0	0–1	2nd place
2016	Confederation Cup	Semifinals	(Morocco) FUS Rabat	0–0	1–1	1–1 (a)
2016	Confederation Cup	Final	(Democratic Republic of the Congo) TP Mazembe	1–1	1–4	2–5

== Statistics ==
=== By season ===
Information correct as of 6 November 2016.
Key

- Pld = Played
- W = Games won
- D = Games drawn
- L = Games lost
- F = Goals for
- A = Goals against
- Grp = Group stage
- PR = Preliminary round
- R1 = First round
- R2 = Second round
- SR16 = Second Round of 16
- R16 = Round of 16
- QF = Quarter-final
- SF = Semi-final

Key to colours and symbols:

W	Winners
RU	Runners-up

MO Béjaïa record in African football by season
Season	Competition	Pld	W	D	L	GF	GA	GD	Round
2016	CAF Champions League	6	2	1	3	6	6	+0	R2
2016	CAF Confederation Cup	12	2	7	3	6	9	−3	RU
Total		18	4	8	6	12	15	−3	

=== By competition ===
==== In Africa ====
As of 6 November 2016:

CAF competitions
Competition	Seasons	Played	Won	Drawn	Lost	Goals For	Goals Against	Last season played
Champions League	1	6	2	1	3	6	6	2016
CAF Confederation Cup	1	12	2	7	3	6	9	2016
Total	2	18	4	8	6	12	15	

=== Finals ===
Matches won after regular time (90 minutes of play), extra-time (aet) or a penalty shootout (p) are highlighted in green, while losses are highlighted in red.

29 October 2016 Confederation Cup (1L)	MO Béjaïa (Algeria)	1–1	(Democratic Republic of the Congo) TP Mazembe	Béjaïa
20:30 UTC+1	Yaya 66'	Report	43' (pen.) Bolingi	Stadium: Stade de l'Unité Maghrébine; Attendance: 15,000; Referee: Bernard Camille (Seychelles)

6 November 2016 Confederation Cup (2L)	TP Mazembe (Democratic Republic of the Congo)	4–1	(Algeria) MO Béjaïa	Lubumbashi
15:30 UTC+2	Bokadi 7'; Kalaba 44', 62'; Bolingi 77'	Report	75' Khadir	Stadium: Stade TP Mazembe; Attendance: 18,000; Referee: Malang Diedhiou (Senegal)

== Statistics by country ==
Statistics correct as of game against TP Mazembe on November 6, 2016

=== CAF competitions ===
Country	Club	P	W	D	L	GF	GA	GD
(Democratic Republic of the Congo) DR Congo	TP Mazembe	4	0	2	2	2	6	−4
Subtotal		4	0	2	2	2	6	−4
Egypt	Zamalek	2	0	1	1	1	3	−2
Subtotal		2	0	1	1	1	3	−2
Ghana	Ashanti Gold	2	1	0	1	3	2	+1
Ghana	Medeama	2	1	1	0	1	0	+1
Subtotal		4	2	1	1	4	2	+2
Morocco	FUS Rabat	2	0	2	0	1	1	+0
Subtotal		2	0	2	0	1	1	+0
Tanzania	Young Africans	2	1	0	1	1	1	+0
Subtotal		2	1	0	1	1	1	+0
Tunisia	Espérance	2	0	2	0	1	1	+0
Tunisia	Club Africain	2	1	0	1	2	1	+1
Subtotal		4	1	2	1	3	2	+1
Total		18	4	8	6	12	15	−3

== African competitions goals ==
Statistics correct as of game against TP Mazembe on November 6, 2016

Position	Player	TOTAL	CCL	CCC	SC
1	(Chad) Morgan Betorangal	2	1	1	–
=	(Senegal) Mohamed Waliou Ndoye	2	1	1	–
=	(Algeria) Faouzi Yaya	2	1	1	–
=	(Algeria) Sofiane Khadir	2	1	1	–
5	(Algeria) Okacha Hamzaoui	1	1	–	–
=	(Algeria) Yacine Salhi	1	–	1	–
=	(Algeria) Faouzi Rahal	1	–	1	–
=	Own Goals	1	1	–	–
Totals		12	6	6	–

== List of All-time appearances ==
This List of All-time appearances for MO Béjaïa in African competitions contains football players who have played for MO Béjaïa in African football competitions and have managed to accrue 10 or more appearances.

Gold Still playing competitive football in MO Béjaïa.

#	Name	Position	CL1	CCC	SC	TOTAL	Date of first cap	Debut against	Date of last cap	Final match against
1	(Algeria) Chamseddine Rahmani	GK	6	11	–	17	14 Feb 2016	Ashanti Gold	6 Nov 2016	TP Mazembe
2	(Mali) Soumaila Sidibe	DM / CB	4	10	–	14	14 Feb 2016	Ashanti Gold	6 Nov 2016	TP Mazembe
=	(Algeria) Mohamed Yassine Athmani	AM	4	10	–	14	14 Feb 2016	Ashanti Gold	6 Nov 2016	TP Mazembe
=	(Algeria) Sofiane Baouali	RB	5	9	–	14	14 Feb 2016	Ashanti Gold	6 Nov 2016	TP Mazembe
=	(Algeria) Sofiane Khadir	RB	4	10	–	14	28 Feb 2016	Ashanti Gold	6 Nov 2016	TP Mazembe
=	(Chad) Morgan Betorangal	LB / LM / CM	5	9	–	14	14 Feb 2016	Ashanti Gold	6 Nov 2016	TP Mazembe
=	(Algeria) Yacine Salhi	LB	3	11	–	14	14 Feb 2016	Ashanti Gold	6 Nov 2016	TP Mazembe
8	(Algeria) Malek Ferhat	DM	5	8	–	13	28 Feb 2016	Ashanti Gold	6 Nov 2016	TP Mazembe
9	(Algeria) Faouzi Yaya	AM	4	6	–	10	28 Feb 2016	Ashanti Gold	6 Nov 2016	TP Mazembe
=	(Algeria) Ismail Bentayeb	DM	2	8	–	10	14 Feb 2016	Ashanti Gold	6 Nov 2016	TP Mazembe
