= 2016 CAF Confederation Cup group stage =

- Dates: 17 June – 24 August 2016

Tournament statistics
- Matches played: 24
- Goals scored: 55 (2.29 per match)

The 2016 CAF Confederation Cup group stage was played from 17 June to 24 August 2016. A total of eight teams competed in the group stage to decide the four places in the knockout stage of the 2016 CAF Confederation Cup.

== Draw ==
The draw for the group stage was held on 24 May 2016, 14:30 EET (UTC+2), at the CAF headquarters in Cairo, Egypt. The eight teams were drawn into two groups of four.

The eight teams, all winners of the play-off round, were seeded by their performances in the CAF competitions for the previous five seasons (CAF 5-year ranking points shown in parentheses): two teams in Pot 1 and six teams in Pot 2. One team from Pot 1 and three teams from Pot 2 were drawn into each group, with each team then assigned a random "position" in the group to determine the fixtures.

Pot	Pot 1	Pot 2
Teams	(Democratic Republic of the Congo) TP Mazembe (52 pts); (Tunisia) Étoile du Sahel (27 pts)	(Morocco) FUS Rabat (3 pts); (Algeria) MO Béjaïa; (Libya) Al-Ahli Tripoli; (Tanzania) Young Africans; (Ghana) Medeama; (Morocco) Kawkab Marrakech

== Format ==
In the group stage, each group was played on a home-and-away round-robin basis. The winners and runners-up of each group advanced to the semi-finals.

=== Tiebreakers ===
The teams were ranked according to points (3 points for a win, 1 point for a draw, 0 points for a loss). If tied on points, tiebreakers would be applied in the following order (Regulations III. 20 & 21):

1. Number of points obtained in games between the teams concerned;
2. Goal difference in games between the teams concerned;
3. Goals scored in games between the teams concerned;
4. Away goals scored in games between the teams concerned;
5. If, after applying criteria 1 to 4 to several teams, two teams still have an equal ranking, criteria 1 to 4 are reapplied exclusively to the matches between the two teams in question to determine their final rankings. If this procedure does not lead to a decision, criteria 6 to 9 apply;
6. Goal difference in all games;
7. Goals scored in all games;
8. Away goals scored in all games;
9. Drawing of lots.

== Schedule ==
The schedule of each matchday was as follows.

Matchday	Dates	Matches
Matchday 1	17–19 June 2016	Team 1 vs. Team 2, Team 3 vs. Team 4
Matchday 2	28–29 June 2016	Team 2 vs. Team 3, Team 4 vs. Team 1
Matchday 3	15–17 July 2016	Team 1 vs. Team 3, Team 2 vs. Team 4
Matchday 4	26–27 July 2016	Team 3 vs. Team 1, Team 4 vs. Team 2
Matchday 5	12–14 August 2016	Team 2 vs. Team 1, Team 4 vs. Team 3
Matchday 6	23–24 August 2016	Team 3 vs. Team 2, Team 1 vs. Team 4

== Groups ==
=== Group A ===
Pos	Team	Pld	W	D	L	GF	GA	GD	Pts	Qualification	TPM	MOB	MED	YAN
1	(Democratic Republic of the Congo) TP Mazembe	6	4	1	1	10	5	+5	13	Knockout stage	—	1–0	3–1	3–1
2	(Algeria) MO Béjaïa	6	2	2	2	2	2	0	8	Knockout stage	0–0	—	1–0	1–0
3	(Ghana) Medeama	6	2	2	2	8	8	0	8		3–2	0–0	—	3–1
4	(Tanzania) Young Africans	6	1	1	4	4	9	−5	4		0–1	1–0	1–1	—

Source: CAF
Rules for classification: Group stage tiebreakers
19 June 2016
15:30 UTC+2

TP Mazembe (Democratic Republic of the Congo)	3–1	(Ghana) Medeama
Kalaba 16', 69'; Coulibaly 45'	Report	Akowuah 2'

Stade TP Mazembe, Lubumbashi
Referee: Bernard Camille (Seychelles)
19 June 2016
22:15 UTC+1

MO Béjaïa (Algeria)	1–0	(Tanzania) Young Africans
Salhi 20'	Report

Stade de l'Unité Maghrébine, Béjaïa
Referee: Bouchaïb El Ahrach (Morocco)

28 June 2016
16:00 UTC+3

Young Africans (Tanzania)	0–1	(Democratic Republic of the Congo) TP Mazembe
	Report	Bokadi 73'

National Stadium, Dar es Salaam
Referee: Janny Sikazwe (Zambia)
29 June 2016
15:00 UTC+0

Medeama (Ghana)	0–0	(Algeria) MO Béjaïa
	Report

Sekondi-Takoradi Stadium, Sekondi-Takoradi
Referee: Daniel Bennett (South Africa)

16 July 2016
16:00 UTC+3

Young Africans (Tanzania)	1–1	(Ghana) Medeama
Ngoma 2'	Report	Ofori 17'

National Stadium, Dar es Salaam
Referee: Ibrahim Nour El Din (Egypt)
17 July 2016
20:45 UTC+1

MO Béjaïa (Algeria)	0–0	(Democratic Republic of the Congo) TP Mazembe
	Report

Stade de l'Unité Maghrébine, Béjaïa
Referee: Joshua Bondo (Botswana)

26 July 2016
15:00 UTC+0

Medeama (Ghana)	3–1	(Tanzania) Young Africans
Amoah 7'; Mohammed 22', 36'	Report	Msuva 24' (pen.)

Sekondi-Takoradi Stadium, Sekondi-Takoradi
Referee: Rédouane Jiyed (Morocco)
27 July 2016
15:30 UTC+2

TP Mazembe (Democratic Republic of the Congo)	1–0	(Algeria) MO Béjaïa
Kalaba 61'	Report

Stade TP Mazembe, Lubumbashi
Referee: Eric Otogo-Castane (Gabon)

13 August 2016
16:00 UTC+3

Young Africans (Tanzania)	1–0	(Algeria) MO Béjaïa
Kamusoko 3'	Report

National Stadium, Dar es Salaam
Referee: Bamlak Tessema Weyesa (Ethiopia)
14 August 2016
15:00 UTC+0

Medeama (Ghana)	3–2	(Democratic Republic of the Congo) TP Mazembe
Agyei 32'; Sarpong 59' (pen.); Donsu 90+4'	Report	Bolingi 61'; Kalaba 72'

Sekondi-Takoradi Stadium, Sekondi-Takoradi
Referee: Davies Omweno (Kenya)

23 August 2016
14:30 UTC+2

TP Mazembe (Democratic Republic of the Congo)	3–1	(Tanzania) Young Africans
Bolingi 28'; Kalaba 55', 63'	Report	Tambwe 75'

Stade TP Mazembe, Lubumbashi
Referee: Hélder Martins de Carvalho (Angola)
23 August 2016
14:30 UTC+1

MO Béjaïa (Algeria)	1–0	(Ghana) Medeama
Betorangal 53'	Report

Stade de l'Unité Maghrébine, Béjaïa
Referee: Maguette N'Diaye (Senegal)

=== Group B ===
Pos	Team	Pld	W	D	L	GF	GA	GD	Pts	Qualification	FUS	ESS	KAC	AHL
1	(Morocco) FUS Rabat	6	3	3	0	9	4	+5	12	Knockout stage	—	0–0	3–1	1–0
2	(Tunisia) Étoile du Sahel	6	3	2	1	9	4	+5	11	Knockout stage	1–1	—	3–1	3–0
3	(Morocco) Kawkab Marrakech	6	2	1	3	9	13	−4	7		1–3	2–1	—	2–2
4	(Libya) Al-Ahli Tripoli	6	0	2	4	4	10	−6	2		1–1	0–1	1–2	—

Source: CAF
Rules for classification: Group stage tiebreakers
17 June 2016
22:30 UTC+0

Kawkab Marrakech (Morocco)	2–1	(Tunisia) Étoile du Sahel
Kouyaté 74'; Amimi 86'	Report	Lahmar 61' (pen.)

Stade de Marrakech, Marrakech
Referee: Denis Dembélé (Ivory Coast)
19 June 2016
22:00 UTC+0

FUS Rabat (Morocco)	1–0	(Libya) Al-Ahli Tripoli
Nahiri 47'	Report

Stade de FUS, Rabat
Referee: Malang Diedhiou (Senegal)

28 June 2016
22:00 UTC+1

Al-Ahli Tripoli (Libya)	1–2	(Morocco) Kawkab Marrakech
Al Ghanodi 38' (pen.)	Report	El Fakih 34' (pen.); Luiz Jeferson 65'

Stade Chedli Zouiten, Tunis (Tunisia) (Note: Teams from Libya were not allowed to host their home matches in their country due to security concerns.)
Referee: Mohamed Benouza (Algeria)
29 June 2016
22:00 UTC+1

Étoile du Sahel (Tunisia)	1–1	(Morocco) FUS Rabat
Akaïchi 3'	Report	Benjelloun 68'

Stade Olympique de Sousse, Sousse
Referee: Gehad Grisha (Egypt)

15 July 2016
21:00 UTC+1

Kawkab Marrakech (Morocco)	1–3	(Morocco) FUS Rabat
El Fakih 45+2' (pen.)	Report	El Gnaoui 22' (pen.); Benjelloun 48'; Fouzair 67'

Stade de Marrakech, Marrakech
Referee: Joseph Lamptey (Ghana)
16 July 2016
20:30 UTC+1

Étoile du Sahel (Tunisia)	3–0	(Libya) Al-Ahli Tripoli
Brigui 58', 68'; Akaïchi 78'	Report

Stade Olympique de Sousse, Sousse
Referee: Sidi Alioum (Cameroon)

26 July 2016
19:00 UTC+1

Al-Ahli Tripoli (Libya)	0–1	(Tunisia) Étoile du Sahel
	Report	Akaïchi 69'

Stade Chedli Zouiten, Tunis (Tunisia)
Referee: Victor Gomes (South Africa)
27 July 2016
21:30 UTC+1

FUS Rabat (Morocco)	3–1	(Morocco) Kawkab Marrakech
Nahiri 6', 8'; El Bassil 17'	Report	Sekkat 90'

Stade de FUS, Rabat
Referee: El Fadil Mohamed (Sudan)

12 August 2016
18:30 UTC+1

Al-Ahli Tripoli (Libya)	1–1	(Morocco) FUS Rabat
Al Laafi 74'	Report	Njie 63'

Stade Chedli Zouiten, Tunis (Tunisia)
Referee: Janny Sikazwe (Zambia)
12 August 2016
21:00 UTC+1

Étoile du Sahel (Tunisia)	3–1	(Morocco) Kawkab Marrakech
Msakni 15', 46'; Lahmar 19'	Report	Chagou 61'

Stade Olympique de Sousse, Sousse
Referee: Mahamadou Keita (Mali)

23 August 2016
20:30 UTC+1

FUS Rabat (Morocco)	0–0	(Tunisia) Étoile du Sahel
	Report

Stade de FUS, Rabat
Referee: Eric Otogo-Castane (Gabon)
24 August 2016
20:30 UTC+1

Kawkab Marrakech (Morocco)	2–2	(Libya) Al-Ahli Tripoli
Amimi 37'; Chagou 62' (pen.)	Report	Al Triki 38' (pen.); Salih 48'

Stade de Marrakech, Marrakech
Referee: Mahmoud Ashour (Egypt)
