= 2016 CAF Confederation Cup final =

- Event: 2016 CAF Confederation Cup
MO Béjaïa	TP Mazembe
(Algeria)	(Democratic Republic of the Congo)
2	5
- on aggregate

First leg
MO Béjaïa	TP Mazembe
1	1
- Date: 29 October 2016
- Venue: Stade Mustapha Tchaker, Blida
- Referee: Bernard Camille (Seychelles)
- Attendance: 30,000

Second leg
TP Mazembe	MO Béjaïa
4	1
- Date: 6 November 2016
- Venue: Stade TP Mazembe, Lubumbashi
- Referee: Malang Diedhiou (Senegal)
- Attendance: 18,000

The 2016 CAF Confederation Cup final was the final of the 2016 CAF Confederation Cup, the 13th edition of the CAF Confederation Cup, Africa's secondary club football competition organized by the Confederation of African Football (CAF).

The final was contested in two-legged home-and-away format between MO Béjaïa of Algeria and TP Mazembe of the Democratic Republic of the Congo. The first leg was hosted by MO Béjaïa at the Stade Mustapha Tchaker in Blida on 29 October 2016, while the second leg was hosted by TP Mazembe at the Stade TP Mazembe in Lubumbashi on 6 November 2016. The winner earned the right to play in the 2017 CAF Super Cup against the winner of the 2016 CAF Champions League.

TP Mazembe defeated MO Béjaïa 5–2 on aggregate to win the competition for the first time in its history.

== Road to final ==
Note: In all results below, the score of the finalist is given first (H: home; A: away).

(Algeria) MO Béjaïa				Round	(Democratic Republic of the Congo) TP Mazembe			
Champions League
Opponent	Agg.	1st leg	2nd leg	Qualifying rounds	Opponent	Agg.	1st leg	2nd leg
(Ghana) Ashanti Gold	3–2	0–1 (A)	3–1 (H)	Preliminary round	Bye			
(Tunisia) Club Africain	2–1	0–1 (A)	2–0 (H)	First round	(Ethiopia) Saint George	3–2	2–2 (A)	1–0 (H)
(Egypt) Zamalek	1–3	0–2 (A)	1–1 (H)	Second round	(Morocco) Wydad Casablanca	1–3	0–2 (A)	1–1 (H)
Confederation Cup
(Tunisia) Espérance de Tunis	1–1 (a)	0–0 (H)	1–1 (A)	Play-off round	(Tunisia) Stade Gabèsien	2–2 (a)	1–0 (H)	1–2 (A)
Opponent	Result			Group stage	Opponent	Result		
(Tanzania) Young Africans	1–0 (H)			Matchday 1	(Ghana) Medeama	3–1 (H)		
(Ghana) Medeama	0–0 (A)			Matchday 2	(Tanzania) Young Africans	1–0 (A)		
(Democratic Republic of the Congo) TP Mazembe	0–0 (H)			Matchday 3	(Algeria) MO Béjaïa	0–0 (A)		
(Democratic Republic of the Congo) TP Mazembe	0–1 (A)			Matchday 4	(Algeria) MO Béjaïa	1–0 (H)		
(Tanzania) Young Africans	0–1 (A)			Matchday 5	(Ghana) Medeama	2–3 (A)		
(Ghana) Medeama	1–0 (H)			Matchday 6	(Tanzania) Young Africans	3–1 (H)		
Group A runner-up: Pos / Team / Pld / Pts; 1 / (Democratic Republic of the Congo) TP Mazembe / 6 / 13; 2 / (Algeria) MO Béjaïa / 6 / 8; 3 / (Ghana) Medeama / 6 / 8; 4 / (Tanzania) Young Africans / 6 / 4; Source: CAF				Final standings	Group A winner: Pos / Team / Pld / Pts; 1 / (Democratic Republic of the Congo) TP Mazembe / 6 / 13; 2 / (Algeria) MO Béjaïa / 6 / 8; 3 / (Ghana) Medeama / 6 / 8; 4 / (Tanzania) Young Africans / 6 / 4; Source: CAF			
Opponent	Agg.	1st leg	2nd leg	Knockout stage	Opponent	Agg.	1st leg	2nd leg
(Morocco) FUS Rabat	1–1 (a)	0–0 (H)	1–1 (A)	Semifinals	(Tunisia) Étoile du Sahel	1–1 (a)	1–1 (A)	0–0 (H)

== Rules ==
The final was played on a home-and-away two-legged basis. If the aggregate score was tied after the second leg, the away goals rule would be applied, and if still tied, extra time would not be played, and the penalty shoot-out would be used to determine the winner (Regulations III. 26 & 27).

== Matches ==
=== First leg ===
29 October 2016
20:30 UTC+1

MO Béjaïa (Algeria)	1–1	(Democratic Republic of the Congo) TP Mazembe
Yaya 66'	Report	Bolingi 43' (pen.)

Stade Mustapha Tchaker, Blida
Attendance: 30,000
Referee: Bernard Camille (Seychelles)

MO Béjaïa	TP Mazembe

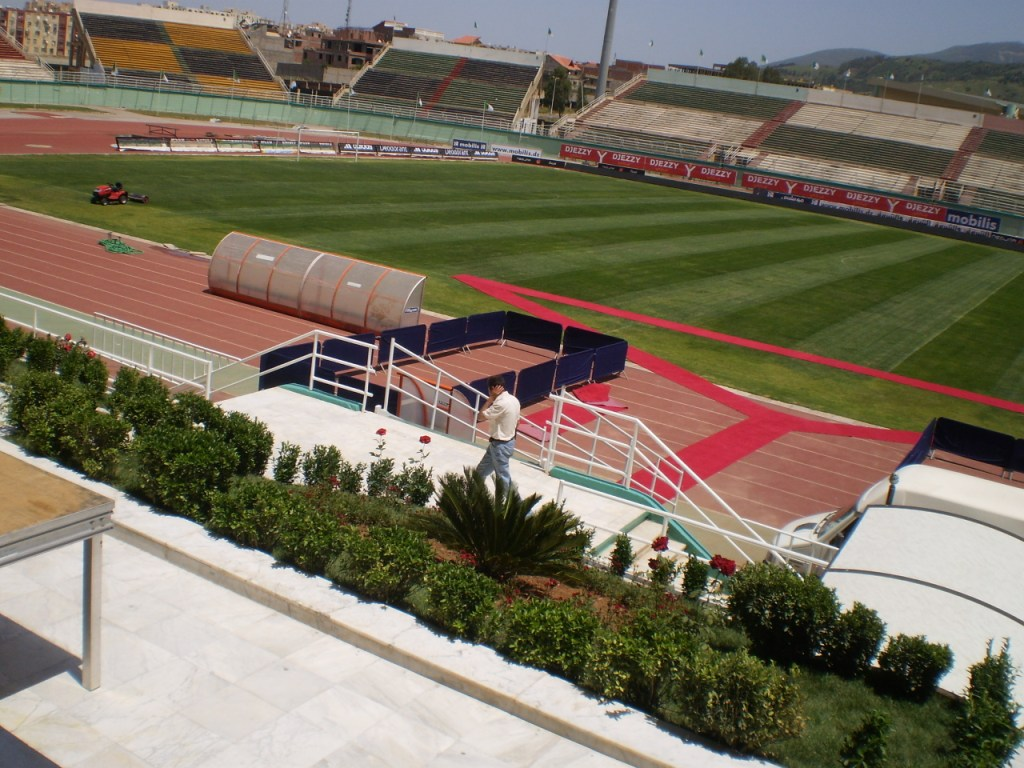
Stade Mustapha Tchaker in Blida, Algeria, hosted the first leg.

Assistant referees:
Hensley Danny Petrousse (Seychelles)
Eldrick Adelaide (Seychelles)
Fourth official:

=== Second leg ===
6 November 2016
15:30 UTC+2

TP Mazembe (Democratic Republic of the Congo)	4–1	(Algeria) MO Béjaïa
Bokadi 7'; Kalaba 44', 62'; Bolingi 77'	Report	Khadir 75'

Stade TP Mazembe, Lubumbashi
Attendance: 18,000
Referee: Malang Diedhiou (Senegal)

TP Mazembe	MO Béjaïa

Assistant referees:
Djibril Camara (Senegal)
El Hadji Malick Samba (Senegal)
Fourth official:
Daouda Gueye (Senegal)
