= 2016 CAF Confederation Cup knockout stage =

The 2016 CAF Confederation Cup knockout stage was played from 17 September to 6 November 2016. A total of four teams competed in the knockout stage to decide the champions of the 2016 CAF Confederation Cup.

== Qualified teams ==
The winners and runners-up of each of the two groups in the group stage qualified for the knockout stage.

Group	Winners	Runners-up
A	(Democratic Republic of the Congo) TP Mazembe	(Algeria) MO Béjaïa
B	(Morocco) FUS Rabat	(Tunisia) Étoile du Sahel

== Format ==
In the knockout stage, the four teams played a single-elimination tournament. Each tie was played on a home-and-away two-legged basis. If the aggregate score was tied after the second leg, the away goals rule would be applied, and if still tied, extra time would not be played, and the penalty shoot-out would be used to determine the winner (Regulations III. 26 & 27).

== Schedule ==
The schedule of each round was as follows.

Round	First leg	Second leg
Semi-finals	16–18 September 2016	23–25 September 2016
Final	28–30 October 2016	4–6 November 2016

== Bracket ==
The bracket of the knockout stage was determined as follows:

- Semi-finals: (group winners host second legs)
  - SF1: Winner Group A vs. Runner-up Group B
  - SF2: Winner Group B vs. Runner-up Group A
- Final: Winner SF1 vs. Winner SF2 (order of legs decided by draw)

Semi-finals
1	(Algeria) MO Béjaïa (a)	0	1	1
4	(Morocco) FUS Rabat	0	1	1
3	(Tunisia) Étoile du Sahel	1	0	1
2	(Democratic Republic of the Congo) TP Mazembe (a)	1	0	1

Final
(Algeria) MO Béjaïa	1	1	2
(Democratic Republic of the Congo) TP Mazembe	1	4	5

== Semi-finals ==
In the semi-finals, the group A winners played the group B runners-up, and the group B winners played the group A runners-up, with the group winners hosting the second leg.

Team 1	Agg.	Team 2	1st leg	2nd leg
Étoile du Sahel (Tunisia)	1–1 (a)	(Democratic Republic of the Congo) TP Mazembe	1–1	0–0
MO Béjaïa (Algeria)	1–1 (a)	(Morocco) FUS Rabat	0–0	1–1

17 September 2016
22:00 UTC+1

Étoile du Sahel (Tunisia)	1–1	(Democratic Republic of the Congo) TP Mazembe
Lahmar 20'	Report	Assalé 52'

Stade Olympique de Sousse, Sousse
Referee: El Fadil Mohamed (Sudan)
25 September 2016
15:30 UTC+2

TP Mazembe (Democratic Republic of the Congo)	0–0	(Tunisia) Étoile du Sahel
	Report

Stade TP Mazembe, Lubumbashi
Referee: Janny Sikazwe (Zambia)

1–1 on aggregate. TP Mazembe won on away goals.

18 September 2016
22:00 UTC+1

MO Béjaïa (Algeria)	0–0	(Morocco) FUS Rabat
	Report

Stade de l'Unité Maghrébine, Béjaïa
Referee: Denis Dembélé (Ivory Coast)
25 September 2016
22:00 UTC+1

FUS Rabat (Morocco)	1–1	(Algeria) MO Béjaïa
Nahiri 73'	Report	Rehal 89'

Stade de FUS, Rabat
Referee: Bakary Gassama (Gambia)

1–1 on aggregate. MO Béjaïa won on away goals.

== Final ==
In the final, the two semi-final winners played each other, with the order of legs decided by an additional draw held after the group stage draw.

Team 1	Agg.	Team 2	1st leg	2nd leg
MO Béjaïa (Algeria)	2–5	(Democratic Republic of the Congo) TP Mazembe	1–1	1–4

29 October 2016
20:30 UTC+1

MO Béjaïa (Algeria)	1–1	(Democratic Republic of the Congo) TP Mazembe
Yaya 66'	Report	Bolingi 43' (pen.)

Stade Mustapha Tchaker, Blida
Attendance: 30,000
Referee: Bernard Camille (Seychelles)
6 November 2016
15:30 UTC+2

TP Mazembe (Democratic Republic of the Congo)	4–1	(Algeria) MO Béjaïa
Bokadi 7'; Kalaba 44', 62'; Bolingi 77'	Report	Khadir 75'

Stade TP Mazembe, Lubumbashi
Attendance: 18,000
Referee: Malang Diedhiou (Senegal)

TP Mazembe won 5–2 on aggregate.
