= Gnagbo =

Gnagbo is a surname. Notable people with the surname include:

- Ange Pacôme Gnagbo (born 1991), Ivorian football midfielder
- Joseff Gnagbo (born c. 1974), Ivorian-born Welsh activist
