= 2016 CAF Confederation Cup =

International football competition in Africa

2016 Orange CAF Confederation Cup

Tournament details
- Dates: 12 February – 6 November 2016
- Teams: 51+8 (from 39 associations)

Final positions
- Champions: (Democratic Republic of the Congo) TP Mazembe (1st title)
- Runners-up: (Algeria) MO Béjaïa

Tournament statistics
- Matches played: 128
- Goals scored: 294 (2.3 per match)
- Top scorer: (Zambia) Rainford Kalaba (7 goals)

The 2016 CAF Confederation Cup (officially the 2016 Orange CAF Confederation Cup for sponsorship reasons) was the 13th edition of the CAF Confederation Cup, Africa's secondary club football competition organized by the Confederation of African Football (CAF).

TP Mazembe defeated MO Béjaïa in the final to win their first CAF Confederation Cup title, and earned the right to play against the winners of the 2016 CAF Champions League in the 2017 CAF Super Cup. Étoile du Sahel were the defending champions, and after qualifying for the 2016 CAF Champions League, they entered the 2016 CAF Confederation Cup after they lost in the Champions League second round, but were eliminated in the semi-finals.

== Association team allocation ==
All 56 CAF member associations might enter the CAF Champions League, with the 12 highest ranked associations according to their CAF 5-year ranking eligible to enter two teams in the competition. The title holders could also enter. As a result, theoretically a maximum of 69 teams could enter the tournament (plus eight teams eliminated from the CAF Champions League which enter the play-off round) – although this level had never been reached.

For the 2016 CAF Confederation Cup, the CAF used the 2010–2014 CAF 5-year ranking, which calculates points for each entrant association based on their clubs’ performance over those 5 years in the CAF Champions League and CAF Confederation Cup. The criteria for points are the following:

	CAF Champions League	CAF Confederation Cup
Winner	5 points	4 points
Runner-up	4 points	3 points
Losing semi-finalists	3 points	2 points
3rd place in groups	2 points	1 point
4th place in groups	1 point	1 point

The points are multiplied by a coefficient according to the year as follows:

- 2014 – 5
- 2013 – 4
- 2012 – 3
- 2011 – 2
- 2010 – 1

== Teams ==
The following 59 teams from 39 associations entered the competition.

Teams in bold received a bye to the first round. The other teams entered the preliminary round.

Associations are shown according to their 2010–2014 CAF 5-year ranking – those with a ranking score have their rank and score indicated.

Association	Team	Qualifying method
Associations eligible to enter two teams (Ranked 1–12)
Tunisia (1st – 105 pts)	**Espérance de Tunis**	2014–15 Tunisian Ligue Professionnelle 1 third place
Tunisia (1st – 105 pts)	Stade Gabèsien	2014–15 Tunisian Cup runner-up
Egypt (2nd – 81 pts)	**ENPPI**	2014–15 Egyptian Premier League third place
Egypt (2nd – 81 pts)	Misr Lel Makkasa	2014–15 Egyptian Premier League fourth place
(Democratic Republic of the Congo) DR Congo (3rd – 63 pts)	**CS Don Bosco**	2014–15 Linafoot third place
(Democratic Republic of the Congo) DR Congo (3rd – 63 pts)	FC Saint-Éloi Lupopo	2015 Coupe du Congo winner
Algeria (4th – 44 pts)	MC Oran	2014–15 Algerian Ligue Professionnelle 1 third place
Algeria (4th – 44 pts)	**CS Constantine**	2014–15 Algerian Ligue Professionnelle 1 fifth place
Sudan (5th – 33 pts)	**Al-Ahly Shendi**	2015 Sudan Premier League third place
Sudan (5th – 33 pts)	Khartoum	2015 Sudan Premier League fourth place
(Ivory Coast) Ivory Coast (6th – 30 pts)	SC Gagnoa	2014–15 Côte d'Ivoire Ligue 1 third place
(Ivory Coast) Ivory Coast (6th – 30 pts)	Africa Sports	2015 Coupe de Côte d'Ivoire de football winner
Morocco (7th – 29 pts)	Kawkab Marrakech	2014–15 Botola third place
Morocco (7th – 29 pts)	**FUS Rabat**	2015 Coupe du Trône runner-up
Cameroon (T-8th – 26 pts)	New Star de Douala	2015 Elite One third place
Cameroon (T-8th – 26 pts)	UMS de Loum	2015 Cameroonian Cup winner
(Republic of the Congo) Congo (T-8th – 26 pts)	Vita Club Mokanda	2015 Congo Premier League sixth place before abandoned
(Republic of the Congo) Congo (T-8th – 26 pts)	Diables Noirs	2015 Coupe du Congo winner
Mali (T-8th – 26 pts)	USFAS Bamako	2014–15 Malian Première Division third place
Mali (T-8th – 26 pts)	AS Bakaridjan	2014–15 Malian Première Division fourth place
Nigeria (11th – 22 pts)	Nasarawa United	2015 Nigeria Professional Football League third place
Nigeria (11th – 22 pts)	Akwa United	2015 Nigerian FA Cup winner
(South Africa) South Africa (12th – 16 pts)	Bidvest Wits	2014–15 South African Premier Division third place
(South Africa) South Africa (12th – 16 pts)	Ajax Cape Town	2014–15 Nedbank Cup runner-up
Associations eligible to enter one team
Angola (13th – 11 pts)	Sagrada Esperança	2015 Taça de Angola runner-up
Libya (14th – 7 pts)	Al-Ittihad Tripoli	2013–14 Libyan Premier League runner-up (no league in 2015)
Ghana (T-15th – 6 pts)	**Medeama**	2015 Ghanaian FA Cup winner
Zambia (T-15th – 6 pts)	**Zanaco**	2015 Zambian Premier League runner-up
Ethiopia (17th – 4 pts)	Defence Force	2015 Ethiopian Cup winner
Niger (T-18th – 1 pt)	AS SONIDEP	2015 Niger Cup winner
Zimbabwe (T-18th – 1 pt)	Harare City	2015 Cup of Zimbabwe winner
Botswana	Gaborone United	2014–15 Mascom Top 8 Cup winner
(Burkina Faso) Burkina Faso	USFA	2015 Coupe du Faso winner
Burundi	Atlético Olympic	2015 Burundian Cup runner-up
Chad	Renaissance	2015 Chad Premier League third place
Comoros	Fomboni Club	2015 Comoros Cup winner
(Equatorial Guinea) Equatorial Guinea	Deportivo Mongomo	2015 Equatoguinean Cup winner
Gabon	**CF Mounana**	2015 Coupe du Gabon Interclubs winner
(The Gambia) Gambia	Wallidan	2015 Gambian Cup winner
Guinea	**AS Kaloum**	2015 Guinée Coupe Nationale winner
Kenya	Bandari	2015 FKF President's Cup winner
Liberia	**Barrack Young Controllers II**	2015 Liberian Cup winner
Madagascar	AS Adema	2015 Coupe de Madagascar runner-up
Mozambique	**Liga Desportiva de Maputo**	2015 Taça de Moçambique winner
Rwanda	Police	2015 Rwandan Cup winner
Senegal	Génération Foot	2015 Senegal FA Cup winner
Seychelles	Light Stars	2015 Seychelles FA Cup winner
(South Sudan) South Sudan	Atlabara	2015 South Sudan Football Championship champion
Tanzania	**Azam**	2014–15 Tanzanian Premier League runner-up
Uganda	SC Villa	2014–15 Ugandan Cup winner
Zanzibar	JKU	2014–15 Zanzibar Premier League runner-up

Teams entering the play-off round
Losers of the 2016 CAF Champions League second round
(South Africa) Mamelodi Sundowns	(Sudan) Al-Merrikh	(Democratic Republic of the Congo) TP Mazembe	(Tunisia) Étoile du Sahel
(Mali) Stade Malien	(Tanzania) Young Africans	(Libya) Al-Ahli Tripoli	(Algeria) MO Béjaïa

Associations which did not enter a team
- Benin
- (Cape Verde) Cape Verde
- (Central African Republic) Central African Republic
- Djibouti
- Eritrea
- Guinea-Bissau
- Lesotho
- Malawi
- Mauritania
- Mauritius
- Namibia
- Réunion
- (São Tomé and Príncipe) São Tomé and Príncipe
- (Sierra Leone) Sierra Leone
- Somalia
- (Eswatini) Swaziland
- Togo

Notably two team take part in the competition that do not currently play in their national top-division. They are Barrack Young Controllers II (2nd tier) and Génération Foot (2nd).

== Schedule ==
The schedule of the competition was as follows. For the first time, some rounds of matches were officially scheduled in midweek (in italics) instead of on weekends.

Phase	Round	Draw date	First leg	Second leg
Qualifying	Preliminary round	11 December 2015 (Dakar, Senegal)	12–14 February 2016	26–28 February 2016
Qualifying	First round	11 December 2015 (Dakar, Senegal)	11–13 March 2016	18–20 March 2016
Qualifying	Second round	11 December 2015 (Dakar, Senegal)	8–10 April 2016	19–20 April 2016
Qualifying	Play-off round	21 April 2016 (Cairo, Egypt)	6–8 May 2016	17–18 May 2016
Group stage	Matchday 1	24 May 2016 (Cairo, Egypt)	17–19 June 2016	
Group stage	Matchday 2	24 May 2016 (Cairo, Egypt)	28–29 June 2016	
Group stage	Matchday 3	24 May 2016 (Cairo, Egypt)	15–17 July 2016	
Group stage	Matchday 4	24 May 2016 (Cairo, Egypt)	26–27 July 2016	
Group stage	Matchday 5	24 May 2016 (Cairo, Egypt)	12–14 August 2016	
Group stage	Matchday 6	24 May 2016 (Cairo, Egypt)	23–24 August 2016	
Knockout stage	Semi-finals	24 May 2016 (Cairo, Egypt)	16–18 September 2016	23–25 September 2016
Knockout stage	Final	24 May 2016 (Cairo, Egypt)	28–30 October 2016	4–6 November 2016

== Qualifying rounds ==
The draw for the preliminary, first and second rounds was held on 11 December 2015 in Dakar, Senegal. In the qualifying rounds, each tie was played on a home-and-away two-legged basis. If the aggregate score was tied after the second leg, the away goals rule would be applied, and if still tied, extra time would not be played, and the penalty shoot-out would be used to determine the winner (Regulations III. 13 & 14).

=== Preliminary round ===
Team 1	Agg.	Team 2	1st leg	2nd leg
Vita Club Mokanda (Republic of the Congo)	1–1 (6–5 p)	(Nigeria) Akwa United	0–1	1–0
Police (Rwanda)	4–3	(South Sudan) Atlabara	3–1	1–2
Sagrada Esperança (Angola)	3–2	(South Africa) Ajax Cape Town	1–2	2–0
Wallidan (The Gambia)	w/o	(Algeria) MC Oran	—	—
SC Gagnoa (Ivory Coast)	2–0	(Mali) USFAS Bamako	2–0	0–0
Kawkab Marrakech (Morocco)	3–3 (5–4 p)	(Burkina Faso) USFA	3–0	0–3
Light Stars (Seychelles)	0–9	(South Africa) Bidvest Wits	0–3	0–6
Renaissance (Chad)	3–2	(Cameroon) New Star de Douala	1–0	2–2
Harare City (Zimbabwe)	6–3	(Madagascar) AS Adema	3–2	3–1
AS Bakaridjan (Mali)	2–2 (3–4 p)	(Tunisia) Stade Gabèsien	1–1	1–1
Nasarawa United (Nigeria)	2–1	(Senegal) Génération Foot	2–1	0–0
Defence Force (Ethiopia)	1–6	(Egypt) Misr Lel Makkasa	1–3	0–3
FC Saint-Éloi Lupopo (Democratic Republic of the Congo)	3–1	(Kenya) Bandari	2–0	1–1
Al-Ittihad Tripoli (Libya)	5–4	(Niger) AS SONIDEP	4–1	1–3
UMS de Loum (Cameroon)	0–0 (2–4 p) w/o; d/q	(Equatorial Guinea) Deportivo Mongomo	0–0	0–0
Khartoum (Sudan)	0–2	(Uganda) SC Villa	0–1	0–1
JKU (Zanzibar)	w/o	(Botswana) Gaborone United	—	—
Fomboni Club (Comoros)	1–2	(Burundi) Atlético Olympic	1–0	0–2
Diables Noirs (Republic of the Congo)	2–4	(Ivory Coast) Africa Sports	1–2	1–2

Notes

1. MC Oran won on walkover after Wallidan withdrew.
2. The CAF announced on 2 March 2016 that UMS de Loum won on walkover after Deportivo Mongomo were disqualified for fielding an ineligible player.
3. JKU won on walkover after Gaborone United withdrew.

=== First round ===
Team 1	Agg.	Team 2	1st leg	2nd leg
Vita Club Mokanda (Republic of the Congo)	1–0	(Rwanda) Police	0–0	1–0
Sagrada Esperança (Angola)	2–1	(Mozambique) Liga Desportiva de Maputo	1–0	1–1
MC Oran (Algeria)	4–2	(Ivory Coast) SC Gagnoa	2–0	2–2
Kawkab Marrakech (Morocco)	3–2	(Liberia) Barrack Young Controllers II	3–0	0–2
Bidvest Wits (South Africa)	3–7	(Tanzania) Azam	0–3	3–4
Renaissance (Chad)	0–7	(Tunisia) Espérance de Tunis	0–2	0–5
Harare City (Zimbabwe)	2–5	(Zambia) Zanaco	1–2	1–3
Stade Gabèsien (Tunisia)	2–1	(Guinea) AS Kaloum	2–1	0–0
Nasarawa United (Nigeria)	2–4	(Algeria) CS Constantine	1–0	1–4
Misr Lel Makkasa (Egypt)	3–2	(Democratic Republic of the Congo) CS Don Bosco	3–1	0–1
FC Saint-Éloi Lupopo (Democratic Republic of the Congo)	2–2 (a)	(Sudan) Al-Ahly Shendi	2–1	0–1
Al-Ittihad Tripoli (Libya)	1–2	(Ghana) Medeama	1–0	0–2
UMS de Loum (Cameroon)	2–3	(Morocco) FUS Rabat	1–1	1–2
SC Villa (Uganda)	5–0	(Zanzibar) JKU	4–0	1–0
Atlético Olympic (Burundi)	0–5	(Gabon) CF Mounana	0–2	0–3
Africa Sports (Ivory Coast)	1–6	(Egypt) ENPPI	0–2	1–4

=== Second round ===
Team 1	Agg.	Team 2	1st leg	2nd leg
Vita Club Mokanda (Republic of the Congo)	1–4	(Angola) Sagrada Esperança	1–2	0–2
MC Oran (Algeria)	0–1	(Morocco) Kawkab Marrakech	0–0	0–1
Azam (Tanzania)	2–4	(Tunisia) Espérance de Tunis	2–1	0–3
Zanaco (Zambia)	1–4	(Tunisia) Stade Gabèsien	1–1	0–3
CS Constantine (Algeria)	2–3	(Egypt) Misr Lel Makkasa	1–0	1–3
Al-Ahly Shendi (Sudan)	0–2	(Ghana) Medeama	0–0	0–2
FUS Rabat (Morocco)	7–1	(Uganda) SC Villa	7–0	0–1
CF Mounana (Gabon)	2–2 (5–4 p)	(Egypt) ENPPI	2–0	0–2

The eight winners of the second round advanced to the play-off round, where they were joined by the eight losers of the Champions League second round.

=== Play-off round ===
The draw for the play-off round was held on 21 April 2016, 14:00 EET (UTC+2), at the CAF Headquarters in Cairo, Egypt. The winners of the Confederation Cup second round were drawn against the losers of the Champions League second round, with the former hosting the second leg. The eight winners of the play-off round advanced to the group stage.

Team 1	Agg.	Team 2	1st leg	2nd leg
MO Béjaïa (Algeria)	1–1 (a)	(Tunisia) Espérance de Tunis	0–0	1–1
Stade Malien (Mali)	0–4	(Morocco) FUS Rabat	0–0	0–4
Étoile du Sahel (Tunisia)	2–1	(Gabon) CF Mounana	2–0	0–1
TP Mazembe (Democratic Republic of the Congo)	2–2 (a)	(Tunisia) Stade Gabèsien	1–0	1–2
Al-Ahli Tripoli (Libya)	1–1 (a)	(Egypt) Misr Lel Makkasa	0–0	1–1
Al-Merrikh (Sudan)	1–2	(Morocco) Kawkab Marrakech	1–0	0–2
Young Africans (Tanzania)	2–1	(Angola) Sagrada Esperança	2–0	0–1
Mamelodi Sundowns (South Africa)	3–3 (a)	(Ghana) Medeama	3–1	0–2

Notes

4. The CAF announced on 24 May 2016 that Mamelodi Sundowns won their Champions League second round tie on walkover after AS Vita Club were disqualified for fielding an ineligible player in their preliminary round tie against Mafunzo. Mamelodi Sundowns played in the Confederation Cup play-off round before they were reinstated to the Champions League.

== Group stage ==
Location of teams of the 2016 CAF Confederation Cup group stage.
Group A.
Group B.

The draw for the group stage was held on 24 May 2016, 14:30 EET (UTC+2), at the CAF headquarters in Cairo, Egypt. The eight teams were drawn into two groups of four. In the group stage, each group was played on a home-and-away round-robin basis. The winners and runners-up of each group advanced to the semi-finals.

Tiebreakers

The teams were ranked according to points (3 points for a win, 1 point for a draw, 0 points for a loss). If tied on points, tiebreakers would be applied in the following order (Regulations III. 20 & 21):

1. Number of points obtained in games between the teams concerned;
2. Goal difference in games between the teams concerned;
3. Goals scored in games between the teams concerned;
4. Away goals scored in games between the teams concerned;
5. If, after applying criteria 1 to 4 to several teams, two teams still have an equal ranking, criteria 1 to 4 are reapplied exclusively to the matches between the two teams in question to determine their final rankings. If this procedure does not lead to a decision, criteria 6 to 9 apply;
6. Goal difference in all games;
7. Goals scored in all games;
8. Away goals scored in all games;
9. Drawing of lots.

=== Group A ===
Pos	Team	Pld	W	D	L	GF	GA	GD	Pts	Qualification	TPM	MOB	MED	YAN
1	(Democratic Republic of the Congo) TP Mazembe	6	4	1	1	10	5	+5	13	Knockout stage	—	1–0	3–1	3–1
2	(Algeria) MO Béjaïa	6	2	2	2	2	2	0	8	Knockout stage	0–0	—	1–0	1–0
3	(Ghana) Medeama	6	2	2	2	8	8	0	8		3–2	0–0	—	3–1
4	(Tanzania) Young Africans	6	1	1	4	4	9	−5	4		0–1	1–0	1–1	—

Source: CAF

=== Group B ===
Pos	Team	Pld	W	D	L	GF	GA	GD	Pts	Qualification	FUS	ESS	KAC	AHL
1	(Morocco) FUS Rabat	6	3	3	0	9	4	+5	12	Knockout stage	—	0–0	3–1	1–0
2	(Tunisia) Étoile du Sahel	6	3	2	1	9	4	+5	11	Knockout stage	1–1	—	3–1	3–0
3	(Morocco) Kawkab Marrakech	6	2	1	3	9	13	−4	7		1–3	2–1	—	2–2
4	(Libya) Al-Ahli Tripoli	6	0	2	4	4	10	−6	2		1–1	0–1	1–2	—

Source: CAF

== Knockout stage ==
In the knockout stage, the four teams played a single-elimination tournament. Each tie was played on a home-and-away two-legged basis. If the aggregate score was tied after the second leg, the away goals rule would be applied, and if still tied, extra time would not be played, and the penalty shoot-out would be used to determine the winner (Regulations III. 26 & 27).

=== Bracket ===
Semi-finals
1	(Algeria) MO Béjaïa (a)	0	1	1
4	(Morocco) FUS Rabat	0	1	1
3	(Tunisia) Étoile du Sahel	1	0	1
2	(Democratic Republic of the Congo) TP Mazembe (a)	1	0	1

Final
(Algeria) MO Béjaïa	1	1	2
(Democratic Republic of the Congo) TP Mazembe	1	4	5

=== Semi-finals ===
In the semi-finals, the group A winners played the group B runners-up, and the group B winners played the group A runners-up, with the group winners hosting the second leg.

Team 1	Agg.	Team 2	1st leg	2nd leg
Étoile du Sahel (Tunisia)	1–1 (a)	(Democratic Republic of the Congo) TP Mazembe	1–1	0–0
MO Béjaïa (Algeria)	1–1 (a)	(Morocco) FUS Rabat	0–0	1–1

=== Final ===
In the final, the two semi-final winners played each other, with the order of legs decided by an additional draw held after the group stage draw.

29 October 2016
20:30 UTC+1

MO Béjaïa (Algeria)	1–1	(Democratic Republic of the Congo) TP Mazembe
Yaya 66'	Report	Bolingi 43' (pen.)

Stade Mustapha Tchaker, Blida
Attendance: 30,000
Referee: Bernard Camille (Seychelles)
6 November 2016
15:30 UTC+2

TP Mazembe (Democratic Republic of the Congo)	4–1	(Algeria) MO Béjaïa
Bokadi 7'; Kalaba 44', 62'; Bolingi 77'	Report	Khadir 75'

Stade TP Mazembe, Lubumbashi
Attendance: 18,000
Referee: Malang Diedhiou (Senegal)

TP Mazembe won 5–2 on aggregate.

== Top goalscorers ==
Rank	Player	Team	Goals
1	(Zambia) Rainford Kalaba	(Democratic Republic of the Congo) TP Mazembe	7
2	(Democratic Republic of the Congo) Jonathan Bolingi	(Democratic Republic of the Congo) TP Mazembe	6
2	(Angola) Love	(Angola) Sagrada Esperança	6
4	(Morocco) Mohammad El Fakih	(Morocco) Kawkab Marrakech	5
4	(Ghana) Abass Mohammed	(Ghana) Medeama	5
4	(Morocco) Mohammed Nahiri	(Morocco) FUS Rabat	5
7	(Morocco) Abdelilah Amimi	(Morocco) Kawkab Marrakech	4
7	(Morocco) Abdessalam Benjelloun	(Morocco) FUS Rabat	4
7	(Tunisia) Ahmed Hosni	(Tunisia) Stade Gabèsien	4
10	(Tunisia) Ahmed Akaïchi	(Tunisia) Étoile du Sahel	3
10	(Egypt) Amr Barakat	(Egypt) Misr Lel Makkasa	3
10	(Morocco) Mourad Batna	(Morocco) FUS Rabat	3
10	(Tunisia) Hichem Essifi	(Tunisia) Stade Gabèsien	3
10	(Tunisia) Haythem Jouini	(Tunisia) Espérance de Tunis	3
10	(Ivory Coast) Tchétché Kipré	(Tanzania) Azam	3
10	(Tunisia) Hamza Lahmar	(Tunisia) Étoile du Sahel	3
10	(Zimbabwe) Raphael Manuvire	(Zimbabwe) Harare City	3
10	(Tunisia) Iheb Msakni	(Tunisia) Étoile du Sahel	3
10	(Ghana) Nana Poku	(Egypt) Misr Lel Makkasa	3

== See also ==
- 2016 CAF Champions League
- 2017 CAF Super Cup
