= Ibrahim Yehia =

Egyptian footballer (born 1987)

Personal information
- Date of birth: October 17, 1987 (age 39)
- Position: Center-back

Team information
- Current team: ZED FC

Youth career
- Ismaily

Senior career*
Years	Team	Apps	(Gls)
2005–2012	Ismaily	88	(1)
2012–	Enppi	89	(1)
- * Club domestic league appearances and goals as of 13 July 2017

Ibrahim Yehia (Arabic: إبراهيم يحيى; born October 17, 1987) is an Egyptian professional footballer who plays as a center-back for the Egyptian club ZED FC. He previously played for Ismaily SC before signing a 3-year contract for Enppi for 750,000 Egyptian pound per season.
