= Florent Rajaoniasy =

Malagasy footballer

Personal information
- Full name: Nomenjanahary Florent Rajaoniasy
- Date of birth: November 12, 1992 (age 33)
- Place of birth: Antananarivo, Madagascar
- Height: 1.74 m (5 ft 9 in)
- Position: Midfielder

Senior career*
Years	Team	Apps	(Gls)
2011	Academie Ny Antsika		
2012–2016	AS Adema		
2016–2017	La Passe FC		

International career
2015–2016	Madagascar	8	(0)
- * Club domestic league appearances and goals

Florent Rajaoniasy (born 12 November 1992) is a Malagasy football midfielder.
