= Wael Farrag =

Egyptian football player (born 1987)

Personal information
- Full name: Wael Farrag
- Date of birth: June 1, 1987 (age 39)
- Place of birth: Egypt
- Height: 1.84 m (6 ft 0 in)
- Position: Striker

Team information
- Current team: Raja

Senior career*
Years	Team	Apps	(Gls)
2009–2011	Petrol Asyout	22	(4)
2011–2013	Petrojet	30	(4)
2013–2014	Telephonat Beni Suef	20	(7)
2014–2015	Al-Makasa	27	(13)
2015–2016	ENPPI	22	(3)
2016–2017	Petrojet	20	(2)
2017–2018	Tala'ea El Gaish	12	(1)
2018	Tersana		
2018	Al-Sharq		
2019–	Raja		
- * Club domestic league appearances and goals ‡ National team caps and goals as of 23:39, 13 May 2019 (UTC)

Wael Farrag (Arabic: وائل فراج, born June 1, 1987) is an Egyptian football player playing for El Raja SC.
