= Youcef Touati =

French footballer (1989-2017)

Personal information
- Full name: Youcef Touati
- Date of birth: 29 March 1989
- Place of birth: Saint-Denis, France
- Date of death: 16 March 2017 (aged 27)
- Height: 1.67 m (5 ft 6 in)
- Position: Attacking midfielder

Youth career
- 2005–2007: Amiens
- 2008: AC Amiens

Senior career*
Years	Team	Apps	(Gls)
2008–2009	Pacy	18	(1)
2009–2011	Dijon	11	(1)
2010–2011	→ Cannes (loan)	14	(1)
2011–2012	Red Star	25	(2)
2012–2013	Istres	8	(0)
2013–2014	Tours	4	(0)
2014–2015	Épinal	16	(1)
2015–2016	Chambly	18	(2)
2016–2017	MO Béjaïa	6	(0)
Total		120	(8)

International career
2009	Algeria U23	1	(0)
- * Club domestic league appearances and goals

Youcef Touati (29 March 1989 – 16 March 2017) was an Algerian professional footballer who played as an attacking midfielder.

== Club career ==
=== Youth career ===
Born in Saint-Denis, Touati began his career bouncing around the junior ranks of several different clubs: ES Paris, Red Star 93, CS Sedan and Paris FC. In 2005, at age 16, he joined the Amiens SC academy where he stayed for two years. In 2007, the club offered Touati a professional trainee contract but, on the advice of his agent, he declined it to go join Spanish side Villarreal CF. However, he was unable to sign with Villarreal since the club was not willing to pay Amiens for the transfer. Touati finally returned to Amiens four months later, this time to sign with the city's other team, AC Amiens.

=== Pacy VEF ===
At the beginning of the 2008 season, Touati signed a contract with Championnat National side Pacy Vallée-d'Eure. However, AC Amiens claimed that the player was still under contract with the club, forcing him to sit out the first four months of the season. The clubs finally reached an agreement in December 2008 allowing Touati to feature for Pacy. He made 18 appearances for the club in the 2008–09 season, scoring one goal.

=== Dijon ===
On 6 July 2009, Touati signed a three-year contract with Ligue 2 side Dijon FCO. On 7 August 2009, he made his debut for the club starting in a league match against Angers SCO.

=== Cannes ===
On 9 September 2010, Touati was loaned out to Championnat National side AS Cannes until the end of the season.

== International career ==
On 14 September 2009, Touati received his first call up to the Algerian Under-23 National Team for a 10-day training camp in Marseille. On 9 February 2011, he played his first match for the team, a 3–2 win over Senegal in a friendly in Sidi Moussa. However, after the game, head coach Azzedine Aït Djoudi said that Touati would be dropped from the team after showing a lack of motivation.

== Death ==
After a traffic accident at the A1 autoroute on 6 March 2017, Touati's death was announced by various sources, including one of his previous clubs. However, it was announced by his family on 9 March 2017 that he survived the accident, being instead in a deep coma according to an official statement released by his family. Touati eventually died on 16 March. He was 27.

== Career statistics ==
As of 30 October 2015.

Appearances and goals by club, season and competition
Club	Season	League			Cup		League Cup		Total	
Club	Season	Division	Apps	Goals	Apps	Goals	Apps	Goals	Apps	Goals
Pacy-sur-Eure	2008–09	National	18	1	0	0	0	0	18	1
Dijon	2009–10	Ligue 2	9	1	1	0	2	0	12	1
Dijon	2010–11	Ligue 2	2	0	0	0	1	0	3	0
Cannes (loan)	2010–11	National	14	1	1	0	0	0	15	1
Red Star Saint-Ouen	2011–12	National	25	2	2	0	0	0	27	2
Istres	2012–13	Ligue 2	8	0	2	0	1	0	11	0
Tours	2013–14	Ligue 2	4	0	0	0	1	0	5	0
Épinal	2014–15	National	16	1	5	1	0	0	21	2
Chambly	2015–16	National	10	1	0	0	0	0	10	1
Career total			106	7	11	1	5	0	122	8
