= Ange Pacôme Gnagbo =

Ivorian footballer

Personal information
- Full name: Ange Pacôme Gnagbo Dogba
- Date of birth: February 4, 1991 (age 35)
- Place of birth: Lakota, Ivory Coast
- Height: 1.71 m (5 ft 7 in)
- Position: Midfielder

Senior career*
Years	Team	Apps	(Gls)
2008	Africa Sports		
2009	Séwé Sport		
2010–2012	ASEC Mimosas		
2012–2013	Africa Sports		
2013–2014	AS Tanda		
2014–2016	Africa Sports		
2016–2019	FC San-Pédro		
2019	AS Tanda		

International career
2016	Ivory Coast	1	(0)
- * Club domestic league appearances and goals

Ange Pacôme Gnagbo (born 4 February 1991) is an Ivorian football midfielder.
