= Ahmed Messadia =

Algerian footballer (born 1986)

Personal information
- Date of birth: June 15, 1986 (age 40)
- Place of birth: Batna, Algeria
- Height: 1.89 m (6 ft 2 in)
- Position: Striker

Team information
- Current team: CA Batna
- Number: 13

Youth career
- CA Batna

Senior career*
Years	Team	Apps	(Gls)
2008–2012	CA Batna	56	(30)
2012–2014	JS Kabylie	49	(9)
2014–2016	CS Constantine	40	(2)
2016–2017	MO Béjaïa	20	(9)
2017	Olympique de Médéa	7	(0)
2018	CA Bordj Bou Arreridj	?	(?)
2018–2020	US Biskra	?	(?)
2020	WA Tlemcen	?	(?)
2020–	CA Batna	0	(0)
- * Club domestic league appearances and goals as of 2020

Ahmed Messadia is an Algerian professional football player. He plays for CA Batna in the Algerian Ligue 2.
