= Mohammed El Fakih =

Moroccan footballer

Mohammed el Fakih
Personal information
- Date of birth: 7 February 1990 (age 36)
- Place of birth: Casablanca, Morocco
- Position: Attacking midfielder

Team information
- Current team: MA Tétouan

Youth career
- Raja Casablanca

Senior career*
Years	Team	Apps	(Gls)
- TAS de Casablanca
2013–2015	JS Massira		
2015–2017	Kawkab Marrakech	65	(25)
2017–2019	FAR Rabat	26	(4)
2019	→ Youssoufia Berrechid (loan)	15	(7)
2020–2021	Olympique Khouribga	18	(2)
2021–2022	Maghreb de Fès	44	(11)
2022–2023	Al Ahli SC (Tripoli)		
2023	Al-Arabi	`	
2024-	MA Tétouan		
- * Club domestic league appearances and goals

Mohammed el Fakih (born 7 February 1990) is a Moroccan footballer who plays as an attacking midfielder.

== Career ==
He started his youth career with Raja Casablanca, but did not get his full chance with his childhood team, so he left for JS Massira to seek more games. A year later he proved himself in the Second Division with Chabab El Masira so he got signed by Kawkab Marrakech for the 2015 season.

Kawkab Marrakech had a chance to participate in the 2016 CAF Confederation Cup, and he was one of the best players of the tournament scoring 6 goals and taking his team to the group stage with strong teams such as Etoile Sahel.

2016 has been a good year for Mohammed el Fakih. Therefore, Raja Casablanca has offered him a contract but he signed a 2 years extension that will make him stay until 2018.

In January 2019, El Fakih was loaned out to Youssoufia Berrechid from FAR Rabat.

On 25 December 2022, El Fakih joined Saudi Arabian club Al-Arabi.
