= Raphael Manuvire =

Zimbabwean footballer (born 1988)

Personal information
- Full name: Raphael Manuvire
- Date of birth: 21 September 1988 (age 38)
- Place of birth: Chegutu, Zimbabwe
- Height: 1.79 m (5 ft 10 in)
- Position: Midfielder

Senior career*
Years	Team	Apps	(Gls)
2012–2013	Harare City		
2014–2015	ZPC Kariba		
2016	Harare City		
2017	ZPC Kariba		
2018	Dynamos		
2018	Chapungu United		

International career^{‡}
2015–2018	Zimbabwe	14	(1)
- * Club domestic league appearances and goals as of 14 November 2020 ‡ National team caps and goals as of 14 November 2020

Raphael Manuvire (born 21 September 1988) is a Zimbabwean footballer who last played as a midfielder for Chapungu United and the Zimbabwe national team.

== Career ==
=== Club ===
Manuvire began his career in 2012 with Harare City in the Zimbabwe Premier Soccer League, he remained with Harare for two years before making the move to newly promoted PSL side ZPC Kariba. Another two years passed before Manuvire was on the move again as he rejoined Harare City in 2016 on a one-year contract. On 13 February 2017, Manuvire joined ZPC Kariba for a second spell. Almost a year later, Manuvire signed for Dynamos. He terminated his Dynamos contract in July 2018, subsequently joining Chapungu United.

=== International ===
Manuvire has won six caps for the Zimbabwe national team. He scored his first international goal for Zimbabwe in a 4–1 defeat in a 2015 COSAFA Cup group stage match versus Namibia.

== Career statistics ==
=== International ===
As of 8 March 2018.

National team	Year	Apps	Goals
Zimbabwe	2015	3	1
Zimbabwe	2016	3	0
Total		6	1

=== International goals ===
As of 8 March 2018. Scores and results list Zimbabwe's goal tally first.

Goal	Date	Venue	Opponent	Score	Result	Competition
1	21 May 2015	Moruleng Stadium, Rustenburg, South Africa	Namibia	1–3	1–4	2015 COSAFA Cup
