= Morgan Betorangal =

Chadian footballer (born 1988)

Personal information
- Full name: Morgan Betorangal
- Date of birth: 25 August 1988 (age 38)
- Place of birth: Nanterre, France
- Height: 1.75 m (5 ft 9 in)
- Positions: Left-back; midfielder

Youth career
- Nantes

Senior career*
Years	Team	Apps	(Gls)
2008–2009	Nantes B		
2009–2010	UN Käerjéng 97	1	(0)
2010–2012	Union 05 Kayl-Tétange	25	(2)
2012–2014	F91 Dudelange	21	(2)
2015	RC Arbaâ	5	(0)
2015–2017	MO Béjaïa	16	(2)
2017–2018	CR Al Hoceima	26	(1)
2019	Racing France		
2020	UNA Strassen	3	(0)
2020	CR Al Hoceima		

International career
2012–2020	Chad	11	(0)
- * Club domestic league appearances and goals

Morgan Betorangal (born 25 August 1988) is a Chadian footballer who currently plays as left-back.

In December 2015, Betorangal signed an 18-month contract with MO Béjaïa.

== See also ==
- List of Chad international footballers
