= FUS Stadium =

Sports venue in Rabat, Morocco

- Stade Belvédère
- Interactive map of FUS Stadium
- Full name: FUS Rabat Stadium
- Location: Rabat, Morocco
- Coordinates: 34°00′36″N 6°50′25″W
- Capacity: 15,000

Tenant
- FUS de Rabat

FUS Stadium is a multi-use stadium in Rabat, Morocco. It is used mostly for football matches and hosts the home games of FUS Rabat of the Botola. The stadium holds 15,000 spectators.
