= Jonathan Bolingi =

Congolese footballer (born 1994)

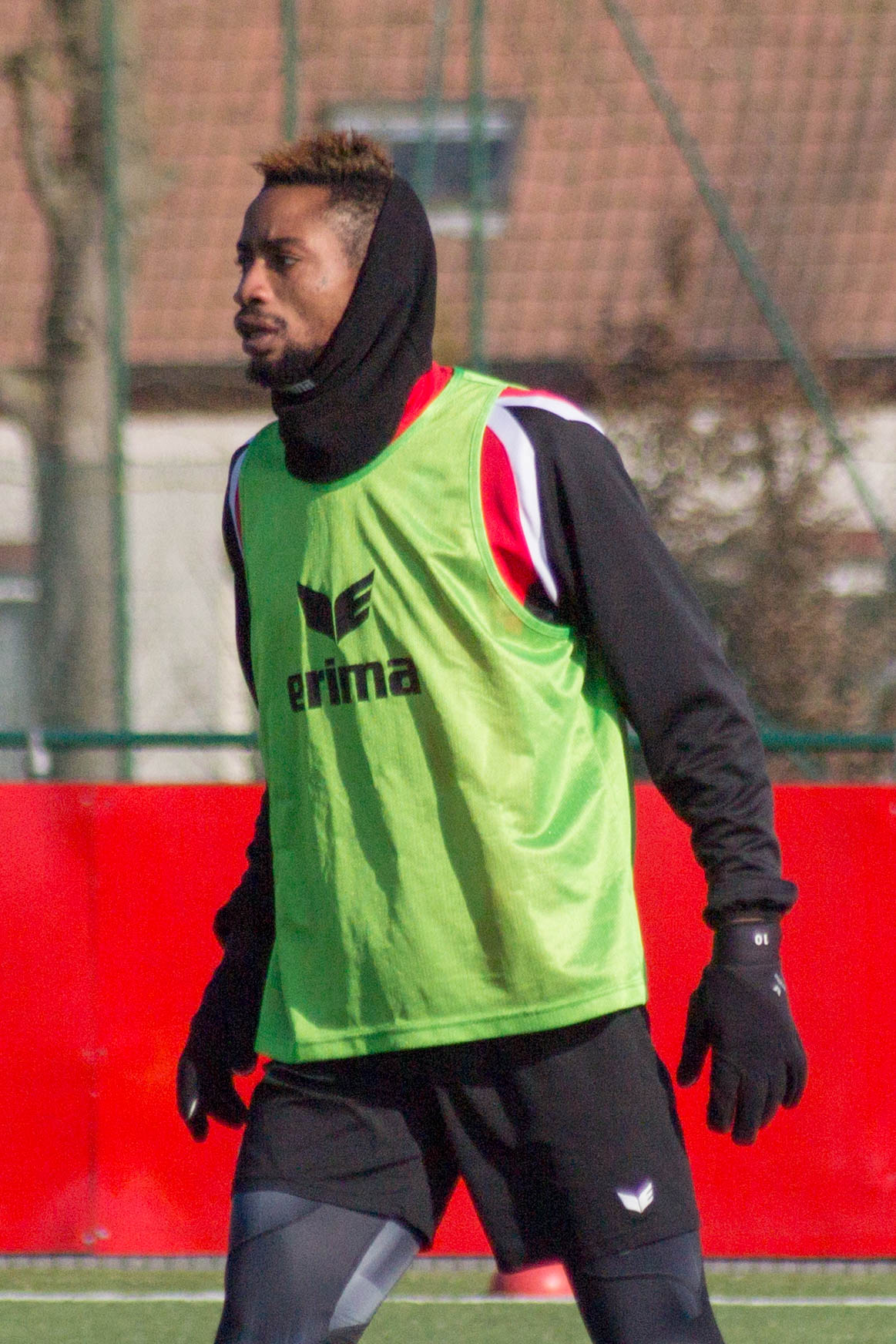
- Bolingi training with Mouscron in 2018

Personal information
- Full name: Jonathan Bolingi Mpangi Merikani
- Date of birth: 30 June 1994 (age 32)
- Place of birth: Kinshasa, Zaire
- Height: 1.90 m (6 ft 3 in)
- Positions: Forward; left winger

Team information
- Current team: Jwaya

Senior career*
Years	Team	Apps	(Gls)
2013–2014	Jomo Cosmos	23	(9)
2014–2017	Mazembe	52	(20)
2017–2018	Standard Liège	6	(0)
2017–2018	→ Mouscron (loan)	26	(7)
2018–2021	Antwerp	40	(2)
2019–2020	→ Eupen (loan)	18	(4)
2020–2021	→ Ankaragücü (loan)	14	(1)
2021	→ Lausanne-Sport (loan)	16	(5)
2022–2023	Buriram United	35	(11)
2023–2025	Vojvodina	11	(2)
2025–2026	Chonburi	27	(6)
2026–	Jwaya	2	(2)

International career^{‡}
2014–	DR Congo	34	(9)
- * Club domestic league appearances and goals as of 05:30, 30 April 2026 (UTC) ‡ National team caps and goals as of 8 June 2022

Jonathan Bolingi Mpangi Merikani (born 30 June 1994) is a Congolese professional footballer who plays as a forward for Jwaya.

== Club career ==
On 3 September 2019, Bolingi joined Eupen on a season-long loan. On 5 February 2021, Bolingi joined Swiss Super League side Lausanne-Sport on loan for the rest of the season with an option to make the deal permanent.

On 2 December 2021, Bolingi signed with Buriram United in Thailand.

On 29 July 2023, he signed a two-year deal with Vojvodina.

== Personal life ==
Bolingi is the son of former professional footballer, Mpangi Merikani.

== Career statistics ==
Scores and results list DR Congo's goal tally first.

No.	Date	Venue	Opponent	Score	Result	Competition
1.	21 January 2016	Stade Huye, Butare, Rwanda	Angola	3–0	4–2	2016 African Nations Championship
2.	3 February 2016	Amahoro Stadium, Kigali, Rwanda	Guinea	1–0	1–1 (5–4 p)	2016 African Nations Championship
3.	7 February 2016	Amahoro Stadium, Kigali, Rwanda	Mali	3–0	3–0	2016 African Nations Championship
4.	29 March 2016	Estádio 11 de Novembro, Luanda, Angola	Angola	2–0	2–0	2017 Africa Cup of Nations qualification
5.	4 September 2016	Stade des Martyrs, Kinshasa, DR Congo	Central African Republic	3–1	4–1	2017 Africa Cup of Nations qualification
6.	8 October 2016	Stade des Martyrs, Kinshasa, DR Congo	Libya	2–0	4–0	2018 FIFA World Cup qualification
7.	11 November 2017	Stade des Martyrs, Kinshasa, DR Congo	Guinea	2–1	3–1	2018 FIFA World Cup qualification
8.	30 June 2019	30 June Stadium, Cairo, Egypt	Zimbabwe	1–0	4–0	2019 Africa Cup of Nations
9.	8 June 2022	Al-Hilal Stadium, Omdurman, Sudan	Sudan	1–2	1–2	2023 Africa Cup of Nations qualification

== Honours ==
TP Mazembe

- Linafoot: 2013–14, 2015–16; runner-up 2014–15
- CAF Champions League: 2015
- CAF Super Cup: 2016
- CAF Confederation Cup: 2016

Buriram United

- Thai League 1: 2021–22, 2022–23
- Thai FA Cup: 2021–22, 2022–23
- Thai League Cup: 2021–22, 2022–23

DR Congo

- African Nations Championship: 2016
