= Bernard Camille =

Seychellois association football referee

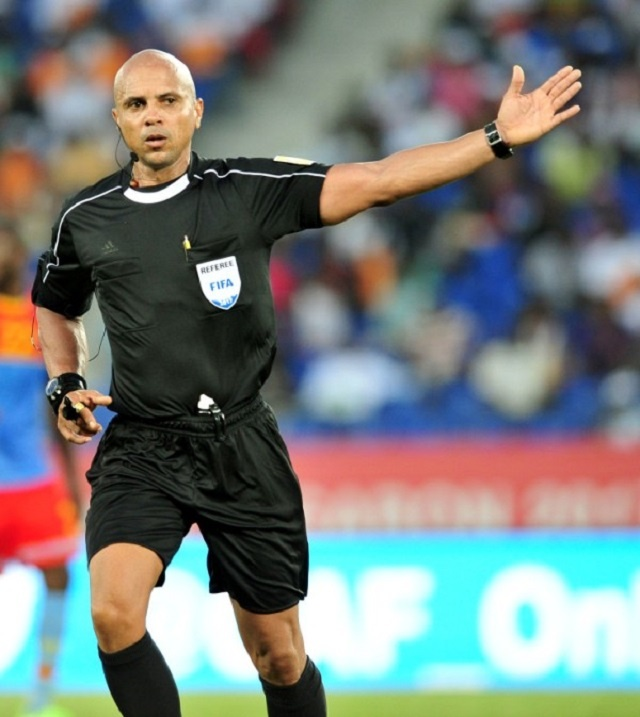
- Full name: Bernard Camille
- Born: 6 October 1975 (age 51); Seychelles

International
Years	League	Role
2011–	FIFA	Referee

Bernard Camille (born 6 October 1975) is a Seychellois association football referee who is a listed international referee for FIFA since 2011.

He was one of the referees for the 2015 Africa Cup of Nations.
