= Malang Diedhiou =

Senegalese football referee

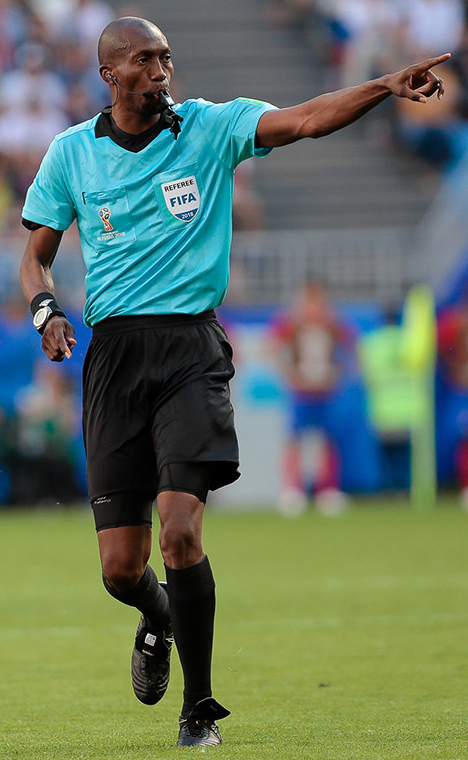
- Diedhiou officiating a match at Samara in 2018
- Full name: Malang Diedhiou
- Born: 30 April 1973 (age 53); Badiana, Ziguinchor, Senegal
- Other occupation: Customs officer

International
Years	League	Role
2008–2018	FIFA listed	Referee

Malang Diedhiou (born 30 April 1973) is a retired international football referee from Senegal. He has refereed matches in the 2015 Africa Cup of Nations, the 2016 Summer Olympics and the 2017 Africa Cup of Nations. He was also a video assistant referee during the 2017 FIFA Confederations Cup. Diedhiou was also a referee in the 2017 FIFA Club World Cup and the 2018 FIFA World Cup in Russia.

== FIFA World Cup ==
2018 FIFA World Cup – Russia
Date	Match	Venue	Round
17 June 2018	Costa Rica – Serbia	Samara	Group stage
25 June 2018	Uruguay – Russia	Samara	Group stage
2 July 2018	Belgium – Japan	Rostov-on-Don	Round of 16
