= 2016 CAF Champions League qualifying rounds =

- Dates: 12 February – 20 April 2016

The 2016 CAF Champions League qualifying rounds were played from 12 February to 20 April 2016. A total of 55 teams competed in the qualifying rounds to decide the eight places in the group stage of the 2016 CAF Champions League.

== Draw ==
The draw for the preliminary, first and second rounds was held on 11 December 2015 in Dakar, Senegal.

The entry round of the 55 teams entered into the draw was determined by their performances in the CAF competitions for the previous five seasons (CAF 5-year ranking points shown in parentheses).

| Entry round | First round | Preliminary round |
|---|---|---|
| Teams | (Egypt) Al-Ahly (53 pts); (Democratic Republic of the Congo) TP Mazembe (52 pts); (Algeria) ES Sétif (33 pts); (Sudan) Al-Hilal (30 pts); (Tunisia) Étoile du Sahel (27 pts); (Republic of the Congo) AC Léopards (24 pts); (Egypt) Zamalek (22 pts); (Sudan) Al-Merrikh (19 pts); (Cameroon) Coton Sport (19 pts) | (Democratic Republic of the Congo) AS Vita Club (16 pts); (Mali) Stade Malien (13 pts); (Morocco) Wydad AC (6 pts); (Ivory Coast) ASEC Mimosas (5 pts); (Tunisia) Club Africain (3 pts); (Nigeria) Enyimba (3 pts); (Angola) Recreativo do Libolo (3 pts); (Ethiopia) Saint George (3 pts); (Algeria) MO Béjaïa; (Ivory Coast) AS Tanda; (Morocco) Olympique Khouribga; (Cameroon) Union Douala; (Republic of the Congo) Étoile du Congo; (Mali) Onze Créateurs; (Nigeria) Warri Wolves; (South Africa) Kaizer Chiefs; (South Africa) Mamelodi Sundowns; (Libya) Al-Ahli Tripoli; (Ghana) Ashanti Gold; (Zambia) ZESCO United; (Niger) AS Douanes Niamey; (Zimbabwe) Chicken Inn; (Botswana) Centre Chiefs; (Burkina Faso) RC Bobo Dioulasso; (Burundi) Vital'O; (Chad) AS CotonTchad; (Comoros) Volcan Club; (Equatorial Guinea) Racing de Micomeseng; (Gabon) AS Mangasport; (The Gambia) Gamtel; (Guinea) Horoya; (Kenya) Gor Mahia; (Lesotho) Lioli; (Liberia) Nimba United; (Madagascar) CNaPS Sport; (Mauritius) Cercle de Joachim; (Mozambique) Ferroviário Maputo; (Rwanda) APR; (São Tomé and Príncipe) Sporting Praia Cruz; (Senegal) AS Douanes Dakar; (Seychelles) St Michel United; (South Sudan) Al-Ghazal; (Eswatini) Mbabane Swallows; (Tanzania) Young Africans; (Uganda) Vipers; (Zanzibar) Mafunzo |

== Format ==
In the qualifying rounds, each tie was played on a home-and-away two-legged basis. If the aggregate score was tied after the second leg, the away goals rule would be applied, and if still tied, extra time would not be played, and the penalty shoot-out would be used to determine the winner (Regulations III. 13 & 14).

== Schedule ==
The schedule of each round was as follows.

| Round | First leg | Second leg |
|---|---|---|
| Preliminary round | 12–14 February 2016 | 26–28 February 2016 |
| First round | 11–13 March 2016 | 18–20 March 2016 |
| Second round | 8–10 April 2016 | 19–20 April 2016 |

== Bracket ==
The eight winners of the second round advanced to the group stage, while the eight losers of the second round entered the Confederation Cup play-off round.

Preliminary round
(Zanzibar) Mafunzo | 0 | 0 | 0
(Democratic Republic of the Congo) AS Vita Club | 3 | 1 | 4
(Botswana) Centre Chiefs | — | — | —
(Mozambique) Ferroviário Maputo (w/o) | — | — | —
(Zimbabwe) Chicken Inn | 1 | 0 | 1
(South Africa) Mamelodi Sundowns | 0 | 2 | 2
(Republic of the Congo) AC Léopards | — | — | —
Bye | — | — | —

First round
(Democratic Republic of the Congo) AS Vita Club | 1 | 1 | 2
(Mozambique) Ferroviário Maputo | 0 | 1 | 1
(South Africa) Mamelodi Sundowns | 2 | 1 | 3
(Republic of the Congo) AC Léopards | 0 | 1 | 1

Second round
(Democratic Republic of the Congo) AS Vita Club (a) (d/q) | 1 | 1 | 2
(South Africa) Mamelodi Sundowns (w/o) | 0 | 2 | 2

Preliminary round
(Nigeria) Warri Wolves (w/o) | — | — | —
(São Tomé and Príncipe) Sporting Praia Cruz | — | — | —
(Sudan) Al-Merrikh | — | — | —
Bye | — | — | —
(Gabon) AS Mangasport | 0 | 0 | 0
(Republic of the Congo) Étoile du Congo | 0 | 3 | 3
(Algeria) ES Sétif | — | — | —
Bye | — | — | —

First round
(Nigeria) Warri Wolves | 0 | 0 | 0
(Sudan) Al-Merrikh | 1 | 1 | 2
(Republic of the Congo) Étoile du Congo | 1 | 2 | 3
(Algeria) ES Sétif | 1 | 4 | 5

Second round
(Sudan) Al-Merrikh | 2 | 0 | 2
(Algeria) ES Sétif (a) | 2 | 0 | 2

Preliminary round
(Morocco) Wydad AC | 2 | 1 | 3
(Niger) AS Douanes Niamey | 0 | 2 | 2
(Kenya) Gor Mahia | 1 | 0 | 1
(Madagascar) CNaPS Sport | 2 | 1 | 3
(Ethiopia) Saint George | 3 | 1 | 4
(Seychelles) St Michel United | 0 | 1 | 1
(Democratic Republic of the Congo) TP Mazembe | — | — | —
Bye | — | — | —

First round
(Morocco) Wydad AC | 5 | 1 | 6
(Madagascar) CNaPS Sport | 1 | 2 | 3
(Ethiopia) Saint George | 2 | 0 | 2
(Democratic Republic of the Congo) TP Mazembe | 2 | 1 | 3

Second round
(Morocco) Wydad AC | 2 | 1 | 3
(Democratic Republic of the Congo) TP Mazembe | 0 | 1 | 1

Preliminary round
(Uganda) Vipers | 1 | 0 | 1
(Nigeria) Enyimba | 0 | 2 | 2
(Lesotho) Lioli | 1 | 1 | 2
(Burundi) Vital'O (a) | 2 | 0 | 2
(Morocco) Olympique Khouribga | 2 | 2 | 4
(The Gambia) Gamtel | 1 | 1 | 2
(Tunisia) Étoile du Sahel | — | — | —
Bye | — | — | —

First round
(Nigeria) Enyimba | 5 | 1 | 6
(Burundi) Vital'O | 1 | 2 | 3
(Morocco) Olympique Khouribga | 1 | 0 | 1
(Tunisia) Étoile du Sahel | 1 | 2 | 3

Second round
(Nigeria) Enyimba (p) | 3 | 0 | 3 (4)
(Tunisia) Étoile du Sahel | 0 | 3 | 3 (3)

Preliminary round
(Mali) Stade Malien | 3 | 1 | 4
(Burkina Faso) RC Bobo Dioulasso | 1 | 0 | 1
(Cameroon) Coton Sport | — | — | —
Bye | — | — | —
(Zambia) ZESCO United | 2 | 1 | 3
(South Sudan) Al-Ghazal | 0 | 0 | 0
(Senegal) AS Douanes Dakar | 0 | 0 | 0
(Guinea) Horoya | 0 | 4 | 4

First round
(Mali) Stade Malien | 2 | 0 | 2
(Cameroon) Coton Sport | 0 | 1 | 1
(Zambia) ZESCO United | 4 | 0 | 4
(Guinea) Horoya | 1 | 2 | 3

Second round
(Mali) Stade Malien | 1 | 1 | 2
(Zambia) ZESCO United | 3 | 2 | 5

Preliminary round
(Eswatini) Mbabane Swallows | 1 | 1 | 2
(Rwanda) APR | 0 | 4 | 4
(Mauritius) Cercle de Joachim | 0 | 0 | 0
(Tanzania) Young Africans | 1 | 2 | 3
(Angola) Recreativo do Libolo | 5 | 4 | 9
(Equatorial Guinea) Racing de Micomeseng | 1 | 0 | 1
(Egypt) Al-Ahly | — | — | —
Bye | — | — | —

First round
(Rwanda) APR | 1 | 1 | 2
(Tanzania) Young Africans | 2 | 1 | 3
(Angola) Recreativo do Libolo | 0 | 0 | 0
(Egypt) Al-Ahly | 0 | 2 | 2

Second round
(Tanzania) Young Africans | 1 | 1 | 2
(Egypt) Al-Ahly | 1 | 2 | 3

Preliminary round
(Comoros) Volcan Club | 0 | — | —
(South Africa) Kaizer Chiefs (w/o) | 4 | — | —
(Chad) AS CotonTchad | 0 | 0 | 0
(Ivory Coast) ASEC Mimosas | 1 | 0 | 1
(Mali) Onze Créateurs | 1 | 0 | 1
(Libya) Al-Ahli Tripoli | 2 | 0 | 2
(Sudan) Al-Hilal | — | — | —
Bye | — | — | —

First round
(South Africa) Kaizer Chiefs | 0 | 0 | 0
(Ivory Coast) ASEC Mimosas | 1 | 0 | 1
(Libya) Al-Ahli Tripoli (a) | 1 | 1 | 2
(Sudan) Al-Hilal | 0 | 2 | 2

Second round
(Ivory Coast) ASEC Mimosas | 2 | 1 | 3
(Libya) Al-Ahli Tripoli | 0 | 2 | 2

Preliminary round
(Liberia) Nimba United | 1 | 0 | 1
(Cameroon) Union Douala | 3 | 1 | 4
(Egypt) Zamalek | — | — | —
Bye | — | — | —
(Tunisia) Club Africain | 2 | 0 | 2
(Ivory Coast) AS Tanda | 0 | 0 | 0
(Ghana) Ashanti Gold | 1 | 1 | 2
(Algeria) MO Béjaïa | 0 | 3 | 3

First round
(Cameroon) Union Douala | 0 | 0 | 0
(Egypt) Zamalek | 1 | 2 | 3
(Tunisia) Club Africain | 1 | 0 | 1
(Algeria) MO Béjaïa | 0 | 2 | 2

Second round
(Egypt) Zamalek | 2 | 1 | 3
(Algeria) MO Béjaïa | 0 | 1 | 1

== Preliminary round ==
The preliminary round included the 46 teams that did not receive byes to the first round.

| Team 1 | Agg. | Team 2 | 1st leg | 2nd leg |
|---|---|---|---|---|
| Mafunzo (Zanzibar) | 0–4 | (Democratic Republic of the Congo) AS Vita Club | 0–3 | 0–1 |
| Centre Chiefs (Botswana) | w/o | (Mozambique) Ferroviário Maputo | — | — |
| Chicken Inn (Zimbabwe) | 1–2 | (South Africa) Mamelodi Sundowns | 1–0 | 0–2 |
| Warri Wolves (Nigeria) | w/o | (São Tomé and Príncipe) Sporting Praia Cruz | — | — |
| AS Mangasport (Gabon) | 0–3 | (Republic of the Congo) Étoile du Congo | 0–0 | 0–3 |
| Wydad AC (Morocco) | 3–2 | (Niger) AS Douanes Niamey | 2–0 | 1–2 |
| Gor Mahia (Kenya) | 1–3 | (Madagascar) CNaPS Sport | 1–2 | 0–1 |
| Saint George (Ethiopia) | 4–1 | (Seychelles) St Michel United | 3–0 | 1–1 |
| Vipers (Uganda) | 1–2 | (Nigeria) Enyimba | 1–0 | 0–2 |
| Lioli (Lesotho) | 2–2 (a) | (Burundi) Vital'O | 1–2 | 1–0 |
| Olympique Khouribga (Morocco) | 4–2 | (The Gambia) Gamtel | 2–1 | 2–1 |
| Stade Malien (Mali) | 4–1 | (Burkina Faso) RC Bobo Dioulasso | 3–1 | 1–0 |
| ZESCO United (Zambia) | 3–0 | (South Sudan) Al-Ghazal | 2–0 | 1–0 |
| AS Douanes Dakar (Senegal) | 0–4 | (Guinea) Horoya | 0–0 | 0–4 |
| Mbabane Swallows (Eswatini) | 2–4 | (Rwanda) APR | 1–0 | 1–4 |
| Cercle de Joachim (Mauritius) | 0–3 | (Tanzania) Young Africans | 0–1 | 0–2 |
| Recreativo do Libolo (Angola) | 9–1 | (Equatorial Guinea) Racing de Micomeseng | 5–1 | 4–0 |
| Volcan Club (Comoros) | w/o | (South Africa) Kaizer Chiefs | 0–4 | — |
| AS CotonTchad (Chad) | 0–1 | (Ivory Coast) ASEC Mimosas | 0–1 | 0–0 |
| Onze Créateurs (Mali) | 1–2 | (Libya) Al-Ahli Tripoli | 1–2 | 0–0 |
| Nimba United (Liberia) | 1–4 | (Cameroon) Union Douala | 1–3 | 0–1 |
| Club Africain (Tunisia) | 2–0 | (Ivory Coast) AS Tanda | 2–0 | 0–0 |
| Ashanti Gold (Ghana) | 2–3 | (Algeria) MO Béjaïa | 1–0 | 1–3 |

13 February 2016
16:30 UTC+3

| Mafunzo (Zanzibar) | 0–3 | (Democratic Republic of the Congo) AS Vita Club |
|---|---|---|
| | Report | Mayimona 6'; Ngudikama 29'; Muzinga 44' |

Amaan Stadium, Zanzibar City
Referee: Eric Gasinzigwa (Burundi)
28 February 2016
15:30 UTC+1

| AS Vita Club (Democratic Republic of the Congo) | 1–0 | (Zanzibar) Mafunzo |
|---|---|---|
| Mkhontfo 63' | Report |

Stade Tata Raphaël, Kinshasa
Referee: Yves Roponat (Gabon)

AS Vita Club won 4–0 on aggregate.

13 February 2016
16:00 UTC+2

| Centre Chiefs (Botswana) | Cancelled | (Mozambique) Ferroviário Maputo |
|---|---|---|
| | Report |

Lobatse Stadium, Lobatse
28 February 2016
15:00 UTC+2

| Ferroviário Maputo (Mozambique) | Cancelled | (Botswana) Centre Chiefs |
|---|---|---|
| | Report |

Ferroviário Maputo won on walkover after Centre Chiefs withdrew.

13 February 2016
15:00 UTC+2

| Chicken Inn (Zimbabwe) | 1–0 | (South Africa) Mamelodi Sundowns |
|---|---|---|
| Katsvairo 34' | Report |

Barbourfields Stadium, Bulawayo
Referee: Kutlwano Leso (Botswana)
27 February 2016
20:15 UTC+2

| Mamelodi Sundowns (South Africa) | 2–0 | (Zimbabwe) Chicken Inn |
|---|---|---|
| Arendse 34'; Mashego 90+1' (pen.) | Report |

Lucas Masterpieces Moripe Stadium, Pretoria
Referee: Andofetra Rakotojaona (Madagascar)

Mamelodi Sundowns won 2–1 on aggregate.

14 February 2016
16:00 UTC+1

| Warri Wolves (Nigeria) | Cancelled | (São Tomé and Príncipe) Sporting Praia Cruz |
|---|---|---|
| | Report |

Warri Township Stadium, Warri
Referee: Daniel Laryea (Ghana)
28 February 2016
15:00 UTC+0

| Sporting Praia Cruz (São Tomé and Príncipe) | Cancelled | (Nigeria) Warri Wolves |
|---|---|---|
| | Report |

Estádio Nacional 12 de Julho, São Tomé
Referee: Kossi Azaleko (Togo)

Warri Wolves won on walkover after Sporting Praia Cruz failed to arrive for the first leg.

13 February 2016
15:30 UTC+1

| AS Mangasport (Gabon) | 0–0 | (Republic of the Congo) Étoile du Congo |
|---|---|---|
| | Report |

Stade Henri Sylvoz, Moanda
Referee: Louis Hakizimana (Rwanda)
28 February 2016
15:30 UTC+1

| Étoile du Congo (Republic of the Congo) | 3–0 | (Gabon) AS Mangasport |
|---|---|---|
| Obassi 6'; Issambet 15'; Ipamy 49' | Report |

Stade Alphonse Massemba-Débat, Brazzaville
Referee: Christopher Nde (Cameroon)

Étoile du Congo won 3–0 on aggregate.

14 February 2016
19:30 UTC+0

| Wydad AC (Morocco) | 2–0 | (Niger) AS Douanes Niamey |
|---|---|---|
| Hajhouj 30'; Abdoulaye 50' (o.g.) | Report |

Stade Mohamed V, Casablanca
Referee: Farouk Houasnia (Algeria)
6 March 2016 (Note: The AS Douanes Niamey v Wydad Casablanca match was postponed due to a strike at Niamey airport.)
16:00 UTC+1

| AS Douanes Niamey (Niger) | 2–1 | (Morocco) Wydad AC |
|---|---|---|
| Dognon 9'; Moussa 48' | Report | Hajhouj 90' (pen.) |

Stade Général Seyni Kountché, Niamey
Referee: Tangba Kambou (Ivory Coast)

Wydad AC won 3–2 on aggregate.

13 February 2016
16:00 UTC+3

| Gor Mahia (Kenya) | 1–2 | (Madagascar) CNaPS Sport |
|---|---|---|
| Agwanda 42' (pen.) | Report | Raherinaivo 13'; Mandampisoa 80' |

Nyayo National Stadium, Nairobi
Referee: Mfaume Ali Nassoro (Tanzania)
27 February 2016
14:30 UTC+3

| CNaPS Sport (Madagascar) | 1–0 | (Kenya) Gor Mahia |
|---|---|---|
| Rakotoharimalala 28' | Report |

Rabemananjara Stadium, Mahajanga
Referee: Nelson Emile (Seychelles)

CNaPS Sport won 3–1 on aggregate.

14 February 2016
16:00 UTC+3

| Saint George (Ethiopia) | 3–0 | (Seychelles) St Michel United |
|---|---|---|
| Girma 16'; Assefa 43'; Chika 80' | Report |

Addis Ababa Stadium, Addis Ababa
Referee: Hassan Mohamed Hagi (Somalia)
27 February 2016
16:00 UTC+4

| St Michel United (Seychelles) | 1–1 | (Ethiopia) Saint George |
|---|---|---|
| Manoo 57' | Report | Lok 16' |

Stade Linité, Victoria
Referee: Osiase Koto (Lesotho)

Saint George won 4–1 on aggregate.

12 February 2016
16:00 UTC+3

| Vipers (Uganda) | 1–0 | (Nigeria) Enyimba |
|---|---|---|
| Ssekisambu 72' | Report |

Nakivubo Stadium, Kampala
Referee: Israel Mpaima (Kenya)
28 February 2016
16:00 UTC+1

| Enyimba (Nigeria) | 2–0 | (Uganda) Vipers |
|---|---|---|
| Udoh 30' (pen.), 61' | Report |

Adokiye Amiesimaka Stadium, Port Harcourt
Referee: Daouda Guèye (Senegal)

Enyimba won 2–1 on aggregate.

14 February 2016
16:00 UTC+2

| Lioli (Lesotho) | 1–2 | (Burundi) Vital'O |
|---|---|---|
| Maba 37' | Report | Mavugo 35'; Shabani 46' |

Setsoto Stadium, Maseru
Referee: Jonas Shongedi (Namibia)
28 February 2016
15:00 UTC+2

| Vital'O (Burundi) | 0–1 | (Lesotho) Lioli |
|---|---|---|
| | Report | Kamele 42' (pen.) |

Prince Louis Rwagasore Stadium, Bujumbura
Referee: Numbi Pierre Kibingo (Congo DR)

2–2 on aggregate. Vital'O won on away goals.

12 February 2016
19:00 UTC+0

| Olympique Khouribga (Morocco) | 2–1 | (The Gambia) Gamtel |
|---|---|---|
| Bezghoudi 46'; Tiberkanine 76' | Report | Sarr 24' |

Stade de Marrakech, Marrakech
Referee: Mohamed Hamada (Mauritania)
27 February 2016
16:00 UTC+0

| Gamtel (The Gambia) | 1–2 | (Morocco) Olympique Khouribga |
|---|---|---|
| Sarr 71' | Report | Koumya 26'; Bezghoudi 90' |

Independence Stadium Bakau
Referee: Fabricio Duarte (Cape Verde)

Olympique Khouribga won 4–2 on aggregate.

13 February 2016
17:00 UTC+0

| Stade Malien (Mali) | 3–1 | (Burkina Faso) RC Bobo Dioulasso |
|---|---|---|
| Ma. Coulibaly 25'; Doumbia 68'; Mo. Coulibaly 87' (pen.) | Report | Kaboré 44' |

Stade Modibo Kéïta, Bamako
Referee: Abubakar Ago (Nigeria)
28 February 2016
15:30 UTC+0

| RC Bobo Dioulasso (Burkina Faso) | 0–1 | (Mali) Stade Malien |
|---|---|---|
| | Report | Siekoua 7' |

Stade Municipal, Bobo-Dioulasso
Referee: Gomno Daouda (Niger)

Stade Malien won 4–1 on aggregate.

14 February 2016
15:00 UTC+2

| ZESCO United (Zambia) | 2–0 | (South Sudan) Al-Ghazal |
|---|---|---|
| Mbombo 8'; Chama 90+4' | Report |

Levy Mwanawasa Stadium, Ndola
Referee: Pilan Ncube (Zimbabwe)
26 February 2016
16:30 UTC+3

| Al-Ghazal (South Sudan) | 0–1 | (Zambia) ZESCO United |
|---|---|---|
| | Report | Ching'andu 88' |

Juba Stadium, Juba
Referee: Belay Tadesse (Ethiopia)

ZESCO United won 3–0 on aggregate.

13 February 2016
17:00 UTC+0

| AS Douanes Dakar (Senegal) | 0–0 | (Guinea) Horoya |
|---|---|---|
| | Report |

Stade Caroline Faye, M'Bour
Referee: Raymond Coker (Sierra Leone)
28 February 2016
17:00 UTC+0

| Horoya (Guinea) | 4–0 | (Senegal) AS Douanes Dakar |
|---|---|---|
| Bangoura 51'; Camara 60'; Dipita 78'; Mandela 90+3' | Report |

Stade du 28 Septembre, Conakry
Referee: Maudo Jallow (Gambia)

Horoya won 4–0 on aggregate.

14 February 2016
15:30 UTC+2

| Mbabane Swallows (Eswatini) | 1–0 | (Rwanda) APR |
|---|---|---|
| Hlatjwayo 26' | Report |

Somhlolo National Stadium, Lobamba
Referee: Norman Matemera (Zimbabwe)
27 February 2016
15:30 UTC+2

| APR (Rwanda) | 4–1 | (Eswatini) Mbabane Swallows |
|---|---|---|
| Rwatubyaye 9', 15', 66'; Sibomana 90' | Report | Mkhweli 28' |

Stade Régional Nyamirambo, Kigali
Referee: Alex Muhabi (Uganda)

APR won 4–2 on aggregate.

13 February 2016
16:00 UTC+4

| Cercle de Joachim (Mauritius) | 0–1 | (Tanzania) Young Africans |
|---|---|---|
| | Report | Ngoma 16' |

Stade George V, Curepipe
Referee: Hubert Andriamiharisoa (Madagascar)
27 February 2016
16:00 UTC+3

| Young Africans (Tanzania) | 2–0 | (Mauritius) Cercle de Joachim |
|---|---|---|
| Tambwe 3'; Kamusoko 56' | Report |

National Stadium, Dar es Salaam
Referee: Amanuel Eyob (Eritrea)

Young Africans won 3–0 on aggregate.

13 February 2016
15:00 UTC+1

| Recreativo do Libolo (Angola) | 5–1 | (Equatorial Guinea) Racing de Micomeseng |
|---|---|---|
| Luiz Phellype 18', 54', 63'; Fredy 85'; Diawara 90' | Report | Keleba 48' |

Estádio Municipal de Calulo, Calulo
Referee: Messie Nkounkou (Congo)
28 February 2016
16:00 UTC+1

| Racing de Micomeseng (Equatorial Guinea) | 0–4 | (Angola) Recreativo do Libolo |
|---|---|---|
| | Report | Diawara 49', 55', 70'; Erivaldo 50' |

Estadio de Bata, Bata
Referee: Raul Aguiar dos Santos (São Tomé and Príncipe)

Recreativo do Libolo won 9–1 on aggregate.

14 February 2016
15:00 UTC+3

| Volcan Club (Comoros) | 0–4 | (South Africa) Kaizer Chiefs |
|---|---|---|
| | Report | Parker 10'; Mathoho 40', 55'; Matovu 89' |

Stade de Moroni, Moroni
Referee: Dennis Nguluwe (Malawi)
28 February 2016
19:30 UTC+2

| Kaizer Chiefs (South Africa) | Cancelled | (Comoros) Volcan Club |
|---|---|---|
| | Report |

Moses Mabhida Stadium, Durban
Referee: Antonio Muachihuissa Caxala (Angola)

Kaizer Chiefs won on walkover after Volcan Club failed to arrive for the second leg.

14 February 2016
15:00 UTC+1

| AS CotonTchad (Chad) | 0–1 | (Ivory Coast) ASEC Mimosas |
|---|---|---|
| | Report | Zakri 72' |

Stade Omnisports Idriss Mahamat Ouya, N'Djamena
Referee: Sadok Selmi (Tunisia)
28 February 2016
15:30 UTC+0

| ASEC Mimosas (Ivory Coast) | 0–0 | (Chad) AS CotonTchad |
|---|---|---|
| | Report |

Stade Félix Houphouët-Boigny, Abidjan
Referee: Baba Leno (Guinea)

ASEC Mimosas won 1–0 on aggregate.

14 February 2016
16:00 UTC+0

| Onze Créateurs (Mali) | 1–2 | (Libya) Al-Ahli Tripoli |
|---|---|---|
| Soumaoro 32' | Report | Shafrod 61'; Al Ghanodi 67' (pen.) |

Stade Modibo Kéïta, Bamako
Referee: Gilberto dos Santos (Guinea-Bissau)
26 February 2016
14:00 UTC+1

| Al-Ahli Tripoli (Libya) | 0–0 | (Mali) Onze Créateurs |
|---|---|---|
| | Report |

Stade Olympique de Sousse, Sousse (Tunisia) (Note: Teams from Libya were not allowed to host their home matches in their country due to security concerns.)
Referee: Mohamed Maarouf (Egypt)

Al-Ahli Tripoli won 2–1 on aggregate.

14 February 2016
16:00 UTC+0

| Nimba United (Liberia) | 1–3 | (Cameroon) Union Douala |
|---|---|---|
| Evanonye 74' | Report | Nlend 6', 34'; Heutchou 24' |

Antoinette Tubman Stadium, Monrovia
Referee: Ousmane Karembe (Mali)
28 February 2016
15:30 UTC+1

| Union Douala (Cameroon) | 1–0 | (Liberia) Nimba United |
|---|---|---|
| Nlend 51' (pen.) | Report |

Stade de la Réunification, Douala
Referee: Idriss Biani (Chad)

Union Douala won 4–1 on aggregate.

14 February 2016
14:00 UTC+1

| Club Africain (Tunisia) | 2–0 | (Ivory Coast) AS Tanda |
|---|---|---|
| Srarfi 50'; Ifa 75' | Report |

Stade Olympique de Radès, Tunis
Referee: Khalid Ennouni (Morocco)
26 February 2016
15:30 UTC+0

| AS Tanda (Ivory Coast) | 0–0 | (Tunisia) Club Africain |
|---|---|---|
| | Report |

Stade Robert Champroux, Abidjan
Referee: Akintoye Koole (Benin)

Club Africain won 2–0 on aggregate.

14 February 2016
15:00 UTC+0

| Ashanti Gold (Ghana) | 1–0 | (Algeria) MO Béjaïa |
|---|---|---|
| Tijani 60' | Report |

Len Clay Stadium, Obuasi
Referee: Jean Ouattara (Burkina Faso)
28 February 2016
18:00 UTC+1

| MO Béjaïa (Algeria) | 3–1 | (Ghana) Ashanti Gold |
|---|---|---|
| Yakubu 10' (o.g.); Khadir 58'; Hamzaoui 61' | Report | Osei 40' |

Stade de l'Unité Maghrébine, Béjaïa
Referee: Sabri Mohamed Fadul (Sudan)

MO Béjaïa won 3–2 on aggregate.

== First round ==
The first round included 32 teams: the 23 winners of the preliminary round, and the 9 teams that received byes to this round.

| Team 1 | Agg. | Team 2 | 1st leg | 2nd leg |
|---|---|---|---|---|
| AS Vita Club (Democratic Republic of the Congo) | 2–1 | (Mozambique) Ferroviário Maputo | 1–0 | 1–1 |
| Mamelodi Sundowns (South Africa) | 3–1 | (Republic of the Congo) AC Léopards | 2–0 | 1–1 |
| Warri Wolves (Nigeria) | 0–2 | (Sudan) Al-Merrikh | 0–1 | 0–1 |
| Étoile du Congo (Republic of the Congo) | 3–5 | (Algeria) ES Sétif | 1–1 | 2–4 |
| Wydad AC (Morocco) | 6–3 | (Madagascar) CNaPS Sport | 5–1 | 1–2 |
| Saint George (Ethiopia) | 2–3 | (Democratic Republic of the Congo) TP Mazembe | 2–2 | 0–1 |
| Enyimba (Nigeria) | 6–3 | (Burundi) Vital'O | 5–1 | 1–2 |
| Olympique Khouribga (Morocco) | 1–3 | (Tunisia) Étoile du Sahel | 1–1 | 0–2 |
| Stade Malien (Mali) | 2–1 | (Cameroon) Coton Sport | 2–0 | 0–1 |
| ZESCO United (Zambia) | 4–3 | (Guinea) Horoya | 4–1 | 0–2 |
| APR (Rwanda) | 2–3 | (Tanzania) Young Africans | 1–2 | 1–1 |
| Recreativo do Libolo (Angola) | 0–2 | (Egypt) Al-Ahly | 0–0 | 0–2 |
| Kaizer Chiefs (South Africa) | 0–1 | (Ivory Coast) ASEC Mimosas | 0–1 | 0–0 |
| Al-Ahli Tripoli (Libya) | 2–2 (a) | (Sudan) Al-Hilal | 1–0 | 1–2 |
| Union Douala (Cameroon) | 0–3 | (Egypt) Zamalek | 0–1 | 0–2 |
| Club Africain (Tunisia) | 1–2 | (Algeria) MO Béjaïa | 1–0 | 0–2 |

13 March 2016
15:30 UTC+1

| AS Vita Club (Democratic Republic of the Congo) | 1–0 | (Mozambique) Ferroviário Maputo |
|---|---|---|
| Ngudikama 83' (pen.) | Report |

Stade Tata Raphaël, Kinshasa
Referee: Amanuel Eyob (Eritrea)
20 March 2016
15:00 UTC+2

| Ferroviário Maputo (Mozambique) | 1–1 | (Democratic Republic of the Congo) AS Vita Club |
|---|---|---|
| Diogo 90+4' | Report | Batezadio 90' |

Estádio da Machava, Maputo
Referee: Victor Gomes (South Africa)

AS Vita Club won 2–1 on aggregate.

12 March 2016
20:15 UTC+2

| Mamelodi Sundowns (South Africa) | 2–0 | (Republic of the Congo) AC Léopards |
|---|---|---|
| Dolly 44'; Castro 46' | Report |

Lucas Masterpieces Moripe Stadium, Pretoria
Referee: Jackson Pavaza (Namibia)
19 March 2016
15:30 UTC+1

| AC Léopards (Republic of the Congo) | 1–1 | (South Africa) Mamelodi Sundowns |
|---|---|---|
| Kalema 89' (pen.) | Report | Kekana 7' |

Stade Denis Sassou Nguesso, Dolisie
Referee: Samuel Chirindza (Mozambique)

Mamelodi Sundowns won 3–1 on aggregate.

13 March 2016
16:00 UTC+1

| Warri Wolves (Nigeria) | 0–1 | (Sudan) Al-Merrikh |
|---|---|---|
| | Report | Jaber 19' |

Warri Township Stadium, Warri
Referee: Juste Ephrem Zio (Burkina Faso)
19 March 2016
20:00 UTC+3

| Al-Merrikh (Sudan) | 1–0 | (Nigeria) Warri Wolves |
|---|---|---|
| Al-Madina 85' (pen.) | Report |

Al-Merrikh Stadium, Omdurman
Referee: Thierry Nkurunziza (Burundi)

Al-Merrikh won 2–0 on aggregate.

13 March 2016
15:30 UTC+1

| Étoile du Congo (Republic of the Congo) | 1–1 | (Algeria) ES Sétif |
|---|---|---|
| Kalonji 86' (pen.) | Report | Djahnit 62' |

Stade Alphonse Massemba-Débat, Brazzaville
Referee: Denis Batte (Uganda)
20 March 2016
18:00 UTC+1

| ES Sétif (Algeria) | 4–2 | (Republic of the Congo) Étoile du Congo |
|---|---|---|
| Dagoulou 3', 48', 64'; Amokrane 30' | Report | Matondo 32'; Issambet 33' |

Stade 8 Mai 1945, Sétif
Attendance: 8,000
Referee: Sadok Selmi (Tunisia)

ES Sétif won 5–3 on aggregate.

12 March 2016
19:45 UTC+0

| Wydad AC (Morocco) | 5–1 | (Madagascar) CNaPS Sport |
|---|---|---|
| Hajhouj 3' (pen.), 29' (pen.); Haddad 8', 13'; Ondama 85' | Report | Vombola 41' |

Stade Mohamed V, Casablanca
Referee: Boubou Traoré (Mali)
19 March 2016
14:30 UTC+3

| CNaPS Sport (Madagascar) | 2–1 | (Morocco) Wydad AC |
|---|---|---|
| Rakotoarimalala 27'; Ratolojanahary 44' (pen.) | Report | Saidi 89' |

Rabemananjara Stadium, Mahajanga
Referee: Andrew Otieno (Kenya)

Wydad AC won 6–3 on aggregate.

13 March 2016
16:00 UTC+3

| Saint George (Ethiopia) | 2–2 | (Democratic Republic of the Congo) TP Mazembe |
|---|---|---|
| Assefa 11', 59' | Report | Adjei 45'; Tamene 46' (o.g.) |

Bahir Dar Stadium, Bahir Dar
Referee: Mbongseni Fakudze (Swaziland)
20 March 2016
15:30 UTC+2

| TP Mazembe (Democratic Republic of the Congo) | 1–0 | (Ethiopia) Saint George |
|---|---|---|
| Bolingi 87' (pen.) | Report |

Stade TP Mazembe, Lubumbashi
Referee: Joshua Bondo (Botswana)

TP Mazembe won 3–2 on aggregate.

13 March 2016
16:00 UTC+1

| Enyimba (Nigeria) | 5–1 | (Burundi) Vital'O |
|---|---|---|
| Chukwude 21', 38'; Udoh 24', 55'; Ugochukwu 85' | Report | Shaban 76' |

Enyimba International Stadium, Aba
Referee: Gomno Daouda (Niger)
19 March 2016
15:00 UTC+2

| Vital'O (Burundi) | 2–1 | (Nigeria) Enyimba |
|---|---|---|
| Nahimana 29'; Mavugo 60' | Report | Ibenegbu 28' |

Prince Louis Rwagasore Stadium, Bujumbura
Referee: Haileyesus Bazezew (Ethiopia)

Enyimba won 6–3 on aggregate.

13 March 2016
16:00 UTC+0

| Olympique Khouribga (Morocco) | 1–1 | (Tunisia) Étoile du Sahel |
|---|---|---|
| Sidibé 63' | Report | Bedoui 34' |

Stade Adrar, Agadir
Referee: Mohamed Ragab Omar (Libya)
19 March 2016
16:30 UTC+1

| Étoile du Sahel (Tunisia) | 2–0 | (Morocco) Olympique Khouribga |
|---|---|---|
| Akaïchi 51'; Dramé 87' | Report |

Stade Olympique de Sousse, Sousse
Referee: Mohamed El Hanafy (Egypt)

Étoile du Sahel won 3–1 on aggregate.

12 March 2016
17:30 UTC+0

| Stade Malien (Mali) | 2–0 | (Cameroon) Coton Sport |
|---|---|---|
| Mo. Coulibaly 44' (pen.); Ma. Coulibaly 65' | Report |

Stade Modibo Kéïta, Bamako
Referee: Cecil Fleischer (Ghana)
20 March 2016
15:00 UTC+1

| Coton Sport (Cameroon) | 1–0 | (Mali) Stade Malien |
|---|---|---|
| Mpondo 68' | Report |

Roumdé Adjia Stadium, Garoua
Referee: Wellington Kaoma (Zambia)

Stade Malien won 2–1 on aggregate.

12 March 2016
15:00 UTC+2

| ZESCO United (Zambia) | 4–1 | (Guinea) Horoya |
|---|---|---|
| Mbombo 11'; Were 27'; Chama 35'; Mwaba 62' | Report | Mandela 64' |

Levy Mwanawasa Stadium, Ndola
Referee: Hamada Nampiandraza (Madagascar)
20 March 2016
17:00 UTC+0

| Horoya (Guinea) | 2–0 | (Zambia) ZESCO United |
|---|---|---|
| Camara 9' (pen.), 45+2' (pen.) | Report |

Stade du 28 Septembre, Conakry
Referee: Kossi Azaleko (Togo)

ZESCO United won 4–3 on aggregate.

12 March 2016
15:30 UTC+2

| APR (Rwanda) | 1–2 | (Tanzania) Young Africans |
|---|---|---|
| Sibomana 90' | Report | Abdul 20'; Kamusoko 75' |

Amahoro Stadium, Kigali
Referee: Duncan Lengani (Malawi)
19 March 2016
16:00 UTC+3

| Young Africans (Tanzania) | 1–1 | (Rwanda) APR |
|---|---|---|
| Ngoma 29' | Report | Nkinzingabo 4' |

National Stadium, Dar es Salaam
Referee: Bernard Camille (Seychelles)

Young Africans won 3–2 on aggregate.

12 March 2016
15:00 UTC+1

| Recreativo do Libolo (Angola) | 0–0 | (Egypt) Al-Ahly |
|---|---|---|
| | Report |

Estádio Municipal de Calulo, Calulo
Referee: Davies Omweno (Kenya)
19 March 2016
18:00 UTC+2

| Al-Ahly (Egypt) | 2–0 | (Angola) Recreativo do Libolo |
|---|---|---|
| Sobhi 10'; Antwi 83' | Report |

Borg El Arab Stadium, Alexandria
Referee: Malang Diedhiou (Senegal)

Al-Ahly won 2–0 on aggregate.

12 March 2016
19:30 UTC+2

| Kaizer Chiefs (South Africa) | 0–1 | (Ivory Coast) ASEC Mimosas |
|---|---|---|
| | Report | Bakayoko 53' |

FNB Stadium, Johannesburg
Referee: Janny Sikazwe (Zambia)
20 March 2016
15:30 UTC+0

| ASEC Mimosas (Ivory Coast) | 0–0 | (South Africa) Kaizer Chiefs |
|---|---|---|
| | Report |

Stade Félix Houphouët-Boigny, Abidjan
Referee: Aurélien Juenkou (Cameroon)

ASEC Mimosas won 1–0 on aggregate.

12 March 2016
14:00 UTC+1

| Al-Ahli Tripoli (Libya) | 1–0 | (Sudan) Al-Hilal |
|---|---|---|
| Ainooson 17' (o.g.) | Report |

Stade Chedli Zouiten, Tunis (Tunisia)
Referee: Bienvenu Sinko (Ivory Coast)
20 March 2016
16:45 UTC+3

| Al-Hilal (Sudan) | 2–1 | (Libya) Al-Ahli Tripoli |
|---|---|---|
| Karika 4' (pen.), 58' | Report | Al Ghanodi 36' |

Al-Hilal Stadium, Omdurman
Referee: Beranger Woungui (Gabon)

2–2 on aggregate. Al-Ahli Tripoli won on away goals

13 March 2016
14:30 UTC+1

| Union Douala (Cameroon) | 0–1 | (Egypt) Zamalek |
|---|---|---|
| | Report | Koffi 58' |

Stade de la Réunification, Douala
Referee: Daniel Bennett (South Africa)
19 March 2016
20:00 UTC+2

| Zamalek (Egypt) | 2–0 | (Cameroon) Union Douala |
|---|---|---|
| Kahraba 26'; Tawfik 88' | Report |

Petro Sport Stadium, Cairo
Referee: Bakary Gassama (Gambia)

Zamalek won 3–0 on aggregate.

12 March 2016
17:00 UTC+1

| Club Africain (Tunisia) | 1–0 | (Algeria) MO Béjaïa |
|---|---|---|
| Chenihi 17' | Report |

Stade Olympique de Radès, Tunis
Referee: Louis Hakizimana (Rwanda)
20 March 2016
18:00 UTC+1

| MO Béjaïa (Algeria) | 2–0 | (Tunisia) Club Africain |
|---|---|---|
| Ndoye 59' (pen.); Betorangal 65' | Report |

Stade de l'Unité Maghrébine, Béjaïa
Attendance: 18,000
Referee: Rédouane Jiyed (Morocco)

MO Béjaïa won 2–1 on aggregate.

== Second round ==
The second round included the 16 winners of the first round.

| Team 1 | Agg. | Team 2 | 1st leg | 2nd leg |
|---|---|---|---|---|
| AS Vita Club (Democratic Republic of the Congo) | 2–2 (a) d/q; w/o | (South Africa) Mamelodi Sundowns | 1–0 | 1–2 |
| Al-Merrikh (Sudan) | 2–2 (a) | (Algeria) ES Sétif | 2–2 | 0–0 |
| Wydad AC (Morocco) | 3–1 | (Democratic Republic of the Congo) TP Mazembe | 2–0 | 1–1 |
| Enyimba (Nigeria) | 3–3 (4–3 p) | (Tunisia) Étoile du Sahel | 3–0 | 0–3 |
| Stade Malien (Mali) | 2–5 | (Zambia) ZESCO United | 1–3 | 1–2 |
| Young Africans (Tanzania) | 2–3 | (Egypt) Al-Ahly | 1–1 | 1–2 |
| ASEC Mimosas (Ivory Coast) | 3–2 | (Libya) Al-Ahli Tripoli | 2–0 | 1–2 |
| Zamalek (Egypt) | 3–1 | (Algeria) MO Béjaïa | 2–0 | 1–1 |

10 April 2016
15:30 UTC+1

| AS Vita Club (Democratic Republic of the Congo) | 1–0 | (South Africa) Mamelodi Sundowns |
|---|---|---|
| Mbombo 90' | Report |

Stade Tata Raphaël, Kinshasa
Referee: Hagi Wiish (Somalia)
20 April 2016
19:30 UTC+2

| Mamelodi Sundowns (South Africa) | 2–1 | (Democratic Republic of the Congo) AS Vita Club |
|---|---|---|
| Nthethe 42' (pen.); Langerman 75' | Report | Mbombo 39' |

Lucas Masterpieces Moripe Stadium, Pretoria
Referee: Aurélien Juenkou (Cameroon)

2–2 on aggregate. AS Vita Club won on away goals.
The CAF announced on 24 May 2016 that Mamelodi Sundowns won on walkover after AS Vita Club were disqualified for fielding an ineligible player in their preliminary round tie against Mafunzo. Mamelodi Sundowns played in the Confederation Cup play-off round before they were reinstated to the Champions League.

9 April 2016
20:00 UTC+3

| Al-Merrikh (Sudan) | 2–2 | (Algeria) ES Sétif |
|---|---|---|
| Abdel-Aati 34', 54' | Report | Dagoulou 15'; Djabou 37' |

Al-Merrikh Stadium, Omdurman
Referee: Joshua Bondo (Botswana)
19 April 2016
19:00 UTC+1

| ES Sétif (Algeria) | 0–0 | (Sudan) Al-Merrikh |
|---|---|---|
| | Report |

Stade 8 Mai 1945, Sétif
Referee: Bakary Gassama (Gambia)

2–2 on aggregate. ES Sétif won on away goals.

9 April 2016
19:30 UTC+1

| Wydad AC (Morocco) | 2–0 | (Democratic Republic of the Congo) TP Mazembe |
|---|---|---|
| Noussir 44'; Hajhouj 65' (pen.) | Report |

Stade de Marrakech, Marrakech
Referee: Mohamed Benouza (Algeria)
20 April 2016
15:30 UTC+2

| TP Mazembe (Democratic Republic of the Congo) | 1–1 | (Morocco) Wydad AC |
|---|---|---|
| Coulibaly 28' | Report | Hajhouj 90' |

Stade TP Mazembe, Lubumbashi
Referee: El Fadil Mohamed (Sudan)

Wydad AC won 3–1 on aggregate.

10 April 2016
16:00 UTC+1

| Enyimba (Nigeria) | 3–0 | (Tunisia) Étoile du Sahel |
|---|---|---|
| Udoh 10' (pen.), 57', 80' | Report |

Adokiye Amiesimaka Stadium, Port Harcourt
Referee: Kokou Fagla (Togo)
20 April 2016
19:00 UTC+1

| Étoile du Sahel (Tunisia) | 3–0 | (Nigeria) Enyimba |
|---|---|---|
| Lahmar 42'; Diogo 60', 71' | Report |
Penalties
| Lahmar (penalty scored); Msakni (penalty scored); Jemal (penalty missed); Nagguez (penalty scored); Bedoui (penalty missed); Ben Amor (penalty missed); Omrani (penalty missed) | 3–4 | (penalty missed) Udoh; (penalty missed) Pyagbara; (penalty scored) Akas; (penalty scored) Kester; (penalty scored) Ojo; (penalty missed) Udoji; (penalty scored) Onyekachi |

Stade Olympique de Sousse, Sousse
Referee: Noureddine El Jaafari (Morocco)

3–3 on aggregate. Enyimba won 4–3 on penalties.

9 April 2016
18:00 UTC+0

| Stade Malien (Mali) | 1–3 | (Zambia) ZESCO United |
|---|---|---|
| Diallo 18' | Report | Mwelwa 45'; Mbombo 75', 85' |

Stade Modibo Kéïta, Bamako
Referee: Ibrahim Nour El Din (Egypt)
19 April 2016
15:00 UTC+2

| ZESCO United (Zambia) | 2–1 | (Mali) Stade Malien |
|---|---|---|
| Were 5'; Mwaba 81' | Report | Mo. Coulibaly 56' |

Levy Mwanawasa Stadium, Ndola
Referee: Victor Gomes (South Africa)

ZESCO United won 5–2 on aggregate.

9 April 2016
16:00 UTC+3

| Young Africans (Tanzania) | 1–1 | (Egypt) Al-Ahly |
|---|---|---|
| Hegazy 19' (o.g.) | Report | Gamal 10' |

National Stadium, Dar es Salaam
Referee: Denis Dembélé (Ivory Coast)
20 April 2016
19:30 UTC+2

| Al-Ahly (Egypt) | 2–1 | (Tanzania) Young Africans |
|---|---|---|
| Ghaly 51'; Said 90' | Report | Ngoma 66' |

Borg El Arab Stadium, Alexandria
Referee: Mahamadou Keita (Mali)

Al-Ahly won 3–2 on aggregate.

9 April 2016
15:30 UTC+0

| ASEC Mimosas (Ivory Coast) | 2–0 | (Libya) Al-Ahli Tripoli |
|---|---|---|
| Dao 58'; Aka 79' | Report |

Stade Robert Champroux, Abidjan
Referee: Hamada Nampiandraza (Madagascar)
20 April 2016
16:00 UTC+1

| Al-Ahli Tripoli (Libya) | 2–1 | (Ivory Coast) ASEC Mimosas |
|---|---|---|
| Al Lafee 32'; Al Ghanodi 80' (pen.) | Report | Zakri 40' |

Stade Chedli Zouiten, Tunis (Tunisia)
Referee: Juste Ephrem Zio (Burkina Faso)

ASEC Mimosas won 3–2 on aggregate.

9 April 2016
20:00 UTC+2

| Zamalek (Egypt) | 2–0 | (Algeria) MO Béjaïa |
|---|---|---|
| Kahraba 58'; Hamoudi 81' | Report |

Petro Sport Stadium, Cairo
Referee: Davies Omweno (Kenya)
19 April 2016
18:00 UTC+1

| MO Béjaïa (Algeria) | 1–1 | (Egypt) Zamalek |
|---|---|---|
| Yaya 57' | Report | Hamoudi 88' |

Stade de l'Unité Maghrébine, Béjaïa
Referee: Youssef Essrayri (Tunisia)

Zamalek won 3–1 on aggregate.
