= 2016 CAF Champions League final =

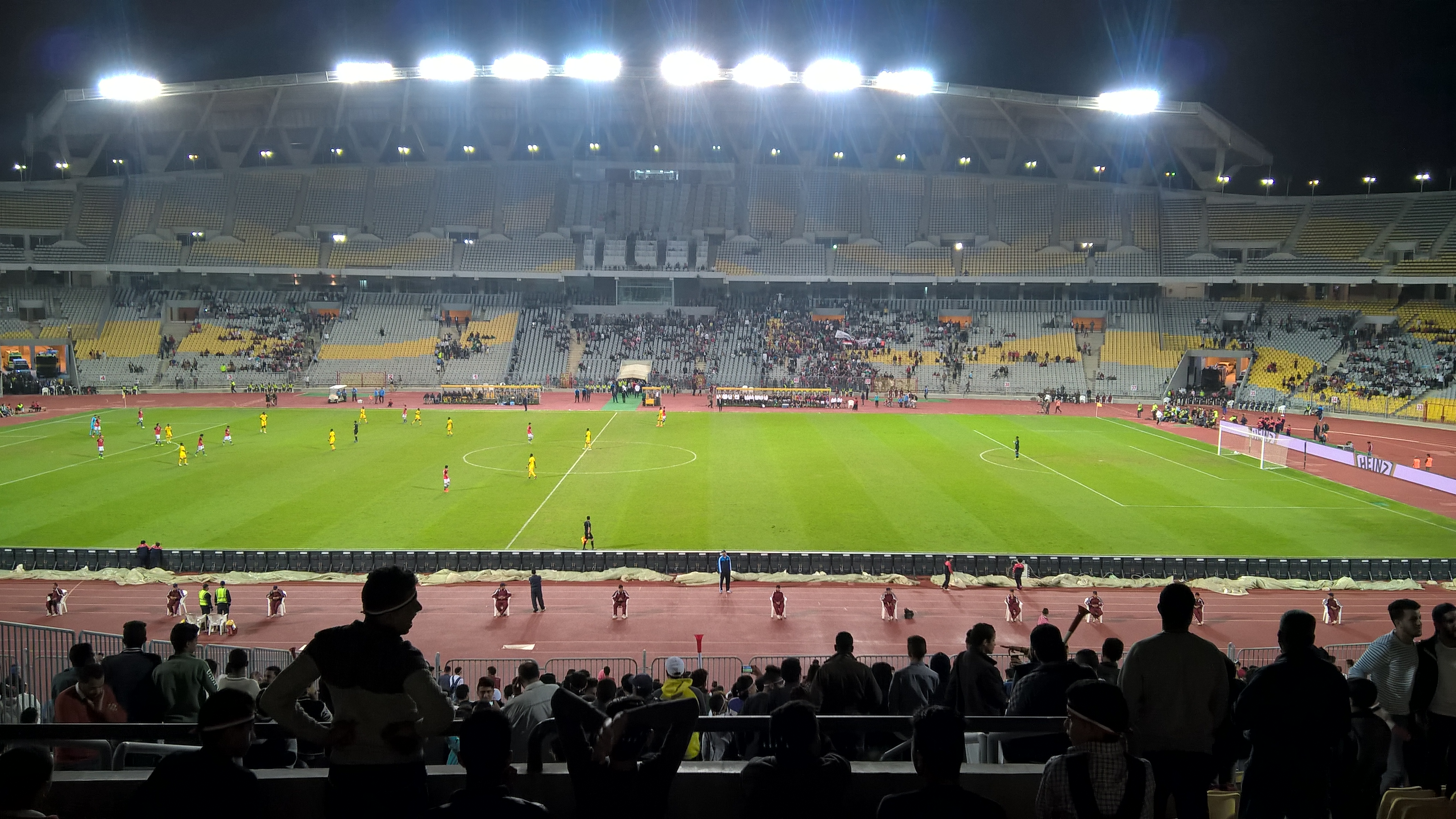
- Borg el Arab Stadium hosted the podium where Mamelodi Sundowns lifted the trophy
- Event: 2016 CAF Champions League
Mamelodi Sundowns	Zamalek
(South Africa)	(Egypt)
3	1
- on aggregate

First leg
Mamelodi Sundowns	Zamalek
3	0
- Date: 15 October 2016
- Venue: Lucas Masterpieces Moripe Stadium, Pretoria
- Referee: Davies Omweno (Kenya)
- Attendance: 30,000

Second leg
Zamalek	Mamelodi Sundowns
1	0
- Date: 23 October 2016
- Venue: Borg El Arab Stadium, Alexandria
- Referee: Bakary Gassama (Gambia)
- Attendance: 70,000

The 2016 CAF Champions League final was the final of the 2016 CAF Champions League, the 52nd edition of Africa's premier club football tournament organized by the Confederation of African Football (CAF), and the 20th edition under the current CAF Champions League format.

The final was contested in two-legged home-and-away format between Mamelodi Sundowns of South Africa and Zamalek of Egypt. The first leg was hosted by Mamelodi Sundowns at the Lucas Masterpieces Moripe Stadium in Pretoria on 15 October 2016, while the second leg was hosted by Zamalek at the Borg El Arab Stadium in Alexandria on 23 October 2016. The winner earned the right to represent the CAF at the 2016 FIFA Club World Cup, entering at the quarterfinal stage, as well as play in the 2017 CAF Super Cup against the winner of the 2016 CAF Confederation Cup.

Mamelodi Sundowns defeated Zamalek 3–1 on aggregate to win the competition for the first time in its history.

== Qualified teams ==
In the following table, finals until 1996 were in the African Cup of Champions Club era, since 1997 were in the CAF Champions League era.

Team	Region	Previous finals appearances (bold indicates winners)
(South Africa) Mamelodi Sundowns	COSAFA (Southern Africa)	2001
(Egypt) Zamalek	UNAF (North Africa)	**1984**, **1986**, **1993**, 1994, **1996**, **2002**

== Venues ==
=== Lucas Masterpieces Moripe Stadium ===
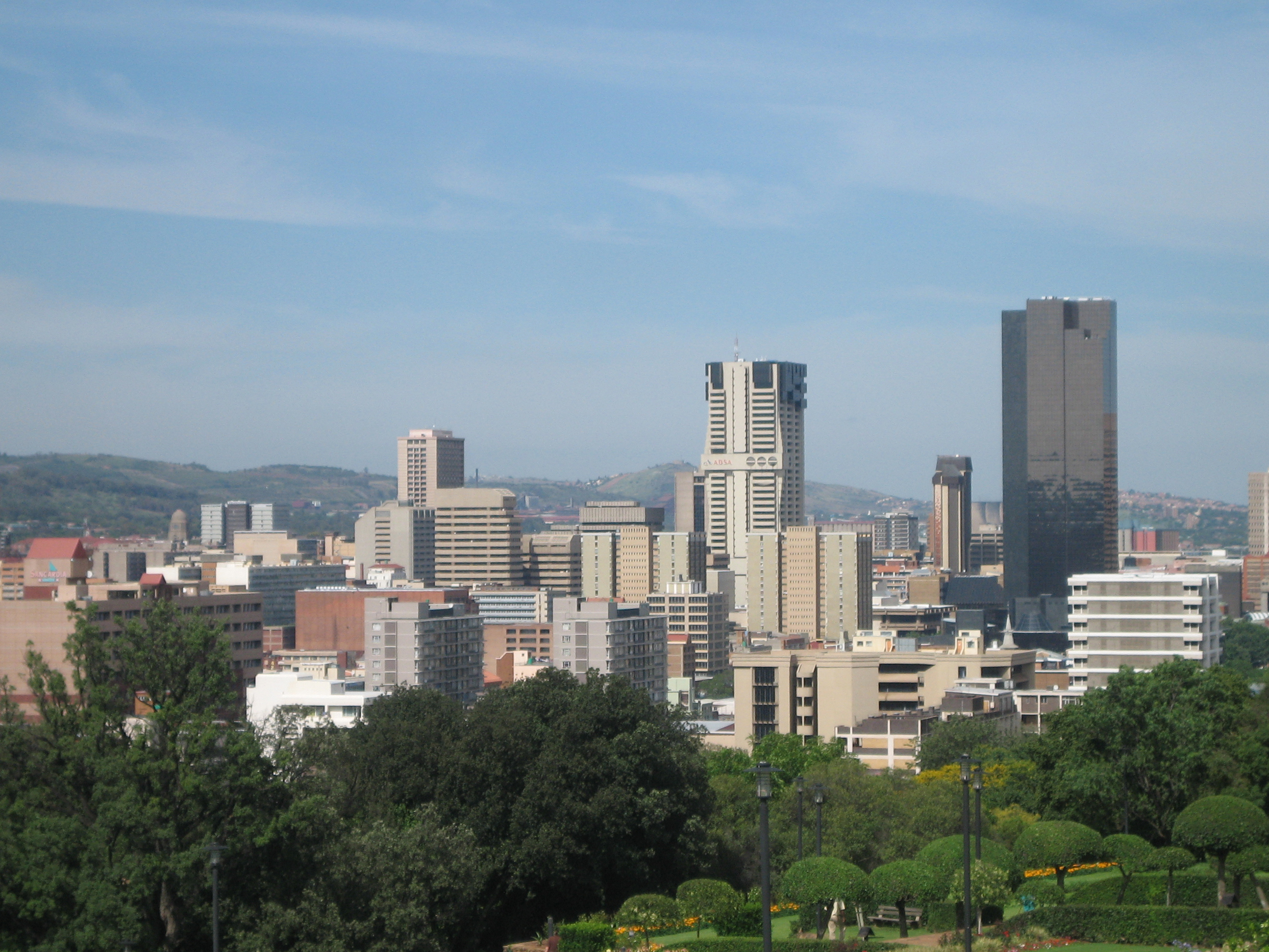
Pretoria, South Africa, hosted the first leg.

Lucas Masterpieces Moripe Stadium is a multi-purpose stadium having a capacity of 28,900 and is located in Atteridgeville, a suburb of Pretoria, South Africa. It is currently used mostly for football matches and serves as part-time home stadium of Premier Soccer League clubs Supersport United and Mamelodi Sundowns who also use the Loftus Versfeld Stadium.

The stadium was named after former local soccer player Lucas Moripe. Until 2010 the stadium was known as Super Stadium.

The Germany national football team used it as a training venue during the 2010 FIFA World Cup.

=== Borg El Arab Stadium ===
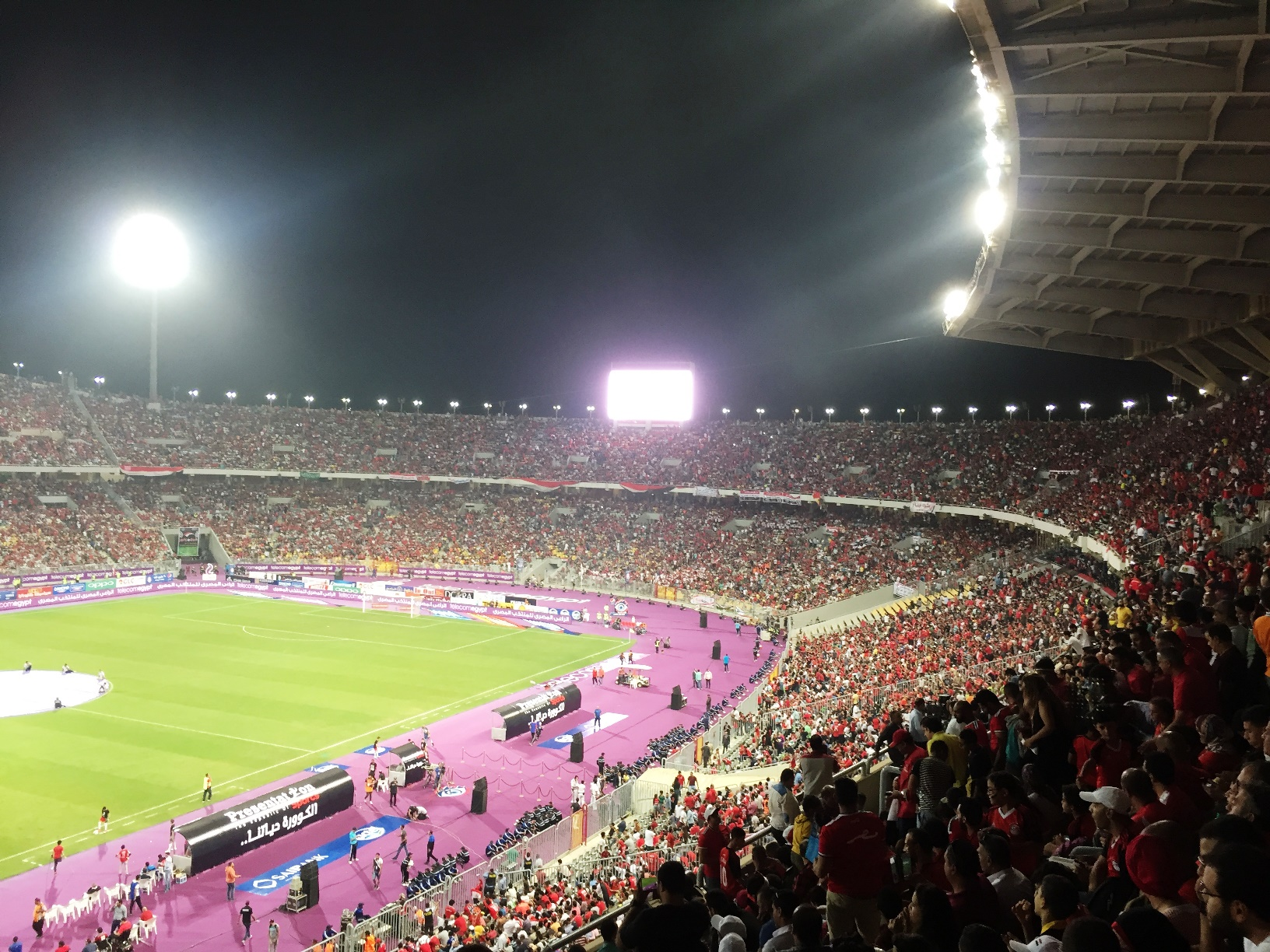
Borg El Arab Stadium in Alexandria, Egypt, hosted the second leg.

Borg El Arab Stadium, is a stadium commissioned in 2005 in the Mediterranean Sea resort of Borg El Arab; 25 km west of Alexandria, Egypt. It is the largest stadium in Egypt and the second largest in Africa (after FNB Stadium in Johannesburg) with a capacity of 86,000 and is an all-seater. It is also the 27th largest stadium in the world, and the 9th largest association football stadium in the world. It is located on the Cairo-Alexandria desert highway 10 km from Borg El Arab Airport and 15 km from Alexandria's city center. A running track runs around the pitch, and the ground has four large floodlights. Only one stand is covered by a roof.

The stadium is 145 feddans, is surrounded by a fence which is 3 km long, an internal road network its long is 6 km, a parking lot which could fit 5000 cars and 200 bus beside an airstrip, there are 136 electronic entrances. The main cabin is covered by an umbrella which covers 35% of the stadium total area, and it is considered the biggest umbrella in the Middle East. Its length is 200 m, its dimension is 60 m and its area is 12,000 m^{2}, which is equal to 3 feddans.

The stadium is air-conditioned and that condition includes the clothes chambers, the salons and entrances, also the stadium includes 8 elevators for broadcasters, handicapped, services and important persons. There are 2 sub-stadiums for training and each ground can hold 2000 spectators, includes 2 locker rooms and a stadium for Athletics. The stadium also includes a hotel for 200 guests which is air-conditioned and has a swimming pool, gym and a department building which contains 80 people. The stadium includes a building which contains 300 presses. This building includes cabinets for broadcasters, entrances for emergency, ambulance cars, 39 and cafeterias, 337 bathrooms which classified to 33 bathrooms for women and 8 bathrooms for the handicapped.

== Road to final ==
Note: In all results below, the score of the finalist is given first (H: home; A: away).

(South Africa) Mamelodi Sundowns				Round	(Egypt) Zamalek			
Opponent	Agg.	1st leg	2nd leg	Qualifying rounds	Opponent	Agg.	1st leg	2nd leg
(Zimbabwe) Chicken Inn	2–1	0–1 (A)	2–0 (H)	Preliminary round	Bye			
(Republic of the Congo) AC Léopards	3–1	2–0 (H)	1–1 (A)	First round	(Cameroon) Union Douala	3–0	1–0 (A)	2–0 (H)
(Democratic Republic of the Congo) AS Vita Club	2–2 (a) d/q; w/o	0–1 (A)	2–1 (H)	Second round	(Algeria) MO Béjaïa	3–1	2–0 (H)	1–1 (A)
Opponent	Result			Group stage	Opponent	Result		
(Algeria) ES Sétif	Annulled (A) (originally 0–2)			Matchday 1	(Nigeria) Enyimba	1–0 (A)		
(Nigeria) Enyimba	2–1 (H)			Matchday 2	(Algeria) ES Sétif	Cancelled (H)		
(Egypt) Zamalek	2–1 (A)			Matchday 3	(South Africa) Mamelodi Sundowns	1–2 (H)		
(Egypt) Zamalek	1–0 (H)			Matchday 4	(South Africa) Mamelodi Sundowns	0–1 (A)		
(Algeria) ES Sétif	Cancelled (H)			Matchday 5	(Nigeria) Enyimba	1–0 (H)		
(Nigeria) Enyimba	1–3 (A)			Matchday 6	(Algeria) ES Sétif	Cancelled (A)		
**Group B winner**: Pos / Team / Pld / Pts; **1** / (South Africa) Mamelodi Sundowns / **4** / **9**; 2 / (Egypt) Zamalek / 4 / **6**; 3 / (Nigeria) Enyimba / 4 / **3**; 4 / (Algeria) ES Sétif / 0 / **0**; Source: CAF				Final standings	**Group B runner-up**: Pos / Team / Pld / Pts; 1 / (South Africa) Mamelodi Sundowns / 4 / **9**; **2** / (Egypt) Zamalek / **4** / **6**; 3 / (Nigeria) Enyimba / 4 / **3**; 4 / (Algeria) ES Sétif / 0 / **0**; Source: CAF			
Opponent	Agg.	1st leg	2nd leg	Knockout stage	Opponent	Agg.	1st leg	2nd leg
(Zambia) ZESCO United	3–2	1–2 (A)	2–0 (H)	Semifinals	(Morocco) Wydad AC	6–5	4–0 (H)	2–5 (A)

Notes

1. The CAF announced on 24 May 2016 that Mamelodi Sundowns won on walkover after AS Vita Club were disqualified for fielding an ineligible player in their preliminary round tie against Mafunzo. Mamelodi Sundowns played in the Confederation Cup play-off round before they were reinstated to the Champions League.
2. The CAF announced on 23 June 2016 that ES Sétif were disqualified for a pitch invasion and other incidents at their home match against Mamelodi Sundowns on 18 June 2016. The result of this match was annulled and not taken into consideration according to the regulations.

== Format ==
The final was played on a home-and-away two-legged basis. If the aggregate score was tied after the second leg, the away goals rule would be applied, and if still tied, extra time would not be played, and the penalty shoot-out would be used to determine the winner (Regulations III. 26 & 27).

== Matches ==
=== First leg ===
15 October 2016
15:00 UTC+2

Mamelodi Sundowns (South Africa)	3–0	(Egypt) Zamalek
Laffor 31'; Langerman 40'; Gamal 46' (o.g.)	Report

Lucas Masterpieces Moripe Stadium, Pretoria
Attendance: 30,000
Referee: Davies Omweno (Kenya)

**Mamelodi Sundowns**	**Zamalek**

Assistant referees:
Berhe O'michael (Eritrea)
Theogene NdagijimanaTahssen (Rwanda)
Fourth official:
Thierry Nkurunziza (Burundi)

=== Second leg ===
23 October 2016
20:30 UTC+2

Zamalek (Egypt)	1–0	(South Africa) Mamelodi Sundowns
Ohawuchi 63'	Report

Borg El Arab Stadium, Alexandria
Attendance: 70,000
Referee: Bakary Gassama (Gambia)

**Zamalek**	**Mamelodi Sundowns**

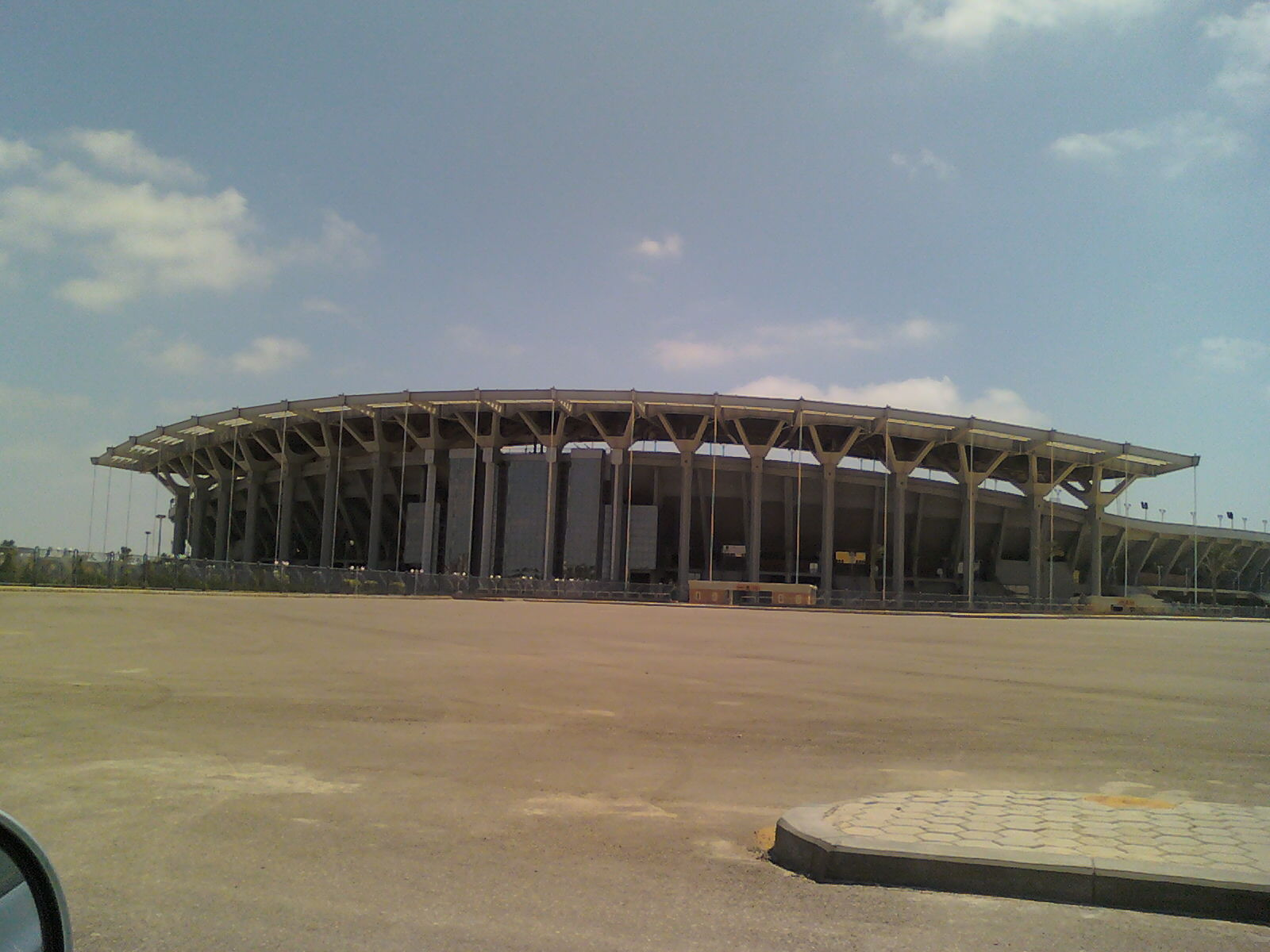
Borg El Arab Stadium in Alexandria, Egypt, hosted the second leg.

Assistant referees:
Jean Claude Birumushahu (Burundi)
Marwa Range (Kenya)
Fourth official:
