= 2016 FIFA Club World Cup squads =

International football competition squads

Each team in the 2016 FIFA Club World Cup had to name a 23-man squad (three of whom must be goalkeepers). Injury replacements were allowed until 24 hours before the team's first match.

== América ==
Manager: (Argentina) Ricardo La Volpe

Note: Flags indicate national team as defined under FIFA eligibility rules; some limited exceptions apply. Players may hold more than one non-FIFA nationality.

| No. | Pos. | Nation | Player |
|---|---|---|---|
| 1 | GK | MEX | Hugo González |
| 2 | DF | ARG | Paolo Goltz |
| 3 | DF | MEX | Gil Burón |
| 4 | DF | MEX | Erik Pimentel |
| 5 | MF | MEX | Javier Güémez |
| 6 | DF | PAR | Miguel Samudio |
| 7 | MF | BRA | William da Silva |
| 9 | FW | ARG | Silvio Romero |
| 10 | MF | PAR | Osvaldo Martínez |
| 11 | MF | ECU | Michael Arroyo |
| 12 | DF | PAR | Pablo Aguilar |
| 13 | GK | MEX | Jonathan León |

| No. | Pos. | Nation | Player |
|---|---|---|---|
| 14 | MF | ARG | Rubens Sambueza (captain) |
| 15 | DF | MEX | Osmar Mares |
| 17 | DF | USA | Ventura Alvarado |
| 18 | DF | PAR | Bruno Valdez |
| 21 | MF | MEX | José Guerrero |
| 23 | GK | MEX | Moisés Muñoz |
| 24 | FW | MEX | Oribe Peralta (vice-captain) |
| 29 | MF | MEX | Carlos Rosel |
| 30 | MF | ECU | Renato Ibarra |
| 31 | FW | COL | Darwin Quintero |
| 37 | DF | MEX | Edson Álvarez |

== Atlético Nacional ==
Atlético Nacional named their squad on 1 December 2016. Andrés Ibargüen withdrew due to injury and was replaced by Cristián Dajome.

Manager: (Colombia) Reinaldo Rueda

Note: Flags indicate national team as defined under FIFA eligibility rules; some limited exceptions apply. Players may hold more than one non-FIFA nationality.

| No. | Pos. | Nation | Player |
|---|---|---|---|
| 1 | GK | COL | Cristian Bonilla |
| 2 | DF | COL | Daniel Bocanegra |
| 3 | DF | COL | Felipe Aguilar |
| 4 | DF | PAN | Roderick Miller |
| 5 | DF | COL | Francisco Nájera |
| 6 | MF | COL | Mateus Uribe |
| 7 | FW | ARG | Ezequiel Rescaldani |
| 8 | MF | COL | Diego Arias |
| 9 | FW | COL | Miguel Borja |
| 10 | MF | COL | Macnelly Torres |
| 12 | DF | COL | Alexis Henríquez |
| 14 | MF | COL | Elkin Blanco |

| No. | Pos. | Nation | Player |
|---|---|---|---|
| 15 | MF | COL | Juan Pablo Nieto |
| 16 | FW | COL | Cristián Dajome |
| 18 | MF | VEN | Alejandro Guerra |
| 19 | DF | COL | Farid Díaz |
| 20 | MF | COL | Alejandro Bernal |
| 21 | MF | COL | Jhon Mosquera |
| 23 | DF | COL | Edwin Velasco |
| 25 | GK | COL | Christian Vargas |
| 28 | FW | COL | Orlando Berrío |
| 30 | FW | COL | Arley Rodríguez |
| 34 | GK | ARG | Franco Armani |

== Auckland City ==
Auckland City named their squad on 29 November 2016.

Manager: (Spain) Ramon Tribulietx

Note: Flags indicate national team as defined under FIFA eligibility rules; some limited exceptions apply. Players may hold more than one non-FIFA nationality.

| No. | Pos. | Nation | Player |
|---|---|---|---|
| 1 | GK | ESP | Eñaut Zubikarai |
| 2 | DF | NZL | Harshae Raniga |
| 3 | DF | JPN | Takuya Iwata |
| 4 | DF | CRO | Mario Bilen |
| 5 | DF | ESP | Ángel Berlanga (captain) |
| 7 | MF | NZL | Reid Drake |
| 8 | MF | ESP | Albert Riera |
| 9 | DF | ENG | Darren White |
| 10 | FW | NZL | Ryan De Vries |
| 11 | MF | MEX | Fabrizio Tavano |
| 12 | FW | NZL | Nicolai Berry |
| 13 | DF | ENG | Alfie Rogers |

| No. | Pos. | Nation | Player |
|---|---|---|---|
| 14 | MF | NZL | Clayton Lewis |
| 15 | DF | NZL | Ivan Vicelich |
| 16 | DF | KOR | Kim Dae-wook |
| 17 | FW | POR | João Moreira |
| 18 | GK | NZL | Danyon Drake |
| 19 | MF | SOL | Micah Lea'alafa |
| 20 | FW | ARG | Emiliano Tade |
| 21 | DF | NZL | Harry Edge |
| 23 | DF | SRB | Marko Đorđević |
| 24 | GK | NZL | Jacob Spoonley |
| 29 | DF | NZL | Sean Cooper |

== Jeonbuk Hyundai Motors ==
Manager: (South Korea) Choi Kang-hee

Note: Flags indicate national team as defined under FIFA eligibility rules; some limited exceptions apply. Players may hold more than one non-FIFA nationality.

| No. | Pos. | Nation | Player |
|---|---|---|---|
| 3 | DF | KOR | Kim Hyung-il |
| 4 | MF | KOR | Shin Hyung-min |
| 7 | MF | KOR | Han Kyo-won |
| 8 | MF | KOR | Jeong Hyuk |
| 9 | FW | KOR | Lee Jong-ho |
| 10 | MF | BRA | Leonardo |
| 13 | MF | KOR | Kim Bo-kyung |
| 15 | DF | KOR | Lim Jong-eun |
| 17 | MF | KOR | Lee Jae-sung |
| 18 | FW | KOR | Ko Moo-yeol |
| 19 | DF | KOR | Park Won-jae |
| 20 | FW | KOR | Lee Dong-gook |

| No. | Pos. | Nation | Player |
|---|---|---|---|
| 21 | GK | KOR | Hong Jeong-nam |
| 23 | DF | KOR | Choi Kyu-baek |
| 25 | DF | KOR | Choi Chul-soon |
| 27 | DF | KOR | Kim Chang-soo |
| 30 | DF | KOR | Kim Young-chan |
| 31 | GK | KOR | Kim Tae-ho |
| 33 | DF | KOR | Lee Han-do |
| 34 | MF | KOR | Jang Yun-ho |
| 41 | GK | KOR | Hwang Byeong-geun |
| 81 | FW | BRA | Edu |
| 99 | FW | KOR | Kim Shin-wook |

== Kashima Antlers ==
Manager: (Japan) Masatada Ishii

Note: Flags indicate national team as defined under FIFA eligibility rules; some limited exceptions apply. Players may hold more than one non-FIFA nationality.

| No. | Pos. | Nation | Player |
|---|---|---|---|
| 1 | GK | JPN | Masatoshi Kushibiki |
| 3 | DF | JPN | Gen Shoji |
| 6 | MF | JPN | Ryota Nagaki (vice-captain) |
| 8 | MF | JPN | Shoma Doi |
| 10 | MF | JPN | Gaku Shibasaki |
| 11 | MF | BRA | Fabrício |
| 13 | MF | JPN | Atsutaka Nakamura |
| 14 | DF | KOR | Hwang Seok-ho |
| 16 | DF | JPN | Shuto Yamamoto |
| 17 | DF | BRA | Bueno |
| 18 | FW | JPN | Shuhei Akasaki |
| 20 | MF | JPN | Kento Misao |

| No. | Pos. | Nation | Player |
|---|---|---|---|
| 21 | GK | JPN | Hitoshi Sogahata |
| 22 | DF | JPN | Daigo Nishi |
| 23 | DF | JPN | Naomichi Ueda |
| 24 | DF | JPN | Yukitoshi Ito |
| 25 | MF | JPN | Yasushi Endo |
| 29 | GK | JPN | Shinichiro Kawamata |
| 32 | MF | JPN | Taro Sugimoto |
| 33 | MF | JPN | Mu Kanazaki |
| 34 | FW | JPN | Yuma Suzuki |
| 35 | MF | JPN | Taiki Hirato |
| 40 | MF | JPN | Mitsuo Ogasawara (captain) |

== Mamelodi Sundowns ==
Manager: (South Africa) Pitso Mosimane

Note: Flags indicate national team as defined under FIFA eligibility rules; some limited exceptions apply. Players may hold more than one non-FIFA nationality.

| No. | Pos. | Nation | Player |
|---|---|---|---|
| 1 | GK | ZAM | Kennedy Mweene |
| 2 | DF | RSA | Thabo Nthethe |
| 4 | DF | RSA | Tebogo Langerman (vice-captain) |
| 5 | MF | RSA | Asavela Mbekile |
| 6 | DF | RSA | Wayne Arendse |
| 7 | MF | RSA | Keagan Dolly |
| 8 | MF | RSA | Hlompho Kekana (captain) |
| 10 | MF | RSA | Teko Modise |
| 11 | MF | RSA | Sibusiso Vilakazi |
| 13 | MF | RSA | Tiyane Mabunda |
| 15 | MF | RSA | Lucky Mohomi |
| 16 | MF | BRA | Ricardo Nascimento |

| No. | Pos. | Nation | Player |
|---|---|---|---|
| 18 | MF | RSA | Themba Zwane |
| 19 | MF | RSA | Mzikayise Mashaba |
| 21 | DF | RSA | Siyanda Zwane |
| 22 | MF | RSA | Percy Tau |
| 25 | FW | COL | Leonardo Castro |
| 27 | MF | RSA | Thapelo Morena |
| 28 | MF | LBR | Anthony Laffor |
| 29 | DF | CIV | Soumahoro Bangaly |
| 33 | MF | ZIM | Khama Billiat |
| 36 | GK | UGA | Denis Onyango |
| 40 | GK | RSA | Wayne Sandilands |

== Real Madrid ==
Manager: (France) Zinedine Zidane

Note: Flags indicate national team as defined under FIFA eligibility rules; some limited exceptions apply. Players may hold more than one non-FIFA nationality.

| No. | Pos. | Nation | Player |
|---|---|---|---|
| 1 | GK | CRC | Keylor Navas |
| 2 | DF | ESP | Dani Carvajal |
| 3 | DF | POR | Pepe (3rd captain) |
| 4 | DF | ESP | Sergio Ramos (captain) |
| 5 | DF | FRA | Raphaël Varane |
| 6 | DF | ESP | Nacho |
| 7 | FW | POR | Cristiano Ronaldo (4th captain) |
| 8 | MF | GER | Toni Kroos |
| 9 | FW | FRA | Karim Benzema |
| 10 | MF | COL | James Rodríguez |
| 12 | DF | BRA | Marcelo (vice-captain) |
| 13 | GK | ESP | Kiko Casilla |

| No. | Pos. | Nation | Player |
|---|---|---|---|
| 14 | MF | BRA | Casemiro |
| 15 | DF | POR | Fábio Coentrão |
| 16 | MF | CRO | Mateo Kovačić |
| 17 | FW | ESP | Lucas Vázquez |
| 18 | FW | DOM | Mariano Díaz |
| 19 | MF | CRO | Luka Modrić |
| 20 | MF | ESP | Marco Asensio |
| 21 | FW | ESP | Álvaro Morata |
| 22 | MF | ESP | Isco |
| 23 | DF | BRA | Danilo |
| 25 | GK | ESP | Rubén Yáñez |
