= 2016 CAF Champions League knockout stage =

The 2016 CAF Champions League knockout stage was played from 16 September to 23 October 2016. A total of four teams competed in the knockout stage to decide the champions of the 2016 CAF Champions League.

== Qualified teams ==
The winners and runners-up of each of the two groups in the group stage qualified for the knockout stage.

Group	Winners	Runners-up
A	(Morocco) Wydad AC	(Zambia) ZESCO United
B	(South Africa) Mamelodi Sundowns	(Egypt) Zamalek

== Format ==
In the knockout stage, the four teams played a single-elimination tournament. Each tie was played on a home-and-away two-legged basis. If the aggregate score was tied after the second leg, the away goals rule would be applied, and if still tied, extra time would not be played, and the penalty shoot-out would be used to determine the winner (Regulations III. 26 & 27).

== Schedule ==
The schedule of each round was as follows.

Round	First leg	Second leg
Semi-finals	16–18 September 2016	23–25 September 2016
Final	14–16 October 2016	21–23 October 2016

== Bracket ==
The bracket of the knockout stage was determined as follows:

- Semi-finals: (group winners host second legs)
  - SF1: Winner Group A vs. Runner-up Group B
  - SF2: Winner Group B vs. Runner-up Group A
- Final: Winner SF1 vs. Winner SF2 (order of legs decided by draw)

Semi-finals
1	(Zambia) ZESCO United	2	0	2
4	(South Africa) Mamelodi Sundowns	1	2	3
3	(Egypt) Zamalek	4	2	6
2	(Morocco) Wydad AC	0	5	5

Final
(South Africa) Mamelodi Sundowns	3	0	3
(Egypt) Zamalek	0	1	1

== Semi-finals ==
In the semi-finals, the group A winners played the group B runners-up, and the group B winners played the group A runners-up, with the group winners hosting the second leg.

Team 1	Agg.	Team 2	1st leg	2nd leg
Zamalek (Egypt)	6–5	(Morocco) Wydad AC	4–0	2–5
ZESCO United (Zambia)	2–3	(South Africa) Mamelodi Sundowns	2–1	0–2

16 September 2016
20:00 UTC+2

Zamalek (Egypt)	4–0	(Morocco) Wydad AC
Shikabala 4'; Hefny 18'; Morsy 49'; Fathi 73' (pen.)	Report

Borg El Arab Stadium, Alexandria
Referee: Daniel Bennett (South Africa)
24 September 2016
21:00 UTC+1

Wydad AC (Morocco)	5–2	(Egypt) Zamalek
Jebor 13', 45'; Haddad 18'; Ondama 56', 63' (pen.)	Report	Morsy 35'; Ohawuchi 82'

Prince Moulay Abdellah Stadium, Rabat
Referee: Sidi Alioum (Cameroon)

Zamalek won 6–5 on aggregate.

17 September 2016
15:30 UTC+2

ZESCO United (Zambia)	2–1	(South Africa) Mamelodi Sundowns
Mwanza 54', 56'	Report	Billiat 86'

Levy Mwanawasa Stadium, Ndola
Referee: Hamada Nampiandraza (Madagascar)
24 September 2016
19:00 UTC+2

Mamelodi Sundowns (South Africa)	2–0	(Zambia) ZESCO United
Laffor 5'; Tau 64'	Report

Lucas Masterpieces Moripe Stadium, Pretoria
Referee: Mehdi Abid Charef (Algeria)

Mamelodi Sundowns won 3–2 on aggregate.

== Final ==
In the final, the two semi-final winners played each other, with the order of legs decided by an additional draw held after the group stage draw.

Team 1	Agg.	Team 2	1st leg	2nd leg
Mamelodi Sundowns (South Africa)	3–1	(Egypt) Zamalek	3–0	0–1

15 October 2016
15:00 UTC+2

Mamelodi Sundowns (South Africa)	3–0	(Egypt) Zamalek
Laffor 31'; Langerman 40'; Gamal 46' (o.g.)	Report

Lucas Masterpieces Moripe Stadium, Pretoria
Attendance: 30,000
Referee: Davies Omweno (Kenya)
23 October 2016
20:30 UTC+2

Zamalek (Egypt)	1–0	(South Africa) Mamelodi Sundowns
Ohawuchi 63'	Report

Borg El Arab Stadium, Alexandria
Attendance: 70,000
Referee: Bakary Gassama (Gambia)

Mamelodi Sundowns won 3–1 on aggregate.
