= 2016 CAF Champions League group stage =

- Dates: 18 June – 24 August 2016

Tournament statistics
- Matches played: 18
- Goals scored: 40 (2.22 per match)

The 2016 CAF Champions League group stage was played from 18 June to 24 August 2016. A total of eight teams competed in the group stage to decide the four places in the knockout stage of the 2016 CAF Champions League.

== Draw ==
The draw for the group stage was held on 24 May 2016, 14:30 EET (UTC+2), at the CAF headquarters in Cairo, Egypt. The eight teams were drawn into two groups of four.

The eight teams, all winners of the second round, were seeded by their performances in the CAF competitions for the previous five seasons (CAF 5-year ranking points shown in parentheses): two teams in Pot 1, two teams in Pot 2, two teams in Pot 3, and two teams in Pot 4. One team from each of the four pots were drawn into each group, with each team then assigned a random "position" in the group to determine the fixtures.

Pot	Pot 1	Pot 2	Pot 3	Pot 4
Teams	(Egypt) Al Ahly (53 pts); (Algeria) ES Sétif (33 pts)	(Egypt) Zamalek (22 pts); (Morocco) Wydad AC (6 pts)	(Ivory Coast) ASEC Mimosas (5 pts); (Nigeria) Enyimba (3 pts)	(South Africa) Mamelodi Sundowns; (Zambia) ZESCO United

== Format ==
In the group stage, each group was played on a home-and-away round-robin basis. The winners and runners-up of each group advanced to the semi-finals.

=== Tiebreakers ===
The teams were ranked according to points (3 points for a win, 1 point for a draw, 0 points for a loss). If tied on points, tiebreakers would be applied in the following order (Regulations III. 20 & 21):

1. Number of points obtained in games between the teams concerned;
2. Goal difference in games between the teams concerned;
3. Goals scored in games between the teams concerned;
4. Away goals scored in games between the teams concerned;
5. If, after applying criteria 1 to 4 to several teams, two teams still have an equal ranking, criteria 1 to 4 are reapplied exclusively to the matches between the two teams in question to determine their final rankings. If this procedure does not lead to a decision, criteria 6 to 9 apply;
6. Goal difference in all games;
7. Goals scored in all games;
8. Away goals scored in all games;
9. Drawing of lots.

== Schedule ==
The schedule of each matchday was as follows.

Matchday	Dates	Matches
Matchday 1	17–19 June 2016	Team 1 vs. Team 2, Team 3 vs. Team 4
Matchday 2	28–29 June 2016	Team 2 vs. Team 3, Team 4 vs. Team 1
Matchday 3	15–17 July 2016	Team 1 vs. Team 3, Team 2 vs. Team 4
Matchday 4	26–27 July 2016	Team 3 vs. Team 1, Team 4 vs. Team 2
Matchday 5	12–14 August 2016	Team 2 vs. Team 1, Team 4 vs. Team 3
Matchday 6	23–24 August 2016	Team 3 vs. Team 2, Team 1 vs. Team 4

== Groups ==
=== Group A ===
Pos	Team	Pld	W	D	L	GF	GA	GD	Pts	Qualification	WAC	ZES	AHL	MIM
1	(Morocco) Wydad AC	6	3	2	1	6	3	+3	11	Knockout stage	—	2–0	0–1	2–1
2	(Zambia) ZESCO United	6	2	3	1	10	9	+1	9	Knockout stage	1–1	—	3–2	3–1
3	(Egypt) Al Ahly	6	1	3	2	6	7	−1	6		0–0	2–2	—	1–2
4	(Ivory Coast) ASEC Mimosas	6	1	2	3	5	8	−3	5		0–1	1–1	0–0	—

Source: CAF
Rules for classification: Group stage tiebreakers
18 June 2016
15:30 UTC+2

ZESCO United (Zambia)	3–2	(Egypt) Al Ahly
Ching'andu 27'; Chama 49', 55'	Report	Antwi 30', 68'

Levy Mwanawasa Stadium, Ndola
Referee: Davies Omweno (Kenya)
18 June 2016
15:30 UTC+0

ASEC Mimosas (Ivory Coast)	0–1	(Morocco) Wydad AC
	Report	Saidi 38'

Stade Robert Champroux, Abidjan
Referee: Bakary Gassama (Gambia)

28 June 2016
22:00 UTC+2

Al Ahly (Egypt)	1–2	(Ivory Coast) ASEC Mimosas
Hegazy 53'	Report	Zakri 29'; Niamke 80'

Borg El Arab Stadium, Alexandria
Referee: El Fadil Mohamed (Sudan)
29 June 2016
22:00 UTC+0

Wydad AC (Morocco)	2–0	(Zambia) ZESCO United
El Karti 12'; Owino 50' (o.g.)	Report

Prince Moulay Abdellah Stadium, Rabat
Referee: Bamlak Tessema Weyesa (Ethiopia)

16 July 2016
15:00 UTC+2

ZESCO United (Zambia)	3–1	(Ivory Coast) ASEC Mimosas
Mwanza 32'; Ching'andu 36'; Mbombo 78'	Report	Dao 76'

Levy Mwanawasa Stadium, Ndola
Referee: Juste Ephrem Zio (Burkina Faso)
16 July 2016
19:30 UTC+2

Al Ahly (Egypt)	0–0	(Morocco) Wydad AC
	Report

Borg El Arab Stadium, Alexandria
Referee: Youssef Essrayri (Tunisia)

27 July 2016
15:30 UTC+0

ASEC Mimosas (Ivory Coast)	1–1	(Zambia) ZESCO United
Koné 75'	Report	Mwanza 80'

Stade Robert Champroux, Abidjan
Referee: Bernard Camille (Seychelles)
27 July 2016
19:30 UTC+1

Wydad AC (Morocco)	0–1	(Egypt) Al Ahly
	Report	Rabia 46'

Prince Moulay Abdellah Stadium, Rabat
Referee: Mehdi Abid Charef (Algeria)

12 August 2016
21:30 UTC+2

Al Ahly (Egypt)	2–2	(Zambia) ZESCO United
Rabia 31'; Moteab 85'	Report	Were 6', 35'

Egyptian Army Stadium, Suez
Referee: Sidi Alioum (Cameroon)
14 August 2016
21:00 UTC+1

Wydad AC (Morocco)	2–1	(Ivory Coast) ASEC Mimosas
Khadrouf 59'; Ondama 89'	Report	Zakri 68'

Prince Moulay Abdellah Stadium, Rabat
Referee: Hamada Nampiandraza (Madagascar)

24 August 2016
14:30 UTC+0

ASEC Mimosas (Ivory Coast)	0–0	(Egypt) Al Ahly
	Report

Stade Robert Champroux, Abidjan
Referee: Daniel Bennett (South Africa)
24 August 2016
16:30 UTC+2

ZESCO United (Zambia)	1–1	(Morocco) Wydad AC
Owino 16'	Report	Chikatara 55'

Levy Mwanawasa Stadium, Ndola
Referee: Joshua Bondo (Botswana)

=== Group B ===
Pos	Team	Pld	W	D	L	GF	GA	GD	Pts	Qualification	MSD	ZAM	ENY	ESS
1	(South Africa) Mamelodi Sundowns	4	3	0	1	6	5	+1	9	Knockout stage	—	1–0	2–1	—
2	(Egypt) Zamalek	4	2	0	2	3	3	0	6	Knockout stage	1–2	—	1–0	—
3	(Nigeria) Enyimba	4	1	0	3	4	5	−1	3		3–1	0–1	—	—
4	(Algeria) ES Sétif	0	0	0	0	0	0	0	0	Disqualified (Note: The CAF announced on 23 June 2016 that ES Sétif were disqualified for a pitch invasion and other incidents at their home match against Mamelodi Sundowns on 18 June 2016. The result of this match was annulled and not taken into consideration according to the regulations.)	~~0–2~~	—	—	—

Source: CAF
Rules for classification: Group stage tiebreakers
Notes:
18 June 2016
22:15 UTC+1

ES Sétif (Algeria)	Annulled (originally 0–2)	(South Africa) Mamelodi Sundowns
	Report	Mabunda 33'; Billiat 63'

Stade 8 Mai 1945, Sétif
Referee: Mahamadou Keita (Mali)
19 June 2016
16:00 UTC+1

Enyimba (Nigeria)	0–1	(Egypt) Zamalek
	Report	Morsy 8'

Adokiye Amiesimaka Stadium, Port Harcourt
Referee: Ali Lemghaifry (Mauritania)

29 June 2016
19:00 UTC+2

Mamelodi Sundowns (South Africa)	2–1	(Nigeria) Enyimba
Castro 42'; Arendse 78'	Report	Ojo 59'

Lucas Masterpieces Moripe Stadium, Pretoria
Referee: Thierry Nkurunziza (Burundi)
29 June 2016
22:00 UTC+2

Zamalek (Egypt)	Cancelled	(Algeria) ES Sétif
	Report

Petro Sport Stadium, Cairo
Referee: Sidi Alioum (Cameroon)

17 July 2016
16:00 UTC+1

Enyimba (Nigeria)	Cancelled	(Algeria) ES Sétif
	Report

Adokiye Amiesimaka Stadium, Port Harcourt
17 July 2016
21:00 UTC+2

Zamalek (Egypt)	1–2	(South Africa) Mamelodi Sundowns
Ibrahim 36'	Report	Mabunda 17'; Billiat 66'

Petro Sport Stadium, Cairo
Referee: Hamada Nampiandraza (Madagascar)

26 July 2016
20:45 UTC+1

ES Sétif (Algeria)	Cancelled	(Nigeria) Enyimba
	Report

Stade 8 Mai 1945, Sétif
27 July 2016
19:30 UTC+2

Mamelodi Sundowns (South Africa)	1–0	(Egypt) Zamalek
Gabr 79' (o.g.)	Report

Lucas Masterpieces Moripe Stadium, Pretoria
Referee: Bakary Gassama (Gambia)

13 August 2016
19:00 UTC+2

Mamelodi Sundowns (South Africa)	Cancelled	(Algeria) ES Sétif
	Report

Lucas Masterpieces Moripe Stadium, Pretoria
15 August 2016
20:30 UTC+2

Zamalek (Egypt)	1–0	(Nigeria) Enyimba
Morsy 63' (pen.)	Report

Petro Sport Stadium, Cairo
Referee: Denis Dembélé (Ivory Coast)

23 August 2016

ES Sétif (Algeria)	Cancelled	(Egypt) Zamalek
	Report

Stade 8 Mai 1945, Sétif
23 August 2016
16:30 UTC+1

Enyimba (Nigeria)	3–1	(South Africa) Mamelodi Sundowns
Uche 24'; Udoh 45', 49' (pen.)	Report	Tau 33'

Adokiye Amiesimaka Stadium, Port Harcourt
Referee: Juste Ephrem Zio (Burkina Faso)
