= 2017 CAF Super Cup =

2017 Total CAF Super Cup
Mamelodi Sundowns	TP Mazembe
(South Africa)	(Democratic Republic of the Congo)
1	0
- Date: 18 February 2017
- Venue: Loftus Versfeld Stadium, Pretoria
- Referee: Gehad Grisha (Egypt)

The 2017 CAF Super Cup (officially the 2017 Total CAF Super Cup for sponsorship reasons) was the 25th CAF Super Cup, an annual football match in Africa organized by the Confederation of African Football (CAF), between the winners of the previous season's two CAF club competitions, the CAF Champions League and the CAF Confederation Cup.

The match was played between Mamelodi Sundowns of South Africa, the 2016 CAF Champions League winners, and TP Mazembe of the Democratic Republic of the Congo, the 2016 CAF Confederation Cup winners. It was hosted by Mamelodi Sundowns at the Loftus Versfeld Stadium in Pretoria on 18 February 2017.

Mamelodi Sundowns defeated TP Mazembe 1–0 to win their first CAF Super Cup.

== Teams ==
Team	Zone	Qualification	Previous appearances (bold indicates winners)
(South Africa) Mamelodi Sundowns	COSAFA (Southern Africa)	2016 CAF Champions League winners	None
(Democratic Republic of the Congo) TP Mazembe	UNIFFAC (Central Africa)	2016 CAF Confederation Cup winners	3 (**2010**, **2011**, **2016**)

== Venue ==
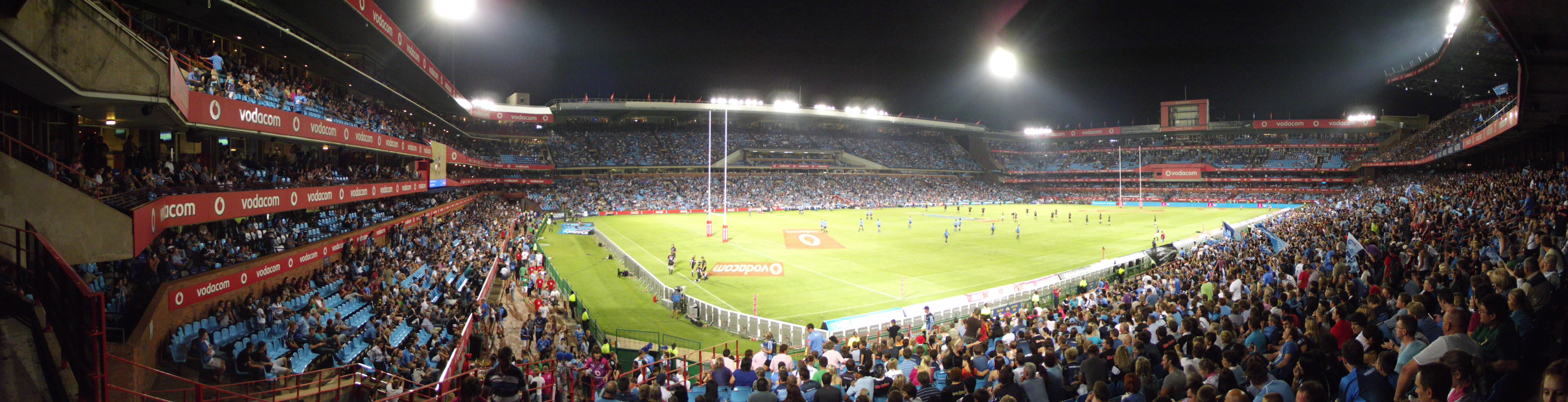
Loftus Versfeld Stadium in Pretoria, South Africa, hosted the match.

== Format ==
The CAF Super Cup was played as a single match, with the CAF Champions League winners hosting the match. If the score was tied at the end of regulation, extra time would not be played, and the penalty shoot-out would be used to determine the winner (CAF Champions League Regulations XXVII and CAF Confederation Cup Regulations XXV).

== Match ==
=== Details ===
18 February 2017
19:00 UTC+2

Mamelodi Sundowns (South Africa)	1–0	(Democratic Republic of the Congo) TP Mazembe
Nascimento 83' (pen.)	Report

Loftus Versfeld Stadium, Pretoria
Referee: Gehad Grisha (Egypt)

**Mamelodi Sundowns**	**TP Mazembe**

GK	14	(Uganda) Denis Onyango
RB	27	(South Africa) Thapelo Morena
CB	6	(South Africa) Wayne Arendse
CB	16	(Brazil) Ricardo Nascimento
LB	4	(South Africa) Tebogo Langerman
CM	13	(South Africa) Tiyane Mabunda
CM	8	(South Africa) Hlompho Kekana (c)
RW	28	(Liberia) Anthony Laffor		(substituted off) 86'
AM	26	(Zimbabwe) Khama Billiat		(substituted off) 90+2'
LW	18	(South Africa) Themba Zwane		(substituted off) 90+3'
CF	22	(South Africa) Percy Tau	(yellow card) 90+5'
Substitutes:
GK	1	(Zambia) Kennedy Mweene
DF	20	(South Africa) Anele Ngcongca		(substituted on) 90+2'
DF	29	(Ivory Coast) Soumahoro Bangaly		(substituted on) 86'
MF	11	(South Africa) Sibusiso Vilakazi		(substituted on) 90+3'
MF	15	(South Africa) Lucky Mohomi
MF	19	(South Africa) Mzikayise Mashaba
FW	25	(Colombia) Leonardo Castro
Manager:
(South Africa) Pitso Mosimane

GK	22	(Ivory Coast) Sylvain Gbohouo
RB	5	(Democratic Republic of the Congo) Issama Mpeko	(yellow card) 88'
CB	2	(Democratic Republic of the Congo) Joël Kimwaki	(yellow card) 38'
CB	6	(Mali) Salif Coulibaly
LB	3	(Democratic Republic of the Congo) Jean Kasusula
CM	13	(Zambia) Nathan Sinkala
CM	19	(Ghana) Daniel Nii Adjei
RW	20	(Ghana) Solomon Asante
AM	18	(Zambia) Rainford Kalaba (c)		(substituted off) 80'
LW	23	(Democratic Republic of the Congo) Elia Meschak		(substituted off) 58'
CF	28	(Democratic Republic of the Congo) Ben Malango
Substitutes:
GK	21	(Democratic Republic of the Congo) Ley Matampi
DF	14	(Zambia) Kabaso Chongo
MF	10	(Zambia) Given Singuluma
MF	16	(Ivory Coast) Christian Koffi
FW	8	(Democratic Republic of the Congo) Trésor Mputu		(substituted on) 58'
FW	9	(Democratic Republic of the Congo) Déo Kanda
FW	11	(Mali) Adama Traoré		(substituted on) 80'
Manager:
(France) Thierry Froger

Assistant referees:
Redouane Achik (Morocco)
Waleed Ahmed Ali (Sudan)
Fourth official:
Youssef Essrayri (Tunisia)

== Prize money ==
The winners would receive $100,000 USD in prize money while the runners-up would receive $75,000 USD.

== See also ==
- 2016 CAF Champions League Final
- 2016 CAF Confederation Cup Final
