= Zwane =

Zwane is a South African surname that may refer to

- Arthur Zwane (born 1973), South African football midfielder
- Gelane Zwane (born 1952), Swazi President of the Senate
- Japhet Zwane (born 1974), South African football winger
- Lungelihle Zwane (born 2000), also known as Uncle Waffles, Swazi-born DJ and record producer
- Mandla Zwane (born 1973), South African football player
- Mosebenzi Zwane, South African Minister of Mineral Resources
- Samkelo Zwane (born 2002), South African football player
- Siyanda Zwane (born 1985), South African football player
- Themba Zwane (born 1989), South African football midfielder
