= Soumahoro Bangaly =

Ivorian footballer (born 1991)

Personal information
- Full name: Soumahoro Bangaly
- Date of birth: 18 July 1991 (age 35)
- Place of birth: Adzopé, Ivory Coast
- Height: 1.90 m (6 ft 3 in)
- Position: Centre back

Senior career*
Years	Team	Apps	(Gls)
–2012	AFAD Djékanou		
2012	Râmnicu Vâlcea	2	(0)
2012–2015	ASEC Mimosas		
2015–2022	Mamelodi Sundowns	40	(1)
2022	→ SuperSport United (loan)	2	(0)
2022–2023	Al-Ansar		
- * Club domestic league appearances and goals as of 6 October 2022

Soumahoro Bangaly (born July 18, 1991) is an Ivorian professional footballer plays as a center back.

== Professional career ==
After a brief passport issue was resolved, Bangaly signed with Romanian Liga II club Râmnicu Vâlcea as a free agent in early 2012. He made his Liga II debut on April 25, 2012, playing the full 90 minutes of a 2–2 draw against Argeș Pitești. He made only one more appearance for Râmnicu Vâlcea before returning to his home country and joining ASEC Mimosas. He was selected as the league's player of the month in May 2015, and was subsequently nominated for the Player of the Year award at the "Ivorian Football Oscars" a few months afterwards.

Bangaly left Ivory Coast once again in September 2015, when he was signed by South African Premier Division club Mamelodi Sundowns to compensate for the loss of Alje Schut, who returned to play in the Netherlands. He made his professional debut with the club on September 15, 2015, during a 2–1 loss to Golden Arrows. He was replaced at halftime by manager Pitso Mosimane after several mistakes, most notably failing to clear a ball which lead to the Golden Arrows' opening goal. It was also obvious he experienced communication issues, as he had hardly learned English. He only received nine minutes of playing time the rest of the calendar year, although reports showed he'd "been settling in and showing improvement in his performances and work rate" by December. By April 2016, he had fully integrated and was a regular member of the starting XI following several impressive performance in the CAF Champions League.

== International career ==
Bangaly is of Guinean descent through his mother, and received a callup to the Guinea national football team in May 2018.

== Honours ==
=== Club ===
Mamelodi Sundowns

- Premier Division: 2015–16,

2017–18

- League Cup: 2015
- MTN 8 Cup: Runners-up 2016
- CAF Champions League: 2016
- CAF Super Cup: 2017
