= Maybin Mwaba =

Zambian footballer (born 1987)

Personal information
- Date of birth: 8 November 1987 (age 38)
- Place of birth: Chingola, Zambia
- Height: 1.70 m (5 ft 7 in)
- Position: Midfielder

Senior career*
Years	Team	Apps	(Gls)
2005–2008	Nchanga Rangers		
2009–2016	Zesco United		

International career^{‡}
2013	Zambia	1	(0)
- * Club domestic league appearances and goals as of 1 August 2020 ‡ National team caps and goals as of 1 August 2020

Maybin Mwaba (born 8 November 1987) is a retired Zambian football midfielder.
