= Koffi Nicolas Dognon =

Beninese footballer

Nicolas Dognon
Personal information
- Full name: Koffi Nicolas Dognon
- Date of birth: 16 June 1989 (age 37)
- Place of birth: Niamey, Niger
- Height: 1.76 m (5 ft 9 in)
- Position: Forward

Senior career*
Years	Team	Apps	(Gls)
2009	Sahel		
2010–2011	Racing Boukoki		
2011–2017	Douanes		
2017–2019	SoNiDeP		

International career^{‡}
2014	Benin	1	(0)
- * Club domestic league appearances and goals as of 1 August 2020 ‡ National team caps and goals as of 1 August 2020

Koffi Nicolas Dognon (born 16 June 1989) is a Niger-born, Beninese retired football striker.
