= Patrick Sibomana =

Rwandan footballer

Personal information
- Full name: Patrick Papy Sibomana
- Date of birth: 15 October 1996 (age 30)
- Place of birth: Kigali, Rwanda
- Height: 1.80 m (5 ft 11 in)
- Position: Midfielder

Team information
- Current team: Al-Wahda Tripoli

Senior career*
Years	Team	Apps	(Gls)
2011–2013	Isonga		
2013–2017	APR		
2017–2018	Shakhtyor Soligorsk	3	(0)
2019	Mukura Victory		
2019–2020	Young Africans		
2020–2022	Police		
2023	Ferroviário da Beira		
2023–2024	Gor Mahia		
2024–2025	Al Ittihad Misurata	5	(1)
2025–	Al-Wahda Tripoli		

International career^{‡}
- Rwanda U17
- Rwanda U20
2013–	Rwanda	17	(2)
- * Club domestic league appearances and goals as of 28 February 2025 ‡ National team caps and goals as of 21 November 2023

Patrick Sibomana (born 15 October 1996) is a Rwandan professional footballer who plays as a midfielder for Al-Wahda Tripoli.

== Career ==
=== International goals ===
Scores and results list Rwanda's goal tally first.

Goal	Date	Venue	Opponent	Score	Result	Competition
1.	6 February 2013	Amahoro Stadium, Kigali, Rwanda	Uganda	2–2	2–2	Friendly
2.	7 June 2015	Amahoro Stadium, Kigali, Rwanda	Tanzania	1–0	2–0	Friendly
