= Jeremiah Kamele =

Mosotho footballer

Personal information
- Position: Defender

Team information
- Current team: Lioli FC

Senior career*
| Years | Team | Apps | (Gls) |
| 2012–2014 | Joy FC | | |
| 2014– | Lioli FC | | |

International career^{‡}
| 2012 | Lesotho | 5 | (1) |
- * Club domestic league appearances and goals as of 1 August 2020 ‡ National team caps and goals as of 1 August 2020

Jeremiah Kamele is a Mosotho footballer who plays as a defender for Lioli FC.
