= Gérôme Heutchou =

Cameroonian footballer

Personal information
- Full name: Gérôme Heutchou Kuilong
- Date of birth: 27 September 1991 (age 35)
- Place of birth: Douala, Cameroon
- Height: 1.89 m (6 ft 2 in)
- Position: Midfielder

Team information
- Current team: APEJES Academy

Senior career*
Years	Team	Apps	(Gls)
2008–2010	Les Astres		
2010–2011	New Star de Douala		
2011–2012	AS Matelots		
2013	Njala Quan		
2014	UMS Loum		
2015	Les Astres		
2016	Union Douala		
2016–2017	FC Cape Town		
2017–2019	Ubuntu Cape Town		
2019–	APEJES Academy		

International career^{‡}
2013	Cameroon	2	(0)
- * Club domestic league appearances and goals as of 1 August 2020 ‡ National team caps and goals as of 1 August 2020

Gérôme Heutchou (born 27 September 1991) is a Cameroonian football midfielder who plays for APEJES Academy.
