= Juma Abdul Mnyamani =

Tanzanian footballer

Personal information
- Full name: Juma Abdul Jaffar Mnyamani
- Date of birth: 10 November 1992 (age 33)
- Place of birth: Dar-es-Salam, Tanzania
- Height: 1.66 m (5 ft 5 in)
- Position: Defender

Team information
- Current team: Young Africans

Senior career*
Years	Team	Apps	(Gls)
2011–2012	Mtibwa Sugar		
2012–	Young Africans		

International career^{‡}
2016–	Tanzania	4	(0)
- * Club domestic league appearances and goals as of 1 August 2020 ‡ National team caps and goals as of 1 August 2020

Juma Abdul Mnyamani (born 10 November 1992) is a Tanzanian football defender who plays for Young Africans.
