= Lucas Moripe =

South African soccer player (1950–2024)

Personal information
- Date of birth: 5 February 1950
- Place of birth: Soweto, Union of South Africa
- Date of death: 19 November 2024 (aged 74)
- Place of death: Atteridgeville, South Africa
- Position: Midfielder

Senior career*
| Years | Team | Apps | (Gls) |
| 1971–? | Pretoria Callies | | |
| 1974–1975 | Caroline Hill | 33 | (7) |
| 1981–? | Orlando Pirates | | |
- * Club domestic league appearances and goals

Lucas "Masterpieces" Moripe (5 February 1950 – 19 November 2024) was a South African soccer player who played as a midfielder.

== Career ==
Moripe was born on 5 February 1950. He began his career in 1971 playing with Pretoria Callies in the NPSL. He was awarded the Player of the Year and Sportsman of the Year title in 1973, and played for a short while with Caroline Hill FC in Hong Kong.

Described as "probably the greatest ball player the country has known" and nicknamed "the god of football" by fans, Moripe was unable to play at a higher level due to the sports boycott of the apartheid government. Moripe joined Orlando Pirates in 1981, although by then he was already suffering from the effects of a persistent knee injury, and retired shortly after.

== Legacy ==
A street in Atteridgeville was named after him, and in 2010, the Atteridgeville Super Stadium was renamed in his honour, to the Lucas Masterpieces Moripe Stadium.

== Personal life and death ==
Moripe had a child with Virginia Mbatha, an Atteridgeville singer. They parted when the child, William Mbatha, was seven. William, nicknamed "King of Bling", is a suspected crime lord and convicted criminal, and Moripe said that he "failed as a father to look after William and guide him as a parent".

Moripe suffered a mild stroke and used crutches as a result of his knee injury. He still attended matches at his namesake stadium. Moripe died at his home on 19 November 2024, at the age of 74.
