= Mamadou Doumbia (footballer, born 1995) =

Malian footballer (born 1995)

Personal information
- Date of birth: 28 December 1995 (age 30)
- Place of birth: Bamako, Mali
- Height: 1.83 m (6 ft 0 in)
- Position: Defender

Team information
- Current team: Young Africans S.C.

Senior career*
Years	Team	Apps	(Gls)
2012–2023	Stade Malien		
2023–	Young Africans S.C.		

International career^{‡}
2015–	Mali	16	(0)
- * Club domestic league appearances and goals as of 1 August 2020 ‡ National team caps and goals as of 13 March 2022

Mamadou Doumbia (born 28 December 1995) is a Malian professional footballer who plays as a defender for Tanzanian Premier League club Young Africans.
