= John Ching'andu =

Zambian footballer (born 1993)

Personal information
- Date of birth: 11 December 1993 (age 32)
- Place of birth: Ndola, Zambia
- Position: Midfielder

Team information
- Current team: ZESCO United
- Number: 11

Senior career*
Years	Team	Apps	(Gls)
2011–	ZESCO United		

International career^{‡}
2012–	Zambia	12	(0)
2015	Zambia U23	1	(0)
- * Club domestic league appearances and goals ‡ National team caps and goals as of 21 July 2020

John Ching'andu (born 11 December 1993) is a Zambian footballer who plays as a midfielder for ZESCO United F.C. and the Zambia national football team.

== Career ==
=== Club ===
Ching'andu is a graduate of the ZESCO United youth system. During the 2021–22 season, he was the club's top scorer with nine goals and was voted the players' player of the year.

=== International ===
Ching'andu made his senior international debut on 6 July 2012, tallying 45 minutes before being subbed off for Kasongo Mwepya in a 1-0 friendly defeat to Malawi. In 2015, Ching'andu was a part of the Zambia U23 squad that competed in the Africa U-23 Cup of Nations, making one appearance, a 66-minute stint off the bench in a 2-1 group stage defeat to Tunisia. He was also included in Zambia's squad for the 2018 COSAFA Cup, appearing in all three matches against Namibia, Madagascar, and Zimbabwe as they finished runners-up.

== Career statistics ==
=== International ===
As of matches played 9 June 2018.

National team	Year	Apps	Goals
Zambia	2012	1	0
Zambia	2017	8	0
Zambia	2018	3	0
Total		12	0

== Honors ==
=== International ===
Zambia

- COSAFA Cup Runner-Up: 2018
