= Siyanda Zwane =

South African soccer player

Personal information
- Full name: Siyanda Desmond Zwane
- Date of birth: 4 June 1985 (age 41)
- Place of birth: Sobantu, South Africa
- Height: 1.78 m (5 ft 10 in)
- Position: Right back

Team information
- Current team: Uthongathi
- Number: 19

Youth career
- Maritzburg City

Senior career*
| Years | Team | Apps | (Gls) |
| 2005–2014 | Golden Arrows | 122 | (0) |
| 2006–2007 | → Nathi Lions (loan) | 15 | (0) |
| 2014–2019 | Mamelodi Sundowns | 31 | (0) |
| 2018–2019 | → Ajax Cape Town (loan) | 10 | (0) |
| 2019–2020 | Bidvest Wits | 5 | (0) |
| 2020– | Uthongathi | 3 | (0) |

International career^{‡}
| 2011– | South Africa | 3 | (0) |
- * Club domestic league appearances and goals as of 20:01, 19 July 2020 (UTC) ‡ National team caps and goals as of 09:37, 12 November 2016 (UTC)

Siyanda Zwane (born 4 June 1985) is a South African international footballer who plays for Uthongathi, as a right back.

== Career ==
After playing youth football with Maritzburg City, Zwane made his senior debut for Golden Arrows in the 2005-06 season. He spent the 2006-07 season on loan at Nathi Lions. He moved to Mamelodi Sundowns for the 2014–15 season. He signed for Ajax Cape Town on loan in January 2018.

In 2011 Zwane made his international debut for South Africa.
