= Samuel Mabunda =

South African soccer player

Personal information
- Full name: Samuel Tiyani Mabunda
- Date of birth: 17 April 1988 (age 38)
- Place of birth: Polokwane, South Africa
- Height: 1.80 m (5 ft 11 in)
- Position: Midfielder

Senior career*
Years	Team	Apps	(Gls)
2009–2010	Arcadia Shepherds		
2010–2013	Black Leopards	58	(5)
2013–2021	Mamelodi Sundowns	77	(1)
2014–2015	→ Free State Stars (loan)	12	(1)

International career^{‡}
2016–2018	South Africa	8	(0)
- * Club domestic league appearances and goals as of 6 October 2022 ‡ National team caps and goals as of 6 October 2022

Samuel Tiyani Mabunda (born 17 April 1988) is a South African professional soccer player who plays as a midfielder.

== Career ==
Born in Polokwane, Mabunda has played club football for Arcadia Shepherds, Black Leopards, Mamelodi Sundowns and Free State Stars. He was released by Sundowns in August 2021.

He made his international debut for South Africa in 2016.
