= Jackson Mwanza =

Zambian footballer (born 1987)

Personal information
- Full name: Jackson Mwanza
- Date of birth: 6 February 1987 (age 39)
- Place of birth: Zambia
- Position: Forward

Senior career*
Years	Team	Apps	(Gls)
2014	ZESCO United F.C.		

International career^{‡}
2015–	Zambia	1	(0)
- * Club domestic league appearances and goals as of 18:34, 7 January 2015 (UTC) ‡ National team caps and goals as of 18:34, 7 January 2015 (UTC)

Jackson Mwanza (born 6 February 1987) is a Zambian professional footballer who plays as a forward.

== Honours ==
ZESCO United

Winner

- Zambian Premier League: 2014

Runner-up

- Zambian Premier League: 2013
