= Islam Gamal =

Egyptian footballer (born 1989)

Eslam Gamal
Personal information
- Full name: Eslam Gamal Fouad Hamed
- Date of birth: 1 March 1989 (age 37)
- Place of birth: Egypt
- Height: 1.75 m (5 ft 9 in)
- Position: Center back

Team information
- Current team: Aswan SC
- Number: 5

Senior career*
Years	Team	Apps	(Gls)
2010–2014	Tala'ea El-Gaish	36	(3)
2014–	Zamalek	28	(0)
2016_2017	→ Ismaily (loan)	19	(1)
2017–2018	→ Petrojet (loan)	5	(0)
2018–2019	Tala'ea El Gaish (loan)		
2019–2020	Al Ittihad	26	(1)
2020-21	Tala'ea El-Gaish SC	16	(0)
2021-22	El-Masry SC	1	(0)
2022-	Aswan SC	8	(0)

International career
2016–	Egypt	2	(0)
- * Club domestic league appearances and goals as of 22 August 2025 @ 09:50(AEST)

Eslam Gamal (Arabic: إسلام جمال) is an Egyptian footballer who currently playing for Egyptian Premier League club Aswan SC.

== International career ==
Gamal has been called up for Egypt for the first time in 2016 for a friendly match against Guinea.

== Honours ==
=== Club ===
Zamalek SC

- Egyptian Premier League: 2014–2015
- Egypt Cup (3): 2015, 2016, 2018
- Egyptian Super Cup: 2016
