= Tebogo Langerman =

South African soccer player

Personal information
- Full name: Tebogo Joseph Langerman
- Date of birth: 6 May 1986 (age 40)
- Place of birth: Johannesburg, South Africa
- Height: 1.80 m (5 ft 11 in)
- Position: Left-back

Youth career
- Ruimsig FC
- Bidvest Wits

Senior career*
Years	Team	Apps	(Gls)
2009	Bidvest Wits	15	(6)
2009–2012	SuperSport United	56	(4)
2012–2021	Mamelodi Sundowns	181	(4)
2021–2022	Moroka Swallows	11	(0)

International career
2013–2017	South Africa	10	(0)
- * Club domestic league appearances and goals as of 9 August 2023

Tebogo Joseph Langerman (born 6 May 1986) is a South African soccer player who played as a left-back for several clubs in the Premier Soccer League and South Africa.

Spending several years at Mamelodi Sundowns, he won the 2016 CAF Champions League. Langerman left in 2021 to play for Moroka Swallows, but was relieved of his contract after the 2021–22 season. He considered other clubs, but began taking coaching licences, starting with the D licence in 2023.
