= Anthony Laffor =

Liberian professional footballer

Personal information
- Full name: Anthony Snoti Laffor
- Date of birth: 17 February 1985 (age 41)
- Place of birth: Monrovia, Liberia
- Height: 1.87 m (6 ft 2 in)
- Position: Winger

Senior career*
Years	Team	Apps	(Gls)
2002	LISCR		
2003–2004	Ashanti Gold		
2005	LISCR	30	(11)
2005–2008	Jomo Cosmos	62	(14)
2008–2012	Supersport United	85	(24)
2012–2020	Mamelodi Sundowns	123	(20)
2021	Chippa United	12	(1)

International career^{‡}
2003–2018	Liberia	47	(5)
- * Club domestic league appearances and goals as of 01:06, 14 November 2021 (UTC) ‡ National team caps and goals as of 14:06, 5 December 2020 (UTC)

Anthony Snoti Laffor (born 17 February 1985) is a Liberian professional footballer who last played as a winger for South African side Chippa United.

== Club career ==
Born in Monrovia, Laffor has played club football in Liberia, Ghana, and South Africa for LISCR, Ashanti Gold, Jomo Cosmos, Supersport United and Mamelodi Sundowns.

He was released by Mamelodi Sundowns in December 2020.

In March 2021 he signed for Chippa United, leaving in July.

== International career ==
He made his international debut for Liberia in 2003. In June 2012, Laffor was expelled from the squad ahead of a 2013 Africa Cup of Nations qualifier but later rejoined the team.

== Career statistics ==
=== International ===
Scores and results list Liberia's goal tally first.

No	Date	Venue	Opponent	Score	Result	Competition
1.	30 April 2008	Antoinette Tubman Stadium, Monrovia, Liberia	Sierra Leone	1–0	3–1	Friendly
2.	24 March 2013	Samuel Kanyon Doe Sports Complex, Monrovia, Liberia	Uganda	2–0	2–0	2014 FIFA World Cup qualification
3.	18 May 2014	Antoinette Tubman Stadium, Monrovia, Liberia	Lesotho	1–0	1–0	2015 Africa Cup of Nations qualification
4.	24 March 2016	El Hadj Hassan Gouled Aptidon Stadium, Djibouti City, Djibouti	Djibouti	1–0	1–0	2017 Africa Cup of Nations qualification
5.	29 March 2016	Antoinette Tubman Stadium, Monrovia, Liberia	Djibouti	1–0	5–0	2017 Africa Cup of Nations qualification
