= Lucas Moripe Stadium =

Football stadium in Atteridgeville

Lucas "Masterpieces" Moripe Stadium
- Interactive map of Lucas "Masterpieces" Moripe Stadium
- Former names: Atteridgeville Super Stadium
- Location: Maunde St., Atteridgeville, Pretoria, South Africa
- Coordinates: 25°46′33.31″S 28°4′22.33″E
- Owner: City of Tshwane
- Capacity: 28,900

Construction
- Renovated: 2008
- Cost: R48 million (2008 refurbishment)

Tenant
- Mamelodi Sundowns

Lucas "Masterpieces" Moripe Stadium is a multi-purpose stadium located in Atteridgeville, a township of Pretoria, South Africa. With a capacity to host 28,900 spectators, it is currently used mostly for soccer matches and serves as part-time home stadium of Premiership clubs Mamelodi Sundowns and, previously, SuperSport United.

The stadium was named after former local soccer player Lucas Moripe. Until 2010 the stadium was known as Super Stadium.

The Germany national football team used it as a training venue during the 2010 FIFA World Cup.
