= 2018 Ligue 1 (Congo) =

Congo Ligue 1
- Season: 2018
- Champions: AS Otohô

The 2018 Ligue 1 is the 51st season of Ligue 1, the top professional league for association football clubs in the Republic of the Congo, since its establishment in 1961. The season started on 27 January 2018 and concluded on 21 October 2018.

== Final standings ==
Pos	Team	Pld	W	D	L	GF	GA	GD	Pts	Qualification or relegation
1	AS Otohô d'Oyo	30	24	3	3	66	16	+50	75	Champions
2	CS La Mancha	30	23	2	5	48	19	+29	71	
3	Diables Noirs	30	21	5	4	68	19	+49	68	
4	AC Léopards de Dolisie	30	18	5	7	46	28	+18	59	
5	CARA	30	14	6	10	38	25	+13	48	
6	AS Cheminots	30	15	3	12	36	29	+7	48	
7	JS Talangaï	30	12	7	11	32	35	−3	43	
8	Etoile du Congo	30	12	6	12	36	37	−1	41 (Note: Etoile du Congo 1 point deducted following incidents in round 20)	
9	Interclub de Brazzaville	30	9	7	14	28	37	−9	34	
10	Tongo FC	30	9	4	17	30	55	−25	31	
11	Vita Club Mokanda	30	8	6	16	17	34	−17	30	
12	Patronage Sainte-Anne	30	9	3	18	18	39	−21	30	
13	Nico-Nicoyé	30	9	1	20	21	48	−27	28	
14	FC Kondzo	30	7	6	17	30	44	−14	27	
15	JS Poto-Poto	30	6	9	15	26	53	−27	27	Relegation to lower division
16	Saint Michel de Ouenzé	30	3	9	18	20	42	−22	18	Relegation to lower division

Updated to match(es) played on unknown. Source:

== See also ==
- 2018 Coupe du Congo
