= 2016 Ligue 1 (Congo) =

Ligue 1
- Season: 2016
- Matches: 272
- Goals: 576 (2.12 per match)
- Biggest home win: 4 matches: Kondzo 5-0 Pigeon Vert (28 January 2016); CARA Brazzaville 5-0 St-Michel Ouenzé (12 February 2016); Étoile du Congo 5-0 Kimbonguila Kinkala (17 March 2016); Tongo FC Jambon 5-0 Munisport (4 August 2016)
- Biggest away win: 3 matches: Kondzo 0-5 JS Poto-Poto (6 February 2016); Kondzo 0-5 Diables Noirs (17 March 2016); Jeunes Fauves 0-5 JS Talangaï (13 April 2016)
- Highest scoring: 5 matches: JS Talangaï 5-1 Chéminots (21 February 2016); Kondzo 3-3 Jeunes Fauves (25 February 2016); Patronage Sainte-Anne 1-5 Diables Noirs (8 August 2016); JS Talangaï 3-3 Munisport (12 August 2016); St-Michel Ouenzé 1-5 CARA Brazzaville (17 August 2016)
- Longest winning run: Léopards de Dolisié (11)
- Longest unbeaten run: Léopards de Dolisié (19)
- Longest winless run: Munisport (17)
- Longest losing run: Pigeon Vert; Tongo FC Jambon (7)
- All statistics correct as of 17 August 2016.

The 2016 Ligue 1 is the 49th season of Ligue 1, the top professional league for association football clubs in the Republic of the Congo, since its establishment in 1961.

The league was abandoned in both 2014 and 2015, due to financial problems and club boycotts, respectively. AC Léopards is the defending champion from the 2013 season.

== Clubs ==
A total of 20 teams will contest the league after expanding from 18 teams with the promotion of Jeunes Fauves and Kimbonguila Kinkala from Ligue 2. Pigeon Vert was also promoted to Ligue 1 when FC Bilombé withdrew from the league.

== Table ==
Pos	Team	Pld	W	D	L	GF	GA	GD	Pts	Qualification or relegation
1	Léopards de Dolisié	27	21	5	1	50	11	+39	68	Qualification for 2017 CAF Champions League
2	JS Poto-Poto	29	17	6	6	35	15	+20	57	Qualification for 2017 CAF Champions League
3	JS Talangaï	25	16	6	3	44	19	+25	54	Qualification for 2017 CAF Confederation Cup
4	CARA Brazzaville	26	15	6	5	40	16	+24	51	
5	Diables Noirs	25	15	4	6	41	19	+22	49	
6	Étoile du Congo	27	13	9	5	45	21	+24	48	
7	La Mancha	29	10	10	9	26	19	+7	40	
8	Inter Club	28	11	3	14	36	35	+1	36	
9	Nico-Nicoyé	27	9	9	9	21	22	−1	36	
10	Kondzo	26	9	8	9	29	33	−4	35	
11	Tongo FC Jambon	29	9	7	13	25	28	−3	34	
12	Ponténégrine	28	7	12	9	25	31	−6	33	
13	Chéminots	27	8	8	11	24	36	−12	32	
14	St-Michel Ouenzé	29	7	9	13	25	38	−13	30	
15	V. Club Mokanda	27	6	11	10	20	29	−9	29	Qualification for Relegation Playoffs
16	Kimbonguila Kinkala	25	7	8	10	18	27	−9	29	Qualification for Relegation Playoffs
17	Patronage Sainte-Anne	28	7	7	14	20	36	−16	28	Relegation to 2017 Ligue 2
18	Jeunes Fauves	29	6	10	13	20	38	−18	28	Relegation to 2017 Ligue 2
19	Munisport	27	2	8	17	21	50	−29	14	Relegation to 2017 Ligue 2
20	Pigeon Vert	26	2	4	20	11	53	−42	10	Relegation to 2017 Ligue 2

Updated to match(es) played on 17 August 2016. Source:
Rules for classification: 1) points; 2) goal difference; 3) number of goals scored.
