= 2018–19 Ligue 1 (Congo) =

Congo Ligue 1
- Season: 2018–19

The 2018–19 Congo Ligue 1 was the 52nd season of the Congo Ligue 1, the top-tier football league in the Republic of the Congo, since its establishment in 1961. The season started on 8 December 2018.

== League table ==
Pos	Team	Pld	W	D	L	GF	GA	GD	Pts	Qualification or relegation
1	AS Otôho (C)	26	20	4	2	55	9	+46	64	Qualification for Champions League
2	Étoile du Congo (Q)	26	16	6	4	46	20	+26	54	Qualification for Confederation Cup
3	Diables Noirs	26	13	8	5	30	19	+11	47	
4	JS Talangaï	26	12	5	9	41	30	+11	41	
5	CARA Brazzaville	26	11	5	10	34	26	+8	38	
6	Tongo FC	26	11	3	12	28	33	−5	36	
7	Vita Club Mokanda	26	10	5	11	23	29	−6	35	
8	Inter Club Brazzaville	26	10	4	12	21	28	−7	34	
9	AC Léopards	26	9	4	13	28	38	−10	31	
10	AS Cheminots	26	8	6	12	24	29	−5	30	
11	Nico-Nicoyé	26	6	10	10	22	30	−8	28	
12	AS Kondzo	26	8	3	15	27	46	−19	27	
13	Patronage Sainte-Anne (Q)	26	6	6	14	26	36	−10	24	Relegation playoff
14	CS La Mancha (R)	26	4	7	15	16	48	−32	19	Relegation

Source: Soccerway
(C) Champions; (Q) Qualified for the phase indicated; (R) Relegated

== Stadiums ==
Team	Location	Stadium	Capacity
AS Otohô	Oyo	Complexe Omnisports d’Oyo	1,629
Étoile du Congo	Brazzaville	Stade Alphonse Massemba-Débat	33,037
CSMD Diables Noirs	Brazzaville	Stade Alphonse Massemba-Débat	33,037
JS Talangaï	Brazzaville	Stade Alphonse Massemba-Débat	33,037
CARA Brazzaville	Brazzaville	Stade Alphonse Massemba-Débat	33,037
Tongo FC	Brazzaville	Stade Alphonse Massemba-Débat	33,037
Vita Club Mokanda	Pointe-Noire	Stade Municipal (Pointe-Noire)	13,594
Inter Club Brazzaville	Brazzaville	Stade Alphonse Massemba-Débat	33,037
AC Léopards	Dolisie	Stade Denis Sassou Nguesso	5,000
AS Cheminots	Pointe-Noire	Stade Municipal (Pointe-Noire)	13,594
Nico-Nicoyé	Pointe-Noire	Stade Municipal (Pointe-Noire)	13,594
AS Kondzo	Brazzaville	Stade Alphonse Massemba-Débat	33,037
Patronage Sainte-Anne	Brazzaville	Stade Alphonse Massemba-Débat	33,037
CS La Mancha	Pointe-Noire	Stade Municipal (Pointe-Noire)	13,594
