= 2013 Congo Premier League =

Congolese Football Federation

Congo Premier League
- Season: 2013
- Biggest home win: AC Léopards 8-0 FC Cuvette

Congo Premier League is the top division of the Congolese Football Federation. The competition was created in 1961. A total of 18 teams will contest the league in 2013.

== Teams ==
- AC Léopards (Dolisie)
- AS Chéminots (Pointe-Noire)
- AS Ponténégrine (Pointe-Noire)
- CARA Brazzaville (Brazzaville)
- CS La Mancha (Pointe-Noire)
- CSMD Diables Noirs (Brazzaville)
- Étoile du Congo (Brazzaville)
- FC Bilombé (Pointe-Noire)
- FC Cuvette (Brazzaville)
- FC Kondzo (Brazzaville)
- Inter Club (Brazzaville)
- JS Talangaï (Brazzaville)
- Muni Sport (Pointe-Noire)
- Nico-Nicoyé (Pointe-Noire)
- Patronage Sainte-Anne (Brazzaville)
- Saint Michel de Ouenzé (Brazzaville)
- Tongo FC Jambon (Brazzaville)
- US Saint Pierre (Pointe-Noire)

== League table ==
- AC Léopards 87
- Diables Noirs 77
- Kondzo 61
- CARA Brazzaville 60
- AS Chéminots 54
- JS Talangaï 52
- Nico-Nicoyé 50
- Étoile du Congo 45
- Saint Michel d'Ouenzé 44
- Tongo FC Jambon 44
- FC Bilombé 43
- CS La Mancha 40
- Patronage Sainte-Anne 39
- AS Ponténégrine 36
- FC Cuvette 30
- Inter Club Brazzaville 29
- Munisport de Pointe-Noire 27
- US Saint Pierre 15
