= 2017 Ligue 1 (Congo) =

Congo Ligue 1
- Season: 2017
- Champions: AC Léopards

The 2017 Ligue 1 is the 50th season of Ligue 1, the top professional league for association football clubs in the Republic of the Congo, since its establishment in 1961. The season started on 21 January 2017 and concluded on 24 September 2017.

== Standings ==
| Pos | Team | Pld | W | D | L | GF | GA | GD | Pts | Qualification or relegation |
|---|---|---|---|---|---|---|---|---|---|---|
| 1 | AC Léopards de Dolisie | 34 | 25 | 6 | 3 | 70 | 22 | +48 | 81 | Champions |
| 2 | AS Otohô d'Oyo | 34 | 22 | 8 | 4 | 49 | 25 | +24 | 74 | |
| 3 | CARA | 34 | 20 | 9 | 5 | 66 | 26 | +40 | 69 | |
| 4 | CF La Mancha | 34 | 19 | 6 | 9 | 46 | 24 | +22 | 63 | |
| 5 | Étoile du Congo | 34 | 17 | 8 | 9 | 44 | 22 | +22 | 58 (Note: 1 point deducted) | |
| 6 | JS Talangaï | 34 | 14 | 11 | 9 | 40 | 35 | +5 | 53 | |
| 7 | Saint Michel de Ouenzé | 34 | 13 | 8 | 13 | 38 | 47 | −9 | 47 | |
| 8 | Patronage Sainte-Anne | 34 | 11 | 10 | 13 | 34 | 32 | +2 | 43 | |
| 9 | Tongo FC | 34 | 11 | 7 | 16 | 37 | 48 | −11 | 40 | |
| 10 | Inter Club Brazzaville | 34 | 11 | 6 | 17 | 34 | 42 | −8 | 39 | |
| 11 | AS Cheminots | 34 | 10 | 9 | 15 | 35 | 46 | −11 | 39 | |
| 12 | JS Poto-Poto | 34 | 10 | 8 | 16 | 30 | 38 | −8 | 38 | |
| 13 | Diables Noirs | 34 | 9 | 12 | 13 | 28 | 37 | −9 | 38 | |
| 14 | FC Kondzo | 34 | 9 | 9 | 16 | 35 | 51 | −16 | 36 | |
| 15 | Nico-Nicoyé | 34 | 8 | 11 | 15 | 30 | 45 | −15 | 35 | Relegation Playoff |
| 16 | FC Nathaly's | 34 | 7 | 9 | 18 | 24 | 53 | −29 | 29 | Relegation Playoff |
| 17 | Jeunes Fauves de Dolisie | 34 | 7 | 8 | 19 | 27 | 42 | −15 | 28 | Relegated |
| 18 | AS Kimbonguéla de Kinkala | 34 | 8 | 5 | 21 | 24 | 56 | −32 | 28 | Relegated |
