= List of football clubs in the Republic of the Congo =

A list of football clubs in the Republic of the Congo: See also Category:Football clubs in the Republic of the Congo

- Elecsport (Bouansa)
- AC Morandzambé (Brazzaville)
- Ajax de Ouenzé (Brazzaville)
- AS Mbako (Brazzaville)
- AS Police (Brazzaville)
- CARA Brazzaville (Brazzaville)
- Club 57 Tourbillon (Brazzaville)
- CSMD Diables Noirs (Brazzaville)
- Étoile du Congo (Brazzaville)
- FC Cuvette (Brazzaville)
- FC Kondzo (Brazzaville)
- Inter Club (Brazzaville)
- JS Talangaï (Brazzaville)
- Kotoko MFOA (Brazzaville)
- Patronage Sainte-Anne (Brazzaville)
- Saint Michel de Loukoléla (Brazzaville)
- Saint Michel de Ouenzé (Brazzaville)
- Tongo FC Jambon (Brazzaville)
- Union Sport (Brazzaville)
- AC Léopards (Dolisie)
- ASICO FC (Dolisie)
- Abeilles FC (Pointe-Noire)
- AS Cheminots (Pointe-Noire)
- AS Ponténégrine (Pointe-Noire)
- CS La Mancha (Pointe-Noire)
- EPB (Pointe-Noire)
- FC Bilombé (Pointe-Noire)
- JS Bougainvillées (Pointe-Noire)
- Muni Sport (Pointe-Noire)
- Nico-Nicoyé (Pointe-Noire)
- Olympic de Nkayi (Pointe-Noire)
- Olympique Vision (Pointe-Noire)
- Pigeon Vert (Pointe-Noire)
- US Saint-Pierre (Pointe-Noire)
- Vita Club Mokanda (Pointe-Noire)
- Le CFA Club de Football d'Angnha (Brazzaville)
