= 2022–23 Ligue 1 (Congo) =

Congo Ligue One
- Season: 2022–23
- Champions: AS Otôho
- Relegated: Patronage Sainte-Anne
- Highest attendance: 15,000 Diables Noirs vs Étoile du Congo

The 2022–23 Congo Ligue One was a season of top-flight football in Congo.

AS Otôho won their sixth straight championship with two match days to spare after defeating JST 3–1, while Diables Noirs finished second and qualifying for the Confederation Cup.

Patronage Sainte-Anne were relegated, and second-bottom AS Cheminots defeated KFA in the two-legged relegation playoff.

Jeunesse Unie de Kintélé were promoted, replacing the relegated Nico-Nicoyé.

== League Table ==
=== Regular season ===
Pos	Team	Pld	W	D	L	GF	GA	GD	Pts	Qualification or relegation
1	AS Otôho (C)	26	19	4	3	42	14	+28	61	Champions, Qualification to the 2023–24 CAF Champions League
2	Diables Noirs	26	14	10	2	48	22	+26	52	Qualification to the 2023–24 CAF Confederation Cup
3	Étoile du Congo	26	13	6	7	30	17	+13	45	
4	Inter Club	26	12	6	8	26	18	+8	42	
5	Léopards de Dolisié	26	11	9	6	31	21	+10	42	
6	Kondzo	26	11	7	8	27	20	+7	40	
7	JS Talangaï	26	11	5	10	26	29	−3	38	
8	Nouvelle Génération	26	7	10	9	23	27	−4	31	
9	V. Club Mokanda	26	7	8	11	17	25	−8	29	
10	CARA Brazzaville	26	6	8	12	24	35	−11	26	
11	Nathaly's	26	6	7	13	13	27	−14	25	
12	Jeunesse Unie de Kintélé	26	7	3	16	16	32	−16	24	
13	AS Cheminots (O)	26	6	6	14	21	34	−13	24	Relegation Play-off
14	Patronage Sainte-Anne (R)	26	5	5	16	19	42	−23	20	Relegation

Rules for classification: 1) points; 2) goal difference; 3) number of goals scored.
(C) Champions; (O) Play-off winners; (R) Relegated

=== Relegation play-off ===
Leg 1: KFA 2–2 Chéminots
Leg 2: Chéminots 1–0 KFA
Chéminots remain in the top flight

== Attendances ==
The 2022–23 Ligue 1 clubs sorted by average home league attendance:

#	Club	Average
1	Diables Noirs	1,812
2	Étoile du Congo	1,523
3	Otohô	812
4	AC Léopards	607
5	CARA	295
6	Inter Club	258
7	Kondzo	234
8	Talangaï	221
9	Nouvelle Génération	199
10	Mokanda	183
11	Nathaly's	168
12	Jeunesse Unie	154
13	Cheminots	142
14	Patronage	129
Average per club		481
