= Harris Tchilimbou =

Congolese football player (born 1988)

Personal information
- Full name: Harris Brandt Tchilimbou Mavoungou
- Date of birth: 11 November 1988 (age 38)
- Place of birth: Brazzaville, Congo
- Height: 1.75 m (5 ft 9 in)
- Position: Midfielder

Team information
- Current team: Bloemfontein Celtic
- Number: 27

Senior career*
Years	Team	Apps	(Gls)
2005–2006	Saint Michel d'Ouenzé		
2007	CARA Brazzaville	25	(5)
2008	AC CNFF	15	(1)
2009	AS Police	27	(3)
2010	Diables Noirs		
2010–2011	Shabab Al-Ordon		
2011	Diables Noirs		
2011–2014	Missile FC		
2014	CARA Brazzaville		
2015	Étoile du Congo		
2016–2017	AC Léopards		
2017–2019	Free State Stars		
2019–	Bloemfontein Celtic	39	(7)

International career^{‡}
2006–2007	Congo U20	10	(0)
2008–	Congo	15	(2)
- * Club domestic league appearances and goals ‡ National team caps and goals as of 21:34, 24 September 2019 (UTC)

Harris Brandt Tchilimbou Mavoungou (born 11 November 1988) is a Congolese football player who is currently playing for Bloemfontein Celtic.

== Career ==
Tchilimbou began his senior career in Saint Michel d'Ouenzé and played two years for the club before signed with CARA Brazzaville. After one year with CARA joined to AC CNFF and later AS Police de Pointe-Noire.

== International career ==
Tchilimbou was member of the Republic of the Congo under-20 team at the 2007 FIFA U-20 World Cup in Canada and played 4 games.

He made his senior cap at the World Cup Qualifying match against Mali on 1 June 2008.

=== International goals ===
Scores and results list Congo's goal tally first.

No	Date	Venue	Opponent	Score	Result	Competition
1.	28 September 2008	Stade Alphonse Massemba-Débat, Brazzaville, Congo	Chad	1–1	2–1	Friendly
2.	15 November 2011	Estádio Nacional 12 de Julho, São Tomé, São Tomé and Principe	São Tomé and Príncipe	5–0	5–0	2014 FIFA World Cup qualification
