= Béni Makouana =

Congolese footballer (born 2002)

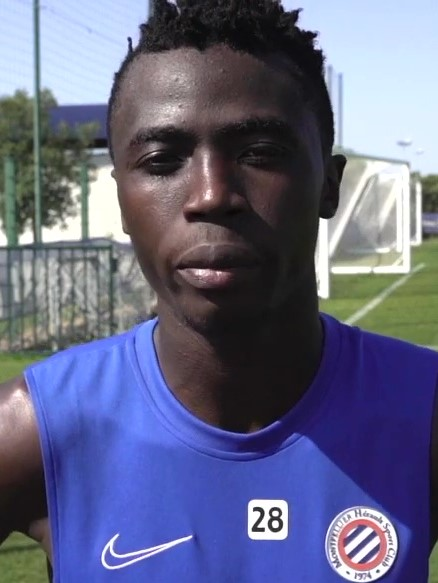
- Makouana with Montpellier in 2021

Personal information
- Date of birth: 28 September 2002 (age 24)
- Place of birth: Brazzaville, Congo
- Height: 1.81 m (5 ft 11 in)
- Position: Forward

Team information
- Current team: Jablonec (on loan from Polissya Zhytomyr)

Youth career
- 2014: CSO Espoir
- 2015: AC Mbila Sport
- 2016: Ajax de Ouenzé
- 2017: JS Poto-Poto
- 2019–2020: Académie SOAR

Senior career*
Years	Team	Apps	(Gls)
2017–2019	Diables Noirs		
2020–2023	Montpellier	31	(0)
2022–2023	Montpellier B	5	(0)
2023–	Polissya Zhytomyr	25	(4)
2025	→ LNZ Cherkasy (loan)	6	(1)
2025–	→ Jablonec (loan)	0	(0)

International career^{‡}
2018–	Congo	7	(0)
- * Club domestic league appearances and goals as of 1 June 2025 ‡ National team caps and goals as of 21:40, 29 January 2022 (UTC)

Béni Makouana (born 28 September 2002) is a Congolese professional footballer who plays as a forward for Czech First League club Jablonec, on loan from Ukrainian Premier League club Polissya Zhytomyr, and the Congo national team.

== Club career ==
During the early part of his career in his native Congo, Makouana won the 2018 Coupe du Congo with the Diables Noirs. He then went on to join Académie SOAR in Guinea in 2019.

On 19 October 2020, he signed for Montpellier in France for a reported transfer fee of €800,000. He was handed the number 28 jersey at the club, and initially began training with the reserve side. On 8 August 2021, Makouana made his professional debut for Montpellier as he came on as a late substitute in a 3–2 Ligue 1 loss to Marseille.

In March 2025, Makouana joined LNZ Cherkasy on loan from fellow Ukrainian Premier League club Polissya Zhytomyr.

On 9 September 2025, Makouana joined Czech First League club Jablonec on a one-year loan deal with an option to buy.

== International career ==
Makouana made his debut for the Congo national team on 11 October 2018, coming on as a substitute in a 3–1 win over Liberia in Africa Cup of Nations qualification.

== Personal life ==
Béni is the grandson of former footballers Gabard and Bolida Makouana, who both played for CARA Brazzaville in the 1960s and 70s.

== Honours ==
Diables Noirs

- Coupe du Congo: 2018

Individual

- Ukrainian Premier League Player of the Month: October 2023
