= Noël Minga =

Congolese footballer (1947–2025)

Personal information
- Full name: Noël Birindi Minga Tchibinda
- Date of birth: 12 July 1947
- Place of birth: Pointe-Noire, Congo, French Equatorial Africa
- Date of death: 25 April 2025 (aged 77)
- Place of death: Brazzaville, Congo–Brazzaville
- Position: Defensive midfielder

Youth career
- ???–1965: Gazelle Mombo

Senior career*
Years	Team	Apps	(Gls)
1965–1971	Patronage Sainte-Anne		
1972–1983	Inter Brazzaville		
Total		77	(7)

International career
1970–1975	Congo–Brazzaville	21	(3)
1972	United Africa	3	(0)

Managerial career
- 1992: Congo–Brazzaville
- 2001: Congo–Brazzaville
- 2010: US Oyem
Medal record
Men's football
Representing Congo
Africa Cup of Nations
Winner	1972 Cameroon
- * Club domestic league appearances and goals

Noël Birindi Minga Tchibinda (12 July 1947 – 25 April 2025) was a Congolese football player and manager. Nicknamed "Pépé", he played as a defensive midfielder for Inter Brazzaville on a club level. He is more well known for his international career as he represented the United Africa team for the Brazil Independence Cup as well as represent his home country of Congo–Brazzaville as a part of the winning squad of the 1972 African Cup of Nations.

== Club career ==
Born on 12 July 1947 in Pointe-Noire, Minga got into football since he was a child and spent his youth career playing for local club Gazelle Mombo with his older brother Albert Minga. His talents would soon make him discovered by Vita Club Mokanda who attempted to sign him for the club, but he ended up playing for Patronage Sainte-Anne where he was part of the winning squad for the 1968 Congo Ligue 1. He then played for Inter Brazzaville in 1972 and would continue until his retirement in 1983.

== International career ==
Minga was more known for his international career as he began playing for his home country of Congo–Brazzaville in 1970. For the upcoming Brazil Independence Cup, Minga was a part of the 28-man squad for the United Africa team as he made three appearances and didn't score a single goal in the Group Stage. The exodus of his career came in the 1972 African Cup of Nations as he was a part of the 22-man squad of the tournament. He gained further prestige as during the semi-finals against hosts Cameroon by scoring the winning goal at 31 minutes and 43 seconds following a series of passes and plays by François M'Pelé and Gabriel Dengaki. This success continued into the 1974 African Cup of Nations where he scored a goal against Zaire in the Group Stage, narrowly losing to Zambia in the semi-finals. He made a total of 21 appearances and 3 goals in his five years of international football.

== Managerial career ==
Minga returned in the international stage to represent Congo–Brazzaville on two occasions. His first tenure was overseeing the Les Diables Rouges for the 1992 African Cup of Nations following a 14-year drought from qualifying as the team would make the knockout stage but ended up losing to Ghana. His second tenure came in 2001 as an interim manager. He later worked in Gabon as manager for US Oyem in 2010.

== Death ==
Minga died on 25 April 2025 in Brazzaville following several months of illness dating back to February. His funeral was later held on 13 May by his former club, Inter Brazzaville with the club's 1st vice president Jean-Marie Apébé finding inspiration from Minga's goal against Cameroon 53 years ago.
