= Sidoine Beaullia =

Congolese footballer

Personal information
- Full name: Hermann Sidoine Beaullia
- Date of birth: 28 August 1983 (age 43)
- Position: Midfielder

Senior career*
Years	Team	Apps	(Gls)
2001–2003	AS Police		
2004	Étoile du Congo		
2005	AS Police		
2006	Saint Michel d'Ouenzé		
2007	Diables Noirs		
2008	Étoile du Congo		
2009–2011	Inter Brazzaville		
2012	JS Talangaï		
2013	AC Léopards		

International career
2001–2007	Congo	12	(2)
- * Club domestic league appearances and goals

Sidoine Beaullia (born 28 August 1983) is a Congolese retired football midfielder.
