= Jean-Paul Mpila =

Congolese football manager

Personal information
- Date of birth: 29 November 1960 (age 65)
- Place of birth: Brazzaville, Congo

Managerial career
- Years: Team
- 1988–199?: Kotoko de Mfoa
- 1996: Patronage Sainte-Anne
- 199?–200?: Étoile du Congo
- 200?: CARA Brazzaville
- 200?–200?: Club 57 Tourbillon
- 2006–2008: Congo Women
- 2007–2009: Saint Michel d'Ouenzé
- 2010: Patronage Sainte-Anne
- 2010: Equatorial Guinea Women U15
- 2010: Equatorial Guinea Women
- 2018–2022: Equatorial Guinea Women

Jean-Paul Mpila (born 29 November 1960) is a Congolese football manager.

== Managerial career ==
Mpila has managed Kotoko de Mfoa, Patronage Sainte-Anne (two stints), Étoile du Congo, CARA Brazzaville, Club 57 Tourbillon, the Congo women's national football team, Saint Michel d'Ouenzé and the Equatorial Guinea women's national football team at the 2010 Summer Youth Olympics and two Africa Women Cup of Nations editions (2010 and 2018).

In May 2022, Mpila went to Paris, France with his lawyer to denounce the Equatoguinean Football Federation to FIFA for breach of his contract as manager of the women's national team.
