= Gabriel Dengaki =

Congolese footballer (1952–2025)

Personal information
- Full name: Gabriel Alphonse Dengaki
- Date of birth: 7 November 1952
- Place of birth: Brazzaville, Congo–Brazzaville
- Date of death: 6 January 2025 (aged 72)
- Place of death: Brazzaville, Congo–Brazzaville
- Height: 1.80 m (5 ft 11 in)
- Position: Right-back

Senior career*
Years	Team	Apps	(Gls)
1970–1973	Étoile du Congo		
1974–1975	CARA Brazzaville		
1976–1981	Étoile du Congo		

International career
1972–1977	Congo	17	(0)

Managerial career
- 2013: AS Cheminots
- 2014–2015: AS Otohô
Medal record
Men's football
Representing Congo
Africa Cup of Nations
Winner	1972 Cameroon
- * Club domestic league appearances and goals

Gabriel Alphonse Dengaki (7 November 1952 – 6 January 2025) was a Congolese football player and manager. He played for Étoile du Congo and CARA Brazzaville throughout the 1970s, earning several titles with the two clubs. He also represented his home country of Congo internationally, being part of the winning squad for the 1972 African Cup of Nations.

== Club career ==
Dengaki began his career with Étoile du Congo in 1970. His first tenure with the club wouldn't find much success due to either other clubs winning the Congo Ligue 1 or the tournament not being held such as in the 1972 edition. Following that, he transferred over to CARA Brazzaville where he found considerably more success as he won the 1974 African Cup of Champions Clubs as well as the 1975 Ligue 1. This success would continue upon his return to Étoile du Congo in 1976 as he was a part of the club's dynasty of the late 1970s, winning the 1977–78, 1979 and 1980 editions of the tournament before his retirement in 1981. He was also named the best Congolese footballer of 1976.

== International career ==
Dengaki was first called up for the Congo national football team in the 1972 African Cup of Nations held in Cameroon. During the tournament, he'd help the Red Devils reach second in the group stage, knock out hosts Cameroon in the semi-finals and beat Mali in the final, earning the club's only title in the tournament as of 2026. Despite winning the tournament, each player was only given only 50,000 FCFA (76 Euro) and a plot of land.

== Managerial career ==
During the 2013 Congo Premier League, Dengaki briefly managed AS Cheminots for five days before getting sacked due to poor results as he was replaced with Benoît Nkokolo and later, Amigo Ntumba. He later managed AS Otohô for the 2014 and 2015 editions of the Ligue 2.

== Later life ==
Following his retirement, Dengaki worked as a physical education teacher in Brazzaville before his retirement in 2012. He later got married and was the father of ten children. In the 50th anniversary of the Congolese title of the 1972 AFCON edition, Dengaki was one of eleven living players, surprised at the elimination of his team from qualifying the 2021 Africa Cup of Nations, publicly criticized the corruption and mismanagement of the Congolese Football Federation for the lack of investment in its players.

Dengaki died on 6 January 2025 following a long battle with illness at Brazzaville at the age of 72.
