= Jacques Yvon Ndolou =

Congolgese footballer, general and politician (born 1944)

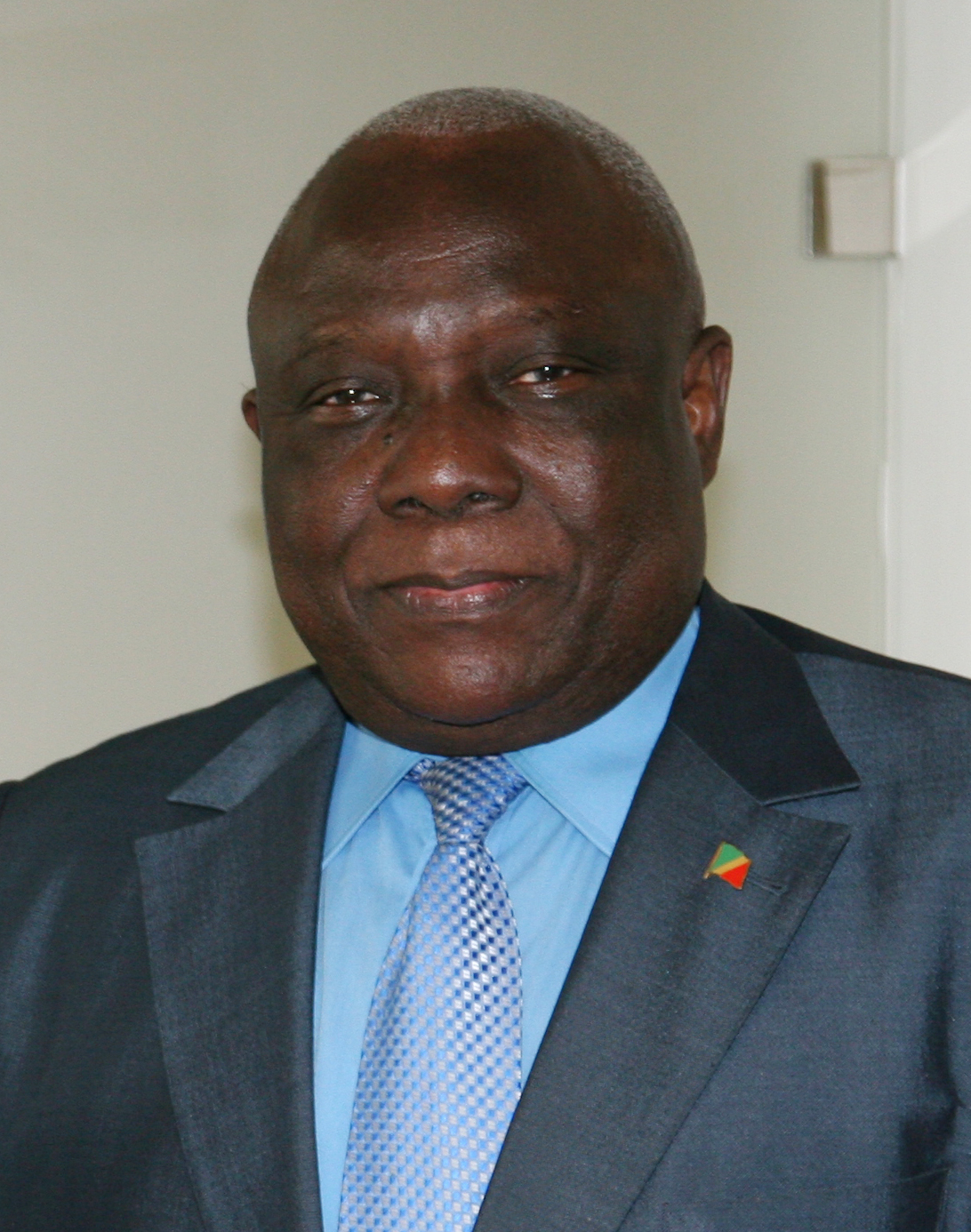
- Ndolou in 2014

Ambassador of the Congo to the Central African Republic
- Incumbent
- Assumed office 29 June 2017
- Preceded by: Gabriel Entcha-Ebia

Ambassador of the Congo to Germany
- In office 15 May 2012 – 29 June 2017
- Succeeded by: Mamadou Camara Dekamo

Minister of Sport
- In office 15 September 2009 – 17 August 2011
- President: Denis Sassou-Nguesso
- Preceded by: Serge Michel Odzoki
- Succeeded by: Léon-Alfred Opimbat

Minister of Defence
- In office 18 August 2002 – 15 September 2009
- President: Denis Sassou-Nguesso
- Prime Minister: Isidore Mvouba
- Preceded by: Justin Lékoundzou Itihi Ossetoumba
- Succeeded by: Charles Zacharie Bowao

Personal details
- Born: Jacques Yvon Ndolou; 3 May 1944 (age 82) Bohoulou, Congo, French Equatorial Africa
- Education: Frunze Military Academy
- Occupation: Footballer; Politician; General

Military service
- Allegiance: Congo
- Branch: Congolese Ground Forces
- Years of service: 1962–
- Rank: Général de division
Association football career
- Position: Defensive midfielder
Senior career*
Years	Team	Apps	(Gls)
- Abeilles
- Étoile du Congo
- Inter Brazzaville
International career
1969–1974	Congo–Brazzaville		
Medal record
Men's football
Representing Congo
African Games
Winner	1965 Brazzaville
Representing Congo
Africa Cup of Nations
Winner	1972 Cameroon
- * Club domestic league appearances and goals

Jacques Yvon Ndolou (born 3 May 1944) is a Congolese politician, general and retired footballer. Throughout his military career, he served as Chief of General Staff of the Congolese Armed Forces from 1999 to 2002. He currently serves as the Ambassador to the Central African Republic since 29 June 2017, previously serving as the Ambassador to Germany from 15 May 2012 to 29 June 2017.

== Early life ==
Jacques Yvon Ndolou was born on 3 May 1944 in Bohoulou, a village in the Mossaka District. He studied at the Frunze Military Academy in Moscow, where he obtained a master's degree in military science and a diploma in general staff and tactical-operational command. He also studied at the École spéciale militaire de Saint-Cyr in France during the 1970s.

== Military and Political career ==
Ndolou entered service on 22 June 1962. He was put at the head of Military Zone No. and participated in the creation of the Marien-Ngouabi Military Academy. In 1998, he was promoted to the rank of brigadier general by Denis Sassou-Nguesso. A year later, on 22 January 1999, he was appointed Chief of General Staff of the Congolese Armed Forces after Yves Motandeau-Monghot was involved in a coup d'état. He held this position until 20 December 2002, when he was replaced by Charles Richard Mondjo. On 1 October 2002, he was promoted to the rank of Major General. Later on, he was assigned to restore discipline in the Congolese Ground Forces following instances of inscipline and poor training within the ranks.

Ndolou held the position of Chief of Staff of the Minister of Defence from 1995 to 1999. He then became Minister Delegate to the Presidency of the Republic in charge of the National Defence (2002–2005), before becoming Minister at the Presidency of the same portfolio on 7 January 2005, a position he held until September 2009, when he was replaced by Charles Zacharie Bowao. During his tenure as Minister of Defence, he inaugurated the "Stele of the Dead" on 21 June 2006. He was then appointed Minister of Sports and Physical Education on 15 September 2009 in place of Serge Michel Odzoki, and held this position until 17 August 2011, when he was replaced by Léon-Alfred Opimbat.

He was then for a time deputy secretary general of the Congolese National Olympic and Sports Committee. On 15 May 2012, he was appointed ambassador of the Republic of Congo to Germany. Since 29 June 2017, he was appointed ambassador to the Central African Republic.

== Sports career ==
A versatile sportsman, he participated with his volleyball team in the first Coupe des Tropiques in 1962 held in Bangui where he won the silver medal. His volleyball career would continue into the first African Games in 1965 in Brazzaville, where he won gold with his team. He later began a footballing career as a defensive midfielder, playing for Abeilles, Étoile du Congo and Inter Brazzaville Ndolou also represented Congo internationally, he began playing in 1969 where he played against Pelé during a visit of Santos to Brazzaville in January that year. He later served as the captain of Les Diables Rouges for the 1972 African Cup of Nations where the team won their only title as of 2026.

== Personal life ==
Ndolou is married and the father of twelve children.
