= Julien Mette =

French football manager (born 1981)

Personal information
- Full name: Julien Mette
- Date of birth: 28 December 1981 (age 44)
- Place of birth: Saint-André-de-Cubzac, France

Team information
- Current team: Tusker F.C. (head coach)

Managerial career
- Years: Team
- 2016–2017: Tongo
- 2018–2019: AS Otohô
- 2019–2021: Djibouti
- 2022–2024: AS Otohô
- 2026–: Tusker F.C.

Julien Mette (born 28 December 1981) is a French football coach.

== Career ==
Mette was appointed manager of the Djibouti national team in March 2019, following spells with Congo Premier League clubs Tongo and AS Otohô. He became head coach of Rwanda Premier League team Rayon Sports, before joining Tusker in February 2026.
