= Nasreddine Nabi =

Tunisian football manager

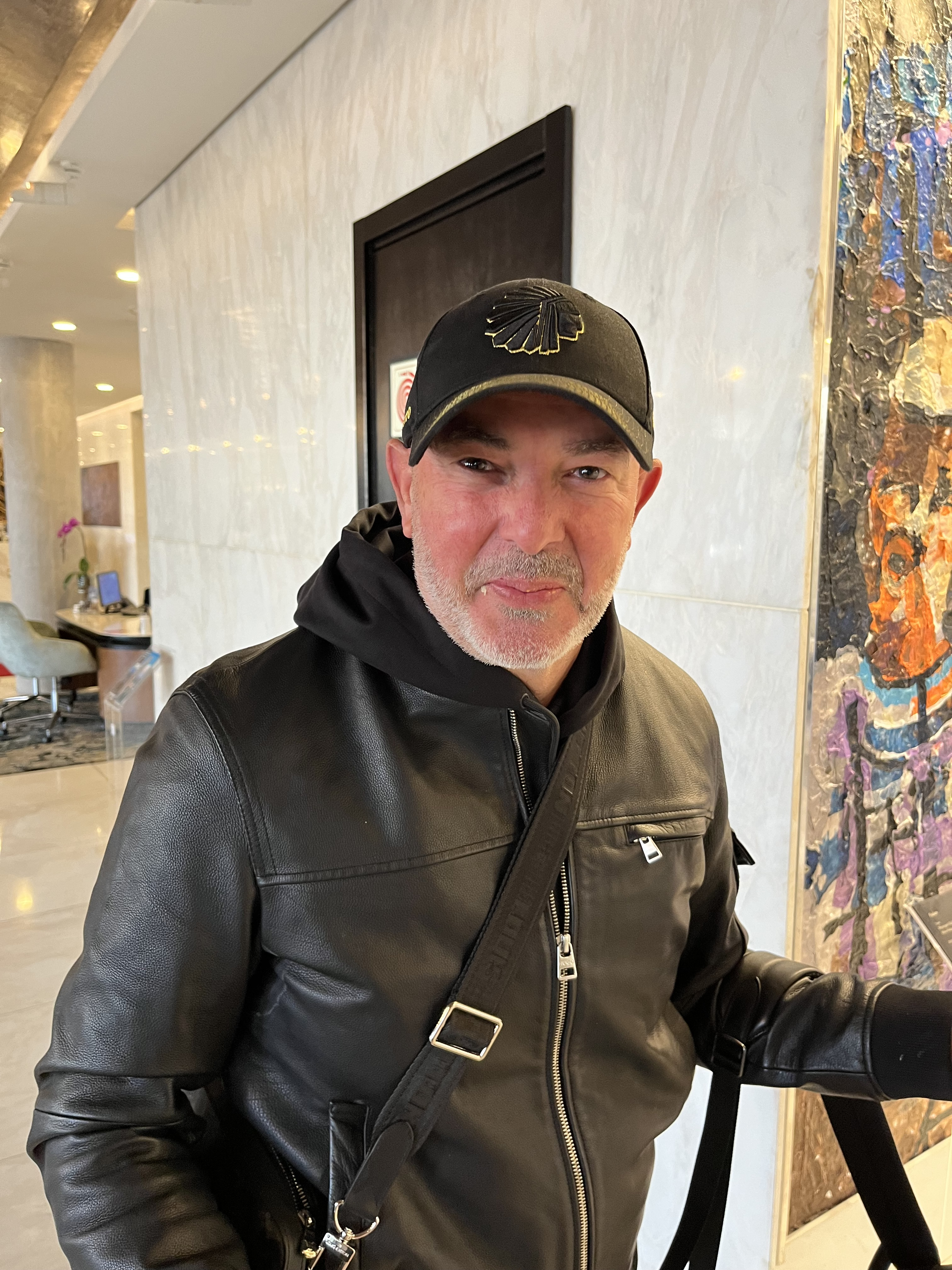
- Nabi in Sandton, Johannesburg in 2024

Personal information
- Full name: Mohamed Nasreddine Nabi
- Date of birth: 9 August 1965 (age 61)
- Place of birth: Monastir, Tunisia

Managerial career
- Years: Team
- 2001–2002: RSC Anderlecht (youth assistant)
- 2004: DC Motema Pembe
- 2011: DC Motema Pembe
- 2011–2013: AC Léopards
- 2013: Al-Ahly Benghazi
- 2013–2014: Al-Hilal
- 2015–2016: Ismaily
- 2017: AC Léopards
- 2019: PDHA
- 2021: Al-Merrikh
- 2021–2023: Young Africans
- 2023–2024: FAR Rabat
- 2024–2025: Kaizer Chiefs
- 2026: Raja CA
- 2026–: Wydad AC

Nasreddine Nabi (Arabic: نصر الدين نابي; born 9 August 1965) is a Tunisian professional football manager and former player who is the current manager of Botola club Raja CA.

== Managerial career ==
During the 2021–22 season, he signed a contract with the Tanzanian club Young Africans and led them to win the national championship twice and the Tanzania Cup, and to reach the first African final of their history, during the 2022–23 CAF Confederation Cup, which they lost against USM Alger.

During the 2023–24 season, the Moroccan AS FAR recruited him for two seasons. In July 2024, he became the head coach of South African side Kaizer Chiefs.

Chiefs, one of South Africa's largest and historically most successful clubs, struggled under Nabi, finishing ninth in the 2024–25 Premiership, but Nabi led Chiefs to their first trophy in a decade when they won the 2024–25 Nedbank Cup.

Nabi missed the start of his second season at Chiefs, returning to Tunisia after his wife suffered severe injuries in an accident. However, prior to the clubs opening tie in the 2025–26 CAF Confederation Cup, the club claimed that Nabi was ineligibile to sit on the bench due to his failure to do the required refresher coaching courses. Nabi denied this, but the relationship broke down. Nabi returned to Tunisia while a standoff ensued, with the contract eventually terminated in October 2025.

On 13 juin 2026, Raja CA announced the arrival of Nasreddine Nabi to replace Fadlu Davids. However, following sporting and transfer disagreements with the club's board, Raja CA officially terminated his contract by mutual agreement on August 31, 2026, before he could manage a competitive match in the new season. He was subsequently replaced by Paco Jémez.

== Honours ==
AC Léopards

- CAF Confederation Cup: 2012
- Congo Ligue 1:
- Coupe du Congo: 2017

Young Africans

- Tanzanian Premier League: 2021–22, 2022–23
- FAT Cup: 2021–22, 2022–23
- CAF Confederation Cup runner-up: 2022–23

FAR Rabat

- Botola runner-up: 2023–24
- Throne Cup runner-up: 2023–24

Kaizer Chiefs

- Nedbank Cup: 2024–25
