= AS Police =

AS Police (French: Association Sportive Police) is the name of a number of sports clubs based in French-speaking countries of Africa. It may refer to:

== Basketball ==
- AS Police (basketball, Mali) in Mali

== Football ==
- AS Police (Bamako) in Mali
- AS Police (Brazzaville) in the Republic of the Congo
- AS Police (Dakar) in Senegal; formerly known as ASC Police and ASF Police
- AS Police (Libreville) in Gabon
- AS Police (Niamey) in Niger
- AS Police (Ouagadougou) in Burkina Faso
- AS Police (Pointe-Noire) in the Republic of the Congo
- AS Police (Porto-Novo) in Benin
- ASC Police, Nouakchott, Mauritania, formerly known as AS Police

== See also ==
- Police FC (disambiguation)
