= Mopacho =

Congolese dance created in Brazzaville

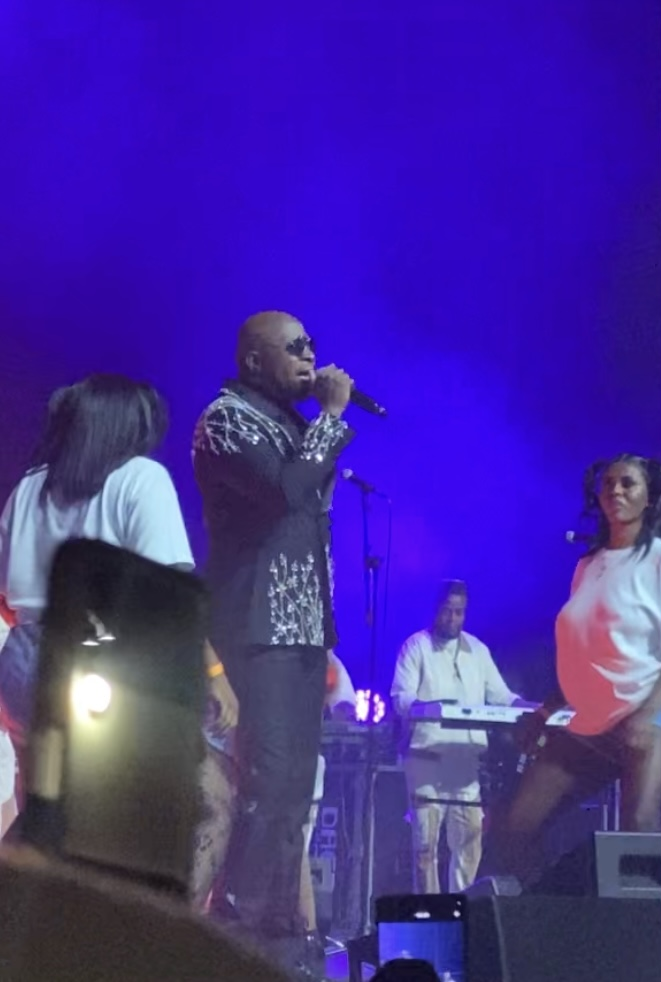
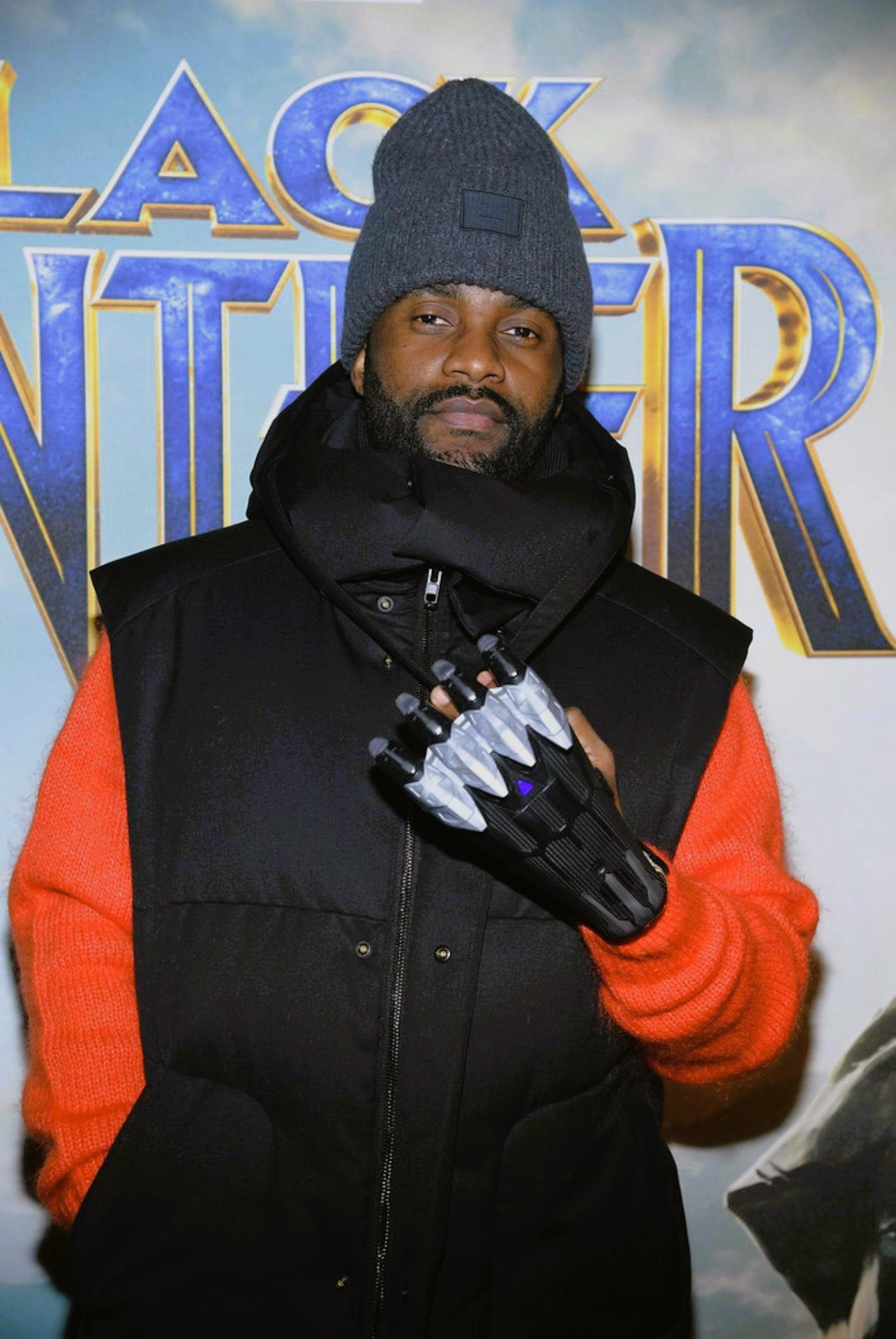
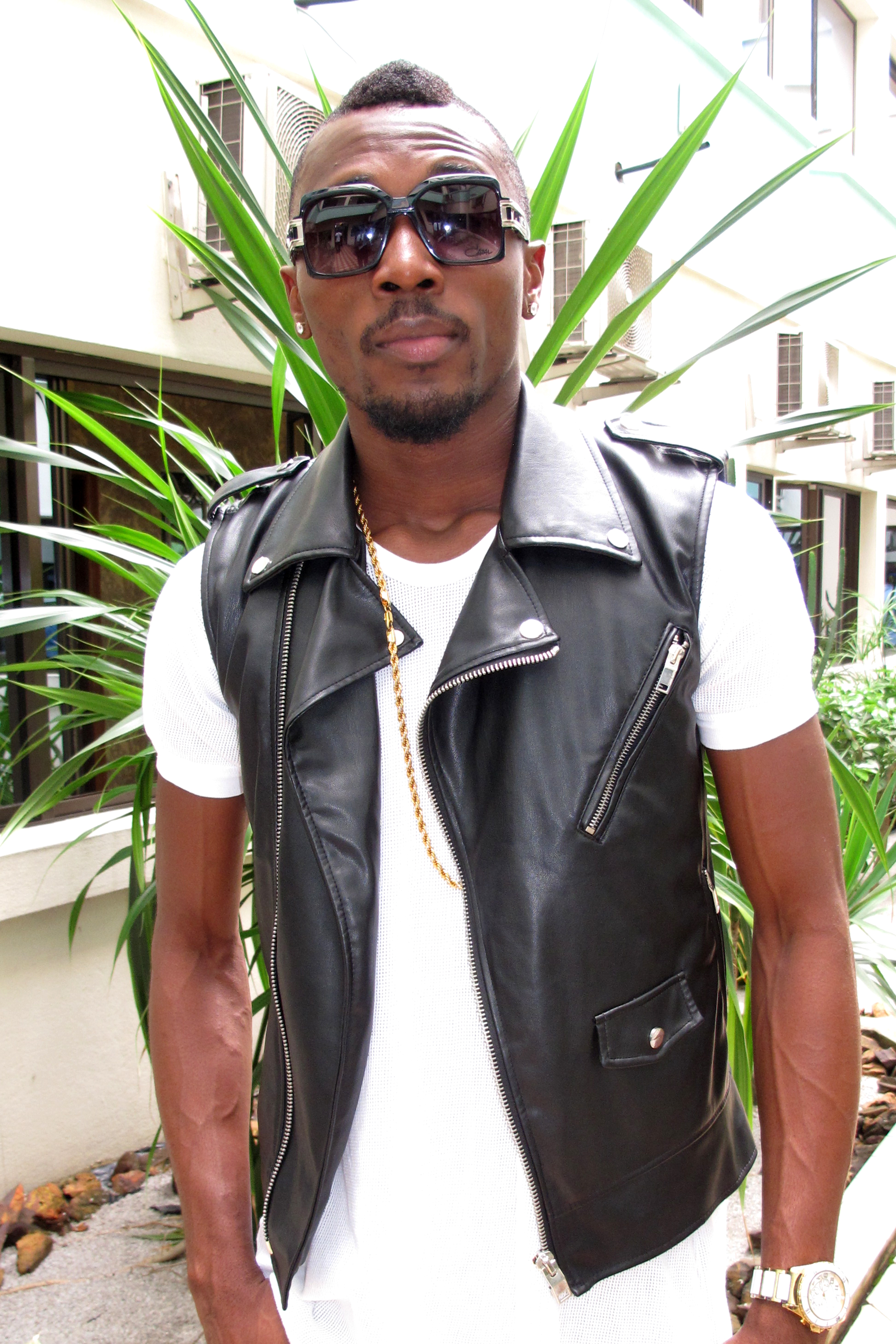
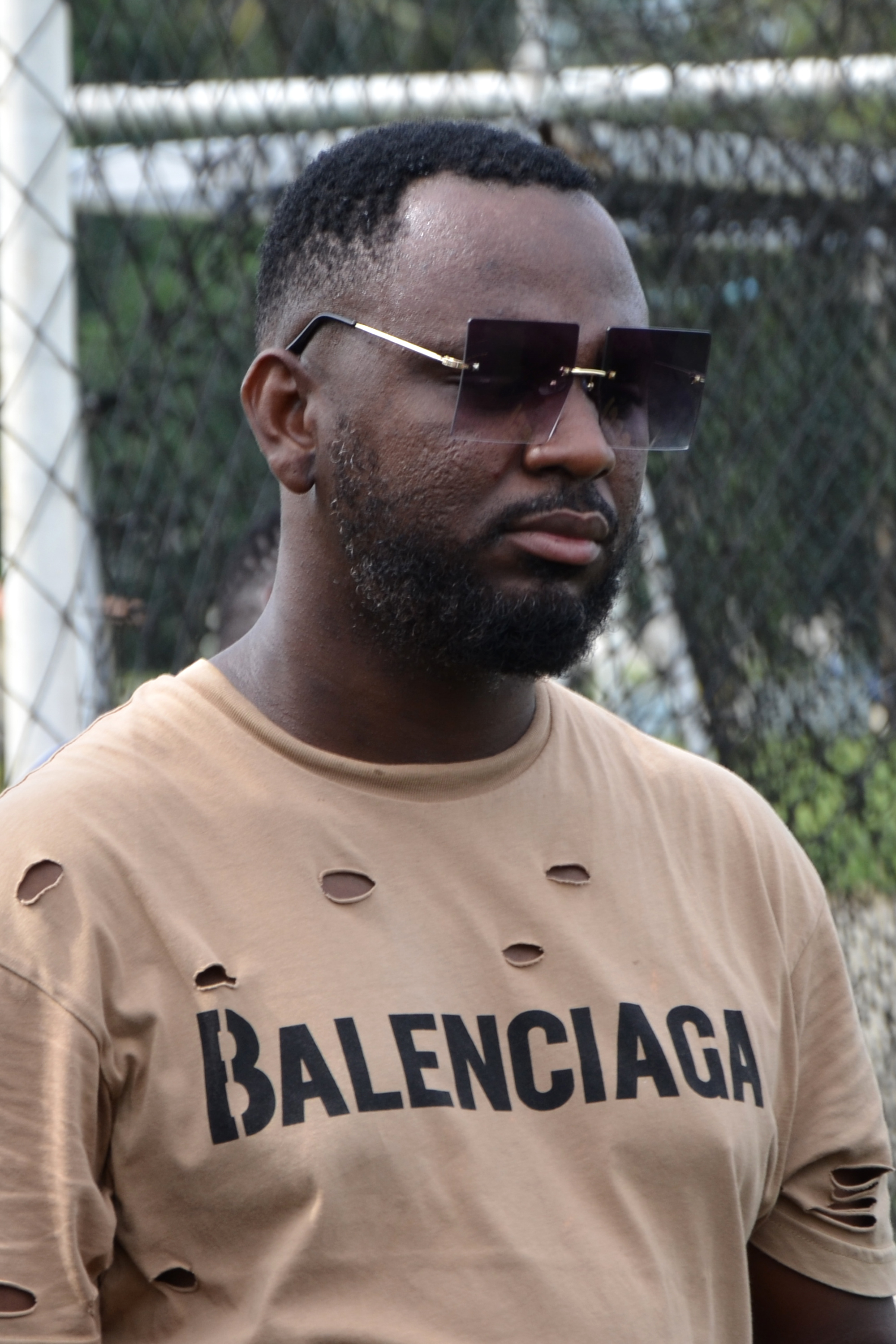
While the dance rose to widespread continental and international popularity through DJ Afara Tsena Fukuchima, it was also popularized by Roga Roga (left), Fally Ipupa (center left), Serge Beynaud (center right), and DJ Kedjevara (right).

Mopacho is a Congolese dance that emerged in Brazzaville in 1990, created by Sixte Singha, a native of Ouenzé, the city's 5th arrondissement. According to Agence d'Information d'Afrique Centrale, mopacho is "performed with full-body movements from head to toe. However, it varies in gesture from one department to another, with dancers influenced by the dance steps of their respective regions". The dance gained widespread popularity in the early 2020s among the youths on both sides of the Congo River, particularly in Brazzaville and Kinshasa, through social media platforms such as TikTok, where viral challenges turned it into a youth culture. Its mainstream breakthrough surfaced in 2022 with DJ Afara Tsena Fukuchima's hit "Afro Mbokalisation", which propelled the dance to continental attention and was later embraced by several prominent musicians, including Fally Ipupa, DJ Kedjevara, Gaz Mawete, and Serge Beynaud, who incorporated its movements into their music videos.

== Description ==
Mopacho dance engages every part of the body, from the head, neck, upper and lower limbs, torso, shoulders, back, hips, and pelvis. Performers typically synchronize their movements with the rhythm of Congolese instrumental music, though Ivorian tunes are occasionally used, and this versatility allows mopacho to adapt to virtually any musical beat. The choreography begins with alternating foot movements, advancing and retreating in time with the music. As the rhythm intensifies, the performer raises the shoulders, crosses the arms in an "X" formation, and keeps the hands open while executing gentle hip rotations and a gradual lowering of the pelvis. The head moves fluidly from side to side, integrating the upper and lower body into a single, continuous motion.

Originally conceived by Sixte Singha as a personal dance style, mopacho evolved during the early 2020s into a collective expression of Congolese urban creativity. Linguistically, the term mopacho is tripartite, composed of mo / pa / cho, derived from the lexemes mo (me), pa (step), and cho (show). Together, they form mopacho or mopashow, literally meaning "to be in control of one's steps to perform or to express oneself". Each component carries a specific meaning:

- mo: Refers to the personal pronoun me or the demonstrative my, with this personalization engaging the dancer's identity and responsibility in performance.
- pa: Denotes the small back-and-forth steps made with the lower limbs, which combine with the rest of the body to produce aesthetic harmony.
- cho: Implies the act of performing, putting on a show, and capturing the audience's attention through dance, while also representing the artistic spectacle created by the successful coordination of all body parts.

== History ==
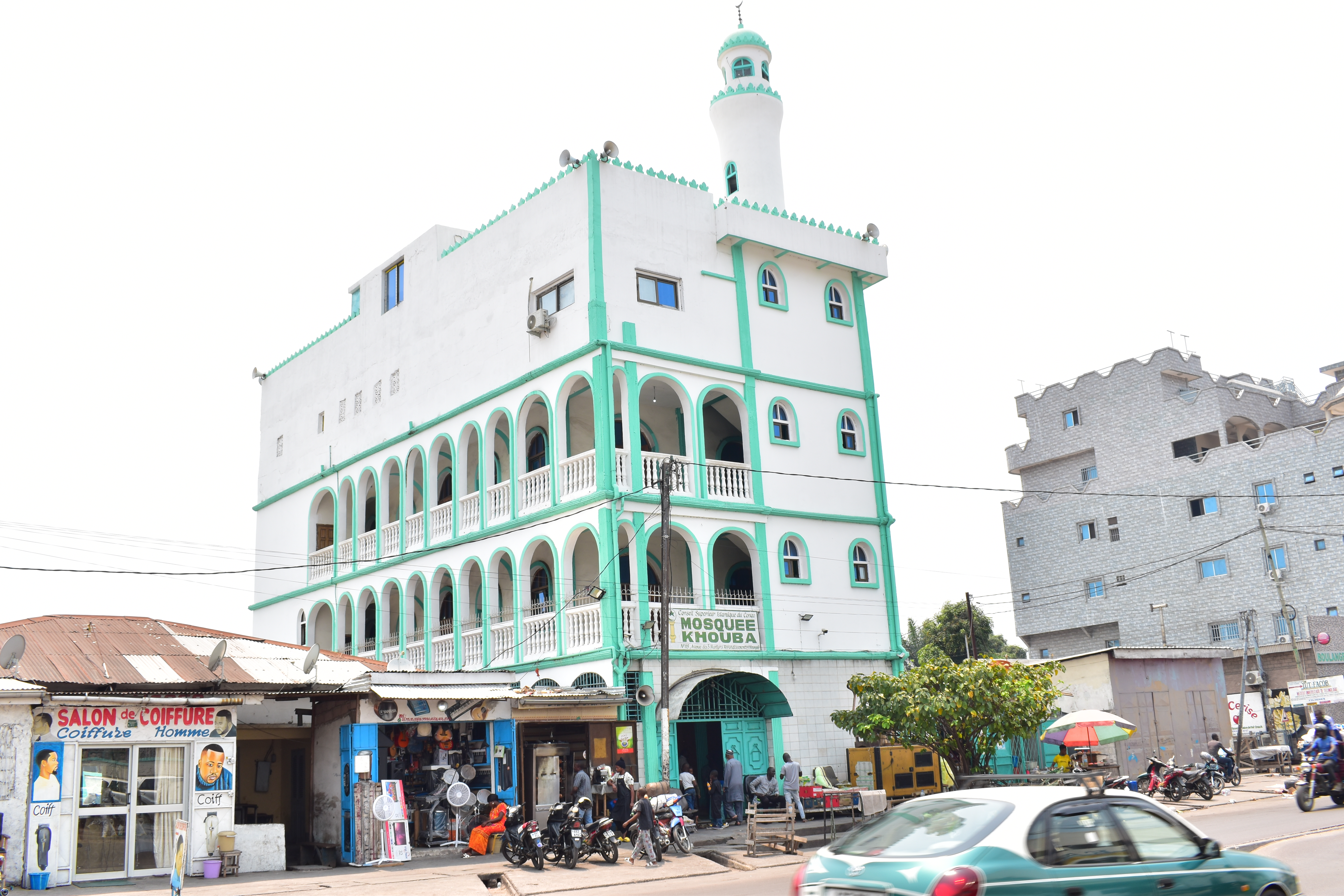
Ouenzé, the arrondissement where Mopacho originated.

The mopacho dance originated in 1990 in Ouenzé, the fifth arrondissement of Brazzaville, Republic of the Congo, and was created by Sixte Singha, also known by his other stage name Zgala Mboyo. Mopacho drew inspiration from the traditional dances of the Mbochi people, an ethnic group inhabiting Boundji in the northern Cuvette Department. In an interview broadcast on 7 January 2023, Singha explained that his motivation for creating mopacho was to offer "a dance for people who didn't know how to dance well". Over time, he founded the troupe Mopacho de Mopacho Mocho, which began performing regularly at festivals, cultural events, and ceremonies in Brazzaville. By the 2010s, mopacho had become a recognizable feature of youth culture in Ouenzé and neighboring arrondissements, where young people performed it to Congolese and Ivorian rhythms in nganda (bars), nightclubs, and even during funeral vigils.

DJ Afara Tsena Fukuchima performing at the 12th edition of the Festival Panafricain de Musique (FESPAM)

It experienced a moderate resurgence in 2021, expanding across all nine of Brazzaville's arrondissements, closely linked to the release of "Bokoko" by Roga Roga and Extra Musica on 24 September 2021, a track from their eponymous extended play (EP). In April 2022, the release of "Give Freedom" by Tidiane Mario sustained mopacho's momentum, and later that year, in December 2022, DJ Afara Tsena Fukuchima's hit "Afro Mbokalisation" propelled the dance to international recognition. The track fused elements of ndombolo, notably its sébène guitar-driven section, with coupé-décalé, characterized by piano and guitar riffs. Within a month, "Afro Mbokalisation" amassed over three million views online and inspired the "Mopacho Challenge" on TikTok, where users across the globe recreated the dance and showcased its intricate coordination and physical expressiveness. Through thousands of online videos, the dance came to symbolize what many described as a "sculpture in motion" (sculpture en mouvement), and this digital exposure boosted its global diffusion across Africa, Europe, the Americas, and Asia. Prominent African artists, including Fally Ipupa, Serge Beynaud, DJ Kedjevara, and Gaz Mawete, soon integrated mopacho into their music videos.

== National recognition and competition ==
In response to its growing global reach and "to reaffirm its Congolese origin", the Ministry of Cultural Industry, Tourism, Arts and Leisure of the Republic of the Congo organized a national dance competition titled "Mopacho Challenge National". The event took place in Brazzaville from 28 December 2022 to 7 January 2023, and brought together participants from across the country. It encompassed all twelve departments of the Republic of the Congo, with each department selecting a finalist to represent it in the national finals held in Brazzaville. During the event, the twelve competitors showcased their choreographic interpretation and technical "mastery of the mopacho" dance before an audience and a distinguished panel of judges composed of Olivier Brumou and Sixte Singha.

At the closing of the competition, the top three performers were awarded prizes for excellence, with first place going to Rechy Edoualiko Ngassaï, known as Ateka Molimo, a 22-year-old from the Cuvette Department, who received 800,000 CFA francs (approximately €1,200). Second place was awarded to Wizy Okemba of Brazzaville, who earned 600,000 CFA francs (about €1,000), while third place went to Lurda Mienanzambi from Pointe-Noire, with a prize of 500,000 CFA francs (around €850). A special encouragement award of 1,000,000 CFA francs was distributed among the remaining nine contestants.
