= 2018 Coupe du Congo (Republic of Congo) =

Tournament details
- Country: Republic of the Congo

Final positions
- Champions: CSMD Diables Noirs

The 2018 Coupe du Congo is the 34th edition of the Coupe du Congo, the knockout football competition of the Republic of the Congo.

== Round 1 ==
[May 25]

FC Emmanuel 5-0 Ajax de Ouenzé

Lion Poto Poto awd AS Nsiemba [awarded 0-3]

[May 26]

AS Penarol 5-2 FC Flamengo

Mbila Sport 4-1 Etoile Talas

CFF Futur Champion 1-3 BNG

CMBF awd Aigle Sport [awarded 3-0]

US Bantou 0-1 Interclub Pointe-Noire

[May 27]

FC Racine awd Real Impact [awarded 3-0]

Olympic Club Brazzaville awd TP Mystère [awarded 3-0]

EF Total 0-0 ASK Pointe-Noire [5-4 pen]

FC Tchimani awd Pigeon Vert [awarded 3-0]

Lion Blessé 0-2 Jeunes Fauves

Asia Sport 0-1 Interclub Dolisie

JS Mouyondzi 1-2 FC Corneil

FC Mboukoudou awd FC Mouyengué [awarded 3-0]

Patronage Sibiti awd Carpillon Sibiti [awarded 3-0]

CO Harleme 1-0 AS Kimbonguela

FC Ignié 0-0 AS Elbo [3-4 pen]

ATP awd Etoile Djambala [awarded 3-0]

Patronage Djambala awd CARA Djambala [awarded 0-3]

Caiman Mossaka n/p Etoile Mossaka [both teams forfeited]

AS Oka 2-3 Ayandza Sport

St.-Michel Ouesso drw CARA Ouesso [5-4 pen]

Diables Noirs Ouesso 0-7 FC Biala

Etoile Impfondo awd Etoile Ouesso [awarded 3-0]

[May 28]

Racine Club Olympique 1-3 RCB

Red Star 0-2 Yaba Sport

FC Nathalys 0-0 TP Mokanda [14-13 pen]

[May 29]

US Djeno - Fleur du Ciel [apparently not played]

TP Caiman - FC Pélérin [apparently not played]

[May 30]

CRCI - Club des Jeunes [apparently not played]

AS Vaudou n/p Munisport [both clubs to next round]

== Round 2 ==
[Jun 9]

Tongo FC 1-2 BNG

FC Racine 0-2 Etoile du Congo

Munisport 1-1 AS Cheminots [1-3 pen]

FC Tchimani 0-6 La Mancha

[Jun 10]

Ayandza Sport 1-3 CARA Brazzaville

AS Elbo 0-4 Diables Noirs

AS Vaudou 1-0 Nico-Nicoye

Interclub Pointe-Noire 1-0 AS Vita Club Mokanda

Jeunes Fauves 1-2 Interclub Brazzaville

AC Léopards 2-0 Interclub Dolisie

FC Corneil 3-1 JS Poto Poto

FC Biala 0-0 JS Talangai [0-3 pen]

St.-Michel Ouesso 1-7 AS Otôho

Yaba Sport 1-1 St.-Michel de Ouenzé [1-3 pen]

CARA Djambala awd Patronage Ste.-Anne [awarded 3-0]

[Jun 11]

RCB 3-2 FC Kondzo

== Round 3 ==
[Jun 23]

St.-Michel de Ouenzé 0-1 Interclub Brazzaville

Etoile du Congo 2-1 BNG

[Jun 24]

Diables Noirs 5-0 RCB

AS Cheminots 1-0 Interclub Pointe-Noire

La Mancha 5-0 AS Vaudou

AC Léopards 1-0 FC Corneil

AS Otôho 4-1 CARA Djambala

CARA Brazzaville 1-0 JS Talangai

== Quarterfinals ==
First Legs [Jul 8]

AS Cheminots 0-0 Diables Noirs

CARA Brazzaville 0-0 AC Léopards

AS Otôho 3-1 Interclub Brazzaville

La Mancha 2-1 Etoile du Congo

Second Legs

[Jul 12]

AC Léopards 2-0 CARA Brazzaville

[Jul 14]

Interclub Brazzaville 0-3 AS Otôho

[Jul 15]

Etoile du Congo 2-2 La Mancha

Diables Noirs 2-1 AS Cheminots

== Semifinals ==
First Legs [Jul 26]

Diables Noirs 1-0 AC Léopards

La Mancha 4-2 AS Otôho

Second Legs [Aug 5]

AS Otôho awd La Mancha [awarded 3-0; abandoned at 2-0 on 26', La Mancha walked off after they had had two penalties awarded against them]

AC Léopards 2-4 Diables Noirs

== Final ==
[Aug 13, Brazzaville]

Diables Noirs 0-0 AS Otôho [5-3 pen]

== See also ==
- 2018 Ligue 1
