= Coupe du Congo =

Coupe du Congo may refer to:

- Coupe du Congo (DR Congo), knockout cup football competition of the Democratic Republic of the Congo
- Coupe du Congo (Republic of Congo), knockout cup football competition of the Republic of the Congo
