= 2002 African Cup Winners' Cup =

Tournament details
- Dates: 2 February – 8 December 2002
- Teams: 37 (from 1 confederation)

Final positions
- Champions: (Morocco) Wydad AC (1st title)
- Runners-up: (Ghana) Asante Kotoko

Tournament statistics
- Matches played: 68
- Goals scored: 193 (2.84 per match)
- Top scorer: (Ghana) Michael Osei (7)

The 2002 African Cup Winners' Cup football club tournament was won by Wydad AC in two-legged final victory against Asante Kotoko This was the twenty-eighth season that the tournament took place for the winners of each African country's domestic cup. Thirty-seven sides entered the competition. Three teams were disqualified for not showing up during the different stages of the competition, starting with Togolese side Sara Sport who failed to arrive for the 1st leg of the preliminary round, then South Africans Kaizer Chiefs who failed to arrive for the 2nd leg of the first round and finally the Réunion representative Jeanne d'Arc who failed to show up for their 2nd leg match of the second round.
The last two teams both failed to show up for their 2nd leg match against the Malagasy side US Transfoot.

== Preliminary round ==
| Team 1 | Agg. | Team 2 | 1st leg | 2nd leg |
|---|---|---|---|---|
| Akokana FC (Niger) | 1–3 | (Chad) Gazelle FC | 0–0 | 1–3 |
| Atlético Malabo (Equatorial Guinea) | w/o^{1} | (Togo) Sara Sport | — | — |
| Les Citadins FC (Rwanda) | 6–3 | (Central African Republic) Stade Centrafricain | 4–0 | 2–3 |
| Polisi SC (Tanzania) | 2–1 | (Ethiopia) Guna Trading FC | 0–0 | 2–1 |
| US Beau-Bassin Rose-Hill (Mauritius) | 4–3 | (Botswana) Extension Gunners | 3–2 | 1–1 |

Notes
^{1} Sara Sport failed to arrive for 1st leg.

== First round ==
| Team 1 | Agg. | Team 2 | 1st leg | 2nd leg |
|---|---|---|---|---|
| Gazelle FC (Chad) | 1–6 | (Algeria) USM Alger | 0–0 | 1–6 |
| AS Kaloum Star (Guinea) | 3–7 | (Gabon) AS Mangasport | 2–2 | 1–5 |
| Express FC (Uganda) | 3–3 (1–4 p) | (Egypt) Ghazl El Mahalla | 2–1 | 1–2 |
| Atlético Malabo (Equatorial Guinea) | 2–5 | (Libya) Al-Ahli | 2–2 | 0–3 |
| ASC SONACOS (Senegal) | 0–3 | (Morocco) Wydad AC | 0–0 | 0–3 |
| Mamahira AC (Mali) | 0–6 | (Ivory Coast) Alliance Bouaké | 0–4 | 0–2 |
| Les Citadins FC (Rwanda) | 1–4 | (Cameroon) Fovu Club | 1–3 | 0–1 |
| Dolphins FC (Nigeria) | 1–2 | (Republic of the Congo) AS Police | 1–0 | 0–2 |
| Polisi SC (Tanzania) | 0–9 | (Tunisia) CS Hammam-Lif | 0–2 | 0–7 |
| AFC Leopards (Kenya) | 0–1 | (Sudan) Al-Mourada SC | 0–1 | 0–0 |
| Kaizer Chiefs (South Africa) | dq^{1} | (Madagascar) US Transfoot | 4–0 | — |
| US Beau-Bassin Rose-Hill (Mauritius) | 0–1 | (Réunion) SS Jeanne d'Arc | 0–1 | 0–0 |
| Asante Kotoko (Ghana) | 4–2 | (Angola) Sonangol do Namibe | 2–0 | 2–2 |
| CD Maxaquene (Mozambique) | 3–3 (a) | (South Africa) Santos FC | 3–1 | 0–2 |
| Zanaco FC (Zambia) | 4–4 (a)^{2} | (Democratic Republic of the Congo) AS Vita Club | 4–1 | 0–3 |
| Shabanie Mine (Zimbabwe) | 1–3 | (Seychelles) St Michel United | 1–0 | 0–3 |

Notes
^{1} Kaizer Chiefs did not arrive for 2nd leg in Tamatave, claiming transport problems, and were disqualified.
^{2} AS Vita Club arrived late for 1st leg scheduled for Mar 9, claiming not to have been aware it was not on Mar 10; CAF rescheduled the tie for Mar 30 and Apr 14, ruling both parties were to blame for insufficient communication.

== Second round ==
| Team 1 | Agg. | Team 2 | 1st leg | 2nd leg |
|---|---|---|---|---|
| AS Mangasport (Gabon) | 1–3 | (Algeria) USM Alger | 1–2 | 0–1 |
| Al-Ahli (Libya) | 2–3 | (Egypt) Ghazl El Mahalla | 2–1 | 0–2 |
| Alliance Bouaké (Ivory Coast) | 1–6 | (Morocco) Wydad AC | 1–1 | 0–5 |
| AS Police (Republic of the Congo) | 0–0 (4–3 p) | (Cameroon) Fovu Club | 0–0 | 0–0 |
| Al-Mourada SC (Sudan) | 3–0 | (Tunisia) CS Hammam-Lif | 2–0 | 1–0 |
| SS Jeanne d'Arc (Réunion) | dq^{1} | (Madagascar) US Transfoot | 3–1 | — |
| Santos FC (South Africa) | 4–4 (a) | (Ghana) Asante Kotoko | 3–3 | 1–1 |
| St Michel United (Seychelles) | 1–3 | (Democratic Republic of the Congo) AS Vita Club | 0–1 | 1–2 |

Notes
^{1} SS Jeanne d'Arc did not show for 2nd leg and were disqualified.

== Quarter-finals ==
| Team 1 | Agg. | Team 2 | 1st leg | 2nd leg |
|---|---|---|---|---|
| Al-Mourada SC (Sudan) | 0–4 | (Republic of the Congo) AS Police | 0–1 | 0–3 |
| Asante Kotoko (Ghana) | 5–4 | (Egypt) Ghazl El Mahalla | 3–0 | 2–4 |
| AS Vita Club (Democratic Republic of the Congo) | 2–3 | (Morocco) Wydad AC | 1–0 | 1–3 |
| US Transfoot (Madagascar) | 3–11 | (Algeria) USM Alger | 1–3 | 2–8 |

== Semi-finals ==
| Team 1 | Agg. | Team 2 | 1st leg | 2nd leg |
|---|---|---|---|---|
| Asante Kotoko (Ghana) | 7–2 | (Republic of the Congo) AS Police | 4–0 | 3–2 |
| Wydad AC (Morocco) | 2–2 (a) | (Algeria) USM Alger | 0–0 | 2–2 |

== Final ==
16 November 2002

| Wydad AC (Morocco) | 1–0 | (Ghana) Asante Kotoko |
|---|---|---|
| Madihi 50' |

Stade Mohammed V, Casablanca
Attendance: 35,000
Referee: Evehe Divine (Cameroon)
8 December 2002

| Asante Kotoko (Ghana) | 2–1 | (Morocco) Wydad AC |
|---|---|---|
| Ansah 54'; Osei 86' | | Talha 73' |

Kumasi Stadium, Kumasi
Attendance: 60,000
Referee: Gamal Al-Ghandour (Egypt)

Wydad Casablanca won on away goals (2–2 on aggregate).

== Champion ==
2002 African Cup winner's cup Winners
(Morocco)
Wydad
first title
