= Club 57 =

Club 57 may refer to:

- Club 57 (TV series), a Rainbow/Nickelodeon television program
- Club 57 (nightclub), a defunct nightclub in New York City that closed around 1983
- Club 57 Tourbillon, a Congolese football club
