= Military ranks of Republic of the Congo =

The military ranks of the Republic of the Congo are the military insignia used by the Armed Forces of the Republic of the Congo. Being a former colony of France, the Republic of the Congo shares a rank structure similar to that of France.

== Commissioned officer ranks ==
The rank insignia of commissioned officers.

Rank group	General / flag officers				Senior officers			Junior officers
Congolese Ground Forces
Congolese Ground Forces	Général d'armée	Général de corps	Général de division	Général de brigade	Colonel	Lieutenant-Colonel	Commandant	Capitaine	Lieutenant	Sous-lieutenant
Congolese Navy
Congolese Navy	Amiral	Vice-amiral d'escadre	Vice-amiral	Contre-amiral	Capitaine de vaisseau	Capitaine de frégate	Capitaine de corvette	Lieutenant de vaisseau	Enseigne de vaisseau de 1^{re} classe	Enseigne de vaisseau de 2^{e} classe
Congolese Air Force
Congolese Air Force	Général d'armée	Général de corps	Général de division	Général de brigade	Colonel	Lieutenant-Colonel	Commandant	Capitaine	Lieutenant	Sous-lieutenant
Congolese Gendarmerie
Congolese Gendarmerie	Général d'armée	Général de corps	Général de division	Général de brigade	Colonel	Lieutenant-Colonel	Commandant	Capitaine	Lieutenant	Sous-lieutenant
Rank group	General / flag officers				Senior officers			Junior officers

=== Student officer ranks ===
Rank group	Student officer
Congolese Ground Forces
Congolese Ground Forces	Aspirant
Congolese Navy
Congolese Navy	Aspirant
Congolese Air Force
Congolese Air Force	Aspirant

== Other ranks ==
The rank insignia of non-commissioned officers and enlisted personnel.

Rank group	Senior NCOs				Junior NCOs		Enlisted
Congolese Ground Forces								No insignia
Congolese Ground Forces	Adjudant-chef	Adjudant	Sergent-chef	Sergent	Caporal-chef	Caporal	Soldat 1^{ère} classe	Soldat 2^{e} classe
Congolese Navy								No insignia
Congolese Navy	Maitre-principal	Premier maitre	Maitre	Second maitre	Quartier-maitre de 1^{ère} classe	Quartier-maitre de 2^{ème} classe	Matelot de 1^{ère} classe	Matelot de 2^{ème} classe
Congolese Air Force								No insignia
Congolese Air Force	Adjudant-chef	Adjudant	Sergent-chef	Sergent	Caporal-chef	Caporal	Soldat 1^{ère} classe	Soldat 2^{e} classe
Congolese Gendarmerie								No insignia
Congolese Gendarmerie	Adjudant-chef	Adjudant	Maréchal des logis-chef	Maréchal des logis				Èleve gendarme
Rank group	Senior NCOs				Junior NCOs		Enlisted
