= US Saint Pierre =

Congo football club

US Saint-Pierre
- Full name: US Saint-Pierre
- Ground: Stade Municipal de Pointe-Noire; Pointe-Noire, Republic of the Congo
- Capacity: 13,500
- League: Congo Premier League

US Saint-Pierre is a Congolese football club based in Republic of the Congo. They play in the Congo Premier League.
