= Sidoine =

Sidoine is a given name. Notable people with the name include:

- Sidoine Beaullia (born 1983), Congolese footballer
- Sidoine Benoît, 14th century Benedictine monk, credited for inventing the traditional Normandy, France dish Tripes à la mode de Caen
- Sidoine Oussou (born 1992), Beninese footballer
