= Ouenzé =

Ouenzé is one of the arrondissements of Brazzaville, capital of Republic of Congo. It is located in the north of the capital. Brazzaville is divided into seven arrondissements, or districts: Makélékélé (1), Bacongo (2), Poto-Poto (3), Moungali (4), Ouenzé (5), Talangaï (6) and Mfilou (7). The population is about 1000 residents. Most of residents are educated. They speak French, Lingala and Kituba.

There are many sports like judo, karate etc. Most of them are called "Pomba" especially in an area called Texaco-city is the famous place. But the main common sport is football because it had five of the best clubs in Brazzaville: "Saint Michel de Ouenzé"; "AS Police (Brazzaville)"; "Ajax de Ouenzé"; "CARA Brazzaville" and "As Mbako".
