= Armed Forces of the Republic of the Congo =

Military forces of the Republic of the Congo

- Forces Armées de la République du Congo (French)
- Founded: 15 August 1960
- Current form: 16 January 1961
- Service branches: Army; Air Force; Navy; Gendarmerie
- Headquarters: Brazzaville

Leadership
- President of the Republic of the Congo: Denis Sassou Nguesso
- Minister of National Defense: Charles Richard Mondjo
- Chief of General Staff: Guy Blanchard Okoï

Personnel
- Military age: 20
- Active personnel: 10,000 (2014)

Expenditure
- Budget: $705 million (2015)
- Percent of GDP: 8.4 (2015)

Industry
- Foreign suppliers: France; South Africa; South Africa (historical); United States; United Kingdom; China; Russia; Soviet Union (historical); Spain; Italy; Israel (historical); Belgium

Related articles
- Ranks: Military ranks of Republic of the Congo

The Armed Forces of the Republic of the Congo (French: Forces armées de la République du Congo), also less formally denoted as the Forces armées congolaises or its acronym FAC, are the military forces of the Republic of the Congo. They consist of the Congolese Army, the Congolese Air Force, the Congolese Navy, and the Congolese National Gendarmerie. The dissolution of French Equatorial Africa in 1958, and France's impending military withdrawal from the Congo in August 1960, provided the impetus for the formation of the FAC. The FAC and state paramilitary agencies are headed by an Armed Forces Chief of General Staff, usually appointed by the President of the Republic of the Congo. Major General Guy Blanchard Okoï has served as chief of staff since 2012.

== History ==
The Congolese military was created on January 16, 1961, and reflected the nature of the colonial security forces, which recruited among the country's northern ethnic groups and were staffed by junior Bakongo officers and a handful of French senior commissioned officers. President Alphonse Massamba-Débat, who seized power in 1963, expelled all the French personnel and sidelined the military in favor of independent political militias, which were trained by Cuban troops. The militias and the Congo's civil defense corps were later integrated with the FAC as the Armée Nationale Populaire.

Under the People's Republic of the Congo, the FAC was again reorganized, with Mbochi career soldiers making up the bulk of the new officer corps; its effectiveness and standards, however, were gradually eroded by draconian political purges throughout the 1970s. A second major setback occurred during the 1990s, when mass desertions led to many FAC officers and enlisted troops joining regional militias. The FAC was reformed for the third time after the Second Congo War, incorporating many former rebels and militia combatants.

On 5 February 2012, there were munitions explosions at a tank regiment (seemingly 'Regiment Blinde') barracks located in Brazzaville's fifth arrondissement, Ouenzé. Some 206 people were initially reported killed. There are five military barracks in the city, and after the explosion officials said the government had promised to move all munitions out of the capital.

== Organization ==
The army Is composed of: the 10th Pointe Noir Infantry Brigade in Military Defense Zone No. 1

Which contains: the - Command and Services Battalion - Combat Engineering Company - 101° Motorized Infantry Battalion - 102° Airborne Battalion -104° Light Tank Battalion -106° Jet Artillery Group -108° Air Sol Artillery Group

== Army equipment ==
=== Small arms ===
Name	Image	Caliber	Type	Origin	Notes
Pistols
TT-33		7.62×25mm	Semi-automatic pistol	Soviet Union	
Walther PP		.25 ACP	Semi-automatic pistol	Germany	
MAC 50		9×19mm	Semi-automatic pistol	France	
Submachine guns
MAT-49		9×19mm	Submachine gun	France	
Franchi LF-57		9×19mm	Submachine gun	Italy	
Rifles
SKS		7.62×39mm	Semi-automatic rifle	Soviet Union	
AK		7.62×39mm	Assault rifle	Soviet Union	
AKM		7.62×39mm	Assault rifle	Soviet Union	
Type 56		7.62×39mm	Assault rifle	China	
IMI Galil		5.56×45mm	Assault rifle	Israel	
Vektor R4		5.56×45mm	Assault rifle	South Africa	
FN FAL		7.62×51mm	Battle rifle	Belgium	
CETME Model C		7.62×51mm	Battle rifle	Spain	
MAS-36		7.5×54mm	Bolt-action rifle	France	
MAS-49/56		7.5×54mm	Semi-automatic rifle	France	
Machine guns
FM 24/29		7.5×54mm	Light machine gun	France	
RP-46		7.62×54mmR	Light machine gun	Soviet Union	
RPD		7.62×39mm	Squad automatic weapon	Soviet Union	
RPK		7.62×39mm	Squad automatic weapon	Soviet Union	
PKM		7.62×54mmR	General-purpose machine gun	Soviet Union	
KPV		14.5×114mm	Heavy machine gun	Soviet Union	
DShK		12.7×108mm	Heavy machine gun	Soviet Union	
Rocket propelled grenade launchers
RPG-7		40mm	Rocket-propelled grenade	Soviet Union	
RPG-18		64mm	Rocket-propelled grenade	Soviet Union	
RPO-A Shmel		93mm	Missile launcher	Soviet Union	

=== Anti-tank weapons ===
Name	Image	Type	Origin	Caliber	Notes
M18		Recoilless rifle	United States	57mm	

=== Tanks ===
Name	Image	Type	Origin	Quantity	Notes
T-54/55		Medium tank	Soviet Union	25	
Type 59		Main battle tank	China	15	
Type 62		Light tank	China	10	
Type 63		Light tank	China	8	
PT-76		Amphibious Light tank	Soviet Union	3	

=== Scout cars ===
Name	Image	Type	Origin	Quantity	Notes
BRDM-1		Scout car	Soviet Union	25	
BRDM-2		Scout car	Soviet Union	25	

=== Armored personnel carriers ===
Name	Image	Type	Origin	Quantity	Notes
BTR-60		Amphibious Armored personnel carrier	Soviet Union	30	
AT105 Saxon		Armored personnel carrier	United Kingdom	28	
Panhard M3		Armoured personnel carrier	France	9	
Mamba		Armoured personnel carrier	South Africa	18	
Marauder		Armored personnel carrier	South Africa	52	
ZFB-05		Armored personnel carrier	China	14	

=== Artillery ===
Name	Image	Type	Origin	Quantity	Notes
Self-propelled artillery
2S1 Gvozdika		Self-propelled artillery	Soviet Union	3	
Rocket artillery
RPU-14		Multiple rocket launcher	Soviet Union	Unknown	
BM-14		Multiple rocket launcher	Soviet Union	Unknown	
BM-21 Grad		Multiple rocket launcher	Soviet Union	10	
Mortars
PM-41		Mortar	Soviet Union	Unknown	
PM-43		Mortar	Soviet Union	28	
Field artillery
ZiS-2		Anti-tank gun	Soviet Union	5	
BS-3		Field gun	Soviet Union	10	
D-30		Howitzer	Soviet Union	10	
D-20		Howitzer	Soviet Union	8	
M-46		Field gun	Soviet Union	5	

=== Air defence systems ===
==== Towed anti-aircraft guns ====
Name	Image	Type	Origin	Quantity	Notes
ZPU		Anti-aircraft gun	Soviet Union	Unknown	
61-K		Autocannon	Soviet Union	28	
S-60		Autocannon	Soviet Union	Unknown	
KS-19		Anti-aircraft gun	Soviet Union	4	

==== Self-propelled anti-aircraft guns ====
Name	Image	Type	Origin	Quantity	Notes
ZSU-23-4 Shilka		SPAAG	Soviet Union	8	

== Navy ==
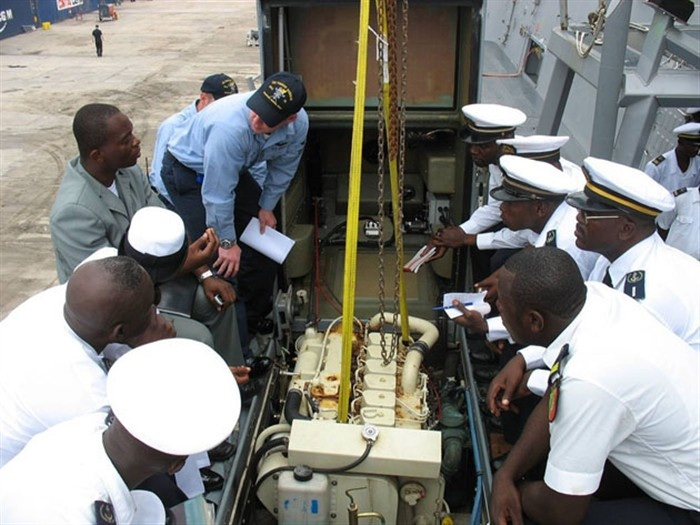
Congolese sailors aboard the USS Forrest Sherman.

The Navy has around 800 personnel. In October 2007, the US Navy provided some training to Congolese Navy personnel in Pointe-Noire, a port city that is the second largest settlement in the country.

As of 2016 it was commanded by Rear Admiral Andre Bouagnabea-Moundanza.

As of 2019 the Navy operates a single Mil Mi-14 helicopter.

== Air Force ==
Roundel of the Congolese Air Force

After achieving independence from France in 1960, the Congolese Air Force (Force Aerienne Congolaise) was started with equipment such as the Douglas C-47s, Broussards and Bell 47Gs, these were followed by Nord Noratlas tactical transports and Sud Alouette helicopter. In the 1970s the air force switched to Soviet equipment. This included five Ilyushin IL-14 and six turboprop Antonov An-24 transports and an An-26 in return for providing bases for Cuban MiG-17 operations over Angola. These fighters and a few MiG-15UTI combat trainers were transferred to the FAC. In 1990 these fighter were replaced by 16 USSR supplied MiG-21MF/bis Fishbeds plus a couple of MiG-21US trainers. Together with a Soviet training mission which stayed until late 1991, during that time there were numerous accidents that involved both Soviet and Congolese personnel. After the Soviets left there was only limited funding for MiG operations and they were withdrawn. Six Mi-8 helicopters were delivered from Ukraine in mid-1997 before the Cobra rebel takeover.

In 1990, the Air Force was reformed into its present state. Most fighter aircraft it possessed were scrapped in 2001. France and China provided most training to the Air Force in recent times.

See the article Congolese Air Force for current inventory.
