= Police FC =

Police Football Club, Police FC or Police F.C. can refer to:

- Al-Shorta SC, Iraq
- Ansan Police FC, South Korea
- Ho Chi Minh City Police F.C., Vietnam
- Home United FC, Singapore
- Konkola Mine Police F.C., Chililabombwe, Zambia
- Metropolitan Police F.C., Surrey, England
- NYPD FC, New York City, United States
- Police A.F.C., Isle of Man
- Police F.C. (Guyana)
- Police F.C. (Kenya)
- Police F.C. (Rwanda)
- Police FC (Trinidad and Tobago)
- Police FC (Uganda)
- Police Sports Club (Grenada), Grenada
- PSNI F.C., Police Service of Northern Ireland Football Club
- Heegan FC, Horsed, Somalia
- West Midlands Police F.C., Birmingham, England

== See also ==
- AS Police (disambiguation)
- Kyoto Prefectural Police S.C., Japan
