= Serge Michel Odzoki =

Congolese politician

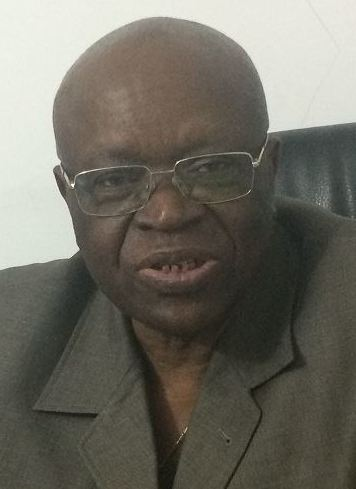
- Born: December 29, 1948 (age 77); Ouesso, Republic of the Congo
- Occupations: Politician, journalist

Serge Michel Odzoki (born 29 December 1948) is a Congolese politician. A member of the Congolese Labour Party (PCT), he is a journalist by profession and worked for years as a diplomat before serving in the government of Congo-Brazzaville as Minister of Sports and Youth from December 2007 to September 2009. He has been a Deputy in the National Assembly since 2009 and Spokesman of the PCT since 2011.

== Biography ==
Odzoki was born in Ouesso. He studied in France and earned a degree in journalism. Back in Congo, he worked as a journalist; he was the press attaché to the Presidency of the Republic from 1979 to 1981, as well as editor in chief at National Congolese Broadcasting and deputy editor at National Congolese Television. He then served as Director of National Congolese Broadcasting from 1984 to 1986. Subsequently, he was Deputy Delegate of the Congolese Embassy to the Agency of Cultural and Technical Cooperation (ACCT) from 1986 to 1993, as well as Deputy Permanent Representative of Congo to UNESCO and cultural and press counsellor at the Congolese Embassy in France. In 1997, he became the interim chargé d'affaires at the Congolese embassy in Germany, holding that post for ten years.

In the June–August 2007 parliamentary election, Odzoki was elected to the National Assembly as the PCT candidate in the first constituency of Ewo. He received 32.67% of the vote in the first round against 22.28% for Yvon Norbert Gambeg of the Club 2002-PUR; in the second round of voting, he defeated Gambeg, receiving 62.65% of the vote. Following the election, he was designated as First Vice-President of the Education, Culture, Science and Technology Commission in the National Assembly on 18 September 2007. He was subsequently appointed to the government as Minister of Sports and Youth on 30 December 2007.

Odzoki was dismissed from the government on 15 September 2009; he was succeeded at the Ministry of Sports by Jacques-Yvon Ndolou on 21 September 2009. He then returned to his seat in the National Assembly. At the PCT's Sixth Extraordinary Congress in July 2011, he was elected to the PCT's 51-member Political Bureau and designated as the PCT's Secretary for Communication and Spokesman.

In the July 2012 parliamentary election, Odzoki was re-elected to the National Assembly as the PCT candidate in the first constituency of Ewo; he won the seat in the first round of voting, receiving 60.43% of the vote. In September 2012, he was again designated as First Vice-President of the National Assembly's Education, Culture, Research, Science, and Technology Commission.

During the campaign for the September 2014 local elections, Odzoki was dispatched to Likouala Department to campaign for the PCT's candidates there.
