= Ajax de Ouenzé =

- Full name: Ajax de Ouenzé
- Ground: Stade Alphonse Massemba-Débat, Brazzaville
- Capacity: 25,000
- Chairman: Riki Nelson
- Manager: Roger Nianga
- League: Congo Premier League
- 2010–11: Championnat National, 4th
Home colours

Ajax de Ouenzé is a Congolese football club based in Ouenzé, Brazzaville, that plays in the Congo Premier League.
