= Club 57 Tourbillon =

- Full name: Club 57 Tourbillon

Club 57 Tourbillon is a Congolese football club based in Brazzaville. They participated in the CAF Confederation Cup in the 2009 season.

== Honours ==
- Congo Premier League: 0

- Coupe du Congo: 1

2008.

- Super Coupe du Congo: 0

== Performance in CAF competitions ==
- CAF Confederation Cup: 1 appearance
  - 2009 – First Round
