= Munisport de Pointe-Noire =

Munisport
- Full name: Munisport de Pointe-Noire
- Ground: Stade Municipal de Pointe-Noire; Pointe-Noire, Republic of the Congo
- Capacity: 13,500
- League: Congo Premier League

Munisport de Pointe-Noire is a Congolese football club based in Republic of the Congo. They play in the Congo Premier League.

== Honours ==
- Congo Premier League: 2

1996, 1997.

- Coupe du Congo: 1

2004.

- Super Coupe du Congo: 0

== Performance in CAF competitions ==
- CAF Confederation Cup: 1 appearance

2005 – Preliminary Round
