= Congolese Air Force =

Air warfare branch of the Republic of the Congo's military

- Force Aérienne Congolaise
- Congolese Air Force roundel
- Founded: 29 July 1959; 66 years ago
- Country: Republic of the Congo
- Type: Air force
- Role: Aerial warfare
- Part of: Congolese Armed Forces

Aircraft flown
- Fighter: Mirage F1
- Helicopter: Mil Mi-35, Mil Mi-17
- Transport: An-32, CN235 Ilyushin Il-76

The Congolese Air Force (French: Force Aérienne Congolaise) is the air branch of the Armed Forces of the Republic of the Congo, in the Republic of the Congo (Congo-Brazzaville).

== Former Cold War air force ==
After achieving independence from France in 1960, the Congolese air force (Force Aerienne Congolaise) was started with equipment such as the Douglas C-47s, Broussards and Bell 47Gs, these were followed by Nord Noratlas tactical transports and Sud Alouette helicopter. In the 1970s the air force switched to Soviet equipment. This included five Ilyushin Il-14 and six turboprop Antonov An-24 transports and an An-26 in return for providing bases for Cuban MiG-17 operations over Angola. These fighters and a few MiG-15UTI combat trainers were transferred to the FAC. In 1990 these fighters were replaced by 16 USSR supplied MiG-21MF/bis Fishbeds plus a couple of MiG-21US trainers. Together with a Soviet training mission which stayed until late 1991, during that time there were numerous accidents that involved both Soviet and Congolese personnel. After the Soviets left there was only limited funding for MiG operations and they were withdrawn. Six Mi-8 helicopters were delivered from Ukraine in mid-1997 before the Cobra rebel takeover.

=== Former personnel and budget ===
A small, but adequate budget and personnel. Financial aid also came from the former USSR and some personnel were either Soviets or Cubans.

=== Political and combat role ===
Its role was as a Communist bastion in central Africa and to counter the politically unstable, pro-Western regime in Zaire (the then former name of the DRC). Its role is now one of countering cross-border smuggling operations, intermittent counterinsurgency actions in the northern provinces and successfully containing the crisis in the DRC along its border. Its first batch of aircraft, the MiG-15s and some of the MiG-17s, arrived in the early 1960s just after the Congo's independence from France and Zaire's independence from Belgium.

It was organised into fighter, counterinsurgency, transport and support wings.

=== Arms suppliers and personnel training ===
France, China and the Soviet Union supplied arms and aircraft. The Soviets and Cubans trained the air force as a whole, but France also trained some of its officers.

== Aircraft ==
=== Current inventory ===
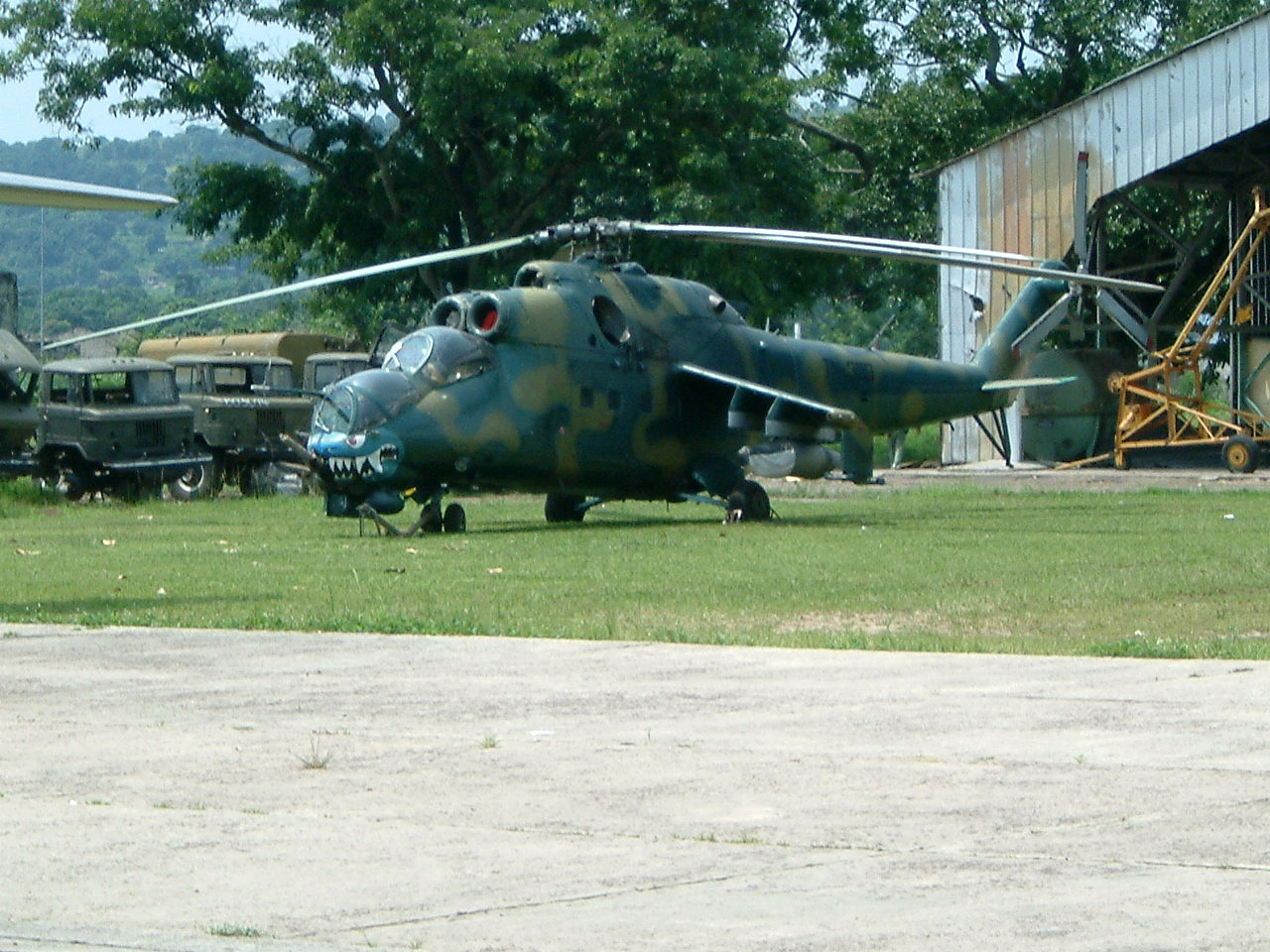
A Congolese Mi-24 in Brazzaville, 2005.

Aircraft	Origin	Type	Variant	In service	Notes
Combat aircraft
Mirage F1	France	Fighter		2	
Transport
Antonov An-32	Ukraine	Transport		2	
CASA CN-235	Spain	Transport / Utility		1	
Ilyushin Il-76	Russia	Transport		1	
Helicopters
Mil Mi-8	Russia	Transport / Utility	Mi-8/17	6	
Mil Mi-24	Russia	Attack	Mi-35	1	

=== Retired aircraft ===
Previous aircraft operated by the Air Force consisted of the MiG-21, MiG-17F, C-47 Dakota, SN.601 Corvette, N.2501F Noratlas, Ilyushin Il-14, Antonov An-24, Antonov An-26, Alouette II, Alouette III, AS365 Dauphin, and the MiG-15UTI.

=== Arms suppliers and personnel training ===
France, China and Ukraine supplied the arms and aircraft. France and China also trained the air force as a whole, but France has also trained most of its air force officers.

== See also ==
- Armed Forces of the Republic of the Congo

== Sources ==
- Dorling Kinnersley World reference atlas for 1994
- Tri-service pocketbook- Soviet and East European Major Combat Aircraft for 1990,
- Tri-service pocketbook- NATO Major Combat Aircraft for 1990,
- A news clipping on the helicopter and transport plane of about the same date.
- Prentice Hall/Salamander Books book- An Illustrated Guide to Aircraft Markings (1989).
- Aircraft information files Bright star publishing File 358 sheet 2
