= Charles Richard Mondjo =

Congolese military officer (born 1954)

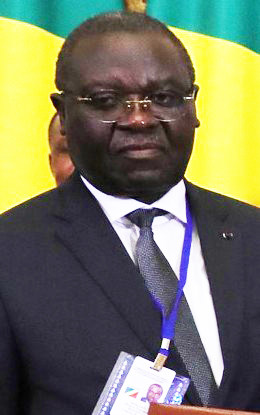
- Mondjo in 2019
- Born: January 28, 1954 (age 72); Brazzaville
- Occupation: Military officer

Charles Richard Mondjo (born 28 January 1954) is a Congolese military officer who has served in the government of Congo as Minister of Defense since 2012. Previously he was Chief of Staff of the Congolese Armed Forces from 2002 to 2012.

== Military career ==
An ethnic Mbochi and the son of diplomat Nicolas Mondjo, Charles Richard Mondjo was born in Brazzaville on 28 January 1954, attending school in Cuvette Department and Brazzaville. Subsequently he attended military preparatory school. He received training at a military school in East Germany from 1976 to 1978 and at a military school in the Soviet Union from 1982 to 1986.

Back in Congo, Mondjo served as an army officer, and he was Director of Lessons and Studies at the Marien Ngouabi Military Academy in Brazzaville from 1987 to 1993. He sided with rebel leader Denis Sassou Nguesso during the June–October 1997 civil war; the war ended with Sassou Nguesso regaining power and ousting President Pascal Lissouba. In December 1997, Mondjo was appointed as Commander of Military Zone 1, which included the country's economic capital, Pointe-Noire; he remained in that post for five years. He was appointed as Chief of Staff of the Congolese Armed Forces on 20 December 2002, and he was promoted to the rank of major-general (général de division).

After serving nearly ten years as Chief of Staff, Mondjo was appointed to the government as Minister at the Presidency for National Defense on 25 September 2012. He was officially succeeded as Chief of Staff by Major-General Guy Blanchard Okoï at a ceremony on 7 November 2012.

Mondjo met with French Defense Minister Jean-Yves Le Drian in Brazzaville on 11 February 2014 for a discussion about instability in the Central African Republic.

After Sassou Nguesso's victory in the March 2016 presidential election, he retained Mondjo in his post as Minister of National Defense on 30 April 2016.
