= Abeilles FC =

- Full name: Abeilles FC
- Ground: Stade Municipal de Pointe-Noire; Pointe-Noire, Republic of the Congo
- Capacity: 13,500

Abeilles FC is a Congolese football club based in Pointe-Noire.

In 1967 the team has won the Congo Premier League.

== Honours ==
- Congo Premier League: 1

1967

== Stadium ==
Currently the team plays at the 13500 capacity Stade Municipal de Pointe-Noire.
