= AS Police (Brazzaville) =

Police
- Full name: AS Police (Brazzaville)
- Ground: Stade Alphonse Massemba-Débat; Brazzaville, Republic of the Congo
- Capacity: 33,037
- League: Congo Premier League
- 2011: 12

AS Police (Brazzaville) is a Congolese football club based in Brazzaville, Republic of the Congo.

The team plays currently plays in Congo Second Division.

In 2002 and 2005, the club has won the Congo Premier League.

== Honours ==
- Congo Premier League: 2

2002, 2005.

- Coupe du Congo: 1

2001.

- Super Coupe du Congo: 0

== Stadium ==
Currently the team plays at the 33300 capacity Stade Alphonse Massemba-Débat.
