= JS Poto-Poto =

- Full name: Jeunesse Sportive de Poto-Poto
- League: Congo Premier League

Jeunesse Sportive de Poto-Poto is a Congolese football club based in the city of Brazzaville in the Republic of the Congo. They currently play in the top domestic Congo Premier League.
