= Super Coupe du Congo (Republic of Congo) =

- Founded: 2000
- Region: (Republic of the Congo) Congo
- Most championships: AC Léopards

The Super Coupe du Congo English: Congo Super Cup, is an association football cup competition held in the Republic of Congo. The competition is held between the Coupe du Congo champions and the Congo Premier League champions of the same season.

== Winners ==
List of winners:

Year	Winner	Result	Runner-up
2019	Étoile du Congo (Brazzaville)	3–0	AS Otôho
