= Coupe du Congo (Republic of Congo) =

- Founded: 1974
- Region: (Republic of the Congo) Congo
- Current champions: CSMD Diables Noirs (2023)
- Most championships: CSMD Diables Noirs (10 titles)
- 2024 Coupe du Congo

The Coupe du Congo is the top knockout tournament of the Congolese football. It was created in 1974.

== Winners ==
List of winners:

Year	Winner	Result	Runner-up
1974	Vita Club Mokanda (Pointe-Noire)		
1975, 1976	unknown		
1977	Vita Club Mokanda (Pointe-Noire)		
1978	Inter Club (Brazzaville)		
1979, 1980	Unknown		
1981	CARA Brazzaville		
1982	AS Chéminots (Pointe-Noire)		
1983	Étoile du Congo (Brazzaville)		
1984	AS Chéminots (Pointe-Noire)		
1985	Inter Club (Brazzaville)		
1986	CARA Brazzaville		
1987	Inter Club (Brazzaville)		
1988	Patronage Sainte-Anne (Brazzaville)		
1989	Diables Noirs (Brazzaville)		
1990	Diables Noirs (Brazzaville)		
1991	Elecsport (Bouansa)	0–0 (3–2 pen)	Diables Noirs (Brazzaville)
1992	CARA Brazzaville	1–0	Étoile du Congo (Brazzaville)
1993	no cup held		
1994	EPB (Pointe-Noire)	1–0 a.e.t.	Inter Club (Brazzaville)
1995	Étoile du Congo (Brazzaville)	1–0 a.e.t.	Inter Club (Brazzaville)
1996	Vita Club Mokanda (Pointe-Noire)		
1997	Vita Club Mokanda (Pointe-Noire)		
1998, 1999	no cup held		
2000	Étoile du Congo (Brazzaville)	5–1	Vita Club Mokanda (Pointe-Noire)
2001	AS Police (Brazzaville)	1–0	Étoile du Congo (Brazzaville)
2002	Étoile du Congo (Brazzaville)	2–1	Abeilles FC (Pointe-Noire)
2003	CSMD Diables Noirs (Brazzaville)	0–0 a.e.t. (3–2 pen)	Vita Club Mokanda (Pointe-Noire)
2004	Muni Sport (Pointe-Noire)	0–0 (3–0 pen)	Vita Club Mokanda (Pointe-Noire)
2005	CSMD Diables Noirs (Brazzaville)	1–1 (4–2 pen)	Patronage Sainte-Anne (Brazzaville)
2006	Étoile du Congo (Brazzaville)	2–1	JS Talangaï (Brazzaville)
2007	JS Talangaï (Brazzaville)	2–1	CARA Brazzaville
2008	Club 57 Tourbillon (Brazzaville)	2–1	FC Kondzo
2009	AC Léopard (Dolisie)	awarded 3–0	CARA Brazzaville
2010	AC Léopard (Dolisie)	(final not played)	Étoile du Congo
2011	AC Léopard (Dolisie)	1–0	CSMD Diables Noirs
2012	CSMD Diables Noirs	1–0	AC Léopard (Dolisie)
2013	AC Léopard (Dolisie)	1–0	CSMD Diables Noirs
2014	CSMD Diables Noirs (Brazzaville)	2–0	CARA Brazzaville
2015	CSMD Diables Noirs (Brazzaville)	1–0	AC Léopard (Dolisie)
2016	AC Léopard (Dolisie)	1–0	CARA Brazzaville
2017	AC Léopard (Dolisie)	2–2 (4–3 pen)	CARA Brazzaville
2018	CSMD Diables Noirs (Brazzaville)	0–0 (5–3 pen)	AS Otohô
2019	Étoile du Congo (Brazzaville)	0–0 (4–2 pen)	AS Otohô
2020–21	Not played		
2022	CSMD Diables Noirs (Brazzaville)	1–0	AS Otohô
2023	CSMD Diables Noirs (Brazzaville)	1–0	AS Otohô
2024		abandoned	
2025		Not played	
2026	CARA Brazzaville	1–1 (3–2 pen)	JS Talangaï (Brazzaville)
