= Vita Club Mokanda =

- Full name: Vita Club Mokanda
- Founded: 1952
- Ground: Stade Municipal de Pointe-Noire; Pointe-Noire, Republic of the Congo
- Capacity: 13,500
- League: Congo Premier League
- 2023–24: 9th
Home colours

Vita Club Mokanda, formerly Victoria Club Mokanda, is a football club based in Pointe-Noire, Republic of the Congo. They play in the Congo Premier League. In 1971 the team has won the Congo Premier League.

== Stadium ==
Currently the team plays at the 13500 capacity Stade Municipal de Pointe-Noire.

== Honours ==
- Congo Premier League: 3

1971, 1998, 1999.

- Coupe du Congo: 4

1974, 1977, 1996, 1997.

== Performance in CAF competitions ==
- CAF Champions League: 1appearance

1971 African Cup of Champions Clubs
