= CS La Mancha =

- Full name: CS La Mancha
- Ground: Stade Municipal de Pointe-Noire; Pointe-Noire, Republic of the Congo
- Capacity: 13,500
- League: Congo Premier League

CS La Mancha is a Congolese football club based in Pointe-Noire, Republic of the Congo. They play in the Congo Premier League.

== Stadium ==
Currently the team's home arena is at the 13,594-seater stadium Stade Municipal de Pointe-Noire.
