= AS Kondzo =

Congolese association football club

- Full name: Association Sportive Kondzo
- Ground: Stade Alphonse Massemba-Débat; Brazzaville, Republic of the Congo
- Capacity: 33,037
- League: Congo Premier League
- 2023–24: 10th place

Association Sportive Kondzo is a Congolese football club based in Brazzaville, Republic of the Congo. They play in the Congo Premier League.

== Performance in CAF competitions ==
- CAF Confederation Cup: 1 appearance

2014 – First Round
