= Tongo FC =

- Full name: Tongo Football Club Jambon
- Nickname: TFC
- Founded: 2010
- Ground: Stade Alphonse Massamba-Débat; Brazzaville, Republic of the Congo
- Capacity: 33,037
- Chairman: Alphonse Tchibinda
- Manager: Édouard Nkoghe
- League: Congo Premier League

Tongo FC Jambon is a Congolese football club based in Brazzaville, Republic of the Congo. They play in the Congo Premier League.
