= Stade Municipal (Pointe-Noire) =

Stadium in Pointe-Noire, Republic of the Congo

Coordinates: 4°46′40″S 11°52′00″E

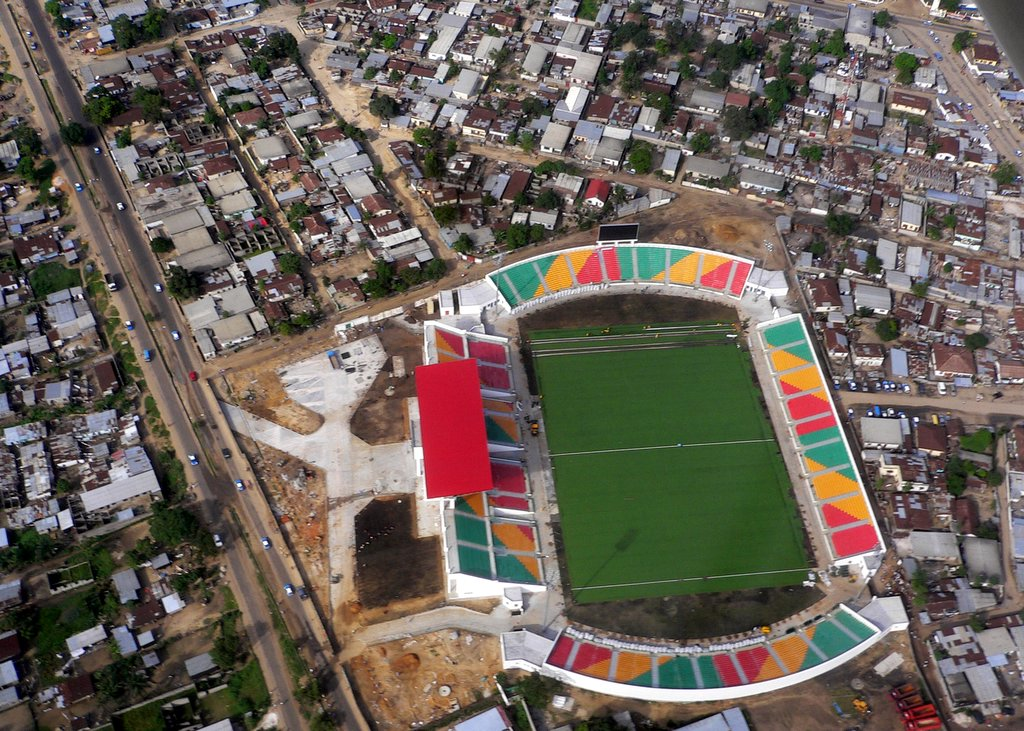
- Interactive map of Stade Municipal
- Former names: Stade Casimir Mvoulalea (1975-2007)
- Location: Pointe-Noire, Republic of the Congo
- Operator: AS Cheminots; JS Bougainvillées
- Capacity: 13,000+
- Surface: artificial turf

Construction
- Opened: 1975 & 17 January 2007
- Renovated: 19 December 2006

Tenants
- AS Cheminots (2006–present); JS Bougainvillées (2006–present)

Stade Municipal is a multi-use stadium in Pointe-Noire, Republic of the Congo. It is used for football matches and serves as the home of Association Sportive des Cheminots and Jeunesse Sportive les Bougainvillées. It holds over 13,000 spectators.
