= Patronage Sainte-Anne =

- Full name: Patronage Sainte-Anne
- Ground: Stade Alphonse Massamba-Débat; Brazzaville, Republic of the Congo
- Capacity: 33,037
- League: Congo Premier League

Patronage Sainte-Anne is a Congolese football club based in Brazzaville, Republic of the Congo. They play in the Congo Premier League.

== Honours ==
- Congo Premier League: 2

1969, 1986.

- Coupe du Congo: 1

1988.

- Super Coupe du Congo: 0
