= Congo Ligue 1 =

Top-level football league in Republic of the Congo

Championnat National MTN
- Founded: 1961; 65 years ago
- Country: Republic of the Congo
- Confederation: CAF
- Number of clubs: 14
- Level on pyramid: 1
- Domestic cup(s): Coupe du Congo; Super Coupe du Congo
- International cup(s): Champions League; Confederation Cup
- Current champions: AC Léopards (2023–24)
- Most championships: Étoile du Congo (11)
- Current: 2026–27 Congo Ligue 1

Congo Ligue 1 is the top division of the Congolese Football Federation, in the Republic of the Congo. It was created in 1961. The official name is Championnat National MTN for sponsorship reasons.

Between 1961 and 1977 the championship was decided in a 3-team tournament between the regional champions of Brazzaville, Pointe-Noire, and Niari. From 1978 to 1993, a nationwide league with 10 to 14 teams was played. From 1994 to 2008, the FECOFOOT reverted to a national play-off after the regional tournaments, with additional entries for the stronger leagues (Brazzaville, Pointe-Noire). In 2009, a nationwide league was reformed with 18 teams.

== Championnat National MTN Clubs – 2016 ==
- AC Léopards (Dolisie)
- AS Cheminots (Pointe-Noire)
- AS Kondzo (Brazzaville)
- AS Ponténégrine (Pointe-Noire)
- CARA Brazzaville (Brazzaville)
- CS La Mancha (Pointe-Noire)
- CSM Diables Noirs (Brazzaville)
- Étoile du Congo (Brazzaville)
- Inter Club (Brazzaville)
- Jeunes Fauves (Dolisie)
- JS Poto-Poto (Brazzaville)
- JS Talangaï (Brazzaville)
- Kimbonguila Kinkala
- Munisport (Pointe-Noire)
- Nico-Nicoyé (Pointe-Noire)
- Patronage Sainte-Anne (Brazzaville)
- Pigeon Vert
- Saint Michel d'Ouenzé (Brazzaville)
- Tongo FC Jambon (Brazzaville)
- V. Club Mokanda (Pointe-Noire)

== Previous winners ==
- 1961: CSM Diables Noirs (Brazzaville) bt AS Cheminots (Pointe-Noire)
- 1962–66: no championship
- 1967: Étoile du Congo (Brazzaville)
- 1968: Patronage Sainte-Anne (Brazzaville)
- 1969: CARA Brazzaville (Brazzaville)
- 1970–71: Victoria Club Mokanda (Pointe-Noire)
- 1972: not held
- 1973: CARA Brazzaville (Brazzaville)
- 1974: not held
- 1975: CARA Brazzaville (Brazzaville)
- 1976: CSM Diables Noirs (Brazzaville) bt Vita Club Mokanda (Pointe-Noire)
- 1977–78: Étoile du Congo (Brazzaville)
- 1979: Étoile du Congo (Brazzaville)
- 1980: Étoile du Congo (Brazzaville)
- 1981–82: CARA Brazzaville (Brazzaville)
- 1982–83: Kotoko MFOA (Brazzaville)
- 1983: Étoile du Congo (Brazzaville)
- 1984: CARA Brazzaville (Brazzaville)
- 1985: Étoile du Congo (Brazzaville)
- 1986: Patronage Sainte-Anne (Brazzaville)
- 1987: Étoile du Congo (Brazzaville)
- 1988: Inter Club (Brazzaville)
- 1989: Étoile du Congo (Brazzaville)
- 1990: Inter Club (Brazzaville)
- 1991: CSM Diables Noirs (Brazzaville)
- 1992–93: not held
- 1994: championship abandoned
- 1995: AS Cheminots (Pointe-Noire) 1–0 Patronage Sainte-Anne (Brazzaville)
- 1996: Munisport (Pointe-Noire)
- 1997: Munisport (Pointe-Noire) bt Union Sport (Brazzaville)
- 1998: Vita Club Mokanda (Pointe-Noire) 1–0 Étoile du Congo (Brazzaville)
- 1999: not held
- 2000: Étoile du Congo (Brazzaville)
- 2001: Étoile du Congo (Brazzaville) 1–0 CS La Mancha (Pointe-Noire)
- 2002: AS Police (Brazzaville) 2–1 Étoile du Congo (Brazzaville)
- 2003: Saint Michel d'Ouenzé (Brazzaville) 0–0 CS La Mancha (Pointe-Noire) (4–3 on pens)
- 2004: CSM Diables Noirs (Brazzaville) 2–1 AS Police (Brazzaville)
- 2005: AS Police (Brazzaville)
- 2006: Étoile du Congo (Brazzaville) 1–0 CS La Mancha (Pointe-Noire)
- 2007: CSM Diables Noirs (Brazzaville) 2–0 AS Ponténégrine (Pointe-Noire)
- 2008: CARA Brazzaville (Brazzaville) 2–1 FC Bilombé (Pointe-Noire)
- 2009: CSM Diables Noirs (Brazzaville)
- 2010: Saint Michel d'Ouenzé (Brazzaville) 3–2 AC Léopards (Dolisie)
- 2011: CSM Diables Noirs (Brazzaville) 2–0 AC Léopards (Dolisie)
- 2012: AC Léopards (Dolisie) 1–1 CSM Diables Noirs (Brazzaville) (aet; 4–2 on pens)
- 2013: AC Léopards (Dolisie)
- 2014: abandoned due to financial problems
- 2015: abandoned due to club boycotts
- 2016: AC Léopards (Dolisie)
- 2017: AC Léopards (Dolisie)
- 2018: AS Otohô (Oyo)
- 2018–19: AS Otohô (Oyo)
- 2019–20: AS Otohô (Oyo)
- 2021: AS Otohô (Oyo)
- 2021–22: AS Otohô (Oyo)
- 2022–23: AS Otohô (Oyo)
- 2023–24: AC Léopards (Dolisie)

== Performance by clubs ==
Club	Winners
Étoile du Congo	11
CSM Diables Noirs	7
CARA Brazzaville	6
AS Otôho	6
AC Léopards	5
Inter Club	2
Munisport	2
Patronage Sainte-Anne	2
AS Police	2
Saint Michel d'Ouenzé	2
Vita Club Mokanda (includes Victoria Club Mokanda)	2
AS Cheminots	1
Kotoko MFOA	1

== Qualification for CAF competitions ==
=== Association ranking for the 2025–26 CAF club season ===
The association ranking for the 2025–26 CAF Champions League and the 2025–26 CAF Confederation Cup will be based on results from each CAF club competition from 2020–21 to the 2024–25 season.

Legend

- CL: CAF Champions League
- CC: CAF Confederation Cup
- ≥: Associations points might increase on basis of its clubs performance in 2024–25 CAF club competitions
- Associations ranked 1–12 are eligible to enter two teams in each CAF club competition.

Rank			Association	2020–21 (× 1)		2021–22 (× 2)		2022–23 (× 3)		2023–24 (× 4)		2024–25 (× 5)		Total
2025	2024	Mvt	Association	CL	CC	CL	CC	CL	CC	CL	CC	CL	CC	Total
1	1	—	Egypt	8	3	7	4	8	2.5	7	7	10	4	190.5
2	2	—	Morocco	4	6	9	5	8	2	2	4	5	5	142
3	4	+1	South Africa	8	2	5	4	4	3	4	1.5	9	3	131
4	3	-1	Algeria	6	5	7	1	6	5	2	3	5	5	130
5	6	+1	Tanzania	3	0.5	0	2	3	4	6	0	2	4	82.5
6	5	-1	Tunisia	4	3	5	1	4	2	6	1	3	0.5	82.5
7	8	+1	Angola	1	0	5	0	2	0	3	1.5	2	2	55
8	7	-1	DR Congo	4	0	0	3	1	2	4	0	2	0	45
9	9	—	Sudan	3	0	3	0	3	0	2	0	3	0	41
10	11	+1	Ivory Coast	0	0	0	1	0	3	3	0	1	2	38
11	10	-1	Libya	0	0.5	0	5	0	0.5	0	3	0	0	24
12	12	—	Nigeria	0	2	0	0	0	2	0	2	0	1	21
13	15	+2	Mali	0	0	0	0	0	1	0	2	1	0.5	18.5
14	14	—	Ghana	0	0	0	0	0	0	1	3	0	0	16
15	13	-2	Guinea	2	0	1	0	2	0	0	0.5	0	0	12
16	19	+3	Botswana	0	0	1	0	0	0	1	0	0	0.5	8.5
17	21	+4	Senegal	1	2	0	0	0	0	0	0	0	1	8
18	17	-1	Mauritania	0	0	0	0	0	0	2	0	0	0	8
19	18	-1	Congo	0	0	0	1	0	1	0	0.5	0	0	7
20	16	-4	Cameroon	0	3	0	0.5	1	0	0	0	0	0	7
21	22	+1	Togo	0	0	0	0	0	1	0	0	0	0	3
22	22	—	Uganda	0	0	0	0	1	0	0	0	0	0	3
23	-	new	Mozambique	0	0	0	0	0	0	0	0	0	0.5	2.5
24	20	-4	Zambia	0	1.5	0	0.5	0	0	0	0	0	0	2.5
25	24	-1	Eswatini	0	0	0	0.5	0	0	0	0	0	0	1
25	24	-1	Niger	0	0	0	0.5	0	0	0	0	0	0	1
27	26	-1	Burkina Faso	0	0.5	0	0	0	0	0	0	0	0	0.5

== Top goalscorers ==
Season	Best scorers	Team	Goals
2002	Lepaye Wawa	Police	18
2004	Bébé Ndey Guellor	Étoile du Congo	19
2007	(Republic of the Congo) Ulrich Lépaye	Diables Noirs	5
2008	(Cameroon) Alfred Mfoungang	Diables Noirs	7
2009	(Republic of the Congo) Éric Niemba	Diables Noirs	22
2023-24	(Republic of the Congo) Lendambi Bonaventure	JUK	14
