= JS Talangaï =

Talangaï
- Full name: Jeunesse Sportive de Talangaï
- Ground: Stade Alphonse Massemba-Débat; Brazzaville
- Capacity: 33,037
- League: Congo Premier League
- 2023–24: 4th

Jeunesse Sportive de Talangaï is a Congolese football club based in Brazzaville.

The club currently plays in Congo Premier League.

In 2007 the team has won the Coupe du Congo.

== Honours ==
- Coupe du Congo
  - Winners (1): 2007

== Performance in CAF competitions ==
- CAF Confederation Cup: 1 appearance

2007 – Preliminary Round
2008 – Preliminary Round

== Stadium ==
Currently the team plays at the 50000 capacity Stade Alphonse Massemba-Débat.
