= AS Cheminots =

- Full name: Association Sportive des Cheminots
- Ground: Stade Municipal; Pointe-Noire, Congo
- Capacity: 13,594
- League: Congo Premier League
- 2023–24: 8th

Association Sportive des Cheminots or simply AS Cheminots is a Congolese football club based in Pointe-Noire, Republic of the Congo. They play in the Congo Premier League.

== Honours ==
- Congo Premier League: 1

1995.

- Coupe du Congo: 2

1982, 1984.

- Super Coupe du Congo: 0
