= AS Otohô =

Congolese football club

- Full name: Association Sportive Otohô
- Ground: Complexe Omnisports d’Oyo, Oyo
- Capacity: 1,629
- Chairman: Raymond Mwamba
- Manager: Christophe Mulumba
- League: Congo Premier League
- 2023–24: Congo Premier League, 2nd

Association Sportive Otohô is a Congolese football club based in the city of Oyo in central Congo.

== Honours ==
- Congo Premier League
  - Champions (6): 2018, 2018–19, 2019–20, 2021, 2021–22, 2023–24
  - Runners-up (1): 2017
- Coupe du Congo
  - Runners-up (1): 2018

== Performance in CAF competitions ==
- CAF Champions League: 5 appearances

2018 – Preliminary Round
2019 – First Round
2020 – Preliminary Round
2021 – Preliminary Round
2022 – Second Round

- CAF Confederation Cup: 3 appearances

2018–19 – Group Stage
2021–22 – Group Stage
2025–26 – Quarter Finals
