= Inter Club Brazzaville =

AS Inter Club
- Full name: Association Sportive Inter Club Brazzaville
- Founded: 1967
- Ground: Stade Alphonse Massemba-Débat; Brazzaville
- Capacity: 33,037
- League: Congo Premier League
- 2023–2024: 3rd
Home colours

Association Sportive Inter Club Brazzaville or simply Inter Club Brazzaville is a Congolese sports club (basketball, football and volleyball) based in Brazzaville. Orlando Magic basketball player, Serge Ibaka played for the team as a sixteen-year-old.

== Basketball ==
=== Notable players ===
- Set a club record or won an individual award as a professional player.
- Played at least one official international match for his senior national team or one NBA game at any time.

Note: Flags indicate national team eligibility at FIBA-sanctioned events. Players may hold other non-FIBA nationalities not displayed.

- (Republic of the Congo) Bertrand Boukinda
- (Republic of the Congo) Japhie Nguia
- (Central African Republic) Max Kouguere
- (Spain) Serge Ibaka

== Football ==
=== Honours ===
- Congo Premier League: 2

1988, 1990.

- Coupe du Congo: 3

1978, 1985, 1987.

- Super Coupe du Congo: 0
