= Saint Michel d'Ouenzé =

Saint-Michel de Ouenzé
- Full name: Saint-Michel de Ouenzé
- Ground: Stade Alphonse Massemba-Débat, Brazzaville, Republic of Congo
- Capacity: 33,037
- League: Congo Premier League
- 2014: Congo Premier League, 14th
Home colours

Saint-Michel de Ouenzé is a Congolese football club based in Brazzaville.

== Honours ==
- Congo Premier League: 2

2003, 2010

== Performance in CAF competitions ==
- CAF Champions League: 2 appearances

2004: First Round
2011: Preliminary Round
