= CSMD Diables Noirs =

Association football club

CSM Diables Noirs
- Full name: Club Sportif Multidisciplinaire Diables Noirs
- Nickname: Yaka dia Mama
- Founded: 1950; 76 years ago
- Ground: Stade Alphonse Massemba-Débat; Brazzaville, Republic of Congo
- Capacity: 33,037
- League: Congo Premier League
- 2023–24: 6th
Home colours	Away colours

Club Sportif Multidisciplinaire Diables Noirs or simply CSMD Diables Noirs is a Congolese football club based in Brazzaville.

The club won its seventh domestic league title in 2009.

== History ==
The Diables Noirs started as an all-star club drawn from clubs through Bacongo. The town of Brazzaville was divided into two sides, Poto-Pota and Bacongo, and no Bacongo team had beaten the top team from Poto-Poto to win the town championship in over 6 years. The teams were part of the Fédération Athlétique Congolaise (FAC), a group of clubs run by the Catholic mission.

=== Controversy ===
The mission kept all proceeds from the team and provided little support to the players. The leaders of teams from Bacongo, who played under the shared sponsorship of Association Sportive de la Mission, told the missionaries they wanted to create their own team of the best players to challenge for the city championship. They chose the name "Black Devils" after the champions from Belgium, the "Red Devils". The mission, not in favor of the new team or the new name, refused to recognize the team. The youth in the mission decided to boycott mass, and intimidated others from attending. To quell potential upheaval, colonial authorities agreed to the creation of the team and even allowed a percentage of the funds they generated.

=== Style of play ===
A Frenchman named Aimé Brun offered to help the team in the role of trainer and adviser. They adopted a short passing game and tighter marking on defense, instead of the traditional British style relying on crosses. With this style, they were finally able to win the city championship against Poto-Poto and go undefeated each year from 1952 to 1954.

=== Crest ===
old crest

== Honours ==
- Brazzaville City Championships: 3
  - 1952, 1953, 1954
- Congo Premier League: 7
  - 1961, 1977, 1992, 2004, 2007, 2009, 2011
- Coupe du Congo: 10
  - 1989, 1990, 2003, 2005, 2012, 2014, 2015, 2018, 2022, 2023

== Performance in CAF competitions ==
- CAF Champions League: 4 appearances

2005 – preliminary round
2008 – preliminary round
2010 – preliminary round
2012 – preliminary round
2014 – preliminary round
2015 – preliminary round

- African Cup of Champions Clubs: 3 appearances

1966: Quarter-Finals
1977: second round
1992: First Round

- CAF Confederation Cup: 3 appearances

2004 – preliminary round
2006 – first round
2013 – second round

- CAF Cup Winners' Cup: 2 appearances

1990 – second round
1991 – second round
