= Stade Alphonse Massemba-Débat =

Stadium in Brazzaville, Republic of the Congo

Coordinates: 4°16′24.7″S 15°14′54.3″E

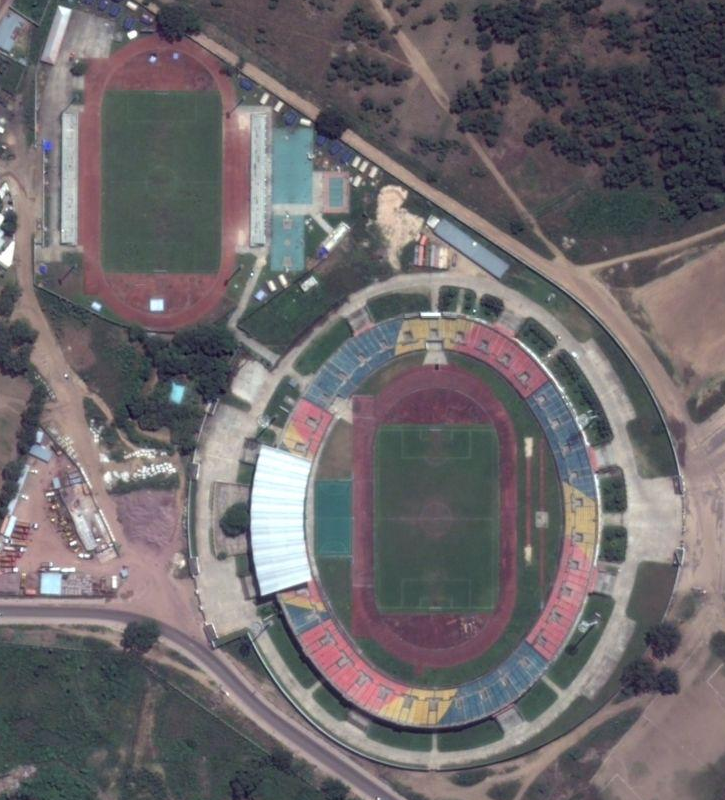
- Interactive map of Stade Alphonse Massemba-Débat
- Full name: Stade Alphonse Massemba-Débat
- Former names: Stade de la Revolution
- Location: Brazzaville, Republic of the Congo
- Capacity: 33,037
- Surface: GrassMaster

Tenants
- Congo national football team CARA Brazzaville; Étoile du Congo

The Alphonse Massemba-Débat Stadium (formally named Stade de la Revolution) in Brazzaville is one of the two national stadiums of the Congo national football team, along with the Stade Municipal de Kintélé. It is used for football matches and also has an athletics track and a handball court. It hosts the home games of CARA Brazzaville and Étoile du Congo. It holds 33,037 people. It was the venue for the 1965 All-Africa Games and the 2004 African Championships in Athletics.

| Preceded by First venue | All-Africa Games; Venue; 1965 | Succeeded by Surulere Stadium; Lagos |
| Preceded by Stade 7 November; Tunis | African Championships in Athletics; Venue; 2004 | Succeeded by Stade Germain Comarmond; Bambous |
