= Étoile du Congo =

Association football club in Congo

- Full name: Étoile du Congo
- Founded: 1926; 100 years ago
- Ground: Stade Alphonse Massemba-Débat; Brazzaville, Congo
- Capacity: 33,037
- Chairman: Réné Blanchard Oba
- Manager: Benoît Kokolo
- League: Congo Ligue 1
- 2023–24: Congo Ligue 1, 5th of 14

Étoile du Congo is a Congolese professional football club based in Brazzaville.

== History ==
L'Étoile du Congo started as a team in the Fédération Athlétique Congolaise (FAC), a league run by Catholic missionaries in the Belgian Congo. The church provided clothes and shoes and the team was required to attend mass. The team, known at the time as Renaissance, won the Brazzaville city championship each year from 1945 to 1950 led by team-captain Dominique Sombo. They played at Eboué stadium, which was owned by the mission.

=== Controversy ===
The players, being colonized, were not compensate at all for their efforts. The mission would collect money at the gates, and did not pay for medical treatment or transport to games. In 1951, the players decided to write to the Director of Social Services to request to leave the mission and to be sponsored by a cultural center. After threatening to boycott colonial administrators assuaged their demands to avoid popular outcry. Renaissance won another city championship and independence from the FAC. To celebrate their new autonomy, the team changed their name to L'Étoile, in respect to a star Brazzaville team from the 1930s. The name Renaissance was given to reserve team of younger players.

== Honours ==
- Congo Premier League: 11

1967, 1978, 1979, 1980, 1983, 1985, 1987, 1989, 2000, 2001, 2006.

- Coupe du Congo: 6

1983, 1995, 2000, 2002, 2006, 2019.

- Super Coupe du Congo: 1

2019.

== Performance in CAF competitions ==
- CAF Champions League: 3 appearances

2001 – second round
2002 – second round
2007 – second round

- African Cup of Champions Clubs: 8 appearances

1968 – first round
1979 – second round
1980 – quarter-finals

1982 – first round
1988 – first round
1990 – second round

1993 – first round
1995 – first round

- CAF Confederation Cup: 2 appearances

2007 – second round of 16
2015 – preliminary round

- CAF Cup: 1 appearance

1992 – second round

- CAF Cup Winners' Cup: 3 appearances

1996 – first round
2000 – quarter-finals
2003 – second round

== Current squad ==
As of 14 July 2021

Note: Flags indicate national team as defined under FIFA eligibility rules; some limited exceptions apply. Players may hold more than one non-FIFA nationality.

No.	Pos.	Nation	Player
25	GK	CGO	Pavelh Ndzila
—	GK	CGO	Chancel Massa

No.	Pos.	Nation	Player
—	FW	CGO	Saïra Issambet
