= CARA Brazzaville =

Congolese football club

- Full name: Club Athlétique Renaissance Aiglons Brazzaville
- Founded: 1935
- Ground: Stade Alphonse Massemba-Débat; Brazzaville, Republic of the Congo
- Capacity: 33,037
- Chairman: François Kinsumba
- Manager: Jocelyn Mvoungou
- League: Congo Premier League
- 2023–24: 7th
- Website: https://www.caracongo.com/
Home colours

Club Athlétique Renaissance Aiglon Brazzaville, known simply as CARA Brazzaville, is a Congolese football club based in Brazzaville, Republic of the Congo, playing games out of the Stade Alphonse Massemba-Débat. The club won the 1974 African Cup of Champions Clubs, the most prestigious continental club football tournament at the time, the only major continental championship won by any Congolese club until the victory of AC Léopards in the 2012 CAF Confederation Cup.

== Crest ==
old crest

old crest

== Honours ==
=== National ===
- Congo Premier League
  - Winners (6): 1969, 1973, 1975, 1981, 1984, 2008.
- Coupe du Congo
  - Winners (4): 1981, 1986, 1992, 2026.

=== International ===
- African Cup of Champions Clubs
  - Winners (1): 1974

== Performance in CAF competitions ==
- CAF Champions League: 1 appearance

2009 – Preliminary Round

- African Cup of Champions Clubs: 7 appearances

1970: Second Round
1973: Second Round
1974: Champion
1975: Quarter-Finals
1976: Second Round
1983: Second Round
1985: Second Round

- CAF Confederation Cup: 2 appearances

2014 – First Round
2015 – Preliminary Round
2018 – Quarter-Finals

- CAF Cup Winners' Cup: 2 appearances

1982 – withdrew in First Round
1993 – First Round

== Notable former managers ==
- (Romania) Cicerone Manolache (1972–74)
